= December 1992 Serbian local elections =

Cities and municipalities across Serbia held local elections on 20 December 1992, with a second round of voting taking place on 3 January 1993. The local elections took place concurrently with parliamentary elections in Yugoslavia, presidential and parliamentary elections in Serbia, and elections for the Vojvodina provincial assembly.

The elections were held under a two-round system of voting in single-member constituencies.

The Socialist Party of Serbia (SPS) won the elections in most jurisdictions, including the capital Belgrade. The Democratic Fellowship of Vojvodina Hungarians (VMDK) was successful in Serbia's predominantly Hungarian communities.

This was the second local election cycle to take place while Serbia was a member of the Federal Republic of Yugoslavia, and it occurred against the backdrop of ongoing wars in Croatia and Bosnia and Herzegovina.

== Results ==
=== Belgrade ===
Elections were held at the city level and in all of Belgrade's constituent municipalities. The Socialist Party of Serbia won a reduced majority victory in the city assembly and also won majority victories in most municipalities. In Palilula, Rakovica, and Zemun, the Socialists governed in an alliance with the Serbian Radical Party (SRS).

The opposition Democratic Movement of Serbia (DEPOS) won majority victories in Stari Grad, Voždovac, and Vračar. In Zvezdara, the DEPOS alliance initially formed a coalition government with the Democratic Party. In both Voždovac and Zvezdara, divisions in the opposition ultimately led to the fall of their administrations.

In both Savski Venac and Voždovac, the Socialists and the Serbian Renewal Movement (SPO; the main party in the DEPOS alliance) ultimately formed coalition administrations.

==== City of Belgrade ====
Results of the election for the City Assembly of Belgrade:

Party	Seats
Socialist Party of Serbia (SPS)	68
Democratic Movement of Serbia (DEPOS)	21
Serbian Radical Party (SRS)	12
Democratic Party (DS)	8
Citizens' Group candidates (GG)	1
Total	110

Note: Only parties or alliances that won representation in the assembly are listed.

Results for the City Assembly of Belgrade by municipality:

Results for the City Assembly of Belgrade by municipality
Municipality	SPS	DEPOS	SRS	DS	GG
Barajevo	2	-	-	-	-
Čukarica	9	1	-	-	-
Grocka	4	-	-	-	-
Lazarevac	4	-	-	-	-
Mladenovac	4	-	-	-	-
New Belgrade	13	1	-	-	-
Obrenovac	5	-	-	-	-
Palilula	6	-	3	2	-
Rakovica	4	-	3	-	-
Savski Venac	-	2	-	1	-
Sopot	1	-	-	-	1
Stari Grad	-	3	-	2	-
Voždovac	5	7	-	-	-
Vračar	-	3	-	2	-
Zemun	7	-	5	-	-
Zvezdara	4	4	1	1	-
Total	68	21	12	8	1

Incumbent mayor Slobodanka Gruden was confirmed for another term in office after the election, while Nebojša Čović served as president of the executive committee. Čović succeeded Gruden as mayor on 23 June 1994. One week later, Zoran Milošević was designated to become the new executive committee president; Milošević formally took office on 12 July. All were members of the Socialist Party of Serbia.

==== Municipalities of Belgrade ====
===== Barajevo =====
Results of the election for the Municipal Assembly of Barajevo:

Party	Seats
Socialist Party of Serbia	24
Democratic Movement of Serbia	6
Citizens' Group candidates	2
Serbian Radical Party	1
Total	33

Only parties or alliances that won representation in the assembly are listed. When the assembly convened on 22 January 1993, Slavko Gajić of the Socialist Party of Serbia was chosen as mayor.

===== Čukarica =====
Results of the election for the Municipal Assembly of Čukarica:

Party	Seats
Socialist Party of Serbia	34
Democratic Movement of Serbia	9
Serbian Radical Party	7
Democratic Party	3
Total	53

Only parties or alliances that won representation in the assembly are listed. Incumbent mayor Vladimir Matić and incumbent deputy mayor Dragoljub Spasenović, both of the Socialist Party of Serbia, were confirmed for new terms in their respective offices when the assembly met in January 1993.

In December 1995, Nikola Tomašević was chosen as president of the executive council.

===== Grocka =====
Results of the election for the Municipal Assembly of Grocka:

Party	Seats
Socialist Party of Serbia	27
Democratic Movement of Serbia	6
Citizens Group candidates	2
Democratic Party	2
Serbian Radical Party	1
Total	38

Only parties or alliances that won representation in the assembly are listed. Bogoljub Stevanić of the Socialist Party of Serbia was chosen as mayor after the election. He was replaced by fellow party member Milan Janković in 1995. Slobodan Žižić served as deputy mayor.

===== Lazarevac =====
Results of the election for the Municipal Assembly of Lazarevac:

Party	Seats
Socialist Party of Serbia	39
Democratic Movement of Serbia	11
Citizens Group candidates	7
Social Democratic Party	3
Total	60

Only parties or alliances that won representation in the assembly are listed. Incumbent mayor Slavoljub Nikolić was confirmed for another term in office when the assembly convened in January 1993, while Milivoje Jokić was chosen as deputy mayor. Both were members of the Socialist Party of Serbia.

Nikolić resigned as mayor effective 1 July 1996.

===== Mladenovac =====
Results of the election for the Municipal Assembly of Mladenovac:

Party	Seats
Socialist Party of Serbia	42
Democratic Movement of Serbia	12
Citizens' Group candidates	1
Total	55

Only parties or alliances that won representation in the assembly are listed. Radmilo Gajić of the Socialist Party of Serbia was chosen as mayor after the election. Gajić resigned in November 1994 amid a building permits scandal and was replaced by Tihomir Tomićević, also of the Socialists. Miroljub Paunović served as president of the executive council.

===== New Belgrade =====
Results of the election for the Municipal Assembly of New Belgrade:

Party	Seats
Socialist Party of Serbia	34
Democratic Party	9
Democratic Movement of Serbia	8
Serbian Radical Party	3
Citizens' Group candidates	1
Total	55

Only parties or alliances that won representation in the assembly are listed. Incumbent New Belgrade mayor Čedomir Ždrnja was confirmed for a new term in office after the election, and Miloš Milošević was chosen as deputy mayor. Both were members of the Socialist Party of Serbia. The Democratic Party received one seat on the municipality's executive board.

===== Obrenovac =====
Results of the election for the Municipal Assembly of Obrenovac:

Party	Seats
Socialist Party of Serbia	34
Democratic Movement of Serbia	14
Serbian Radical Party	3
Citizens' Group candidates	2
Citizens' Group–Socialist Party of Serbia	2
Democratic Party	–
League of Communists – Movement for Yugoslavia	–
People's Radical Party	–
Serbian National Renewal	–
Serbian Opposition–People's Party	–
Total	55

When the assembly convened on 29 January 1993, Slobodan Jovičić was chosen as mayor and Budimir Davidović as deputy mayor. Both were members of the Socialist Party of Serbia. Davidović became mayor in 1996.

===== Palilula =====
Results of the election for the Municipal Assembly of Palilula:

Party	Seats
Socialist Party of Serbia	24
Democratic Movement of Serbia and Democratic Party (combined total)	19
Serbian Radical Party	10
Citizens' Group candidates and Peasants Party of Serbia (combined total)	2
Total	55

Only parties or alliances that won representation in the assembly are listed. When the assembly convened on 2 February 1993, incumbent Palilula mayor Vladimir Rajić of the Socialist Party of Serbia was confirmed for another term in office. Žarko Lazarević of the Socialists and Predrag Stojić of the Serbian Radical Party were chosen as deputy mayors.

===== Rakovica =====
Results of the election for the Municipal Assembly of Rakovica:

Party	Seats
Socialist Party of Serbia	26
Serbian Radical Party	16
Democratic Movement of Serbia	5
Democratic Party	3
Total	50

Only parties or alliances that won representation in the assembly are listed. When the assembly convened on 25 January 1993, incumbent mayor Slavica Tanasković of the Socialist Party of Serbia was confirmed for another term in office. The Radicals supported the local government.

===== Savski Venac =====
Results of the election for the Municipal Assembly of Savski Venac:

Party	Seats
Democratic Movement of Serbia	16
Socialist Party of Serbia	12
Democratic Party	8
Citizens' Group: Deposovci	1
Total	37

Only parties or alliances that won representation in the assembly are listed. Somewhat surprisingly, a group of representatives elected for the Democratic Movement of Serbia (DEPOS) formed an administration with the Socialist Party of Serbia (SPS) after the election. Nikola Adašević of the Serbian Renewal Movement (SPO), one of the parties in the DEPOS coalition, was chosen as mayor. Goran Blagojević of the SPS was elected as deputy mayor over Čedomir Višnjić of the Democratic Party of Serbia (DSS), another party in the DEPOS coalition; the DSS subsequently announced it would not support the government.

By virtue of serving as mayor, Adašević also initially served as president of the assembly's executive board. In May 1994, these offices were separated, and Branislav Ćirić of the Serbian Renewal Movement became executive board president.

===== Sopot =====
Results of the election for the Municipal Assembly of Sopot:

Party	Seats
Socialist Party of Serbia	21
Citizens' Group candidates	5
Democratic Movement of Serbia	5
Democratic Party	2
Total	33

Only parties or alliances that won representation in the assembly are listed. Incumbent mayor Živorad Milosavljević of the Socialist Party of Serbia was confirmed for another term in office after the election.

===== Stari Grad =====
Results of the election for the Municipal Assembly of Stari Grad:

Party	Seats
Democratic Movement of Serbia	38
Democratic Party	16
Citizens' Group candidates	1
Socialist Party of Serbia	1
Total	56

When the assembly convened in January 1993, Jovan Kažić of the Serbian Renewal Movement was chosen as mayor. There were no other candidates for the position, and he received forty-eight votes, with six spoiled ballots. By virtue of serving as mayor, Kažić was also president of the executive board. Miodrag Milovanović of the Democratic Party of Serbia became deputy mayor, receiving thirty-six votes as against eighteen for Democratic Party candidate Dušan Kuzmanović. Both the Serbian Renewal Movement and the Democratic Party of Serbia were members of the Democratic Movement of Serbia alliance.

===== Voždovac =====
Results of the election for the Municipal Assembly of Voždovac:

Party	Seats
Democratic Movement of Serbia	31
Socialist Party of Serbia	22
Democratic Party	2
Total	55

Božidar Simatković was chosen as mayor after the election, and Gordana Matijašević was chosen as deputy mayor. Both were members of the Democratic Movement of Serbia (DEPOS) alliance; Matijašević was specifically a member of the Democratic Party of Serbia. In September 1994, six representatives elected for DEPOS formed a new alliance with the Socialists in the municipal assembly, and Simatković and Matijašević were controversially removed from office. Zoran Modrinić of the Socialist Party of Serbia (SPS) was chosen as mayor, while Ljubica Koruski of the Socialists and Radmila Živkov of the Serbian Renewal Movement (SPO) became deputy mayors.

Modrinić later left the Socialist Party and joined the Yugoslav Left. He continued to serve as mayor.

===== Vračar =====
Results of the election for the Municipal Assembly of Vračar:

Party	Seats
Democratic Movement of Serbia	38
Democratic Party	21
Citizens' Group candidates	1
Total	60

When the assembly convened on 25 January 1993, Dragan Maršićanin of the Democratic Party of Serbia, one of the parties in the Democratic Movement of Serbia coalition, was chosen as mayor. Slavko Tatić of the Democratic Party was chosen as deputy mayor.

===== Zemun =====
Results of the election for the Municipal Assembly of Zemun:

Party	Seats
Socialist Party of Serbia	28
Serbian Radical Party	18
Democratic Movement of Serbia	6
Democratic Party–Serb Democratic Party–Social Democratic Party	2
Citizens' Group candidates	1
Total	55

Incumbent mayor Nenad Ribar of the Socialist Party of Serbia was confirmed for a new term in office in January 1993. Olga Radović of the Socialists and Ilija Gavrilović of the Serbian Radical Party served as deputy mayors, and Mile Ćurguz served as president of the executive board for at least part of the term.

===== Zvezdara =====
Results of the election for the Municipal Assembly of Zvezdara:

Party	Seats
Democratic Movement of Serbia	25
Socialist Party of Serbia	19
Democratic Party	6
Serbian Radical Party	3
Total	53

On 15 February 1993, Budimir Ivanović of the Serbian Renewal Movement (one of the parties in the Democratic Movement of Serbia coalition) was chosen as mayor, and Miroslav Janković of the Democratic Party was chosen as deputy mayor. The Democratic Party left the government in November 1994, and Janković's term as deputy mayor came to an end. On 3 July 1995, Ivanović was dismissed as mayor through a motion of the Socialists.

=== Vojvodina ===
==== Central Banat District ====
===== Zrenjanin =====
Results of the election for the Municipal Assembly of Zrenjanin:

Party	Seats
Socialist Party of Serbia	46
Democratic Coalition (DEKO)	15
Serbian Radical Party	8
Citizens' Group candidates	1
Total	70

Only parties or alliances that won representation in the assembly are listed. When the assembly convened on 15 January 1993, incumbent mayor Ljubo Slijepčević was confirmed for another term in office, defeating Bojan Grujin by a vote of fifty-two to thirteen. Incumbent deputy mayor Ivanka Stanimirov defeated Ernő Svan by a vote of fifty-one to thirteen, and incumbent chair of the executive committee Novica Pavlović defeated Zoltán Gyarmati, fifty-two to thirteen. All incumbents were members of the Socialist Party, and all defeated candidates were from the Democratic Coalition.

Stanimirov stood down as deputy mayor on 19 September 1995, having been appointed to an assistant ministerial position in the Yugoslavian government, and was replaced by Žarko Stanižan, also of the Socialist Party.

===== Nova Crnja =====
Results of the election for the Municipal Assembly of Nova Crnja:

Party	Seats
Socialist Party of Serbia	12
United Opposition (Serbian Renewal Movement, Democratic Party, Democratic Fellowship of Vojvodina Hungarians in Toba)	10
Citizens' Group candidates	3
Democratic Fellowship of Vojvodina Hungarians	1
Total	26

Only parties or alliances that won representation in the assembly are listed.

After the election, the United Opposition joined forces with the Citizens' Group candidates and the independently elected member of the Democratic Fellowship of Vojvodina Hungarians to form a majority in the assembly. When the assembly convened on 19 January 1993, Ferenc Stefik of the Democratic Party was chosen as mayor, defeating Ilija Vidić of the Socialists, fourteen votes to twelve. Radovan Milankov of the Serbian Renewal Movement was chosen as deputy mayor, defeating Duško Daničić of the Socialists by the same margin.

===== Novi Bečej =====
Results of the election for the Municipal Assembly of Novi Bečej:

Party	Seats
United Opposition	18
Socialist Party of Serbia	8
Citizens' Group candidates	4
Serbian Radical Party	1
Total	31

Only parties or alliances that won representation in the assembly are listed. The eighteen United Opposition delegates included four members of the Democratic Fellowship of Vojvodina Hungarians (VMDK), as well as members of the Democratic Movement of Serbia (DEPOS), the People's Peasant Party (NSS), the People's Party (NS), and independents.

When the municipal assembly convened in late January 1993, Dragan Belić was chosen as mayor, and Ferenc Erdman became deputy mayor. Both were members of the United Opposition, and Erdman was a member of the VMDK.

===== Žitište =====
Results of the election for the Municipal Assembly of Žitište:

Party	Seats
Socialist Party of Serbia	16
Democratic Coalition (Democratic Movement of Serbia, Democratic Fellowship of Vojvodina Hungarians, Democratic Party, League of Social Democrats of Vojvodina)	8
Citizens' Group candidates	7
League of Communists – Movement for Yugoslavia	–
Serbian Radical Party	–
Total	31

When the assembly convened on 18 January 1993, incumbent mayor Predrag Amižić and incumbent deputy mayor Kosta Milivojević were confirmed for new terms in their respective offices. Both were members of the Socialist Party of Serbia. By virtue of serving as mayor, Amižić was also president of the assembly's executive committee.

==== North Bačka District ====
Elections took place in all three municipalities of the North Bačka District. The Democratic Fellowship of Vojvodina Hungarians (VMDK) won majority victories in Subotica and Bačka Topola, while an alliance of the VMDK, Democratic Movement of Serbia, and the Reform Democratic Party of Vojvodina won a majoirty victory in Mali Iđoš.

The VMDK split in 1994, and several prominent members left to form the breakaway Alliance of Vojvodina Hungarians (VMSZ). In Subotica and Mali Iđoš, most leading members of the VMDK joined the new party, and there was little disruption within the local administrations. The situation in Bačka Topola was different: the VMDK initially formed a new administration without the VMSZ, but in December 1994 a coalition including the VMSZ came to power, and the VMDK was left in opposition.

The Socialist Party joined the municipal administrations of Bačka Topola and Mali Iđoš in 1994.

===== Subotica =====
Results of the election for the Municipal Assembly of Subotica:

Party	Seats
Democratic Fellowship of Vojvodina Hungarians	34
Democratic Alliance of Croats in Vojvodina	10
Socialist Party of Serbia	9
Coalition for Subotica (Democratic Movement of Serbia, Democratic Party, Reform Democratic Party of Vojvodina, Civic Movement for Subotica – Doves of Subotica, League of Social Democrats of Vojvodina)	3
Serbian Radical Party	3
Bunjevac-Šokac Party–Party of Yugoslavs	3
Citizens' Group candidates	3
Independent Peasant Party	1
Coalition for Subotica–Citizens' Group	1
Total	67

Only parties or alliances that won representation in the assembly are listed. When the assembly convened on 12 January 1993, incumbent mayor József Kasza of the Democratic Fellowship of Vojvodina Hungarians was confirmed for another term in office with the support of fifty out of the sixty delegates who were present. Incumbent deputy mayor Stanka Kujundžić of the Democratic Alliance of Croats in Vojvodina was also confirmed for another term in office, as was incumbent chair of the executive committee Imre Kern, who was elected as an independent (Citizens' Group) candidate. Ilija Šujica, an ethnic Serb who was elected with a dual endorsement from the Coalition for Subotica and a citizens' group, was also appointed as a deputy mayor in May 1994 in a bid to ensure Serb representation in the administration.

The Democratic Fellowship of Vojvodina Hungarians experienced a serious split in 1994, and Kasza and Kern joined the breakaway Alliance of Vojvodina Hungarians, which became an official party the following year. Both continued to serve in their respective offices.

===== Bačka Topola =====
Results of the election for the Municipal Assembly of Bačka Topola:

Party	Seats
Democratic Fellowship of Vojvodina Hungarians	32
Socialist Party of Serbia	14
Citizens' Group candidates	3
Democratic Movement of Serbia	1
Total	50

Only parties or alliances that won representation in the assembly are listed.

When the new assembly convened on 20 January 1993, incumbent mayor János Kószó was confirmed for a new term in office, and Zoltán Turuc was chosen as chair of the assembly's executive committee. Both were members of the Democratic Fellowship of Vojvodina Hungarians (VMDK). Stevan Rankov, the delegate elected from the Democratic Movement of Serbia (DEPOS), was chosen as deputy mayor on 29 January 1993.

The VMDK split in 1994, and both Kószó and Turuc affiliated with the breakaway Alliance of Vojvodina Hungarians (VMSZ). Most VMDK delegates in the assembly remained with the party, however, and in June 1994 Kószó and Turuc were removed from office and replaced with János Agyánszki and Laszló Januskó, respectively. The Socialists also participated in the new government.

The VMDK-led administration fell on 28 December 1994, and a new administration came to power that was supported by the VMSZ, the Socialists, Stevan Rankov, and the independent delegates. Zoltán Turuc was chosen as mayor, and Milan Savić of the Socialists was chosen as chair of the executive committee; both received the support of twenty-seven delegates. The VMDK was excluded from the new administration.

===== Mali Iđoš =====
Results of the election for the Municipal Assembly of Mali Iđoš:

Party	Seats
Democratic Movement of Serbia–Reform Democratic Party of Vojvodina–Democratic Fellowship of Vojvodina Hungarians	16
Socialist Party of Serbia	9
Total	25

Only parties or alliances that won representation in the assembly are listed.

When the new assembly met on 19 January 1993, the Socialist Party of Serbia representatives proposed László Horváth, local leader of the Democratic Fellowship of Vojvodina Hungarians (VMDK), for mayor. He declined the nomination. Incumbent mayor Károly Pál of the Reform Democratic Party of Vojvodina was then confirmed for a new term in office, with thirteen delegates supporting his candidacy and twelve opposed. Ljiljana Petrić was reappointed as president of the executive council, receiving the support of twelve delegates, with one spoiled ballot and two votes against. Horváth was chosen as a member of the executive council on 8 February 1993. In 1994, Milan Stevović of the Socialist Party succeeded Petrić as executive council president.

The VMDK experienced a serious split in 1994, with several members joining the breakaway Alliance of Vojvodina Hungarians (VMSZ). László Horváth joined the new party, as did Károly Pál. Both remained in their respective municipal offices.

==== North Banat District ====
===== Kikinda =====
Results of the election for the Municipal Assembly of Kikinda:

Party	Seats
Socialist Party of Serbia	40
Kikinda Democratic Alliance	5
Serbian Radical Party	5
Citizens' Group candidates	1
Total	51

Only parties or alliances that won representation in the assembly are listed. When the assembly convened on 18 January 1993, Rajko Popović of the Socialist Party was the only nominee for mayor. The election took place via an open ballot; the opposition delegates boycotted the vote on the grounds that potential dissidents within the Socialist majority were not permitted to freely express their choice. Unsurprisingly, Popović was elected to the role.

Popović was dismissed from office on 30 July 1996, having lost the support of several delegates in his own party. Živodarka Dacin of the Socialists was chosen as his successor, and Rade Marčeta was chosen as deputy mayor.

Rajko Matović of the Socialist Party was identified as president of the assembly's executive council in a March 1996 news report. It is unclear if he continued to serve in this office after Dacin succeeded Popović as mayor.

===== Ada =====
Results of the election for the Municipal Assembly of Ada:

Party	Seats
Democratic Fellowship of Vojvodina Hungarians	19
Citizens' Group candidates	3
Serbian Radical Party	1
Serbian Renewal Movement	1
Socialist Party of Serbia	1
Total	25

Only parties or alliances that won representation in the assembly are listed.

Rudolf Surányi was chosen as mayor when the assembly convened on 21 January 1993, while incumbent deputy mayor Ferenc Gruber and incumbent executive council president János Bozsóki were confirmed for new terms in their respective offices. All were members of the Democratic Fellowship of Vojvodina Hungarians (VMDK).

The VMDK experienced a serious split in 1994, with several members ultimately leaving to form the Alliance of Vojvodina Hungarians (VMSZ). Surányi, Gruber, and Bozsóki all joined the new party, which replaced the VMDK as the dominant Hungarian party in the municipality.

===== Čoka =====
Results of the election for the Municipal Assembly of Čoka:

Party	Seats
Democratic Fellowship of Vojvodina Hungarians	14
Citizens' Group candidates	9
Socialist Party of Serbia	6
Democratic Movement of Serbia	1
Serbian Radical Party	1
Total	31
Source: There are small discrepancies between these sources as to the number of delegates elected per party designation.

Only parties or alliances that won representation in the assembly are listed. The seat totals do not provide a full picture of the assembly's composition: in practice, the Democratic Fellowship of Vojvodina Hungarians (VMDK) had the support of fifteen delegates, as did an alliance comprising the Socialist Party, the Radical Party, and most Citizens' Group delegates. Andrija Poljak of the Democratic Movement of Serbia (DEPOS) was the "swing vote," not formally aligned with either camp.

Tensions were high when the municipal assembly met on 26 January 1993. Ferenc Lakatos, as the oldest delegate, presided over the assembly on a provisional basis. The first two attempts to elect to a mayor ended in failure: both the Socialist Party nominee Mirko Stojkov (who served as mayor in the previous term) and the VMDK nominee Miklós Ribár received fifteen votes. After a break in the proceedings, the VMDK made an agreement with the DEPOS delegate. When the session resumed, György Berkovits was elected as mayor and József Fehér as deputy mayor, both by votes of sixteen to fifteen.

On 12 February 1993, the assembly held an emergency meeting and annulled the results of the 26 January vote; Poljak was persuaded to change his vote following pressure from the Socialist Party's bloc. There were tensions between Serb and Hungarian representatives at this meeting, although some delegates from both communities made efforts to calm the situation. The assembly did not elect a new mayor, and Stojkov, as the outgoing mayor from the previous term, returned to the position on a provisional basis.

Further attempts to resolve the standoff were not successful, and on 22 May 1993 the Serbian government appointed a five-member council, chaired by Stojkov, to govern the municipality.

===== Kanjiža =====
Results of the election for the Municipal Assembly of Kanjiža:

Party	Seats
Democratic Fellowship of Vojvodina Hungarians	28
Citizens' Group candidates	3
Reform Democratic Party of Vojvodina	1
Socialist Party of Serbia	1
Total	33

Only parties or alliances that won representation in the assembly are listed. One of the independent candidates elected to the assembly was actually a member of the Socialist Party of Serbia (SPS), and another was a member of the Serbian Radical Party (SRS).

When the assembly convened on 21 January 1993, István Bacskulin was elected as mayor, while Lajos Forró was chosen as deputy mayor and chair of the executive committee. Both were members of the Democratic Fellowship of Vojvodina Hungarians (VMDK).

On 25 February 1994, Forró was replaced by Imre Majorosi, also of the VMDK. The new executive committee approved on the same day included Vladimir Šupić of the Socialists.

The VMDK experienced a serious split in 1994, and several leading members left to form the Alliance of Vojvodina Hungarians (VMSZ). Bacskulin became a member of the new party, while Majorosi appears to have remained with the VMDK. This does not appear to have significantly affected the operations of the local government.

Imre Majorosi requested to be removed as executive committee president on 19 March 1996, citing poor health. He was replaced by Mgr. János Dobos of the VMSZ.

===== Novi Kneževac =====
Incumbent Novi Kneževac mayor Dušan Jančić of the Socialist Party of Serbia was confirmed for another term in office after the election.

===== Senta =====
Results of the election for the Municipal Assembly of Senta:

Party	Seats
Democratic Fellowship of Vojvodina Hungarians	26
Citizens' Group candidates	2
Socialist Party of Serbia	1
Total	29

Only parties or alliances that won representation in the assembly are listed.

When the assembly convened on 20 January 1993, incumbent mayor Gábor Tóth Horti and incumbent executive committee chair Ferenc Szűcs were chosen for new terms in their respective offices. János Zámborszki was chosen as deputy mayor. All were members of the Democratic Fellowship of Vojvodina Hungarians.

The VMDK experienced a serious split in 1994, and several leading members left to form the Alliance of Vojvodina Hungarians (VMSZ). Tóth Horti became a prominent member of the new party. Zámborszki, whose term as deputy mayor seems to have ended before 1995, remained with the VMDK. Szűcs, who served his full term in office, left the VMDK but does not seem to have formally aligned himself with the VMSZ.

==== South Bačka District ====
===== Novi Sad =====
Results of the election for the Municipal Assembly of Novi Sad:

Party	Seats
Coalition: Democratic Movement of Serbia–Democratic Party–Reform Democratic Party of Vojvodina	24
Serbian Radical Party	22
Socialist Party of Serbia	20
Citizens' Group candidates	2
Democratic Fellowship of Vojvodina Hungarians	1
Socialist Party of Serbia–Citizens' Group: Novi Sad Ecological Movement	1
Total	70

Only parties or alliances that won representation in the assembly are listed. The Democratic Movement of Serbia, the Democratic Party, and the Reform Democratic Party of Vojvodina each won eight seats.

The Serbian Radical Party and the Socialist Party of Serbia formed a coalition government after the election. When the assembly convened on 13 January 1993, Ferenc Papp, the oldest delegate and also the sole elected member of the Democratic Fellowship of Vojvodina Hungarians, presided over the assembly on a provisional basis. Milorad Mirčić of the Serbian Radical Party was elected as mayor, defeating opposition candidate Đorđe Bašić by a vote of forty-five to twenty-four. Igor Mirović of the Radicals and Milorad Đurđević and Dragan Nedeljković of the Socialists were elected as deputy mayors, and Obrad Milošević of the Socialists was chosen over Mihajlo Svilar of the Democratic Movement of Serbia to become chair of Novi Sad's executive committee.

In June 1994, a group of SPS delegates brought forward a motion to remove Mirčić as mayor. With the support of the opposition parties, the motion succeeded. In retaliation, the SRS brought forward a motion to remove Obrad Milošević as chair of the executive committee; Milošević resigned before the vote could take place. Due to the divided nature of the assembly, both positions initially remained vacant. There was an attempt to elect a new mayor in September 1994, but neither of the two candidates received enough votes. Milorad Đurđević of the Socialist Party was Novi Sad's acting mayor during this period.

The Socialists ultimately made an informal alliance with the Reform Democratic Party in January 1995 and, despite having less than one-third of the seats in the assembly, established a new local government in which they held almost all of the most important positions. Đuro Bajić of the SPS was chosen as Novi Sad's mayor on 26 January 1995, defeating Democratic Party candidate Predrag Filipov by thirty-seven votes to twenty-seven, with one invalid ballot. Jovo Ilić, a Citizens' Group delegate, was chosen as a deputy mayor with the support of thirty-six delegates. Zoran Stanković of the Reform Democratic Party also ran for a deputy mayor position but, with only thirty-five votes, fell one vote short of the required amount. (All candidates for city government positions required the support of thirty-six delegates, or fifty per cent plus one of the full assembly, to be elected.) Luka Zorić was chair of the executive committee at this time.

===== Bačka Palanka =====
Incumbent mayor Ljubomir Novaković of the Socialist Party of Serbia was confirmed for a new term in office after the election.

===== Bački Petrovac =====
Results of the election for the Municipal Assembly of Bački Petrovac:

Party	Seats
Democratic Party–Reform Democratic Party of Vojvodina	14
Socialist Party of Serbia	6
All other parties and Citizens' Group candidates	11
Total	31

Incumbent mayor Juraj Červenak of the Reform Democratic Party of Vojvodina was confirmed for another term in office after the election.

===== Bečej =====
Results of the election for the Municipal Assembly of Bečej:

Party	Seats
Democratic Fellowship of Vojvodina Hungarians	23
Socialist Party of Serbia	7
Citizens' Group: Citizens' Alliance for the Municipality of Bečej	4
Citizens' Group candidates (other)	1
Serbian Radical Party	1
Total	36

Only parties or alliances that won representation in the assembly are listed. Endre Huszágh of the Democratic Fellowship of Vojvodina Hungarians (VMDK) was chosen as mayor when the assembly convened on 18 January 1993. The VMDK split in 1994, and Huszágh was one of a number of prominent members who left to join the Alliance of Vojvodina Hungarians (VMSZ).

===== Beočin =====
Veselin Mojić of the Socialist Party of Serbia served as mayor after the election.

===== Srbobran =====
Results of the election for the Municipal Assembly of Srbobran:

Party	Seats
Socialist Party of Serbia	13
Democratic Fellowship of Vojvodina Hungarians	8
Citizens' Group candidates	4
Democratic Movement of Serbia	2
Serbian Radical Party	1
Total	28

Only parties or alliances that won representation in the assembly are listed. Radivoje Prekić of the Socialist Party of Serbia was chosen as mayor after the election.

===== Sremski Karlovci =====
Lazar Crnojački served as mayor after the election, while Miladin Kalinić of the Socialist Party of Serbia served as chair of the executive committee. By 1995, Kalinić had become mayor.

===== Temerin =====
Results of the election for the Municipal Assembly of Temerin:

Party	Seats
Democratic Fellowship of Vojvodina Hungarians	13
Socialist Party of Serbia	9
Serbian Radical Party	7
Democratic Movement of Serbia	1
Citizens' Group candidates	1
Total	31

Only parties or alliances that won representation in the assembly are listed.

The Socialist Party of Serbia and the Serbian Radical Party formed a coalition government after the election. When the assembly convened on 22 January 1993, outgoing mayor Stevan Vještica of the Socialist Party opened the meeting, and Bogoljub Zec of the Radical Party, as the oldest delegate, presided over the session on an interim basis. Branko Rujević of the Socialists was chosen as mayor, while Socialist delegate Milan Kešelj and Radical delegate Spasoje Đukić were chosen as deputy mayors.

Rujević died unexpectedly on 29 April 1994. On 1 June 1994, fellow Socialist delegate Zoran Svitić was chosen as his successor.

===== Titel =====
Svetozar Ikonov served as mayor after the election.

===== Vrbas =====
Results of the election for the Municipal Assembly of Vrbas:

Party	Seats
Socialist Party of Serbia	27
Serbian Radical Party	3
Citizens' Group candidates	2
Democratic Movement of Serbia	2
Democratic Party–Reform Democratic Party of Vojvodina	1
Total	35

Only parties or alliances that won representation in the assembly are listed. When the assembly convened on 29 January 1993, incumbent mayor Srđan Stokuća of the Socialist Party was confirmed for a new term in office with the support of thirty-two delegates. Zoran Koprivica, who was not a party member, was elected as deputy mayor with the support of twenty-eight delegates. The Radical Party nominated Dušan Bukvić for deputy mayor, but their proposal was voted down.

===== Žabalj =====
Dušan Pajić was chosen as mayor of Žabalj after the election.

==== South Banat District ====
===== Pančevo =====
Results of the election for the Municipal Assembly of Pančevo:

Party	Seats
Socialist Party of Serbia	28
Democratic Movement of Serbia	9
Serbian Radical Party	7
Democratic Party	2
Democratic Fellowship of Vojvodina Hungarians	1
Democratic People's Party	1
Green Party	1
People's Party	1
United Opposition (party affiliation unspecified)	1
deferred	1
Total	52

In late January 1993, the leader of the Socialist Party's local branch announced that the Socialist Party representatives in the local assembly would support Bogoljub Bjelica to serve as mayor, Stojmen Veličkovski as deputy mayor, and Nada Kirbus as president of the assembly's executive committee. All were, of course, members of the Socialists. Bjelica was indeed chosen as mayor shortly thereafter, defeating opposition candidate Srđan Miković in a vote of the assembly. Veličkovski and Kirbus were presumably confirmed their respective offices as well.

Bjelica was appointed as a minister in the Serbia government in February 1993 and resigned as mayor the following month. On 19 March 1993, Radivoje Grandov was chosen as the city's new mayor, and Miroslav Pavlović was chosen as deputy mayor. Nada Kirbus remained as president of the executive board. Once again, all were members of the Socialist Party.

The local Socialist organization was extremely divided in this period, and on 14 September 1993 Kirbus was removed from office by hardline elements in her own party. Grandov submitted his resignation as mayor on the same day due to being the subject of a criminal complaint, leaving Pavlović as acting mayor pending the appointment of new municipal leadership.

Danilo Petrović was subsequently chosen as the new president of the executive board. On 25 November 1993, Radenko Topalović was chosen as the city's new mayor. Both, of course, were members of the Socialists.

===== Bela Crkva =====
Results of the election for the Municipal Assembly of Bela Crkva:

Party	Seats
Socialist Party of Serbia	23
All other parties and Citizens' Group candidates	10
Total	33

===== Kovin =====
Janča Trandafir served as mayor of Kovin after the election.

==== Srem District ====
===== Inđija =====
Results of the election for the Municipal Assembly of Inđija:

Party	Seats
Socialist Party of Serbia	17
Serbian Radical Party	8
Citizens' Group candidates	5
Democratic Party of Serbia	3
Democratic Movement of Serbia	3
Total	36

Only parties or alliances that won representation in the assembly are listed. Although the Radicals only won eight seats, they unexpectedly formed government in the municipality with the support of smaller parties, independent members, and one renegade member of the Socialists. Dragan Dimić of the Radicals served as mayor, and Milenko Rakić served as president of the executive board. In October 1994, the Serbian government dissolved the local authority and appointed a provisional administration led by Ljubiša Stojadinović.

===== Irig =====
Results of the election for the Municipal Assembly of Irig:

Party	Seats
Socialist Party of Serbia	13
Serbian Radical Party	9
Citizens' Group candidates	2
Democratic Movement of Serbia	1
Total	25

Only parties or alliances that won representation in the assembly are listed.

===== Pećinci =====
Results of the election for the Municipal Assembly of Pećinci:

Party	Seats
Socialist Party of Serbia	22
United Democratic Opposition	6
Citizens' Group candidates	1
Democratic Party	1
Total	30

Only parties or alliances that won representation in the assembly are listed.

===== Ruma =====
Results of the election for the Municipal Assembly of Ruma:

Party	Seats
Socialist Party of Serbia	26
Serbian Radical Party	7
United Opposition of Ruma	4
Total	37

Only parties or alliances that won representation in the assembly are listed.

===== Stara Pazova =====
The election in Stara Pazova produced a close result, with the Socialist Party of Serbia winning two seats more than the Serbian Radical Party. The Socialists and Radicals could not subsequently agree on a coalition government, and independent representative Dobrivoje Stevelić was chosen as mayor with the support of the Socialists. He submitted his resignation in July 1993, citing constant attacks from the Radicals and their allies. Further attempts at resolving the impasse were unsuccessful. On 8 December 1993, the Serbian government appointed a provisional administration. Nikola Klašnjić served as its president and Srećko Bajić of the Socialists as its vice-president.

==== West Bačka District ====
===== Sombor =====
Results of the election for the Municipal Assembly of Sombor:

Party	Seats
Socialist Party of Serbia	32
Democratic Opposition (Democratic Party, Reform Democratic Party of Vojvodina, Democratic Movement of Serbia, Democratic Alliance of Croats in Vojvodina)	15
Democratic Fellowship of Vojvodina Hungarians	3
Serbian Radical Party	3
Citizens' Group candidates	1
Serb Democratic Party	1
Total	55

Only parties or alliances that won representation in the assembly are listed. When the assembly convened on 28 January 1993, Vasa Relić was chosen as mayor, Dušan Ilić as deputy mayor, and Blagoje Svrkota as president of the executive committee. All were members of the Socialist Party. Miloš Božićković was proposed by the opposition for deputy mayor and was defeated. The independent (Citizens' Group) delegate was János Dubac, who sided with the opposition.

===== Apatin =====
Results of the election for the Municipal Assembly of Apatin:

Party	Seats
Socialist Party of Serbia	24
Citizens' Group candidates	14
Serbian Radical Party	4
Democratic Fellowship of Vojvodina Hungarians	1
Total	43

Only parties or alliances that won representation in the assembly are listed. When the assembly convened on 26 January 1993, Nikola Tatalović was chosen as president and Nebojša Vejin as vice-president, and Miloš Savarac was confirmed for another term as president of the executive council. All were members of the Socialist Party.

===== Kula =====
Results of the election for the Municipal Assembly of Kula:

Party	Seats
Socialist Party of Serbia	35
Reform Democratic Party of Vojvodina–People's Peasant Party– League of Social Democrats of Vojvodina	5
Democratic Movement of Serbia	2
Serbian Radical Party	2
Democratic Fellowship of Vojvodina Hungarians	1
Total	45

Only parties or alliances that won representation in the assembly are listed.

The new municipal assembly convened on 22 January 1993. Incumbent mayor Miladin Stojanović and incumbent deputy mayor Božidar Jovanović, both of the Socialist Party of Serbia, were confirmed for new terms in their respective offices. Goran Kljajić, also of the Socialist Party, was chosen as president of the executive board.

===== Odžaci =====
Results of the election for the Municipal Assembly of Odžaci:

Party	Seats
Socialist Party of Serbia	18
Serbian Radical Party	7
Democratic Fellowship of Vojvodina Hungarians	2
Citizens' Group candidates	1
Total	28

Only parties or alliances that won representation in the assembly are listed. When the assembly convened in late January 1993, the Socialists nominated Draga Pešić Zlatanović for mayor, and the Radicals nominated Savo Sunajko; Pešić Zlatanović was ultimately elected to the position with the support of sixteen delegates. Đokica Mihajlović was elected as deputy mayor with the support of nineteen delegates, and Đorđe Ćirić became chair of the executive committee.

=== Central Serbia (excluding Belgrade) ===
==== Braničevo District ====
===== Malo Crniće =====
When the Malo Crniće municipal assembly convened on 18 January 1993, Tomislav Milovanović was chosen as mayor, Miodrag Marković Draganče as deputy mayor, and Dragoslav Ivić as president of the executive board.

===== Žabari =====
Incumbent Žabari mayor Dušan Pajić was confirmed for another term in office after the election.

==== Jablanica District ====
===== Leskovac =====
Results of the election for the Municipal Assembly of Leskovac:

Party	Seats
Socialist Party of Serbia	61
Serbian Radical Party	5
Serb Democratic Party	1
Citizens' Group candidates	1
information missing	1
Total	69

Only parties or alliances that won representation in the assembly are listed. Gojko Veličković of the Socialist Party of Serbia was chosen as mayor after the election, while Dragiša Bogdanović served as deputy mayor.

===== Bojnik =====
The Socialist Party of Serbia won the elections in Bojnik.

===== Crna Trava =====
Incumbent Crna Trava mayor Časlav Nikolić was confirmed for another term in office after the election. Nikolić was a former official of the League of Communists of Serbia and was presumably a member of the Socialist Party of Serbia by this time.

===== Lebane =====
The Socialist Party of Serbia won the elections in Lebane.

===== Medveđa =====
The elections in Medveđa did not produce a clear winner. Independent (Citizens' Group) representatives formed the largest bloc in the local assembly with nine seats, while the Socialist Party of Serbia had six seats and the Democratic Party of Albanians had five. Citizens' Group representative Miroslav Anđelić served as mayor for a time. Due to the instability of the local administration, the Serbian government ultimately dissolved the assembly and appointed a provisional government.

===== Vlasotince =====
The Socialist Party of Serbia won the elections in Vlasotince, and Vojislav Ljubenović of the Socialists was subsequently chosen as mayor.

==== Kolubara District ====
===== Valjevo =====
Results of the election for the Municipal Assembly of Valjevo:

Party	Seats
Socialist Party of Serbia	35
All other parties and Citizens' Group candidates	15
Total	50

Following the elections, incumbent Valjevo mayor Milorad Ilić and incumbent deputy mayor Veroljub Lazarević were both confirmed for new terms in their respective offices, and Stanko Terzić was named as president of the executive board. All were members of the Socialist Party of Serbia.

===== Ljig =====
Miroslav Kuburović of the Socialist Party of Serbia served as mayor of Ljig after the election.

===== Mionica =====
Results of the election for the Municipal Assembly of Mionica:

Party	Seats
United Opposition	29
Socialist Party of Serbia	16
Total	45

Momir Ranković of the Serbian Renewal Movement served as mayor after the election. Živko Đurić of the People's Radical Party served as president of the executive committee. In early 1995, the Serbian government dissolved the local government and appointed a provisional administration in its place.

==== Mačva District ====
===== Šabac =====
Results of the election for the Municipal Assembly of Šabac:

Party	Seats
Socialist Party of Serbia	53
Democratic Movement of Serbia	5
Citizens' Group candidates	4
Serbian Radical Party	4
Peasants' Party	1
information missing	2
Total	69

Marko Maksimović of the Socialist Party of Serbia served as mayor after the election.

==== Moravica District ====
===== Čačak =====
Results of the election for the Municipal Assembly of Čačak:

Party	Seats
Socialist Party of Serbia	43
Democratic Movement of Serbia	10
Serbian Radical Party	6
Citizens' Group candidates	4
Democratic Party	2
People's Radical Party	1
other seats	–
Total	–
Source: These results may not account for all available seats.

Incumbent mayor Rodoljub Petrović of the Socialists was confirmed for another term in office after the election.

===== Gornji Milanovac =====
The Socialist Party of Serbia won the elections in Gornji Milanovac. Incumbent mayor Dražimir Marušić was subsequently confirmed for another term in office.

==== Nišava District ====
===== Niš =====
Results of the election for the City Assembly of Niš:

Party	Seats
Socialist Party of Serbia	55
Citizens' Group candidates	6
Democratic Movement of Serbia	4
Serbian Radical Party	2
Serbian Opposition	1
information missing	2
Total	70
Source: These results were unofficial. Another source indicates the Socialists ultimately won fifty-six seats.

Incumbent mayor Stojan Ranđelović of the Socialist Party of Serbia was confirmed for another term in office after the election.

===== Doljevac =====
The Socialist Party of Serbia won the local elections in Doljevac, and Aleksandar Cvetković was chosen as mayor.

===== Gadžin Han =====
The Socialist Party of Serbia won the local elections in Gadžin Han, and incumbent mayor Siniša Stamenković was confirmed for another term in office.

===== Svrljig =====
Slavoljub Radosavljević of the Socialist Party of Serbia became mayor of Svrljig after the elections, while Zvezdan Gavrilović became deputy mayor and Branislav Mihajlović became president of the executive board.

==== Pčinja District ====
===== Vranje =====
Results of the election for the Municipal Assembly of Vranje:

Party	Seats
Socialist Party of Serbia	44
Citizens' Group candidates	5
Total	49

Only parties or alliances that won representation in the assembly are listed. When the assembly convened on 29 January 1993, incumbent mayor Dragan Tomić was confirmed for another term in office, Časlav Ristić was chosen as deputy mayor, and Stojadin Stanković became president of the executive board. All were members of the Socialist Party. Tomić stood down as mayor in 1994 after being appointed as head of the Pčinja District and was succeeded by Ristić.

===== Bosilegrad =====
Incumbent Bosilegrad mayor Sotir Sotirov of the Socialist Party of Serbia was confirmed for another term in office after the election. Vasil Jovanov served as president of the executive committee.

===== Bujanovac =====
Tomislav Mitić of the Socialist Party of Serbia served as mayor of Bujanovac after the election, while Zoran Jovanović served as president of the executive committee.

===== Preševo =====
Results of the election for the Municipal Assembly of Preševo:

Party	Seats
Party for Democratic Action	20
Democratic Party of Albanians	11
Citizens' Group candidates	3
Serbian Renewal Movement	1
Total	35

The Socialist Party of Serbia did not contest the election in this municipality.

Riza Halimi served as mayor, while Naser Neziri served as president of the executive committee. Both were members of the Party for Democratic Action.

===== Surdulica =====
When the Surdulica municipal assembly convened on 6 January 1993, incumbent mayor Miroslav Stojiljković of the Socialist Party of Serbia was confirmed for another term in office. Božidar Tomić presided over the assembly on an interim basis. By virtue of serving as mayor, Stojiljković was also president of the assembly's executive committee.

===== Trgovište =====
Boža Krstić became mayor of Trgovište after the election, while Dušan Kolić became president of the executive board. Krstić stood down as mayor in February 1993 and was replaced by Radovan Stojanović.

===== Vladičin Han =====
Dragan Marković served as mayor of Vladičin Han after the election.

==== Pirot District ====
===== Pirot =====
Results of the election for the Municipal Assembly of Pirot:

Party	Seats
Socialist Party of Serbia	31
Democratic Party	6
Citizens' Group candidates	4
Serbian Radical Party	3
Democratic Movement of Serbia	2
other seats	–
Total	–
Source: These results are incomplete; the outcome in some seats was not known at the time of publication.

Tomislav Veljiković of the Socialist Party served as mayor after the election.

==== Podunavlje District ====
===== Smederevo =====
Results of the election for the Municipal Assembly of Smederevo:

Party	Seats
Socialist Party of Serbia	57
Democratic Movement of Serbia	10
Democratic Party	1
Serbian Radical Party	1
Citizens' Group candidates	1
Total	70

Only parties or alliances that won representation in the assembly are listed. Živoslav Adamović of the Socialist Party of Serbia served as mayor after the election, while Milorad Nikolić served as deputy mayor.

===== Smederevska Palanka =====
Toplica Miladinović served as mayor of Smederevska Palanka after the election.

==== Pomoravlje District ====
===== Svilajnac =====
Results of the election for the Municipal Assembly of Svilajnac:

Party	Seats
Socialist Party of Serbia	23
Democratic Movement of Serbia	13
Citizens' Group candidates	3
Total	39

Incumbent mayor Dobrivoje Budimirović of the Socialists was chosen for another term in office after the election.

==== Rasina District ====
===== Kruševac =====
The Socialist Party of Serbia won a majority victory in Kruševac, taking no fewer than forty-one of the fifty-six seats that were decided in the second round of voting. The Democratic Party, Democratic Movement of Serbia, and Citizens' Group candidates each won no fewer than three seats, and the Serbian Radical Party won at least one seat. The assembly had seventy seats in total.

Dragan Jovanović of the Socialist Party was chosen as mayor after the election.

==== Raška District ====
===== Kraljevo =====
Miroslav Karapandžić served as mayor of Kraljevo following the election, and Branko Simović was chosen at some point in the term to serve as president of the executive committee. Both were member of the Socialist Party of Serbia, and, due to divisions within the local party, both resigned from office in July 1996. Miroljub Jovanović, also of the Socialists, was chosen afterward as mayor.

===== Novi Pazar =====
Konstantin Jovanović of the Socialist Party of Serbia served as mayor of Novi Pazar after the election.

===== Vrnjačka Banja =====
In Vrnjačka Banja, incumbent mayor Miroslav Čeperković was confirmed for another term in office after the election.

==== Šumadija District ====
===== Kragujevac =====
Results of the election for the Municipal Assembly of Kragujevac:

Party	Seats
Socialist Party of Serbia	51
United Opposition of Kragujevac	11
Serbian Radical Party	3
Citizens' Group candidates	2
Total	67

Only parties or alliances that won representation in the assembly are listed. Incumbent mayor Živorad Nešić, incumbent deputy mayor Dragić Lazić, and incumbent executive board president Milorad Matić were all confirmed for new terms in their respective offices in January 1993. All were members of the Socialist Party of Serbia.

===== Aranđelovac =====
Milosav Ivović of the Socialist Party of Serbia served as mayor of Aranđelovac after the election.

===== Batočina =====
When the municipal assembly of Batočina convened on 26 January 1993, Petar Petrović was chosen as mayor and Slobodan Popović as vice-president, and Dragan Todorović as president of the executive board. Radoslav Joksimović, as the oldest member, presided over the assembly on a provisional basis.

===== Topola =====
Results of the election for the Municipal Assembly of Topola:

Party	Seats
Democratic Movement of Serbia	23
Socialist Party of Serbia	17
Total	40

Milovan Marinković of the Serbian Renewal Movement served as mayor after the election. Gavrilo Nikolić served as president of the executive board, although he resigned from the role on 10 January 1995, citing divisions within the ruling coalition (which then comprised the Serbian Renewal Movement, the Democratic Party, and the Peasants Party of Serbia). Later in 1995, the Serbian government dissolved the local assembly and appointed a provisional administration led by Žarko Jovanović of the Socialist Party of Serbia.

==== Toplica District ====
===== Prokuplje =====
Siniša Virijević was chosen as mayor of Prokuplje after the election, while Radan Lakićević became president of the assembly's executive committee. Both were members of the Socialist Party of Serbia. Lakićević appears to have succeeded Virijević as mayor on 30 December 1993.

===== Blace =====
Vladimir Mladenović served as mayor of Blace after the election.

===== Kuršumlija =====
Borivoje Urošević of the Socialist Party of Serbia served as mayor of Kuršumlija after the election.

===== Žitorađa =====
Dragan Novaković served as mayor of Žitorađa after the election.

==== Zaječar District ====
===== Zaječar =====
Results of the election for the Municipal Assembly of Zaječar:

Party	Seats
Socialist Party of Serbia	31
Democratic Movement of Serbia	11
Citizens' Group candidates	6
not listed	2
Total	50

Nebojša Simonović, presumably of the Socialists, served as mayor after the election. Olga Živanović was president of the executive committee.

===== Sokobanja =====
Branislav Popović, presumbaly of the Socialist Party of Serbia, served as mayor of Sokobanja after the election.

==== Zlatibor District ====
The Socialist Party of Serbia won the local elections in seven of the ten municipalities of the Zlatibor District. The exceptions were Kosjerić and Nova Varoš, where the opposition parties formed government, and Sjenica, which did not elect a functioning assembly due to an ongoing boycott by members of the area's Bosniak community. The latter jurisdiction was governed by an appointed council, led by a member of the Socialists.

The Socialists brought down the local government of Nova Varoš in April 1996 and formed a new administration in the municipality.

===== Uźice =====
Results of the election for the Municipal Assembly of Užice:

Party	Seats
Socialist Party of Serbia	43
Democratic Movement of Serbia	17
Democratic Party	4
Serbian Radical Party	2
not listed	1
Total	67

Incumbent mayor Zoran Vujović and incumbent executive committee president Milan Marinković were confirmed for new terms in their respective offices after the election, while Vidoje Drndarević and Dušan Nedeljković were chosen as deputy mayors. All were members of the Socialist Party of Serbia. Vujović stood down as mayor in January 1995, shortly after being appointed as a cabinet minister in the government of the Federal Republic of Yugoslavia, and was succeeded by Nedeljković. Radiša Marjanović, also a Socialist, in turn succeeded Nedeljković as a deputy mayor.

===== Arilje =====
Petar Vučićević of the Socialist Party of Serbia served as mayor of Arilje after the election.

===== Bajina Bašta =====
Miloš Mandić of the Socialist Party of Serbia served as mayor of Bajina Bašta after the election.

===== Čajetina =====
Rade Blagojević of the Socialist Party of Serbia served as mayor of Čajetina after the election. Vlado Marjanović served as president of the assembly's executive committee.

===== Kosjerić =====
Kosjerić was the only municipality in the immediate area of Užice that the Socialist Party of Serbia did not win. Novica Pantović of the Democratic Party served as mayor after the election, while Miodrag Marković served as president of the executive committee.

===== Nova Varoš =====
Results of the election for the Municipal Assembly of Nova Varoš:

Party	Seats
Democratic Movement of Serbia	11
Socialist Party of Serbia	9
Democratic Party	4
Serbian Radical Party	2
Citizens' Group candidates	1
Total	27

The Democratic Movement of Serbia (DEPOS) and the Democratic Party (DS) formed a coalition government after the election. Dragutin Kurćubić became mayor, and Slaviša Purić became president of the executive committee; both were members of the Serbian Renewal Movement (SPO), the leading party in the DEPOS alliance. Kurćubić left the SPO in December 1994, causing fractures in the governing coalition, though he ultimately rejoined the party the following year.

The Socialists later won a working majority in the assembly, and on 22 April 1996 they removed Kurćubić and Purić from office. Branislav Dilparić became mayor, while Dragan Obućina was chosen as deputy mayor and Milovan Glavonjić as president of the executive committee; Dilparić and Glavonjić, at least, were members of the Socialist Party.

===== Požega =====
According to the newspaper Borba, Dragan Đuđić of the Socialist Party of Serbia served as mayor of mayor of Požega after the election. If this is correct, he left office before the end of 1993. Slobodan Dragutinović, also of the Socialists, served as mayor from 1993 until the end of the term.

===== Priboj =====
Results of the election for the Municipal Assembly of Priboj:

Party	Seats
Socialist Party of Serbia	25
Democratic Movement of Serbia	4
Serbian Radical Party	4
not listed	8
Total	41

Incumbent mayor Milić Popović of the Socialist Party of Serbia was confirmed for another term in office after the election. Desimir Ćirković, also of the Socialists, served as president of the executive committee.

===== Prijepolje =====
Results of the election for the Municipal Assembly of Prijepolje:

Party	Seats
Socialist Party of Serbia	42
Democratic Movement of Serbia	5
Citizens' Group candidates	4
Serbian Radical Party	4
not listed	2
Total	57

Incumbent mayor Radojko Petrić of the Socialist Party of Serbia was nominated for another term in office at the first meeting of the new assembly. Due to divisions in the ranks of the Socialists, he did not receive enough votes for the position. After some delays, Stevan Purić, also of the Socialist Party, was chosen as mayor in his place.

===== Sjenica =====
Sjenica was governed by a municipal council appointed by the Serbian government. The council's president was Radoslav Rakonjac of the Socialist Party of Serbia, and its vice-president was Mustafa Džigal.

=== Kosovo and Metohija ===
The elections in Kosovo and Metohija were largely boycotted by members of the Kosovo Albanian community, which had set up parallel governing institutions in the province under the name of the Republic of Kosova in 1991.

==== Kosovo District ====
===== Priština =====
Results of the election for the City Assembly of Priština:

Party	Seats
Socialist Party of Serbia	17
Citizens' Group candidates	9
Serbian Radical Party	7
League of Communists – Movement for Yugoslavia	1
deferred	1
Total	35

Only parties or alliances that won representation in the assembly are listed. Incumbent Priština mayor Novica Sojević, incumbent deputy mayor Zvonimir Stević, and incumbent president of the executive board Dušan Simić were all confirmed for new terms in their respective offices after the election. All were members of the Socialist Party of Serbia.

===== Glogovac =====
Glogovac was governed by a municipal council appointed by the Serbian government. The council was initially led by Savo Šćepanović. On 29 September 1993, the Serbian government appointed Ratomir Maksimović as the council's new president and Slavko Đumić as its vice president.

By 1996, Dobrosav Radović was serving as the council's president.

===== Kačanik =====
In Kačanik, the Serbian government appointed a municipal council led by Radosav Ognjanović.

===== Kosovo Polje =====
Results of the election for the Municipal Assembly of Kosovo Polje:

Party	Seats
Socialist Party of Serbia	21
Serbian Radical Party	5
Citizens' Group candidates	3
Social Democratic Party	1
not listed	5
Total	35

Due to extremely strong divisions in the ranks of the Socialists, the assembly was not able to elect a new administration when it first convened. Ratko Maksimović, who served as mayor in the previous term, initially continued to serve in the role on an interim basis. Some prominent members of the Socialist Party encouraged the local assembly to choose Jovan Simić as mayor and Dragutin Milanović as president of the executive committee, but these efforts were not successful. On 23 July 1993, everal months after the election, Dobrica Lazić of the Socialists was finally confirmed as mayor, Novak Bojković as deputy mayor, and Miroslav Sekulić as president of the executive board. Borko Spasić, as the oldest representative, presided over the assembly on an interim basis. All were members of the Socialist Party.

===== Lipljan =====
Vojislav Denić of the Socialist Party of Serbia served as mayor of Lipljan after the election. Milorad Rašić served as president of the assembly's executive committee.

===== Obilić =====
The Serbian government appointed a municipal council to govern Obilić on 10 March 1993. The council's president was Zoran Milošević of the Socialist Party of Serbia, and its vice-president was Dušan Dutina.

===== Podujevo =====
The Serbian Radical Party won the election in Podujevo. When the assembly convened on 20 January 1993, incumbent mayor Dragan Milovanović of the Radicals and incumbent executive committee president Stražimir Ilić were confirmed for new terms in their respective offices, and Miladin Laketić was chosen as deputy mayor. The oldest delegate, Božidar Damjanović, presided over the assembly on an interim basis. According to the Radical Party's 1996 campaign literature, the Socialist Party of Serbia brought down Milovanović's administration later in the term.

===== Štimlje =====
Štimlje was governed by a municipal council, initially led by Novica Kostić. Later in 1993, Kostić was replaced by Svetislav Zakić.

===== Štrpce =====
Bogoljub Janićević of the Socialist Party of Serbia served as the mayor of Štrpce after the election. He stood down on 15 June 1995 and was succeeded by Dragan Veljković.

===== Uroševac =====
When the Uroševac municipal assembly convened on 5 February 1993, incumbent mayor Nebojša Petković was confirmed for another term in office, while Slavko Matović was chosen as deputy mayor and Branislav Radić as president of the executive committee. Vasilije Marković, as the oldest representative, presided over the assembly on an interim basis.

==== Kosovo-Pomoravlje District ====
===== Gnijlane =====
Mladen Jovanović served as mayor of Gnjilane after the election. On 25 February 1994, Momir Cuckić was chosen as president of the assembly's executive committee.

===== Kosovska Kamenica =====
Branimir Filić of the Socialist Party of Serbia served as mayor of Kosovska Kamenica after the election.

===== Vitina =====
Slobodan Stojilković served as mayor of Vitina after the election, while Vesko Pirić of the Socialist Party of Serbia served as president of the assembly's executive committee.

==== Kosovska Mitrovica District ====
===== Kosovska Mitrovica =====
Incumbent Kosovska Mitrovica mayor Predrag Orlić and incumbent executive committee president Zoran Bratić were confirmed for new terms in their respective offices after the election.

===== Leposavić =====
Vukašin Ćirković served as mayor of Leposavić after the election, while Dragan Jablanović of the Socialist Party of Serbia served as president of the executive committee.

===== Srbica =====
Sima Simić of the Socialist Party of Serbia served as president of the Srbica municipal council.

===== Vučitrn =====
When the Vucitrn municipal assembly convened on 3 February 1993, incumbent mayor Branko Stolić and incumbent executive committee president Uroš Stojanović were confirmed for new terms in their respective offices, while Milan Savić was chosen as deputy mayor. The oldest representative, Ilija Nešić, presided over the assembly on a provisional basis.

Ratko Jočić served as president of a Vučitrn municipal council later in the term. Online sources do not confirm if this was the same Ratko Jočić who served as a member of the Kosovo's provincial executive in the same period.

===== Zubin Potok =====
Radiša Kostić of New Democracy served as mayor after the election. Slaviša Ristić of the Democratic Party of Serbia was president of the assembly's executive committee.

===== Zvečan =====
When the Zvečan municipal assembly convened on 29 January 1993, Desimir Petković was chosen as mayor. On 8 February 1993, Milija Janićijević of the Serbian Radical Party was chosen as president of the executive committee.

==== Peć District ====
===== Peć =====
When the Peć municipal assembly convened on 23 January 1993, incumbent mayor Jovo Popović of the Socialist Party of Serbia was confirmed for another term in office. The oldest delegate, Vladimir Bošković, presided over the assembly on a provisional basis.

Popović resigned as mayor on 2 October 1993. On 18 October, Tomo Bijelić was appointed as his successor. Bošković again presided over the assembly on a provisional basis before Bijelić's election.

===== Dečani =====
Dečani was governed by a municipal council led by Milivoje Đurković of the Socialist Party of Serbia.

===== Đakovica =====
When the Đakovica municipal assembly convened on 22 January 1993, incumbent mayor Božidar Dimić and incumbent executive committee president Momčilo Obradović were both confirmed for new terms in their respective offices. The oldest delegate, Božidar Doganžić, presided over the assembly on a provisional basis. On 18 January 1995, the Serbian government appointed a provisional administration led by Đokica Stanojević of the Socialist Party of Serbia; the municipal council included representatives from both the Serb and Albanian communities.

===== Istok =====
When the Istok municipal assembly convened on 28 January 1993, incumbent mayor Mališa Perović of the Socialist Party of Serbia was confirmed for another term in office. On 8 February 1993, Radomir Bojić was chosen as president of the executive committee.

===== Klina =====
When the municipal assembly of Klina convened on 26 January 1993, incumbent mayor Vlado Prodović was confirmed for another term in office, and Miloje Zajić was chosen as president of the executive committee.

==== Prizren District ====
===== Gora =====
When the Gora municipal assembly convened on 27 January 1993, incumbent mayor Harun Hasani of the Socialist Party of Serbia was confirmed for another term in office, while Cufta Abduljhadija became president of the assembly's executive committee. Džafer Džaferi (Xhafer Xhaferi), the oldest representative, presided over the assembly on an interim basis.

On 16 July 1993, Ibro Vait of the Socialist Party was appointed to succeed Abduljhadija as president of the executive committee.

By 1996, Hasani had been succeeded as mayor by Mesip Dalifi, also of the Socialist Party.

===== Suva Reka =====
When the Suva Reka municipal assembly convened on 2 February 1993, incumbent mayor Boban Vuksanović was confirmed for a new term in office, and Milovan Stanojević became deputy mayor. On 12 February 1993, Stanislav Anđelković was chosen as president of the executive committee. All were members of the Socialist Party of Serbia.
