= Rajko Popović =

Serbian journalist and politician

Rajko Popović (Serbian Cyrillic: Рајко Поповић) is a Serbian journalist and former politician. He was the editor-in-chief of the newspaper Komuna for several years, served as mayor of Kikinda on two occasions, and was a member of the presidency of the Vojvodina provincial section of the Socialist Alliance of Working People of Yugoslavia (SSRNJ) in 1989–90. When the Socialist Alliance ceased to exist, he joined the successor Socialist Party of Serbia (SPS).

== Journalist ==
Popović was appointed as editor of the local Kikinda newspaper Komuna in early 1988 and served in this role for several years.

He was president of the publishing council for the newspaper Dnevnik for a time but resigned in February 1990, complaining that he was constantly outvoted at council meetings. He criticized the founding of the Independent Journalists' Association of Vojvodina at around the same time, saying that it created the danger of splitting the Association of Journalists of Yugoslavia in Vojvodina.

Popović was placed on a list of persons who could not obtain visas for European Union (EU) countries on 1 March 2000, on the grounds of his connections with Slobodan Milošević's government. He was still the editor of Komuna at the time of this announcement.

== Politician ==
In the 1988, Popović took part in Vojvodina's so-called anti-bureaucratic revolution, in which allies of Slobodan Milošević won control of the Vojvodina government and the League of Communists of Vojvodina (LSV). Popović led the SSRNJ board in Kikinda during this time and served his first term as the municipality's mayor in 1989.

He was elected to the presidency of the Socialist Alliance in Vojvodina in December 1989 and served in this role until the party's dissolution the following year. He was a frequent critic of the newspaper Borba in this period, describing some articles in the paper as "anti-Serbian." At the Socialist Alliance's final provincial conference in June 1990, he delivered a talk on the future of media operations in Vojvodina.

The Socialist Alliance merged with the League of Communists of Yugoslavia in 1990 to form the Socialist Party of Serbia, and Popović became the leader of the new party's municipal board in Kikinda. The local branch of the party experienced serious divisions in the early 1990s, with Popović, Milorad Blažić, and Dušan Latinović leading rival factions.

Popović ran for the Kikinda constituency seat in the Federal Republic of Yugoslavia's Council of Citizens in the May 1992 parliamentary election and finished third against Serbian Radical Party (SRS) candidate Branislav Blažić, brother of Milorad Blažić.

He was given the twenty-fourth position (out of twenty-eight) on the Socialist Party's electoral list for Zrenjanin in the 1992 Serbian parliamentary election. The list won eight seats, and he was not included in his party's delegation for the new assembly. (From 1992 to 2000, Serbia's electoral law stipulated that one-third of parliamentary mandates would be assigned to candidates from successful lists in numerical order, while the remaining two-thirds would be distributed amongst other candidates at the discretion of the sponsoring parties. Popović could have been given a mandate despite his list position, although in the event he was not.)

Popović was elected to the Kikinda municipal assembly in the December 1992 Serbian local elections, which were held concurrently with the parliamentary vote. The Socialists won a landslide majority victory with forty out of fifty-one seats, and he was chosen as mayor when the assembly convened on 18 January 1993. The local SPS's divisions continued in the years that followed, however, and Popović was removed as mayor on 30 July 1996, having lost the support of several delegates from his own party.

In the 2004 Serbian local elections, Popović led an independent electoral list in Kikinda called For Kikinda in Serbia. The list did not cross the electoral threshold to win any mandates in the local assembly.

== Electoral record ==
=== Federal (FR Yugoslavia) ===
May 1992 Yugoslavian federal election: Kikinda
Candidate	Party	Votes	%
Branislav Blažić	Serbian Radical Party	20,067	27.10
Bálint Antal	Democratic Fellowship of Vojvodina Hungarians	18,868	25.48
Rajko Popović	Socialist Party of Serbia	12,336	16.66
Jandrija Lukač	League of Communists – Movement for Yugoslavia	4,258	5.75
Ivan Glavaški	Citizens' Group	4,099	5.54
Mirko Knežević	Citizens' Group	3,563	4.81
Branislav Knežević	Citizens' Group	2,890	3.90
Đuro Popeskov	Citizens' Group	2,359	3.19
Milan Ivošević	People's Party	2,143	2.89
Miklós Maróti	Citizens' Group	1,963	2.65
Rudolf Czegledi	Citizens' Group	1,501	2.03
Total		74,047	100.00
