= Branimir Filić =

Serbian politician (born 1961)

Branimir Filić (Serbian Cyrillic: Бранимир Филић; born 1961), known as Baki, is a Serbian former politician. During the 1990s, Filić served in the Yugoslavian and Serbian parliaments and was the mayor of Kosovska Kamenica. During his political career, Filić was a member of the Socialist Party of Serbia (SPS).

== Private career ==
Filić holds a Bachelor of Laws degree. He moved to Niš in Central Serbia following his political career and has worked as a lawyer.

He applied to become Niš's chief of police in 2012.

== Politician ==
During the 1990s, the Socialist Party dominated Serbian politics under the authoritarian rule of Slobodan Milošević.

Filić was elected to the Federal Republic of Yugoslavia's Chamber of Citizens for the Gnjilane division in the May 1992 Yugoslavian parliamentary election. This election was boycotted, for different reasons, by many of Serbia's leading opposition parties and by most of Kosovo's majority Albanian population; largely due to this situation, Filić won a majority victory on the basis of only 14.23% participation from the electorate. The Socialists, in any event, won a majority victory in the assembly, and Filić served as a government supporter.

Due to ongoing skepticism about the legitimacy of the May vote, a new Yugoslavian parliamentary election was held in December 1992. Prior to the election, the federal republic adopted a system of full proportional representation. Filić appeared in the eleventh position (out of eleven) on the Socialist Party's electoral list for the Leskovac division. The list won seven seats, and he did not receive a new mandate. (At the time, Yugoslavia's electoral rules stipulated that one-third of the mandates in the Chamber of Citizens would be assigned to candidates on successful lists in numerical order, while the remaining two-thirds would be distributed amongst other candidates on the same lists at the discretion of the sponsoring parties. Filić could have received a new mandate despite his list position, but ultimately he did not.) His parliamentary term ended when the new federal assembly met in January 1993. He was, however, elected to municipal assembly of Kosovska Kamenica in the December 1992 Serbian local elections, which took place concurrently with the federal vote, and was chosen afterward as assembly president, a position that was then equivalent to mayor.

Filić later appeared in the sixteenth position on the Socialist Party's list for Leskovac in the 1993 Serbian parliamentary election. The Socialists won a landslide victory in the division, taking seventeen seats. Serbian elections were held under the same "one-third, two-thirds" rule as Yugoslavian elections in this period, and Filić was given one of his party's "optional" mandates, taking his seat when the new republican assembly convened in January 1994. The Socialists fell just short of a majority victory overall with 123 out of 250 seats and afterward formed a new administration with support from the small New Democracy (ND) party. Filić served a member of the defence and security committee.

The Socialist Party contested the 1997 Serbian parliamentary election in a coalition with New Democracy and the Yugoslav Left (JUL). Filić appeared in the ninth position (out of ten) on the coalition's list for the smaller, redistributed division of Vranje. The list won five seats, and he did not receive a mandate for a new term.

== Electoral record ==
=== Federal (FR Yugoslavia) ===
May 1992 Yugoslavian federal election: Gnjilane
Candidate	Party	Votes	%
Branimir Filić	Socialist Party of Serbia	16,644	59.65
Dragan H. Katanić	Serbian Radical Party	9,198	32.96
Tomislav Jovanović	League of Communists – Movement for Yugoslavia	2,063	7.39
Total		27,905	100.00
