= Stanko Terzić =

Serbian politician

Stanko Terzić (Serbian Cyrillic: Станко Терзић; born 7 January 1952) is a Serbian retired politician. He was a member of the Yugoslavian parliament from 1992 to 1993 and served as mayor of Valjevo from 2012 to 2016. Terzić is a member of the Socialist Party of Serbia (SPS).

== Early life and private career ==
Terzić was born in Valjevo, in what was then the People's Republic of Serbia in the Federal People's Republic of Yugoslavia. He graduated from the University of Belgrade Faculty of Natural Sciences and Mathematics in 1975 and worked as a math professor and administrator at Valjevo's Agricultural School. Later, he was an education advisor for the Inter-Municipal Institute for the Improvement of Education in the same city. Terzić was the director of Valjevo's Cultural Centre from 2005 to 2007.

== Politician ==
=== The Milošević Years ===
During the 1990s, the political culture of Serbia and Yugoslavia was dominated by the authoritarian rule of Slobodan Milošević, the leader of the Socialist Party of Serbia. Terzić was president of the SPS's municipal board in Valjevo in the early 1990s.

The Federal Republic of Yugoslavia was constituted on 27 April 1992, and its first parliamentary election took place on 31 May 1992 under a system of mixed proportional representation. Terzić was elected to the Chamber of Citizens for the Valjevo constituency seat as a Socialist Party candidate. The Socialists and their Montenegrin allies won a landslide majority victory overall, in part because of a boycott by several prominent Serbian opposition parties.

Due to ongoing doubts about the legitimacy of the May 1992 vote, a new federal parliamentary election took place in December 1992, this time under a system of full proportional representation. Terzić appeared in the seventh position on the Socialist Party's electoral list for the Užice division and did not receive a mandate when the list won five seats. (At the time, Yugoslavia's electoral rules stipulated that one-third of the mandates in the Chamber of Citizens would be assigned to candidates on successful lists in numerical order, while the remaining two-thirds would be distributed amongst other candidates on the same lists at the discretion of the sponsoring parties. Terzić could have received a new mandate despite his list position, but this did not happen; the Socialist Party assigned all of its "optional" mandates in Užice in numerical order.) His parliamentary term ended when the new assembly met in January 1993.

The Socialists won the December 1992 local elections in Valjevo, which were held concurrently with the federal vote. Terzić was appointed afterward as president of the municipal assembly's executive board, effectively making him the leader of the local government. He held this role for a year before being appointed as president of the Kolubara District.

=== Since 2000 ===
Slobodan Milošević was defeated in the 2000 Yugoslavian presidential election and fell from power on 5 October 2000, a watershed moment in Serbian and Yugoslavian politics. Although the Socialists remained part of a transitional government in Serbia until January 2001, the party moved afterward into opposition. Terzić's tenure as president of the Kolubara District ended in 2001.

Terzić appeared in the fifth position on the Socialist Party's electoral list for Valjevo in the 2008 local elections and received a city assembly mandate after the list won six seats. The For a European Serbia (ZES) alliance led by the Democratic Party (DS) won the election and afterward formed a coalition government with the Socialists: Zoran Jakovljević of the Democratic Party became mayor, and Terzić was chosen as deputy mayor. He served in the role for the next four years.

The Socialists won a narrow plurality victory in Valjevo in the 2012 Serbian local elections, taking eleven out of fifty-one seats in a very divided assembly. Terzić, who appeared in the fourth position on the SPS list, was re-elected to the city assembly and was chosen as mayor when the assembly convened on 6 July 2012. He served for the four-year term that followed.

Terzić again appeared in the fourth position on the SPS's list in the 2016 Serbian local elections and was re-elected when the list won eighteen seats, finishing second against a coalition list led by the Serbian Progressive Party (SNS). He resigned his assembly seat on 21 June 2016 in order to become the new mayor's assistant for social and humanitarian affairs. He resigned from this office as well in November 2016 on taking retirement.

Terzić later received the sixteenth position on the Socialist Party's list for Valjevo in the 2020 local elections and was elected to another term in the municipal assembly when the list won exactly sixteen seats. As the oldest member of the new assembly, he served as its president (i.e., speaker) at its first meeting on 18 August 2020, prior to the election of the city's new officials. He resigned his seat on 10 March 2022.

== Electoral record ==
=== Federal (FR Yugoslavia) ===
May 1992 Yugoslavian federal election: Valjevo
Candidate	Party	Votes	%
Stanko Terzić	Socialist Party of Serbia	41,438	58.33
Božidar Branković	Serbian Radical Party	25,790	36.30
Velibor Đorđević	League of Communists – Movement for Yugoslavia	3,817	5.37
Total		71,045	100.00
