= Mesip Dalifi =

Serbian politician

Mesip Dalifi (Serbian Cyrillic: Месип Далифи; born 1952) is a Serbian educator and former politician from the country's Gorani community. He served as the mayor of Gora in the 1990s and early 2000s and was a member of the Chamber of the Citizens in the Yugoslavian parliament from 1996 to 2000. During his political career, Dalifi was a member of the Socialist Party of Serbia (SPS).

== Private career ==
Dalifi served for many years as the principal of the "Nebojša Jerković" elementary school in Gora/Dragaš. In May 2013, he oversaw an excursion of students from the school to Belgrade, Novi Sad, and Subotica.

In 1979–80, an individual named Mesip Dalifi served as chair of the Committee for Physical Culture, Sports and Recreation of the Republic Conference of the Sports Association of Serbia. It is not clear if this was the same person.

== Politician ==
Serbian politics in the 1990s was dominated by the authoritarian rule of Slobodan Milošević, leader of the Socialist Party. In Kosovo, the province's majority Albanian community generally boycotted Serbian state institutions in this period.

=== Mayor of Gora ===
The Socialists won the December 1992 local elections in Gora. Initially, the incumbent mayor Harun Hasani was confirmed for another term in office. Before the term was over, however, Hasani was succeeded by Dalifi.

In July 1995, Dalifi took part in a delegation of Gora municipal government officials to Novi Sad. The delegates met with Novi Sad mayor Đuro Bajić and discussed greater economic cooperation between the communities.

The Socialists won a landslide victory in Gora in the 1996 Serbian local elections, taking twenty-seven of twenty-nine seats. Dalifi was chosen for another term as mayor and continued to be recognized by the Serbian government following the 1998–99 Kosovo War, in which Serbia lost effective control over most of the province, Gora included. In February 2001, Dalifi, Hasani, and Ibro Vait met with Yugoslavian president Vojislav Koštunica to discuss the situation of the Gorani in post-war Kosovo. Hasani's mayoral term does not appear to have extended past 2002.

=== Yugoslavian parliamentarian ===
The Socialist Party contested the 1996 Yugoslavian parliamentary election in an alliance with the Yugoslav Left (JUL) and New Democracy (ND). Dalifi appeared on the alliance's electoral list for the Chamber of Citizens in the Peć electoral district (which included Gora) and was elected when the party won a landslide victory with almost eighty per cent of the vote, winning all five available seats. The SPS's alliance won the election and afterward formed a new coalition government with its Montenegrin allies; Dalifi served as a government supporter.

In a 1998 assembly exchange about human rights in Kosovo, Dalifi said, "In Serbia, other national minorities enjoy their rights. I am a Muslim and I enjoy my rights. It is because of separatism that some people do not enjoy these rights." The latter comment was made in reference to support for Kosovo's independence among some members of the Albanian community.

He was not a candidate in the 2000 Yugoslavian parliamentary election, and his term as a parliamentarian ended that year.
