= Aleksandar Cvetković =

Aleksandar Cvetković may refer to:

- Aleksandar Cvetković (basketball)
- Aleksandar Cvetković (footballer)
- Aleksandar Cvetković (politician)
