= Milosav Ivović =

Serbian politician (born 1945)

Milosav Ivović (Serbian Cyrillic: Милосав Ивовић; born 1945) is a Serbian former politician. He served as the mayor of Aranđelovac in the 1990s and was a member of the Serbian parliament from 1993 to 1994. During his political career, Ivović was a member of the Socialist Party of Serbia (SPS).

== Private career ==
Ivović was born in Aranđelovac and was raised in the People's Republic of Serbia in the Federal People's Republic of Yugoslavia. He is a graduated mining engineer.

== Politician ==
Milan Švabić became the president of the Aranđelovac municipal assembly, a position that was then equivalent to mayor, after the 1989 Serbian local elections; Ivović served as the assembly's vice-president. In December 1991, Svabić stood down as mayor due to his other responsibilities, and Ivović was chosen as his successor on an interim basis. Available online sources do not clarify if Ivović continued in the role after the May 1992 Serbian local elections.

The first elections for the Chamber of Citizens in the Federal Republic of Yugoslavia took place in May 1992, concurrent with the local Serbian vote. Half of the Serbian seats in the federal parliament were determined by first-past-the-post elections in single-member constituency seats and the other half by proportional representation. Ivović appeared in the fifty-third position out of fifty-four on the Socialist Party's electoral list and was not elected when the party won thirty-one proportional seats. All subsequent federal Yugoslavian parliamentary elections took place under a system of full proportional representation in multi-member constituency seats.

Ivović later appeared in the tenth position on the Socialist Party's list for the Kragujevac division in the 1992 Serbian parliamentary election. The list won eleven seats, and he was given a mandate when the national assembly convened in January 1993. (From 1992 to 2000, Serbia's electoral law stipulated that one-third of parliamentary mandates would be assigned to candidates from successful lists in numerical order, while the remaining two-thirds would be distributed amongst other candidates at the discretion of the sponsoring parties. It was common practice for the latter mandates to be awarded out of numerical order. Ivović's position on the list did not give him the automatic right to a mandate, but he was included in his party's delegation all the same.) In parliament, Ivović served on the committee on trade and tourism. The Socialists won the largest number of seats in the 1992 parliamentary election but fell short of a majority; for a time, the party governed through an informal alliance with the far-right Serbian Radical Party (SRS).

Ivović was also elected to the Aranđelovac municipal assembly in the December 1992 Serbian local elections, which took place concurrently with the parliamentary vote, and was subsequently elected by the assembly for another term as mayor.

The Socialist–Radical alliance in the national assembly broke down in mid-1993, and a new parliamentary election was held in December of that year. Ivović appeared in the ninth position on the Socialist Party's list for Kragujevac. Although the list won twelve seats, he was not given a new mandate, and his term ended when the new assembly convened in January 1994.

The Socialists won a majority victory in Aranđelovac in the 1996 local elections with thirty-two out of forty-one seats, and Ivović was once again chosen as the municipality's mayor.

Ivović appeared in the fourth position out of four on a combined Socialist Party–Yugoslav Left (JUL) electoral list for Kragujevac in the 2000 Yugoslavian parliamentary election. The list won two seats, and he once again did not receive a federal mandate. The Democratic Opposition of Serbia (DOS) won a majority victory in Aranđelovac in the concurrent 2000 local elections, and his term as mayor came to an end shortly thereafter.
