= Zoran Milošević (Serbian politician, born 1958) =

Serbian politician

Zoran Milošević (Serbian Cyrillic: Зоран Милошевић; born 5 January 1958) is a Serbian politician. He was the mayor of Obilić in the 1990s and served in the Serbian parliament from 1997 to 2001. Milošević has at different times been a member of the Socialist Party of Serbia (SPS), the Serbian Social Democratic Party (SSDP), and the Serbian Progressive Party (SNS).

== Private career ==
Milošević is a stomatologist.

== Politician ==
=== Kosovo Serb community leader ===
Milošević emerged as a prominent figure in the Kosovo Serb community in 1988 while serving as president of the local community council in Obilić, then located in the Socialist Autonomous Province of Kosovo. On a number of occasions, he charged that local Serbs and Montenegrins were facing threats of emigration due to intimidation from some members of the Albanian community; he also accused the managers of the Kosovo Electric Power Company of pursuing a secessionist agenda. These statements occurred against a general backdrop of increased tensions between Serbs and Albanians in the province, which was exploited by Slobodan Milošević (no relation) to facilitate his own political ascendancy.

In July 1988, Milošević became the leader of a local Obilić working group that examined the complaints of Serbs and Montenegrins in the community. In September of the same year, he addressed a solidarity rally for Kosovo Serbs at Bojnik in Central Serbia, saying "We will not move from Kosovo. We will not abandon our centuries-old homes even though our personal and national integrity, property and human dignity are threatened. We have decided to fight our enemy to the end."

Relations between Serbs and Albanians in Kosovo continued to worsen after this time, and in 1990 most Albanians in the province began a boycott of Serbian state institutions. Milošević joined the Socialist Party of Serbia on its founding in the same year; the Socialists dominated Serbian politics for the next decade under Slobodan Milošević's authoritarian leadership.

=== Mayor of Obilić ===
Due in part to the Albanian boycott, the December 1992 Serbian local elections did not produce a viable assembly in the Obilić municipality, and in early 1993 the Serbian government appointed a municipal council led by Milošević. The local Socialist organization in Obilić was divided in this period, and there were some attempts to remove him from office; at one point, his rivals temporarily succeeded in removing him from the party. This notwithstanding, he ultimately served for the full term. In July 1995, he inaugurated a statue of Serbian hero Miloš Obilić in the municipality's main square.

The Socialist Party won a landslide majority in Obilić in the 1996 Serbian local elections, which took place in spite of the continued Albanian boycott; the party won thirty-four out of thirty-seven seats. Milošević served afterward as president of the assembly, a position that was then equivalent to mayor. He greeted Serbian president Slobodan Milošević at an event in nearby Priština in June 1997, presenting him with the "Milos Obilić" Golden Plaque and "Milos Obilić" Charter.

Serbia lost effective control over Obilić after the end of the Kosovo War in 1999, and Milošević's term as mayor ended at this time.

=== Parliamentarian ===
Milošević was given the sixth position (out of eleven) on a Socialist-led coalition electoral list for the Priština division in the 1997 Serbian parliamentary election. The list won seven seats in the division, and he was assigned a mandate. (From 1992 to 2000, Serbia's electoral law stipulated that one-third of parliamentary mandates would be assigned to candidates from successful lists in numerical order, while the remaining two-thirds would be distributed amongst other candidates at the discretion of the sponsoring parties. Milošević was not automatically elected by virtue of his list position, but he received a seat in the assembly all the same.) The Socialist alliance won a plurality victory in the election, and the Socialist Party later formed a coalition government with the Yugoslav Left (JUL) and the far-right Serbian Radical Party (SRS). Milošević served as a government supporter.

Slobodan Milošević was defeated in the 2000 Yugoslavian presidential election and subsequently fell from power on 5 October 2000. This was a watershed moment in Serbian politics; the Serbian government fell shortly thereafter, and a new Serbian parliamentary election was called for December 2000. Prior to the vote, Serbia's electoral system was reformed such that the entire country became a single at-large electoral division and all parliamentary mandates were assigned to candidates on successful lists at the discretion of the sponsoring parties or coalitions, irrespective of numerical order.

The Socialist Party experienced a number of splits after Milošević's fall from power, and in November 2000 former Yugoslavian president Zoran Lilić established a breakaway organization called the Serbian Social Democratic Party. Milošević joined Lilić's party and appeared in the eighty-second position on its electoral list for the December 2000 election. The party did not cross the electoral threshold for assembly representation, Milošević's term ended when the new assembly convened in January 2001. By this time, he had relocated to Aranđelovac in Central Serbia.

=== Local politician in Aranđelovac ===
Milošević later joined the Serbian Progressive Party, and he was given the tenth position on the party's list in the 2010 off-year local election in Aranđelovac. The list won twelve seats, and he was given a mandate in the local assembly. The Progressives originally served in opposition for the term that followed, but they formed government following a local political realignment in 2012. Milošević did not seek re-election in 2014.
