= Radan Lakićević =

Serbian politician (1956–2022)

Radan M. Lakićević (Serbian Cyrillic: Радан М. Лакићевић; 1956 – 2022) was a Serbian educator, entrepreneur, and politician. He was the mayor of Prokuplje in the 1990s and was a member of the Serbian parliament from 1999 to 2001. During his political career, Lakićević was a member of the Socialist Party of Serbia (SPS).

== Early life and career ==
Lakićević was born in Podujevo, in what was then the Autonomous Region of Kosovo and Metohija in the People's Republic of Serbia, Federal People's Republic of Yugoslavia. He graduated from the Faculty of Economics in Niš and worked as director of the company Prokupac in Prokuplje.

== Politician ==
Lakićević was elected to the Prokuplje municipal assembly in the December 1992 Serbian local elections. When the assembly convened in early 1993, he was chosen as president of the assembly's executive committee. Later in the term, he succeeded Siniša Virijević as the municipality's mayor. In June 1996, he was one of a number of Socialist politicians who encouraged Slobodan Milošević, then the president of Serbia, to seek the office of president of Yugoslavia. Lakićević stood down as mayor after the 1996 local elections and was president of the Socialist Party's committee for the Toplica District.

The Socialist Party contested the 1997 Serbian parliamentary election in an alliance with the Yugoslav Left (JUL) and New Democracy (ND). Lakićević appeared in the second position out of six on the alliance's list for the Prokuplje division. The list won two seats, and he was not initially given a mandate. (From 1992 to 2000, Serbia's electoral law stipulated that one-third of parliamentary mandates would be assigned to candidates from successful lists in numerical order, while the remaining two-thirds would be distributed amongst other candidates at the discretion of the sponsoring parties. Lakićević was not automatically elected by virtue of his list position, and he did not receive an "optional" mandate.) After the election, the Socialists formed a coalition government with the Yugoslav Left and the Serbian Radical Party (SRS).

Lakićević was awarded a national assembly mandate on 4 February 1999 as a replacement for Ratomir Vico, who had resigned to take on a diplomatic role. He served as a member of the assembly for the next two years and was not a candidate in the 2000 Serbian parliamentary election; his term ended when the new assembly convened in January 2001.

== After Politics ==
Lakićević founded the Higher School of Economics, the first private higher education institution in Niš, in 2005. Three years later, he founded the College of Professional Studies for Criminology and Security in the same city. In 2009, he defended his doctoral dissertation.

Lakićević continued to oversee the College of Professional Studies for Criminology and Security for the remainder of his life. He died in Niš in 2022.
