= Miroslav Janković (Serbian politician, born 1954) =

Serbian politician (born 1954)

Miroslav Janković (Serbian Cyrillic: Мирослав Јанковић; born 16 December 1954) is a Serbian former politician. He was the deputy mayor of the Belgrade municipality of Zvezdara from 1993 to 1994 and was a member of the Serbian parliament from 2004 to 2007. At different times in his political career, Janković was a member of the Democratic Party (DS), the Movement for a Democratic Serbia (PDS), the People's Democratic Party (NDS), and the Democratic Party of Serbia (DSS).

== Early life and career ==
Janković was born in Belgrade, in what was then the People's Republic of Serbia in the Federal People's Republic of Yugoslavia. He graduated in 1978 from the University of Belgrade Faculty of Philology, Department of South Slavic Philology, and earned the title of professor of the Serbo-Croatian language and Yugoslav literature.

He worked for the Serbian Academy of Sciences and Arts (SANU) as an expert researcher-associate, for the Organomatik institute as editor of the magazine Organizacija i kadrovi, and as a personnel trainer under the auspices of the Organisation for Economic Co-operation and Development (OECD). He began working as a professional journalist in 1984 and has been editor-in-chief of the publication Sekundarne sirovine.

== Politician ==
=== Democratic Party ===
Janković was elected to the Zvezdara municipal assembly as a Democratic Party candidate in the December 1992 Serbian local elections. The Democratic Movement of Serbia (DEPOS) coalition won a plurality victory in this election with twenty-five seats out of fifty-three, while the DS won six seats in total. DEPOS formed a coalition government after the election, and Janković was chosen as vice-president of the assembly, a position that was then equivalent to deputy mayor.

He also appeared in the forty-sixth position (out of forty-six) on the Democratic Party's electoral list for the Belgrade division in the 1992 Serbian parliamentary election, which took place concurrently with the local vote. The list won five seats, and he did not receive a mandate. (From 1992 to 2000, Serbia's electoral law stipulated that one-third of parliamentary mandates would be assigned to candidates from successful lists in numerical order, while the remaining two-thirds would be distributed amongst other candidates at the discretion of the sponsoring parties. Janković could have been given a mandate despite his list position, but he was not.)

Janković was promoted to the thirty-seventh position on the DS's list for Belgrade in the 1993 parliamentary election. The list won eight seats, and he was again not given a mandate.

The Democratic Party left Zvezdara's municipal government in November 1994, and Janković stood down as deputy mayor. The DS later joined a coalition called Zajedno in early 1996. Janković was re-elected to the Zvezdara assembly as a Zajedno candidate in the 1996 Serbian local elections when the coalition won a majority victory with forty seats. He served for the term that followed and was not a candidate for re-election in 2000.

=== Movement for a Democratic Serbia ===
In 2000, Slobodan Vuksanović left the Democratic Party and, after briefly serving as a member of Otpor, joined the Movement for a Democratic Serbia. Janković followed Vuksanović into the PDS and served for a time as president of its executive board.

=== People's Democratic Party ===
Vuksanović subsequently left the PDS in 2001 and established the People's Democratic Party, with himself in the role of leader. Janković again followed Vuksanović into the new party and was chosen in November 2001 as one of its vice-presidents.

The NDS contested the 2003 Serbian parliamentary election on the electoral list of the Democratic Party of Serbia. By this time, Serbia's electoral laws had been reformed such that the entire country was a single electoral unit and all mandates were awarded to candidates on successful lists at the discretion of the sponsoring parties or coalitions, irrespective of numerical order. Janković appeared in the eleventh position on the DSS's list and was given a parliamentary mandate after the list won fifty-three seats. The NDS had three parliamentary representatives in total in this period. The DSS ultimately emerged as the dominant party in Serbia's coalition government after the 2003 election, and the NDS members served as part of the DSS assembly group.

In August 2004, Janković announced that the NDS representatives would leave the DSS assembly group, given that the two parties were running separately in the upcoming 2004 Serbian local elections. He clarified that the NDS would continue to support the government.

=== Democratic Party of Serbia ===
The NDS merged outright into the Democratic Party of Serbia after the 2004 local elections, and Janković became a DSS member. In the assembly, he served as a member of the committee on constitutional issues and the committee on culture and information.

The DSS fielded a combined electoral list with New Serbia (NS) in the 2007 Serbian parliamentary election. Janković appeared in the 186th position on the list and was not given a new mandate after it won forty-seven seats. He does not appear to have returned to political life since this time.
