= Radenko Topalović =

Serbian politician

Radenko Topalović (Serbian Cyrillic: Раденко Топаловић; born 15 June 1936) is a Serbian medical doctor and former politician. He has served in the Serbian parliament and the Vojvodina provincial assembly and was the mayor of Pančevo from 1993 to 1996. During his time as an elected official, Topalović was a member of the Socialist Party of Serbia (SPS).

== Early life and private career ==
Topalović was born in the village of Carina in the municipality of Osečina, in what was then the Drina Banovina of the Kingdom of Yugoslavia. Raised in the Federal People's Republic of Yugoslavia after World War II, he graduated from the University of Belgrade Faculty of Medicine and worked afterward as a specialist doctor. He has written a book entitled, Chronicle of the Pančevo Hospital's Children's Ward, 1951-2006 (2007).

== Politician ==
During the 1990s, Serbian political life was dominated by the authoritarian rule of SPS leader Slobodan Milošević.

Topalović was elected to the Vojvodina assembly for Pančevo's fourth division in the May 1992 provincial election. The Socialists won a landslide majority victory, due in part to a boycott by many of Serbia's opposition parties, and he served afterward as a supporter of the provincial administration. He was re-elected in the December 1992 provincial election, in which the Socialists won a significantly reduced victory.

Topalović was also elected to the Pančevo municipal assembly in the December 1992 Serbian local elections, which took place concurrently with the provincial vote. The SPS won the election and afterwards formed a new local government. Topalović was chosen as president of the assembly, a position that was then equivalent to mayor, on 25 November 1993, following the resignation of the previous office-holder.

In the subsequent 1993 Serbian parliamentary election, which took place in December of that year, Topalović was given the second position on the Socialist Party's electoral list for the Zrenjanin division and was elected when the list won ten seats. (From 1992 to 2000, Serbia's electoral law stipulated that one-third of parliamentary mandates would be assigned to candidates from successful lists in numerical order, while the remaining two-thirds would be distributed amongst other candidates on the same lists at the discretion of the sponsoring parties. Topalović was automatically elected by virtue of his list position and took his seat when the assembly met in January 1994.) The Socialists won a strong plurality victory overall in the 1993 election and afterward formed a new government with support from the New Democracy (ND) party. In the assembly, Topalović served on the committee for health, demographic policy, and family.

In September 1996, Topalović reopened Pančevo's reconstructed Paje Marganovića Street, an important route toward Kovin.

Topalović was re-elected for Pančevo's eighth division in the 1996 Vojvodina provincial election, as the Socialists returned to majority status overall in the provincial assembly. The opposition Zajedno (English: Together) coalition defeated the Socialists in Pančevo in the concurrent 1996 local elections, and he was succeeded as mayor by Srđan Miković shortly thereafter. He was not a candidate in the 1997 Serbian parliamentary election, and his national assembly term ended in that year.

Slobodan Milošević fell from power soon after being defeated in the 2000 Yugoslavian presidential election, a watershed moment in Serbian politics. Topalović was not a candidate in the concurrent 2000 Vojvodina provincial election, and he was defeated in his bid for re-election to the local assembly in the 2000 Serbian local elections. He does not appear to have returned to political life after this time.

== Electoral record ==
=== Provincial (Vojvodina) ===
1996 Vojvodina provincial election: Pančevo Division 8
Candidate	Party	Votes	%
Radenko Topalović (incumbent for Pančevo Division 4)	Socialist Party of Serbia		elected
other candidates			
Total			

December 1992 Vojvodina provincial election: Pančevo Division 4
Candidate	Party	Votes	%
Radenko Topalović (incumbent)	Socialist Party of Serbia		elected
Slavko Ankić	Serbian Radical Party		
Petar Jojić	Democratic People's Party		
Jovan Oka	Democratic Movement of Serbia		
Total			
Source: All candidates except Topalović are listed alphabetically.

May 1992 Vojvodina provincial election: Pančevo Division 4 (Second Round)
Candidate	Party	Votes	%
Radenko Topalović	Socialist Party of Serbia		elected
Slavko Beksedić	Serbian Radical Party		
Total			

=== Local (Pančevo) ===
2000 Pančevo municipal election: Pančevo Division 37 (Gornji Grad Division 10)
Candidate	Party	Votes	%
Milan Josimov	Democratic Opposition of Serbia		elected
Dušan Antonijev Duca	Democratic Movement of Pančevo		
Stanislava Bubnjević	Citizens' Group		
Stevan Reljin	Serbian Radical Party		
Radenko Topalović	Socialist Party of Serbia		
Total			
Source: All candidates except Josimov are listed alphabetically.
