= Milovan Stanojević =

Serbian politician

Milovan Stanojević (Serbian Cyrillic: Милован Станојевић; born 1959) is a Serbian former politician. He was the deputy mayor of Suva Reka in the 1990s and served in the Serbian parliament from 1997 to 2001. During his political career, Stanojević was a member of the Socialist Party of Serbia (SPS).

== Early life and career ==
Stanojević was born to a Serb family in the village of Mušutište near Suva Reka, in what was then the Autonomous Region of Kosovo and Metohija in the People's Republic of Serbia, Federal People's Republic of Yugoslavia. He has a degree in chemical engineering. During the 1990s, he was the director of the wine manufacturing company Metohijavino.

== Politician ==
During the 1990s, the Socialist Party dominated Serbian politics under the authoritarian rule of Slobodan Milošević. In addition, the majority Albanian community of Kosovo largely boycotted Serbian state institutions during this time.

Stanojević was elected to the Suva Reka municipal assembly in the December 1992 Serbian local elections, for the second division in Mušutište. When the assembly convened on 2 February 1993, he was chosen as its vice-president, a position that was then equivalent to deputy mayor. He was re-elected to the local assembly in the 1996 Serbian local elections, in which the Socialist Party won all twenty-seven available seats. In this period, he was the leader of the Socialist Party's municipal board for the Suva Reka municipality.

The Socialist Party contested the 1997 Serbian parliamentary election in an alliance with the Yugoslav Left (JUL) and New Democracy (ND). Stanojević appeared in the sixth position out of fourteen on the alliance's electoral list for the Peć division and was awarded a mandate when the list won twelve seats. (From 1992 to 2000, Serbia's electoral law stipulated that one-third of parliamentary mandates would be assigned to candidates on successful lists in numerical order, with the remaining two-thirds distributed to other candidates at the discretion of the sponsoring parties or coalitions. Stanojević was not automatically elected but received a mandate all the same.) The Socialist-led alliance won the election, and the Socialists subsequently formed a new coalition government with the Yugoslav Left and the Serbian Radical Party (SRS). Stanojević served as a government supporter.

Serbia lost effective control over Suva Reka after the end of the Kosovo War in 1999. Slobodan Milošević later lost the 2000 Yugoslavian presidential election and fell from power on 5 October 2000, bringing an end to the Socialist Party's dominance of Serbian politics.

Serbia's government also fell after Milošević's defeat in the Yugoslavian vote, and a new parliamentary election was scheduled for December 2000. Prior to the vote, Serbia's electoral laws were reformed such that the entire country became a single at-large electoral division and all mandates were assigned to candidates on successful lists at the discretion of the sponsoring parties or coalitions, irrespective of numerical order. Stanojević appeared in the 220th position (out of 250) on the Socialist Party's list, which was mostly alphabetical. The list won thirty-seven seats, and he was not assigned a new mandate. His term ended when the new assembly convened in January 2001.
