= Vasa Relić =

Serbian politician

Vasa Relić (Serbian Cyrillic: Васа Релић; born 31 January 1947) is a Serbian politician. He was the mayor of Sombor from 1993 to 1996 and served in the Serbian parliament from 1994 to 1997. Relić is a member of the Socialist Party of Serbia (SPS).

== Early life and career ==
Raised in Sombor, Relić graduated from the Faculty of Technical Sciences in Novi Sad with a degree in mechanical engineering. He worked at the Bane Sekulić metal goods factory, rising to the position of general manager. He later became director of the Sombor office for Instel-Inženjering in 2004 and in this capacity oversaw telephone and gas pipeline installations. In October 2011, he began working as a contract damage assessor for Dunav osiguranje.

== Politician ==
=== Mayor and parliamentarian (1993–97) ===
Relić was elected to the Sombor city assembly in the December 1992 Serbian local elections. The Socialists won a majority victory in the city with thirty-two out of fifty-five seats; when the assembly convened on 28 January 1993, Relić was chosen as its president, a position that was at the time equivalent to mayor.

He later appeared in the eighth position on the Socialist Party's electoral list for the Novi Sad constituency, which included Sombor, in the 1993 Serbian parliamentary election. The party won thirteen seats in the division, and he was included in its parliamentary delegation, taking his seat when the assembly met in January 1994. (From 1992 to 2000, Serbia's electoral law stipulated that one-third of parliamentary mandates would be assigned to candidates from successful lists in numerical order, while the remaining two-thirds would be distributed amongst other candidates at the discretion of the sponsoring parties. Relić was not automatically elected by virtue of his list position, though he received a mandate all the same.)

The Socialists won the 1993 election with 123 seats out of 250 and afterward formed a new government with support from the New Democracy (ND) party. In the assembly, Relić served on the committee for relations with Serbs outside Serbia

The opposition Zajedno coalition won an unexpectedly strong victory in Sombor in the 1996 Serbian local elections, taking thirty seats in the city assembly. Relić was not personally re-elected, and he was succeeded as mayor by Goran Bulajić in December 1996. He was not a candidate in the 1997 Serbian parliamentary election.

=== Since 2009 ===
After a number of years away from politics, Relić was elected as president of the Socialist Party's city board in Sombor in July 2009.

In the 2012 Serbian local elections, Relić appeared in the seventh position on a combined list of the Socialist Party and the Social Democratic Party of Serbia (SDP Serbia) in Sombor. Due to a reform in Serbia's electoral system the previous year, all mandates were awarded to candidates on successful lists in numerical order. The SPS–SDP Serbia list won five seats, and Relić was not initially elected, although he received a mandate when the assembly convened on 21 June 2012 due to the resignation of another SPS member. His return to the city assembly was in any event brief. The Democratic Party (DS) won a narrow victory in the 2012 election and afterward formed a coalition administration that included the SPS. On the same day that the assembly convened, Relić was named as the city's deputy mayor, which was by this time an executive rather than a legislative position, and so was required to resign his seat.

Relić served for two years as deputy mayor. On 22 May 2014, a new coalition led by the Serbian Progressive Party (SNS) came to power in Sombor, and, although the new governing coalition still included the Socialist Party, Relić was not personally included in the new administration.

He appeared in the tenth position on the Socialist Party's coalition list in the 2016 local elections and was not re-elected when the list won six seats. On 23 June 2016, he was appointed as a civilian member of the city committee on economy and privatization. He was not a candidate in the 2020 local elections.
