= Savo Sunajko =

Serbian doctor and politician

Savo Sunajko (Serbian Cyrillic: Саво Сунајко; born 1948) is a Serbian medical doctor and former politician. He served in the Vojvodina provincial assembly from 1993 to 1997 as a member of the far-right Serbian Radical Party (SRS).

== Private career ==
Sunajko is a physician with a specialization in pulmonary diseases. During his time in public life, he lived in Odžaci.

== Politician ==
=== Provincial representative (1993–1997) ===
Sunajko was elected to the Vojvodina assembly in the December 1992 provincial election, winning in Odžaci's first division. The governing Socialist Party of Serbia (SPS) won a plurality victory with 50 out of 120 seats, while the Radicals won six seats and initially provided support for the Socialist administration. After a split between the parties at the republic level, the Radicals moved into open opposition. Despite some challenges, the Socialists remained in power for the full four-year term.

Sunajko was also elected to the Odžaci municipal assembly in the December 1992 Serbian local elections, which took place concurrently with the provincial vote. The Socialists won a majority victory in the municipality with eighteen out of twenty-eight seats, while the Radicals finished second with seven. When the municipal assembly convened in late January 1993, Sunajko ran for assembly president, a position that was at the time equivalent to mayor. He was defeated by Socialist candidate Draga Pešić Zlatanović.

Sunajko was not re-elected in the 1996 Vojvodina provincial election, and available online sources do not indicate if he was a candidate.

=== Later candidacies ===
Sunajko later appeared in the twentieth position on the SRS's electoral list for the Odžaci municipal assembly in the 2008 Serbian local elections. Serbian local elections were by this time held under a system of proportional representation, and in the 2008 cycle all mandates were assigned to candidates on successful lists at the discretion of the sponsoring parties or coalitions, irrespective of numerical order. The Radicals won a plurality victory with thirteen out of twenty-eight seats in Odžaci and afterward formed government with Milan Ćuk as mayor. The administration later became dysfunctional in 2009 after the Socialists withdrew their support, and in August of that year the Serbian government appointed a provisional administration pending new elections in January 2010. Available online sources do not clarify if Sunajko served in the Odžaci assembly for the 2008–09 term.

The Radical Party experienced serious split at the republic level in late 2008, with several leading members leaving to join the more moderate Serbian Progressive Party (SNS). Sunajko remained with the Radicals and appeared in twenty-second position on the party's list in the 2010 local election. Weakened by the split, the party fell to only three seats. Sunajko did not serve afterward in the party's assembly delegation.

After a change to Serbia's electoral law in 2011, all mandates were awarded to candidates on successful lists in numerical order. Sunajko appeared in the twenty-third position on the Radical Party's list for Odžaci in the 2013 Serbian local elections. On this occasion, the party did not cross the electoral threshold to win assembly representation. He does not appear to have sought election to public office since this time.

== Electoral record ==
=== Provincial ===
December 1992 Vojvodina provincial election: Odžaci 1
| Candidate | Party | Votes | % |
|---|---|---|---|
| Savo Sunajko | Serbian Radical Party | | elected |
| Živko Nikolić | Democratic Movement of Serbia | | |
| Petar Tomić (incumbent) | Socialist Party of Serbia | | |
| Total | | | |
Source: Nikolić and Tomić are listed alphabetically.
