= Vojislav Denić =

Serbian politician (born 1959)

Vojislav Denić (Serbian Cyrillic: Војислав Денић; born 1959) is a Serbian former politician. He was the mayor of Lipljan in Kosovo from 1993 to 1996 and served in the Serbian parliament from 1994 to 1997. During his political career, Denić was a member of the Socialist Party of Serbia (SPS).

== Private career ==
Denić is a stomatologist.

== Politician ==
During the 1990s, Serbian political culture was dominated by the authoritarian rule of Slobodan Milošević, leader of the Socialist Party. In Kosovo, the majority Albanian community largely boycotted Serbian state institutions between 1990 and 1999.

Denić was elected to the Lipljan municipal assembly in the December 1992 Serbian local elections and was chosen afterward as assembly president, a position that was then equivalent to mayor.

He received the thirteenth position on the Socialist Party's electoral list for Priština in the 1993 Serbian parliamentary election. The list won a landslide victory with twenty-one out of twenty-four seats, and he was assigned a parliamentary mandate, taking his seat when the assembly convened in January 1994. (Between 1992 and 2000, one-third of the mandates in Serbian parliamentary elections were assigned to candidates on successful lists in numerical order, while the remaining two-thirds were assigned to other candidates at the discretion of the sponsoring parties or coalitions. Denić was not automatically elected by virtue of his list position but received a mandate all the same.) In the assembly, he served on the committee for health, demographic policy, and family. The Socialists won 123 out of 250 seats overall and gained a parliamentary majority through an alliance with the small New Democracy (ND) party. Denić served as a government supporter.

He was not a candidate in the 1997 Serbian parliamentary election, and his term in the republican assembly ended in that year.
