= Gordana Matijašević =

Serbian politician (born 1955)

Gordana Matijašević (Serbian Cyrillic: Гордана Матијашевић; born 1 December 1955) is a Serbian former politician and administrator. She was the deputy mayor of Voždovac from 1993 to 1994, served on the Belgrade city assembly from 2000 to 2004, and was briefly a member of the Serbian parliament in 2004. During her time as an elected official, Matijašević was a member of the Democratic Party of Serbia (DSS).

== Early life and career ==
Matijašević was born in Belgrade, in what was then the People's Republic of Serbia in the Federal People's Republic of Yugoslavia. She holds a Bachelor of Laws degree.

== Politician ==
=== The 1990s ===
Matijašević joined the DSS on its founding in 1992. The party was initially part of the Democratic Movement of Serbia (DEPOS), a coalition of parties opposed to the continued rule of Slobodan Milošević and the Socialist Party of Serbia (SPS).

DEPOS won a majority victory in Voždovac in the December 1992 Serbian local elections, taking thirty-one seats as against twenty-two for the SPS and two for the Democratic Party (DS). Matijašević was one of the DEPOS candidates elected; when the assembly convened in early 1993, she was chosen as its vice-president, a position that was then equivalent to deputy mayor.

The DSS left the DEPOS coalition in 1993 and contested that year's Serbian parliamentary election on its own. Matijašević appeared in the sixteenth position on the party's list for the Belgrade division and did not receive a mandate when the list won four seats. (From 1992 to 2000, Serbia's electoral law stipulated that one-third of parliamentary mandates would be assigned to candidates from successful lists in numerical order, while the remaining two-thirds would be distributed amongst other candidates at the discretion of the sponsoring parties. Matijašević could have been given a mandate despite her list position, but she was not.) She continued to serve as deputy mayor in this period. In June 1994, she was elected to the DSS's executive board.

In September 1994, six Voždovac assembly representatives who had been elected for DEPOS formed a new alliance with the Socialists. Simatković and Matijašević were controversially removed from office, and a new administration was established under Zoran Modrinić of the SPS. From 1995 to 1998, Matijašević was a director and advisor for the Vračar Business Area.

=== The 2000s ===
In 2000, the DSS joined a new multi-party coalition called the Democratic Opposition of Serbia (DOS). In the 2000 Yugoslavian presidential election, DOS candidate Vojislav Koštunica defeated Slobodan Milošević, who fell from power shortly thereafter. The DOS also won a landslide victory in Belgrade in the concurrent 2000 Serbian local elections, and Matijašević was elected to the city assembly as a DOS candidate. Perhaps unusually, she was elected for a constituency in New Belgrade rather than Voždovac; this notwithstanding, she was also elected to a new term in the Voždovac municipal assembly. This was the last local election cycle in Serbia in which candidates were elected for single-member constituencies; all subsequent local elections have been held under proportional representation.

In the aftermath of the DOS's landslide victory in Belgrade, Matijašević was appointed as director of the city market administration, overseeing the city's public markets.

Serbia's laws for parliamentary elections were changed in late 2000, such that the entire country became a single electoral unit and all mandates were awarded to candidates on successful lists at the discretion of the sponsoring parties or coalitions, irrespective of numerical order. Matijašević appeared in the seventieth position on the DSS's list in the 2003 Serbian parliamentary election and was not initially included in her party's assembly delegation after the list won fifty-three seats. She later received a mandate on 12 February 2004 as the replacement for another party delegate. Her term was brief; she resigned on 16 March 2004.

There were rumours the Matijašević would be the DSS's candidate for mayor of Belgrade in the 2004 Serbian local elections, but this did not happen. She instead appeared in the fourth position on the party's list for the Belgrade city assembly. The party won thirteen seats; although Matijašević had the right to take a mandate under Serbia's local election laws at the time, she appears to have declined the mandate before the assembly convened. She also appeared in the twenty-eighth position on the DSS's list for Voždovac and did not take a mandate when the party won ten seats.

After the 2004 Belgrade city election, Matijašević represented the DSS in negotiations on forming a new government. The DSS ultimately joined a coalition government led by the Democratic Party. In December 2004, Matajišević was appointed to a second term as director of the city market administration.

In the 2008 Serbian parliamentary election, Matijašević appeared in the thirty-fifth position on a combined electoral list of the DSS and New Serbia (NS). The list won thirty seats, and she did not receive a mandate.

She also appeared in the fourth position on the DSS–NS list for Belgrade in the 2008 Serbian local elections and again did not take a mandate when the list won twelve seats. The DS later formed a new city administration with the Socialist Party, and the DSS moved into opposition. Matijašević's tenure as director of the city market administration came to an end in October 2008.

In Voždovac, the new municipal administration that was formed after the 2008 elections fell apart in early 2009, and a new local election was held in June of that year. Matijašević appeared in the twenty-eighth position on a DSS–NS–People's Party (NP) coalition list and this time took a mandate after the list won seven seats. The election did not produce a clear winner, no government was formed, and the assembly was again dissolved for yet another local election in December. Matijašević appeared in the twenty-sixth position on the DSS–NS list and this time did not take a mandate when the list fell to six seats.

In October 2009, Matijašević was detained on suspicion of abusing her official position as director of the city market administration from 2006 to 2008, specifically by contracting out the maintenance of Belgrade markets to the Zvezdara utility company at inflated prices. It is not clear from available online accounts how the matter was resolved.

== Electoral record ==
=== Local (City Assembly of Belgrade) ===
2000 Belgrade City Election: New Belgrade Division 1
| Candidate | Party | Votes | % |
|---|---|---|---|
| Gordana Matijašević | Democratic Opposition of Serbia (Affiliation: Democratic Party of Serbia) | | elected |
| Milka Orlić | Natural Law Party | | |
| Radivoje Pejčić | Serbian Radical Party | | |
| Dr. Žarko Šešlija (incumbent) | Socialist Party of Serbia–Yugoslav Left (Affiliation: Socialist Party of Serbia) | | |
| Slobodan Zelenović | Serbian Renewal Movement | | |
| Total | | | |
Source: All candidates except Matijašević are listed alphabetically.

=== Local (Voždovac) ===
2000 Voždovac Municipal Election: Division 12
| Candidate | Party | Votes | % |
|---|---|---|---|
| Gordana Matijašević | Democratic Opposition of Serbia (Affiliation: Democratic Party of Serbia) | | elected |
| Vladimir Krstić | Serbian Radical Party | | |
| other candidates | | | |
| Total | | | |
