= Dragan Dimić (politician) =

Serbian politician (born 1950)

Dragan Dimić (Serbian Cyrillic: Драган Димић; born 1950) is a Serbian former politician. He served two terms in the Serbian parliament between 1993 and 2001 and was the mayor of Inđija from 1993 to 1994. During his time as a public official, Dimić was a member of the far-right Serbian Radical Party (SRS).

== Private career ==
Dimić is an engineer.

== Politician ==
=== Mayoral term and first parliamentary term ===
Dimić appeared in the eleventh position on the Radical Party's electoral list for the Novi Sad division in the 1992 Serbian parliamentary election. The list won ten seats, and he was chosen afterward for a parliamentary mandate, taking his seat when the assembly met in January 1993. (From 1992 to 2000, Serbia's electoral law stipulated that one-third of parliamentary mandates would be assigned to candidates from successful lists in numerical order, while the remaining two-thirds would be distributed amongst other candidates at the discretion of the sponsoring parties. Dimić's comparatively low position on his party's list did not prevent his election.)

The governing Socialists won the 1992 election but fell short of a majority with 101 seats out of 250. The Radicals finished in second place with seventy-three seats. While the SRS was technically in opposition for the parliament that followed, it initially worked with the Socialists in an informal alliance.

Dimić was also elected to the Inđija municipal assembly in the December 1992 Serbian local elections, which took place concurrently with that year's parliamentary vote. The Socialists won seventeen out of thirty-six seats in the assembly, while the Radicals won eight, and other parties and independents won eleven. The circumstances favoured a Socialist–Radical coalition, but the parties were unable to agree to terms. Somewhat unexpectedly, the Radicals instead formed government with the support of smaller parties, independents, and one renegade member of the Socialists. Dimić was chosen as assembly president, a position that was then equivalent to mayor. The Socialists strongly objected to this outcome and afterward sought to bring down the municipal government through a series of confidence votes.

Dimić's mayoral tenure took place during the Yugoslav Wars of the mid-1990s. Before and during his time in office, several members of the prominent Croat community in the village of Novi Slankamen (located in the Inđija municipality) left the area as refugees; in many cases, they were replaced by Serb refugees from Croatia. Croats who remained in the area reported that they often faced pressure and intimidation to leave. When journalists from Borba asked Dimić about the situation in April 1993, he declined to comment, saying only that he "[did] not want to make political statements, because he is the president of all citizens, and besides, Croats have not yet complained to him about any problems.”

The informal alliance of Socialists and Radicals in the republican parliament broke down in mid-1993, and a new parliamentary election took place in December of that year. Dimić received the ninth position on the Radical Party's list for Novi Sad. The party fell to seven seats in the division, and he was not, at the time, assigned a mandate for a second term. His first term ended when the new assembly met in January 1994.

The municipal government in Inđija became more unstable during 1994, and in October of that year the Serbian government dissolved the local government and appointed a provisional administration in its place. Dimić's tenure as mayor came to an end at this time.

=== Second parliamentary term ===
Dimić appeared in the second position on the Radical Party's list for the smaller, redistributed division of Sremska Mitrovica in the 1997 Serbian parliamentary election. The list won four seats; due to rounding, he was automatically elected. The Socialist Party's alliance won a plurality victory overall with 110 seats, while the Radicals finished second with eighty-two seats. In early 1998, the Socialists, Radicals, and Yugoslav Left (JUL) formed a new coalition government, and Dimić served in the assembly as a government supporter.

Serbia's longtime authoritarian leader and Socialist Party president Slobodan Milošević fell from power after losing the 2000 Yugoslavian presidential election, a watershed moment in Serbian politics. Dimić ran unsuccessfully as the Radical Party's candidate for Inđija–Ruma in the concurrent 2000 Vojvodina provincial election; he also ran in Inđija's tenth division in the 2000 Serbian local elections and, like all Radical Party candidates in the municipality for the cycle, was defeated.

Serbia's government fell after Milošević's defeat in the Yugoslavian election, and a transitional government excluding the Radicals came to power pending a new election later in the year. Prior to the vote, Serbia's electoral system was reformed such that the entire country became a single at-large electoral division and all mandates were assigned to candidates on successful lists at the discretion of the sponsoring parties or coalitions, irrespective of numerical order. Dimić received the seventy-sixth position on the Radical Party's list. The Radicals fell to twenty-three seats overall, and he was not chosen for a mandate. His parliamentary term ended when the new assembly met in January 2001.

== Electoral record ==
=== Provincial (Vojvodina) ===
2000 Vojvodina provincial election: Inđija–Ruma
Candidate	Party	Votes	%
Đorđe Misirkić	Democratic Opposition of Serbia (Affiliation: Democratic Party)		elected
Dragan Dimić	Serbian Radical Party		
other candidates			
Total			

=== Local (Inđija) ===
2000 Inđija municipal election: Division 10
Candidate	Party	Votes	%
Dragan Dimić	Serbian Radical Party		defeated
other candidates			
Total			
