= Živoslav Adamović =

Serbian engineer, academic, and politician

Živoslav Adamović (Serbian Cyrillic: Живослав Адамовић; born 14 April 1948) is a Serbian engineer, academic, and politician. He served in the Serbian parliament from 1991 to 1997 and was also the mayor of Smederevo in the 1990s. Adamović was a member of the Socialist Party of Serbia (SPS) during his time in parliament but later left the party.

== Private career ==
Adamović graduated from the University of Belgrade in 1972, received a master's degree in technical sciences from the University "Svetozar Marković" (now the University of Kragujevac) in 1980, and earned a PhD from the University of Belgrade in 1980. He is a prolific author in his field.

In October 2025, the stadium of the Mladi Radnik 1940 football club in Radinac named its stadium after Adamović (who had played for the team in his youth and was later its president for several years).

Adamović co-authored a monograph on the history of Smederevo's Želvoz railway vehicle repair factory in 2026.

== Politician ==
=== Socialist Party of Serbia ===
During the 1990s, Serbian politics was dominated by the authoritarian rule of Slobodan Milošević, leader of the Socialist Party of Serbia.

Adamović was elected for Smederevo's second division in the 1990 Serbian parliamentary election, the first to be held after Serbia's transition from a one-party socialist state to a (nominally) multi-party democracy. The Socialist Party won a landslide majority victory overall, and he served as a supporter of the administration.

Serbia adopted a system of proportional representation prior to the 1992 Serbian parliamentary election. Under the rules in effect at the time, the first one-third of assembly mandates were awarded to candidates on successful electoral lists in numerical order, while the remaining two-thirds were assigned to other candidates at the discretion of the sponsoring parties or coalitions. Adamović appeared in the third position on the Socialist Party's list for the Smederevo division and was automatically re-elected when the list won ten seats. The Socialists won a plurality victory overall and initially governed with unofficial support from the far-right Serbian Radical Party (SRS). In the assembly, Adamović served on the committee for science and technological development.

Adamović was also elected to the Smederevo municipal assembly in the December 1992 Serbian local elections, which took place concurrently with the parliamentary vote. The Socialists won a landslide majority in the municipal assembly with fifty-seven out of seventy seats. Adamović was chosen afterward as assembly president, a position that was then equivalent to mayor.

The Socialist–Radical alliance in the republican parliament broke down in mid-1993, and a new parliamentary election was held in December of that year. Adamović appeared in the fourth position on the Socialist Party's list for Smederevo and, due to rounding, was again re-elected when the list won eleven mandates. The Socialists won 123 out of 250 seats overall and established a parliamentary majority through an alliance with the small New Democracy (ND) party. Adamović again served on the science and technological development committee and was also a member of the education committee.

Adamović was succeeded as mayor of Smederevo after the 1996 Serbian local elections by Bojan Ilić, also a member of the Socialist Party. He was not a candidate in the 1997 Serbian parliamentary election, and his national assembly term ended that year.

=== Independent ===
Adamović later left the Socialist Party. He was re-elected to the Smederevo municipal assembly in the 2004 Serbian local elections as a candidate of the independent "Smederevo Union" list, which won three seats in total and afterward joined a local coalition government led by the Democratic Party (DS).

Serbia's electoral laws were reformed in 2011, such that all mandates in elections held under proportional representation were assigned to candidates on successful lists in numerical order. Adamović appeared in the second position on the "Coalition for a Better Smederevo" list in the 2012 Serbian local elections and was again elected to the city assembly when the list won six seats.

== Electoral record ==
=== National Assembly of Serbia ===
1990 Serbian parliamentary election: Smederevo II
Candidate	Party	First round		Second round	
Candidate	Party	Votes	%	Votes	%
Dr. Živoslav Adamović	Socialist Party of Serbia		44.76		elected
Radojica Jocić	Citizens' Group		22.96		defeated
Dragan Anđelković	Serbian Renewal Movement		defeated		
Velja Janković	Democratic Party (?)		defeated		
Slobodan Kostić	Serbian National Renewal		defeated		
Miroslav Tasić	Party of Independent Entrepreneurs "For P.I.S."		defeated		
Radule Trumbić	Democratic Party (?)		defeated		
Total					
Source: All candidates except Adamović and Jocić are listed alphabetically. Both Janković and Trumbić are listed in official documents as Democratic Party candidates. It is probable that one of them was actually a candidate of the Serb Democratic Party.
