= Vesko Pirić =

Serbian politician

Vesko Pirić (Serbian Cyrillic: Веско Пирић; born 6 May 1961) is a Serbian politician and administrator. He has served at different times as the mayor of Vitina, a member of the Serbian and Yugoslavian parliaments, and a member of the Serbian provisional executive council for Kosovo and Metohija. He is now based in Kragujevac. Pirić is a member of the Socialist Party of Serbia (SPS).

== Education and private career ==
Pirić is a graduate of the University of Belgrade Faculty of Political Sciences and also holds a master of laws degree. From 2007 to 2010, he was an independent expert associate of Kragujevac's privatization agency. He began working for Kragujevac's public health institute in 2010 and became the institute's public relations officer in 2012.

== Political career ==
=== Early years and first parliamentary term ===
Relations between Kosovo Serbs and Kosovo Albanians, never especially good, became extremely tense after the Serbian government reduced the province's autonomy in 1989. In Vitina, Pirić became the leader of a municipal committee organized by the Serb community with the stated purpose of self-defence against "separatists" in the Albanian community. In interview with Borba published in February 1990, Pirić said that local separatist elements were threatening the Serb and Montenegrin populations as well as Albanians who did not share their political views; he cited an instance in which Refik Ahmeti, the ethnically Albanian mayor of Vitina, was attacked and had a gun pulled on him. Throughout the 1990s, most Kosovo Albanians ultimately boycotted the Serbian state apparatus and took part in parallel governing institutions.

The Socialist Party dominated Serbian political life in the 1990s under the authoritarian leadership of Slobodan Milošević. Pirić was first elected to the Serbian parliament in a by-election for the constituency seat of Gnjilane and Vitina, which was held over two rounds in May and June 1992. The Socialists had won a landslide majority government in the previous 1990 Serbian parliamentary election, and Pirić served as a government supporter.

For the 1992 Serbian parliamentary election, held in December of that year, Serbia abandoned single-member constituency seats in favour of proportional representation. Pirić appeared in the seventh position on the SPS electoral list for the Leskovac division. The list won fifteen seats; notwithstanding his list position, he did not receive a seat in the new assembly. (From 1992 to 2000, Serbia's electoral law stipulated that one-third of parliamentary mandates would be assigned to candidates from successful lists in numerical order, while the remaining two-thirds would be distributed amongst other candidates at the discretion of the sponsoring parties. Pirić was not automatically elected and did not receive an "optional" mandate.) His first parliamentary term ended when the new assembly convened in January 1993. He was appointed as chair of the executive committee of the Vitina municipal assembly at around the same time and served in this role until late 1996.

=== Second parliamentary term and election as mayor ===
Pirić appeared in the sixth position on the Socialist Party's electoral list for Leskovac in the 1993 Serbian parliamentary election and, due to rounding, was automatically elected when the list won seventeen seats in the division. He took his seat when the new assembly convened in January 1994. Overall, the Socialists fell just short of a majority government with 123 out of 250 seats and afterward formed an administration with support from the small New Democracy (ND) party. In the assembly, Pirić was a member of the legislative committee and the committee for international relations. In a November 1994 assembly debate, he proposed the creation of a committee on Kosovo.

The Socialists won a landslide majority in Vitina in the 1996 Serbian local elections, taking thirty seats out of thirty-one. Pirić was among the SPS candidates elected, and he was subsequently chosen as president of the assembly, a position that was at the time equivalent to mayor.

The Socialist Party contested the 1997 Serbian parliamentary election in a coalition with New Democracy and the Yugoslav Left (JUL). Pirić appeared in the sixth position on the coalition's list for the smaller, redistributed division of Vranje. The list won five seats, and he did not receive a new mandate.

=== Kosovo War and after ===
The Kosovo War began in February 1998. In October of the same year, the Serbian government established a provisional executive council for Kosovo and Metohija. Pirić was included on the council as the minister of local self-government. In this capacity, he was responsible for organizing local security services. In February 1999, he said that such services had been successful in "detecting terrorist groups" and "help[ing] state security agencies in their efforts to expose these groups and prevent their further activities." He added that the formation of local security services was being done in accordance with the Milošević–Holbrooke agreement, reflecting the local population demographics of each community.

Serbia lost effective control over most of Kosovo following the NATO bombing of Yugoslavia, and many Serbs fled the province. In Vitina, United States Army Captain Matt McFarlane had effective oversight of the municipality in the immediate post-war period and sought to work with both Pirić and local Albanian leader Agron Hoxha, a former field commander of the Kosovo Liberation Army (KLA). Relations between Pirić and Hoxha were very poor, and there were several acts of violence between the local Serb and Albanian communities during this time.

Pirić served as acting president of the provisional executive council for Kosovo and Metohija from 1999 to 2000, although this appears to have been only a nominal position.

=== Fall of Milošević and after ===
Slobodan Milošević was defeated in the 2000 Yugoslavian presidential election and subsequently fell from power on 5 October 2000, a watershed moment in Serbian politics.

In the 2000 Yugoslavian parliamentary election, which took place concurrently with the presidential vote, Pirić appeared in the ninth position (out of nine) on a combined SPS–JUL electoral list for Yugoslavian parliament's Chamber of Citizens in the Vranje division. During the campaign, he called for the return of Serb refugees to Kosovo. The coalition won six seats in the division. For this election, half of the parliamentary mandates were assigned in numerical order and the other half at the discretion of the sponsoring parties; notwithstanding his list position, Pirić was on this occasion assigned an "optional" seat. Due to a delay in certifying the results for Vranje, his mandate was not certified until 3 November 2000. He served as an opposition member for the term that followed and chaired the committee for petitions, proposals, and appeals. His term ended in February 2003, when the Federal Republic of Yugoslavia was restructured as the State Union of Serbia and Montenegro.

Although Pirić encouraged Serbs to remain in Kosovo following the end of the military conflict, he himself sold his home shortly thereafter and relocated to Kragujevac in Central Serbia. The Serbian government recognized him as the legitimate mayor of Vitina until 2002.

Serbia's electoral laws were reformed after the fall of Milošević, such that the entire country became a single at-large electoral division and all mandates were awarded at the discretion of the sponsoring parties or coalitions, irrespective of numerical order. In the 2003 Serbian parliamentary election, Pirić appeared in the 183rd position out of 250 on the Socialist Party's list, which was mostly alphabetical. The Socialists won twenty-two seats, and he was not assigned a mandate.

=== Politics in Kragujevac ===
Serbia's electoral laws were again reformed in 2011, such that all mandates were awarded to candidates on successful lists in numerical order.

Pirić appeared on the Socialist Party's electoral lists for the Kragujevac city assembly in the 2020 and 2023 Serbian local elections, although in both instances his list position was too low for election to be a realistic prospect. He appeared in the twenty-ninth position in 2020 and was not elected when the list won nine seats. In 2023, he appeared in the twenty-first position and was not elected when the list fell to six seats.

== Electoral record ==
=== National Assembly of Serbia ===
31 May & 14 June 1992 Serbian parliamentary by-election: Gnjilane & Vitina
Candidate	Party	Votes	%
Vesko Pirić	Socialist Party of Serbia		elected
Miroslav Šolević	New Democracy–Movement for Serbia		
other candidates?			
Total			
