= Predrag Filipov =

Serbian politician

- Предраг Филипов

Republic of Serbia Ambassador to Slovenia
- In office 2007–2012
- Appointed by: Boris Tadić
- Preceded by: Ranko Milović
- Succeeded by: Aleksandar Radovanović

Federal Republic of Yugoslavia Ambassador to Japan
- In office 2001–2006
- Appointed by: Vojislav Koštunica
- Preceded by: Radoslav Bulajić
- Succeeded by: Ivan Mrkić

Personal details
- Born: 7 January 1956 (age 70) Zrenjanin, FPR Yugoslavia (now Serbia)
- Party: Democratic Party (1992–2013)
- Education: University of Novi Sad
- Occupation: Doctor; Politician

Predrag Filipov (Serbian: Предраг Филипов; born January 7, 1956) is a Serbian doctor, internal medicine specialist, doctor of medical sciences, politician and diplomat. He was a member of the Democratic Party. He is a former ambassador of Yugoslavia, i.e. Serbia and Montenegro in Japan and Ambassador of Serbia in Slovenia.

== Biography ==
Filipov was born on January 7, 1956, in Zrenjanin. He finished elementary school "Đura Daničić", high school "Jovan Jovanović Zmaj" and the Medical Faculty of the University of Novi Sad, where he graduated in 1982. After the obligatory medical internship, in 1984 he passed the professional exam for doctors. In the same year, he enrolled in postgraduate studies and went to serve his military service, where he graduated from the School of Reserve Officers of the Medical Service at the Military Medical Academy in Belgrade. In 1985, he was employed in the Department of Hematology and Hemostasis of the Department of Pathological Physiology of the Medical Faculty in Novi Sad. The following year, he began a specialization in internal medicine, and in 1990 he became a master of medical sciences. He passed the specialist exam in internal medicine in 1992. He enrolled in doctoral studies at the Medical Faculty in Novi Sad in 2008, and defended his doctoral dissertation in 2017. He is employed at the Clinical Center of Vojvodina in Novi Sad, at the Department of Thrombosis and Hemostasis of the Center for Laboratory Medicine.

== Political engagement ==
Filipov is a member of the Democratic Party since 1992. From March 1993 to March 1997, he was the president of the City Board of the Democratic Party in Novi Sad. From September 1997 to the end of 1999, he was the president of the Democratic Party Provincial Committee for Vojvodina, and from February 2000 to October 2001, he was the vice president of the Democratic Party. Acting as president of the Democratic Party City Board in Novi Sad, he introduced systematic work and party performance, adherence to adopted political action plans, and stabilized the party organization by maintaining constant communication with the membership and establishing a network of local party boarDemocratic Party. He introduced regular press conferences on local topics, and by establishing departmental committees with the idea of acting on the principles of "shadow government", he advocated for the preparation and selection of party personnel to perform functions in the government structure based on expertise. He is the initiator of the implementation of the "door to door" campaign of strategic election campaigns, designed on the basis of analysis of election results and public opinion polls. In addition to the numerical increase in the party's membership, he organized the education of members of election commissions for election control at the city, provincial and republic levels. Through regular planning of the performance of the committee group in the City Assembly, the interests of the citizens of Novi Sad were represented and the political positions of the Democratic Party City Board were promoted.

Filipov was one of the bearers of the idea of founding and organizing Provincial Committee of Democratic Party in Vojvodina. As the president of the provincial committee, he contributed to the finalization of the creation of the party organization in all 45 municipalities of Vojvodina and actively created the Democratic Party policy through public appearances and coordination of the work of the Democratic Party parliamentary group in the Assembly of the Autonomous Province of Vojvodina. He is one of the ideological authors of the pre-election declaration of Democratic Party in Vojvodina after the changes that were adopted at the Democratic Party Convention for Vojvodina on February 19, 2000, in Novi Sad and at the Democratic Party Assembly in Belgrade, on February 27, 2000. In the mentioned period, he was elected a member of the Assembly of the City of Novi Sad three times (1992, 1996 and 2000). From 1996 to 1999 he was the Vice President of the Assembly of the City of Novi Sad (in charge of social activities, social issues, health, education), and from June 1999 to October 2000 he was the President of the Executive Board of the Assembly of the City of Novi Sad. As a member of the City Assembly, he was a member or president of the Commission for Personnel, Administrative and Mandate-Immunity Issues, the Commission for Marking Holidays, Recognition and Intercity Cooperation in the Country and Abroad, the Management Board of the Health Center "Novi Sad", the Management Board of the Public Company ) "Sports and Business Center of Vojvodina" Novi Sad and the Board of Directors of the Public Enterprise Institute for Construction of the City of Novi Sad, and also a member of the Council of Local Communities on the territory of constituencies where he was elected councilor. Twice (in 1996 and 2000) he was elected a member of the Council of Citizens of the Federal Assembly of the FR of Yugoslavia, where he was a member of the Committee on Foreign Policy. He was elected a member of the Assembly of the Autonomous Province of Vojvodina in 2000. From October 2000 to January 2001, he performed the function of the Secretary for Health and Social Policy of the Executive Council of AP Vojvodina, and then until the end of 2001, the function of the Vice President of the Assembly of AP Vojvodina.

== Diplomatic career ==
Filipov was appointed Ambassador of the Federal Republic of Yugoslavia to Japan in November 2001, and served until June 2006. During this period, significant progress was made in the overall bilateral relations between Serbia and Japan, and the activities of the Honorary Consulate General of the Republic of Serbia in Osaka, whose jurisdiction includes the prefectures of the Kansai region, were renewed. At the same time, in addition to sending significant non-refundable aid, Japan also started placing direct investments in the Republic of Serbia. For his exceptional contribution to the establishment and improvement of bilateral and friendly relations with Japan in 2019, he was awarded the Order of the Rising Sun with a gold and silver star. He was the Ambassador of the Republic of Serbia to the Republic of Slovenia from the end of 2007 to April 2011. The period is characterized by the improvement and strengthening of the overall bilateral cooperation and resolving the biggest open issues that burdened the relations between the two countries, and in 2010, the Agreement on Social Security was signed. The progress of economic relations and trade was accompanied by the implementation of significant projects that contributed to the continuity of growth of total Slovenian investment activities in Serbia.

== Private life ==
Filipov is married with one child. He speaks English.

== Medals ==
- Order of the Rising Sun, 2nd Class, Gold and Silver Star.

== Literature ==
- Мојовић, Горица (2010). Србија и Демократска странка: хронологија 2010. Демократска странка. ISBN 978-86-7856-115-3.
Комшић, Јован. Програмска еволуција партија. У:
- Гоати, Владимир (2002). Партијска сцена Србије после 5. октобра 2000. Friedrich Ebert Stiftung. ISBN 86-7093-100-1.
