= Harun Hasani =

Serbian politician

Harun Hasani (Serbian Cyrillic: Харун Хасани; born 1940) is a Serbian dentist, cultural figure, and politician from the country's Gorani community. He is best known for compiling and editing Goranske narodne pesme (English: Gorani Folk Songs), the first published collection of Gorani poems.

He was nominated to the Serbian parliament in the 1970s and was the mayor of Gora in the 1990s.

== Early life and career ==
Hasani was born in the village of Bačka near the town of Dragaš, in what was then the Vardar Banovina of the Kingdom of Yugoslavia. He completed high school in Pirot and graduated from the Faculty of Dentistry in Belgrade. In 1965, he returned to his home region, which was by then part of the Autonomous Province of Kosovo and Metohija in the Socialist Republic of Serbia, Socialist Federal Republic of Yugoslavia. (The province was renamed as the Socialist Autonomous Province of Kosovo in 1968.)

Hasani ultimately became director of the health centre in Dragaš and was an associate of the Serbian Academy of Sciences in the GOS project (Gora, Opolje and Sredska). He has been credited with bringing healthcare to a relatively underdeveloped part of the country. In 1984, he was one of two individuals honoured by the Kosovo parliament for his work in the field of medicine.

== Cultural leader ==
After moving back to Dragaš, Hasani collected bibliographical material and folk tales of the Gorani community. In 1987, he published Goranske narodne pesme, which featured folk songs divided into various categories: Pečalbar songs, love songs, family songs, ritual songs, work songs, patriotic songs, lullabies, ballads, traditional songs, and humorous songs. In 1989, he was awarded the prestigious Vuk award for his publication of the work.

In late 2016, Hasani was awarded a lifetime achievement award from the Ivo Andrić international academy.

== Politician ==
In 1974 Serbian parliamentary election, Hasani was nominated by the electors of Belgrade to serve as a delegate in the Socio-Political Council, one of the three houses of the Serbian parliament. Given that there was only one approved electoral slate in this election, it is very probable that he was elected and served for the term that followed, from 1974 to 1978.

The leadership of Kosovo's Socialist Alliance of Working People (SSRN) met in February 1989 to nominate members of the presidency of the Socialist Autonomous Province of Kosovo. One SSRN representative, Vehbi Hajredini, objected to the absence of Turkish and ethnic Muslim candidates on the initial shortlist and proposed Hasani for one of the available roles. He did not ultimately appear on the list of approved candidates.

In January 1990, Hasani described the Gorani people as "hardworking, extremely honest people, devoted to this Yugoslavia, and great patriots." Later in the year, he said that relations between Gorani and Kosovo Albanians were worsening due to the political situation in Kosovo, remarking that there was no longer any shared cultural life between the communities.

Multi-party democracy was formally reintroduced to Serbia in 1990, and Hasani became a member of the Socialist Party of Serbia (SPS). In March 1991, he was appointed to a Serbian working group for cultural policy reform.

The Serbian government restructured the municipality of Dragaš in this period, dividing it into two sections and renaming the more populous area as Gora. Hasani served as the municipality's mayor after the May 1992 and December 1992 Serbian local elections. In April 1996, he was appointed to the Socialist Party's council for health issues.

== After 1999 ==
After the end of the Kosovo War in 1999, Hasani was removed from his position at the Dragaš/Gora health centre and ultimately fled the area, walking twelve hours on foot over mountainous terrain into the Republic of Macedonia. He subsequently relocated to Belgrade. It was later reported that his extensive library was destroyed by members of the Kosovo Liberation Army (KLA). In 2000, he was part of a delegation that met with Bratislava Morina, the Federal Republic of Yugoslavia's minister for refugees, displaced persons and humanitarian aid, about the ongoing situation in Gora.

Hasani appeared in the 245th position (out of 250) on the Socialist Party of Serbia's electoral list in the 2000 Serbian parliamentary election. For this election, all mandates were assigned to candidates on successful lists at the discretion of the sponsoring parties, irrespective of numerical order. The list won thirty-seven seats, and he was not assigned a mandate.

In 2001, Hasani participated in another delegation of Gorani representatives that met with Yugoslavian president Vojislav Koštunica. Two years later, he welcomed the appointed of Harri Holkeri as special representative of the United Nations Interim Administration Mission in Kosovo (UNMIK), arguing that it would improve the condition of the Gorani. He argued that Gorani farmers were experiencing cattle raids from Albanian rivals in this period and that many Gorani were considering fleeing the area.
