= Aleksandar Cvetković (politician) =

Serbian politician and administrator

Aleksandar P. Cvetković (Serbian Cyrillic: Александар П. Цветковић; born 7 January 1954) is a politician and administrator in Serbia. He was the mayor of Doljevac from 1993 to 2000, served in the assemblies of the Federal Republic of Yugoslavia and Serbia and Montenegro between 2000 and 2004, and was the commissioner of the Nišava District from 2009 to 2018. Cvetković is a member of the Socialist Party of Serbia (SPS).

== Early life and private career ==
Cvetković was born in the village of Pukovac in the municipality of Doljevac, in what was then the People's Republic of Serbia in the Federal People's Republic of Yugoslavia. He graduated from the high school of medicine in Niš in 1973, majoring as a dental technician, and earned a degree from the University of Skopje's Faculty of Dentistry in 1979. Cvetković began working at Medvedja's health centre in 1981 and transferred to Doljevac's centre in 1984; he became director of the latter institution in 1987 and held this position until 2001. In 1990, he completed his specialization in oral and dental diseases at the University of Niš Faculty of Medicine.

== Politician and administrator ==
Cvetković joined the Socialist Party in 1990 and became a member of the party's main board in 1992. He was chosen as mayor of Doljevac following the December 1992 Serbian local elections and was confirmed for another term in office after the 1996 local elections.

He appeared in the fifteenth position on the SPS's electoral list for the Niš constituency in the 1993 Serbian parliamentary election. The list won twelve seats, and he was not subsequently included in its assembly delegation. (From 1992 to 2000, Serbia's electoral law stipulated that one-third of parliamentary mandates would be assigned to candidates from successful lists in numerical order, while the remaining two-thirds would be distributed amongst other candidates on the lists by the sponsoring parties. It was common practice for the latter mandates to be awarded out of numerical order. Cvetković could have been awarded a mandate despite his relatively low position on the list, although in the event he was not.) He later appeared in the fifth position on the SPS's list for Prokuplje in the 1997 parliamentary election and was again not awarded a mandate when the list won two out of six seats for the division.

During the 1990s, the SPS dominated Serbia's political life under the authoritarian rule of Slobodan Milošević. Milošević was defeated by Vojislav Koštunica in the 2000 Yugoslavian presidential election, an event that prompted widespread changes in the political culture of Yugoslavia and Serbia. Cvetković was elected to the Chamber of Citizens in the concurrent Yugoslavian parliamentary election, receiving a mandate for the SPS in the Prokuplje division. The Democratic Opposition of Serbia (Demokratska opozicija Srbije, DOS) formed a coalition government with the Socialist People's Party of Montenegro (Socijalistička narodna partija Crne Gore, SNP) after the election, and Cvetković served as a member of the opposition.

The Federal Republic of Yugoslavia was reconstituted as the State Union of Serbia and Montenegro in early 2003, with a unicameral parliament whose first members were chosen by indirect election from the republican parliaments of Serbia and Montenegro. By virtue of its performance in the previous 2000 Serbian parliamentary election, the SPS had the right to appoint twelve members of the new body; Cvetković was selected as one of the party's delegates on 25 February 2003. His term came to an end in 2004, when a new assembly delegation was chosen following the 2003 Serbian parliamentary election.

Cvetković was appointed to the State Lottery of Serbia in 2005 and held this role for the next two years. He appeared in the 238th position on the SPS's electoral list for the 2008 Serbian parliamentary election and was not afterwards given a mandate when the list won twenty seats. (The entire country was by this stage counted as a single electoral division. From 2000 to 2011, all mandates in Serbian parliamentary elections were distributed to candidates on successful lists at the discretion of the sponsoring parties or coalitions, irrespective of numerical order. Cvetković's position on the list, which was mostly alphabetical, had no specific bearing on his chances of election.)

He was appointed as commissioner of the Nišava District in January 2009 and held the position until January 2018. In 2010, he coordinated strategic planning sessions for flood prevention in the region. He attended a prominent memorial service for victims of the 1999 NATO bombing of Yugoslavia in Niš in May 2017.

Serbia's electoral laws were again reformed in 2011, such that all mandates in parliamentary elections were awarded to candidates on successful lists in numerical order. Cvektović appeared on the ninety-seventh position on the SPS list in the 2016 Serbian parliamentary election; this was too low for election to be a realistic prospect, and he was indeed not elected when the list won twenty-nine seats.

After standing down as commissioner for Nišava, Cvetković worked as an advisor to Serbian minister of foreign affairs Ivica Dačić and received a position at Serbia's embassy in Tirana, Albania.
