= Ibro Vait =

Serbian academic and former politician (born 1950)

Ibro Vait (Serbian Cyrillic: Ибро Ваит; born 5 December 1950) is Serbian academic and former politician from the country's Gorani community. He was a member of the Serbian parliament from 1994 to 2001 and held high municipal office in Gora. He is probably best known for being part of Serbia's delegation to the 1999 Rambouillet conference. During his political career, Vait was a member of the Socialist Party of Serbia (SPS).

== Early life and private career ==
Vait was born in the village of Globočica in the municipality of Dragaš, in what was then the Autonomous Region of Kosovo and Metohija in the People's Republic of Serbia, Federal People's Republic of Yugoslavia. He received a bachelor's degree (1975) and a master's degree (1996) from the University of Priština, and in 2005 he earned a PhD from the Faculty of Philosophy, University of East Sarajevo. He taught mathematics at the Faculty of Education in Prizren prior to the Kosovo War and subsequently worked at the relocated faculty in Leposavić.

== Politician ==
During the 1990s, Serbian political life was dominated by the authoritarian rule of Slobodan Milošević, leader of the Socialist Party of Serbia. In Kosovo, most of the province's majority Albanian community boycotted Serbian government and state institutions between 1990 and 1999.

In 1992, the Serbian government established the municipality of Gora, covering the town of Dragaš and the surrounding area. Vait was appointed as president of the municipal assembly's executive committee in July 1993, effectively making him the first minister of the local government.

Vait appeared in the fifteenth position on the Socialist Party's electoral list for the Priština division in the 1993 Serbian parliamentary election. The Socialists won a landslide victory in the division with twenty-one out of twenty-four mandates; he was included in the party's delegation, taking his seat when the assembly met in January 1994. (Between 1992 and 2000, one-third of the mandates in Serbian parliamentary elections were assigned to candidates on successful lists in numerical order, while the remaining two-thirds were assigned to other candidates at the discretion of the sponsoring parties or coalitions. Vait was not automatically elected by virtue of his list position but received a mandate all the same.) The Socialists won a strong plurality victory overall and established a parliamentary majority with support from the small New Democracy (ND) party. In the assembly, Vait was a member of the committee on international relations. In June 1997, he was part of a group of parliamentarians who proposed a significant increase in the flow of personal income tax to municipal expenditures.

The Socialist Party contested the 1997 Serbian parliamentary election in an alliance with New Democracy and the Yugoslav Left (JUL). Vait appeared in the fourth position on the alliance's list for the redistributed Peć constituency and was re-elected when the list won twelve out of fourteen seats. The Socialist Party's alliance won a reduced plurality victory overall, and the SPS and JUL afterward formed a new coalition government with the far-right Serbian Radical Party (SRS).

On 10 April 1998, in the early period of the Kosovo War, Socialist Party official Gugna Adem was seriously wounded in an ambush attack near Štimlje–Suva Reka. Vait, who was in the same car as Adem, was not hurt; Serbian media described the attackers as wearing insignia of the Army of the Republic of Albania. In a parliamentary speech later in the year, Vait said that Serbia's Albanian national minority had been "poisoned for decades by separatism" and that Serbia had an obligation to defend all its citizens from such an ideology.

Vait was appointed as one of seventeen members of Serbia's provisional executive council for Kosovo and Metohija in early October 1998, with particular responsibility for international relations. Given the ongoing conflict in Kosovo, the council's powers were limited. The following month, while discussing a negotiated settlement for Kosovo, Vait made the following statement: "We, the Gorani, propose that the first elections in Kosovo be held with the presence of and according to OSCE rules. However, there are no conditions for elections until a population census is conducted. All national communities are struggling with data that is mainly based on their own estimates, and not on the basis of an accurately determined census by world standards."

In February 1999, Vait was appointed as a delegate to the Rambouillet conference, representing Kosovo's Gorani community. The conference ultimately failed to end the Kosovo War via diplomatic means, and its failure resulted in the NATO bombing of Yugoslavia. Serbia lost control over most of Kosovo, including Gora, at the conclusion of the conflict; like many others, Vait was forced to leave the area.

Late in his parliamentary term, Vait served as president of the National Community of Gorani in Serbia. In May 2000, he issued a protest against reports that the United Nations Interim Administration Mission in Kosovo (UNMIK) was planning to identify Gorani people as Bosniaks in an upcoming census. Vait contended that the Gorani language has its roots in Serbian and that the Gorani people have no historical connection to the Bosniak community.

Slobodan Milošević fell from power on 5 October 2000, and the Socialist Party ceased to be the dominant party in Serbia after this time. Vait was not a candidate in the 2000 Serbian parliamentary election, and his term ended when the new assembly convened in January 2001. In February 2001, he took part in a delegation of Gorani community leaders who met with Vojislav Koštunica, Milošević's successor as president of the Federal Republic of Yugoslavia, to discuss the status of the community.

Vait appeared in the eighty-fourth position on the Socialist Party's electoral list in the 2003 Serbian parliamentary election. By this time, Serbia's electoral laws had been reformed so that the entire country was a single at-large electoral division and all mandates were assigned to candidates on successful lists at the discretion of the sponsoring parties or coalitions, irrespective of numerical order. The Socialists won twenty-two seats, and Vait was not given a mandate for a new term.
