= May 1992 Yugoslavian parliamentary election =

Parliamentary elections were held in Federal Republic of Yugoslavia on 31 May 1992. The elections were boycotted by almost all opposition parties in protest at both how the electoral law had been passed, and the unequal access to finance and the media given to the governing and opposition parties. Independent Milan Panić became federal Prime Minister. Following mass protests, Panić and federal President Dobrica Ćosić agreed to hold new elections in December under a new electoral system.

== Results ==
Party	Votes	%	Seats		
Party	Votes	%	Proportional	Constituency	Total
Serbia
Socialist Party of Serbia	1,655,485	49.05	31	42	73
Serbian Radical Party	1,166,933	34.57	23	7	30
Democratic Fellowship of Vojvodina Hungarians	106,831	3.17	0	2	2
Other parties and independents	445,858	13.21	0	1	1
Total	3,375,107	100.00	54	52	106
Valid votes	3,375,107	88.26			
Invalid/blank votes	448,789	11.74			
Total votes	3,823,896	100.00			
Registered voters/turnout	6,848,247	55.84			
Montenegro
Democratic Party of Socialists of Montenegro	160,040	68.59	19	4	23
Serbian Radical Party	22,256	9.54	3	0	3
League of Communists – Movement for Yugoslavia	14,205	6.09	2	0	2
Other parties	27,266	11.68	0	0	0
Independents	9,578	4.10	0	2	2
Total	233,345	100.00	24	6	30
Valid votes	233,345	94.90			
Invalid/blank votes	12,553	5.10			
Total votes	245,898	100.00			
Registered voters/turnout	433,363	56.74			
Source: Nohlen & Stöver, Goati, Federal Electoral Commission
