= League of Communists – Movement for Yugoslavia =

Political party in Serbia

League of Communists – Movement for Yugoslavia Савез комуниста - Покрет за Југославију Savez komunista - Pokret za Jugoslaviju Zveza komunistov — Gibanje za Jugoslavijo Сојуз на комунистите — Движење за Југославија
- Abbreviation: СK-ПЈ / SК-PJ / ZK-GJ / СК-ДЈ
- Founded: 4 November 1990
- Dissolved: 23 July 1994
- Preceded by: League of Communists Organisation in the Yugoslav People's Army
- Succeeded by: Yugoslav Left
- Headquarters: Belgrade, Serbia, FR Yugoslavia (SFR Yugoslavia)
- Ideology: Communism; Marxism–Leninism; Yugoslavism
- Political position: Far-left
- Colours: Red
- Slogan: "Workers of the world, unite!"
- Anthem: "The Internationale"

Party flag

League of Communists – Movement for Yugoslavia (Serbian Cyrillic: Савез комуниста - Покрет за Југославију, romanized: Savez komunista - Pokret za Jugoslaviju; abbr. СК-ПЈ, SK-PJ) was a political party formed by members of the Yugoslav People's Army in 1990 active in Serbia. The party was based on former party organizations within the army. In 1994 it joined the Yugoslav Left party led by Mirjana Marković.

The party was formed on 4 November 1990 at Belgrade's Sava Centar.

== Members ==
Members included:

- Veljko Kadijević
- Branko Mamula
- Nikola Ljubičić
- Lazar Mojsov
- Stevan Mirković
- Petar Gračanin
- Mirjana Marković
- Aleksandar Vulin

== See also ==
- League of Communists of Yugoslavia in Serbia
