= János Bozsóki =

Serbian politician

János Bozsóki (Serbian: Јанош Божоки, Janoš Božoki; born 12 July 1942) is a Serbian former politician from the country's Hungarian community. He was a member of the Vojvodina provincial assembly from 1992 to 2000 and has held high municipal office in Ada. At different times in his political career, he was a member of the Democratic Fellowship of Vojvodina Hungarians (VMDK), the Alliance of Vojvodina Hungarians (VMSZ), and the Vojvodina Hungarian Christian Democratic Movement (VMKDM).

== Early life and career ==
Bozsóki was born in Ada, which had been annexed to Hungary the previous year during the Hungarian occupation of Yugoslavia in World War II. He was raised in the community, which was returned to Yugoslavia at the end of the war, and trained as a locksmith. He worked at the Potisje Machine Tool Factory and was trade union president in the factory from 1988 to 1992.

== Politician ==
When multi-party politics was re-introduced to Serbia in 1990, Bozsóki became a member of initiation committee of the Union of Reform Forces of Yugoslavia (SRSJ) in Ada. During this period, the political culture of Serbia was dominated by the Socialist Party of Serbia (SPS) and its authoritarian leader, Slobodan Milošević.

Bozsóki helped to lead a local protest against the Croatian War in November 1991 and sought to organize a local referendum on both the war and the return of conscripted soldiers from the combat zone.

=== Democratic Fellowship of Vojvodina Hungarians ===
By 1992, Bozsóki was a member of the Democratic Fellowship of Vojvodina Hungarians.

Most opposition parties boycotted the May 1992 Vojvodina provincial election on the grounds that conditions for a fair vote did not exist; the VMDK chose to participate to prevent the Socialists from winning by default in predominantly Hungarian areas. Bozsóki was elected for the Ada division, defeating his Socialist opponent by a significant margin. The Socialists won a landslide majority victory overall, and the VMDK delegates served in opposition.

Bozsóki was also elected to the Ada municipal assembly in the concurrent May 1992 Serbian local elections. The VMDK won a majority victory in the municipality with sixteen seats out of twenty-five, and on 9 July 1992 Bozsóki was chosen as chair of the assembly's executive council. Later in the year, he opposed efforts by Belgrade authorities to relocate new refugees from the ongoing wars in Croatia and Bosnia to Ada, arguing that the municipality did not have the financial resources to accommodate them.

The opposition boycott of the May 1992 elections left ongoing doubts as to the legitimacy of the results, and new elections were ultimately called for December 1992. Bozsóki was re-elected for Ada in the December 1992 provincial election, in which the Socialists lost their majority but still won the greatest number of seats. While the Socialists did not have a stable majority for the term that followed, they nonetheless managed to retain power for the next four years, while the VMDK remained in opposition.

The VMDK won an increased majority in Ada in the December 1992 Serbian local elections, and Bozsóki was confirmed for a second term as executive council president in January 1993.

Bozsóki later appeared in the fourteenth position on the VMDK's electoral list for the Novi Sad division in the 1993 Serbian parliamentary election. The party did not win any seats in the division.

=== Alliance of Vojvodina Hungarians ===
The VMDK experienced a serious split in 1994, and several leading members joined the breakaway Alliance of Vojvodina Hungarians. Bozsóki became a founding member of the new party, which soon replaced the VMDK as the leading Hungarian party in Ada.

Bozsóki was re-elected to the provincial assembly for Ada as a VMSZ candidate in the 1996 provincial election, in which the Socialists regained their majority status in the provincial assembly. He continued to serve as a member of the opposition for the term that followed. In the concurrent 1996 Serbian local elections, independent candidates won a majority of seats in Ada, and Bozsóki was personally defeated in his bid for re-election to the local assembly.

=== Vojvodina Hungarian Christian Democratic Movement ===
Bozsóki later left the VMSZ and joined a smaller party called the Vojvodina Hungarian Christian Democratic Movement in 2000. In the 2000 Vojvodina provincial election, he was defeated in the second round by VMSZ candidate István Nacsa. He was also defeated in his bid to return to the local assembly in the 2000 Serbian local elections – again by Nacsa, who in this instance ran as the candidate of a local VMSZ-led coalition. He does not appear to have returned to political life after this time.

== Electoral record ==
=== Provincial (Vojvodina) ===
2000 Vojvodina provincial election: Ada
Candidate	Party	First round		Second round	
Candidate	Party	Votes	%	Votes	%
István Nacsa	Alliance of Vojvodina Hungarians	2,407			elected
András Balog	Citizens' Group (?)	2,068			defeated
János Bozsóki (incumbent)	Vojvodina Hungarian Christian Democratic Movement	1,765			defeated
other candidates?					
Total					

1996 Vojvodina provincial election: Ada (Second Round)
Candidate	Party	Votes	%
János Bozsóki (incumbent)	Alliance of Vojvodina Hungarians		elected
Ferenc Deli	Yugoslav Left		
János Jasztrebinác	Citizens' Group		
Total			
Source: Deli and Jasztrebinác are listed alphabetically.

December 1992 Vojvodina provincial election: Ada
Candidate	Party	Votes	%
János Bozsóki (incumbent)	Democratic Fellowship of Vojvodina Hungarians		elected
Ljubica Rakić	Socialist Party of Serbia		
Vébel Vera Tatić	Citizens' Group		
Total			
Source: Rakić and Tatić are listed alphabetically.

May 1992 Vojvodina provincial election: Ada
Candidate	Party	Votes	%
János Bozsóki	Democratic Fellowship of Vojvodina Hungarians	7,076	elected in the first round
Aleksandar Grčki	Socialist Party of Serbia	2,249	
other candidates?			
Total			

=== Local (Ada) ===
2000 Ada municipal election: Division 13
Candidate	Party	Votes	%
István Nacsa	Alliance of Vojvodina Hungarians–Civic Movement of Vojvodina Hungarians– Democratic Fellowship of Vojvodina Hungarians–Democratic Party (Affiliation: Alliance of Vojvodina Hungarians)		elected
János Bozsóki	Vojvodina Hungarian Christian Democratic Movement		
other candidates?			
Total			

1996 Ada municipal election: Division 13
Candidate	Party	Votes	%
András Balog	Citizens' Group		elected in the second round
János Bozsóki	Alliance of Vojvodina Hungarians		defeated in the second round
Péter Döme	Zajedno (Coalition Together)		defeated in the first round
Total			
