= Đorđe Božić =

Serbian politician (born 1955)

Đorđe Božić (Serbian Cyrillic: Ђорђе Божић; born 1955) is a Serbian former politician. He served in the Serbian parliament and the Vojvodina provincial assembly and was the mayor of Stara Pazova in the 1990s. During his political career, Božić was a member of the Socialist Party of Serbia (SPS).

== Early life and career ==
Božić was born in the village of Belegiš in Vojvodina, in what was then the People's Republic of Serbia in the Federal People's Republic of Yugoslavia. He is a graduated agricultural engineer.

== Politician ==
Božić was elected to the Serbian national assembly for Stara Pazova's first division in the 1990 Serbian parliamentary election, winning in the first round of voting. He took his seat when the assembly convened in early 1991. The Socialists won a majority victory overall, and Božić served as a supporter of the administration. He was also elected to the Stara Pazova municipal assembly in the May 1992 Serbian local elections and was chosen afterward as assembly president, a position that was then equivalent to mayor.

Božić's parliamentary term coincided with the beginning of the Yugoslav Wars of the 1990s. In October 1992, he was one of a number of parliamentarians who introduced motions in the national assembly, contending that their municipalities could not handle the massive influx of refugees from areas affected by the conflict. Božić contended that Stara Pazova had taken in thirteen thousand refugees, many of them younger students, and that the municipality's existing revenues could not handle the demand for new school equipment, transportation and accommodation, and additional textbooks. He spoke against a proposed new Law on Public Expenditures, arguing that it would simply make the situation worse.

Serbia's electoral laws were reformed prior to the 1992 Serbian parliamentary election: the country was divided into nine divisions, each with multiple members elected via proportional representation. One-third of the assembly mandates were assigned to candidates on successful lists in numerical order, while the remaining two-thirds were assigned to other candidates on the lists at the discretion of the sponsoring parties or coalitions. Božić appeared in the fourteenth position on the Socialist Party's list for the Novi Sad division and was not assigned a new mandate after the list won nine seats. His term ended when the new assembly convened in January 1993.

The Socialists won a narrow victory over the far-right Serbian Radical Party (SRS) in Stara Pazova in the December 1992 Serbian local elections. Neither side commanded a majority of seats in the assembly, and in early 1993 Božić was succeeded as mayor by Dobrivoje Stevelić, an independent representative who became assembly president with the support of the Socialists.

Božić was later elected to the Vojvodina provincial assembly for Stara Pazova's third division in the 1996 Vojvodina provincial election and took his seat when the assembly convened in early 1997. The Socialists won a majority victory, and he again served as a government supporter. He was not re-elected in the 2000 provincial election; available online sources do not indicate if he was a candidate.

An individual named Đorđe Božić later served as president of the Srem District Chamber of Commerce, although it is not confirmed if this is the same person.

== Electoral record ==
=== Provincial (Vojvodina) ===
1996 Vojvodina provincial election: Stara Pazova Division 3
Candidate	Party	Votes	%
Đorđe Božić	Socialist Party of Serbia		elected
other candidates			
Total			

=== National Assembly of Serbia ===
1990 Serbian parliamentary election: Stara Pazova Division 1
Candidate	Party	Votes	%
Đorđe Božić	Socialist Party of Serbia		53.64
Stana Čulić	Citizens' Group		defeated
Srbislav Knežević	Serbian National Renewal		defeated
Jovan Milanović	Serb Democratic Party		defeated
Jovan Miljković	Party of National Accord		defeated
Ljubiša Obradović	Serbian Renewal Movement		defeated
Stanimir Radovanović	Citizens' Group		defeated
Petar Veličković	Workers' Party of Yugoslavia		defeated
Total			
Source: All candidates except Božić are listed alphabetically.
