= Novica Pavlović =

Serbian politician

Novica Pavlović (Serbian Cyrillic: Новица Павловић; born 1939 or 1940) is a former Serbian politician. He was a member of the Vojvodina provincial assembly from 1992 to 1997 and led the executive committee of the Zrenjanin city assembly from 1992 to 1996. During his time as an elected official, Pavlović was a member of the Socialist Party of Serbia (SPS).

== Private career ==
Pavlović is a graduated economist.

== Politician ==
Pavlović was elected to the Vojvodina assembly in the May 1992 provincial election, winning Zrenjanin's seventh division in the second round of voting. The Socialists won a landslide majority victory in this election, due in part to a boycott by Serbia's leading democratic opposition parties, and Pavlović served as a government supporter.

He was also elected to the Zrenjanin city assembly in the May 1992 Serbian local elections, which were held concurrently with the provincial vote. The Socialists won a majority victory in the city, again due in part to the opposition boycott. When the assembly convened on 25 June 1992, Pavlović was chosen as president of its executive committee.

Due to concerns about the legitimacy of the May 1992 votes, new provincial and local elections were held in December 1992. Pavlović was re-elected to the provincial assembly, again for Zrenjanin's seventh division. The Socialists won the greatest number of seats in the provincial assembly but fell below majority status; the party nonetheless managed to remain in power for the next four years, and Pavlović again served as a supporter of the administration.

The Socialists won a reduced majority at the local level in Zrenjanin in December 1992. Pavlović was re-elected to the city assembly and was appointed to a second term as president of the executive committee on 15 January 1993. Shortly after his appointment, he blamed fuel shortages in Zrenjanin on corruption and mismanagement at the regional level in the Central Banat District. He ultimately served for the entire term.

Pavlović was defeated in his bid for re-election to the Zrenjanin city assembly in 1996. He was also not re-elected to the provincial assembly, and his term ended when the new assembly convened in early 1997; available online sources do not specify if he was a candidate at the provincial level.

== Electoral record ==
=== Provincial (Vojvodina) ===
December 1992 Vojvodina provincial election: Zrenjanin Division 7
Candidate	Party	Votes	%
Novica Pavlović (incumbent)	Socialist Party of Serbia		elected
Slobodan Bursać	Serb Democratic Party		
Radoslava Ikonov	Democratic Coalition		
Mile Lovre	Serbian Radical Party		
Miloš Mirkov	People's Party		
Total			
Source: All candidates except Pavlović are listed alphabetically.

May 1992 Vojvodina provincial election: Zrenjanin Division 7 (Second Round)
Candidate	Party	Votes	%
Novica Pavlović	Socialist Party of Serbia		elected
Momčilo Dragić	Citizens' Group		
Total			
