= Živodarka Dacin =

Serbian medical doctor and politician (born 1954)

Živodarka Dacin (Serbian Cyrillic: Живодарка Дацин; born 20 April 1954) is a Serbian medical doctor and former politician. She was a member of the Serbian parliament from 2001 to 2007 and briefly served as mayor of Kikinda in 1996. During her time as an elected official, Dacin was a member of the Socialist Party of Serbia (SPS).

== Private career ==
Dacin is a specialist medical biochemist and has a master's degree in pharmaceutical medicine. She has worked at the Clinical Center in Kikinda and served as president of the city's local Red Cross organization.

== Politician ==
=== Local politics in Kikinda ===
The Socialist Party dominated Serbia's political landscape in the 1990s under the leadership of Slobodan Milošević, the country's authoritarian president. The SPS won a landslide majority victory in Kikinda in the May 1992 Serbian local elections, due in part to a boycott by several leading opposition parties. When the municipal assembly convened on 29 June 1992, Rajko Matović was chosen as mayor and Dacin as deputy mayor.

The May 1992 elections were widely seen as lacking legitimacy due to the opposition boycott, and a new round of local elections was called for December 1992. Although the Socialists once again won a landslide victory in Kikinda, Matović was personally defeated in his for re-election. When the new assembly met on 18 January 1993, Rajko Popović was chosen as mayor. Dacin was re-elected to the assembly, but available online sources do not confirm if she continued to serve as deputy mayor after this time.

The Socialist Party's local branch in Kikinda was badly divided during these years. Popović was ultimately dismissed as mayor on July 30 1996 following a mutiny among the party's delegates, and Dacin was chosen as his successor. Her term was brief. The Socialists were defeated in the 1996 local elections in Kikinda, falling to only nine seats out of fifty-one. Paja Francuski of the League of Social Democrats of Vojvodina (LSV) became the municipality's new mayor in December of the same year.

Dacin ran as the Socialist Party's candidate for Kikinda's fourth division in the 1996 and the 2000 Vojvodina provincial elections and was defeated both times. SPS leader Slobodan Milošević was defeated in the 2000 Yugoslavian presidential election, which took place concurrently with the provincial vote, and subsequently fell from power on 5 October 2000. This was a watershed moment in Serbian politics, resulting in the Socialist Party's fall from its previous position of dominance.

=== Parliamentarian ===
The Serbian government fell after Milošević's defeat in the Yugoslavian election, and a new Serbian parliamentary election was held in December 2000. Serbia's electoral laws were reformed prior to the vote, such that the entire country became a single electoral division and all mandates were assigned to candidates on successful electoral lists at the discretion of the sponsoring parties or coalitions, irrespective of numerical order. Dacin received the thirty-eighth position on the SPS's list, which was mostly alphabetical, and was assigned a mandate after the list won thirty-seven seats. His term began when the assembly convened in January 2001. The Democratic Opposition of Serbia (DOS) coalition won a landslide victory with 176 out of 250 seats, and the Socialists served in opposition for the term that followed. Notwithstanding this, Dacin was chair of the health and family committee.

Dacin appeared in the fifty-eighth position on the SPS list in the 2003 parliamentary election and was given a mandate for a second term after the list won twenty-two seats. The Democratic Party of Serbia (DSS) emerged as the dominant party in Serbia's coalition government after the election. While the Socialists were not included in the new administration, they provided vital confidence support in the assembly. In this term, Dacin was deputy chair of the committee on gender equality and a member of the health and family committee. In July 2005, she was appointed to lead a special committee investigating allegations of stolen babies from Serbian hospitals between 1969 and 2001. The committee's report determined that the concerns of parents were credible and that all reports of missing children should be handled by a special prosecutor and the Special Department of the District Court for the Fight against Organized Crime. Dacin also chaired a parliamentary subcommittee on the rights of the child in this period.

Dacin was also re-elected to the Kikinda municipal assembly in the 2004 Serbian local elections. The Socialists won three seats in the assembly and afterward took part in a coalition government led by the far-right Serbian Radical Party (SRS). Dacin served as a supporter of the local administration.

In the 2007 parliamentary election, Dacin appeared in the twenty-fourth position on the SPS's list. The list won sixteen seats, and she was not given a mandate for a third term. She was later given the sixtieth position on the party's list in the 2008 parliamentary election and was again not assigned a mandate when the list won twenty seats.

Dacin appeared in the ninth position on the Socialist Party's list in the 2008 Vojvodina provincial election and was not given a mandate when the party won three proportional seats. She also appeared in third position on the SPS's list for Kikinda in the 2008 Serbian local elections and not did not take a mandate when this list, as well, won three seats. Both of these elections took place concurrently with the parliamentary vote.

She does not appear to have sought a return to politics since this time.

== Electoral record ==
=== Provincial (Vojvodina) ===
2000 Vojvodina provincial election: Kikinda Division 4 (Second Round)
Candidate	Party	Votes	%
Dragomir Pudar	Democratic Opposition of Serbia (Affiliation: Democratic Party of Serbia)		elected
Branislav Blažić (incumbent)	Serbian Radical Party		
Živodarka Dacin	Socialist Party of Serbia–Yugoslav Left (Affiliation: Socialist Party of Serbia)		
Total			
Source: Blažić and Dacin are listed alphabetically.

1996 Vojvodina provincial election: Kikinda 4 (Second Round)
Candidate	Party	Votes	%
Branislav Blažić	Serbian Radical Party		elected
Živodarka Dacin	Socialist Party of Serbia		
Stevan Popov (incumbent)	Zajedno (Coalition Together) (Affiliation: Democratic Party)		
Total			
Source: Dacin and Popov are listed alphabetically.
