= Károly Pál =

Serbian politician

Károly Pál (Serbian Cyrillic: Карољ Пал, romanized: Karolj Pal; born 13 January 1951) is a Serbian politician from the country's Hungarian community. He has served in the Serbian parliament and the Vojvodina provincial assembly and has been the mayor of Mali Iđoš. For most of his political career, Pál has been a member of the Alliance of Vojvodina Hungarians (VMSZ).

== Private career ==
Pál is an economist from the village of Feketić in Mali Iđoš, Vojvodina.

== Politician ==
=== At the republic and provincial levels ===
Pál ran for the Serbian national assembly in the 1990 parliamentary election in the division of Bačka Topola and Mali Iđoš, with endorsements from the Union of Reform Forces of Yugoslavia (SRSJ) in Vojvodina, the Association for the Yugoslav Democratic Initiative (UJDI), and the League of Social Democrats – Yugoslavia. He was defeated Sándor Nagy of the Democratic Fellowship of Vojvodina Hungarians (VMDK).

He was elected to the Vojvodina assembly for the Mali Iđoš division in the May 1992 provincial election as an independent candidate. Although he was a member of the Reform Democratic Party of Vojvodina (RDSV) by this time, the party boycotted the election and he could not appear on the ballot with its endorsement. He was re-elected in the December 1992 provincial election with a dual endorsement from the RDSV and the VMDK. The Socialist Party of Serbia (SPS) won both elections, and Pál served as a member of the opposition during his time in the provincial assembly. He joined the VMSZ when the party was formed in 1994 and was not a candidate in the 1996 provincial election.

Pál appeared in the fourth position on the VMSZ's electoral list for Subotica in the 1997 Serbian parliamentary election. The list received three mandates, and he was not included in the party's assembly delegation. (From 1992 to 2000, Serbia's electoral law stipulated that one-third of parliamentary mandates would be assigned to candidates from successful lists in numerical order, with the remaining two-thirds distributed amongst other candidates on the lists at the discretion of the sponsoring parties. Pál could have been awarded a mandate despite his list position, though in the event he was not.)

The VMSZ subsequently participated in the 2000 Serbian parliamentary election as part of the Democratic Opposition of Serbia (Demokratska opozicija Srbije, DOS), a broad and ideologically diverse coalition of parties opposed to Slobodan Milošević's administration. Pál appeared in the 115th position on the alliance's list and was given a mandate when the list won a majority victory with 176 out of 250 seats. (From 2000 to 2011, all parliamentary mandates were awarded to sponsoring parties or coalitions rather than to individual candidates, and it was common practice for the mandates to be distributed out of numerical order. Pál did not receive an automatic mandate on the basis of his list position.) He took his seat when the assembly met in January 2001 and served as a supporter of the administration for the next three years.

For the 2003 parliamentary election, the VMSZ joined the Together for Tolerance ( Zajedno za toleranciju, ZZT) alliance, and Pál was given the 153rd position on their combined list. The list did not cross the electoral threshold to win representation in the assembly. Pál's parliamentary term ended when the new assembly convened in January 2004. He later appeared on the VMSZ's list in the 2007 parliamentary election and the VMSZ-led Hungarian Coalition (Magyar Koalíció , MK) list in the 2008 parliamentary election, though he did not receive a mandate on either occasion.

=== Municipal politics ===
Pál was the chairman of the Mali Iđoš executive committee prior to the May 1992 Serbian local elections.

He was elected to the Mali Iđoš municipal assembly in the May 1992 elections, once again running as an independent candidate because the Reform Democratic Party was boycotting the election. An alliance of opposition candidates won the election, and on 15 June 1992 Pál was chosen as assembly president, a position that was at the time equivalent to mayor.

An alliance of the VMDK, the RDSV, and the Democratic Movement of Serbia (DEPOS) won a majority victory in Mali Iđoš in the December 1992 local elections, and Pál was chosen for a second term as mayor in January 1993.

In the aftermath of the 1996 Serbian local elections, Pál was appointed as a member of the executive committee.

The VMSZ won a majority victory in Mali Iđoš in the 2000 Serbian local elections. After the election, Pál was chosen as president of the municipality's executive board (i.e., effectively the municipality's first minister).

He received the lead position on the VMSZ's list for Mali Iđoš in the 2004 local elections. The party won a plurality victory and emerged as the dominant party in a local coalition government; Pál was chosen as president (i.e., speaker) when the assembly convened. In 2005, he made the controversial decision to allow the Montenegrin Orthodox Church to construct a place of worship in the municipality; this decision was opposed by the Serbian government, on the grounds that the church was not recognized. Pál was given the fourth position on the Hungarian Coalition's list for Mali Iđoš in the 2008 Serbian local elections, in which the alliance won another plurality victory, and was chosen afterwards for another term as assembly president.

Serbia's electoral law was reformed in 2011, such that mandates were awarded to candidates on successful lists in numerical order. Pál received the second position on the VMSZ's list in the 2012 local elections and was elected to another term when the list won eight seats. The Democratic Party (Demokratska stranka, DS) later formed a coalition government without the VMSZ, and Pál charged that the DS had broken a pre-election pact. He did not seek re-election in 2016.

=== Party and community activism ===
Pál has served several terms as a VMSZ vice-president and has been an executive member of Serbia's Hungarian National Council. In February 2016, he oversaw the expulsion of several leading figures from the party, including a current and former mayor of Subotica.

== Electoral record ==
=== Provincial (Vojvodina) ===
December 1992 Vojvodina provincial election: Mali Iđoš
Candidate	Party	Votes	%
Károly Pál (incumbent)	Reform Democratic Party of Vojvodina–Democratic Fellowship of Vojvodina Hungarians (Affiliation: Reform Democratic Party of Vojvodina)	4,979	
Đuro Kosić	Socialist Party of Serbia	1,735	
Milivoje Avramović	Democratic Movement of Serbia		
Milorad Pejović	Democratic Party		
Pál Zetkó	Citizens' Group		
Total			
Source: Károly Pál and Đuro Kosić finished first and second, respectively; all other candidates are listed alphabetically.

May 1992 Vojvodina provincial election: Mali Iđoš
Candidate	Party	First round		Second round	
Candidate	Party	Votes	%	Votes	%
Károly Pál	Citizens' Group			3,293	56.13
Obrad Bogdanović	Socialist Party of Serbia			2,574	43.87
Milivoje Abramović	Citizens' Group				
Szilárd Baranyi	Citizens' Group				
Total				5,867	100.00
Source: Abramović and Baranyi are listed alphabetically.

=== National Assembly of Serbia ===
1990 Serbian parliamentary election: Bačka Topola and Mali Iđoš
Candidate	Party
Sándor Nagy (ELECTED)	Democratic Fellowship of Vojvodina Hungarians
Božidar Martinović	Democratic Party
Károly Pál	Union of Reform Forces of Yugoslavia in Vojvodina– Association for the Yugoslav Democratic Initiative–League of Social Democrats – Yugoslavia
Mirko Popović	Socialist Party of Serbia
Branislav Vujović	Serbian Renewal Movement
Total
Source: All candidates except Nagy are listed alphabetically.

=== Local (Mali Iđoš) ===
2000 Mali Iđoš municipal election: Division 23
Candidate	Party
Károly Pál (ELECTED)	Alliance of Vojvodina Hungarians
Lajos Bede	Citizens' Group
Miroljub Gajić	Serbian Radical Party
Veselin Vušurović	Socialist Party of Serbia–Yugoslav Left
Total
Source: All candidates except Pál are listed alphabetically.

December 1992 Mali Iđoš municipal election: Division 23
Candidate	Party
Károly Pál (incumbent) (ELECTED)	Democratic Movement of Serbia–Reform Democratic Party of Vojvodina– Democratic Fellowship of Vojvodina Hungarians (Affiliation: Reform Democratic Party of Vojvodina)
Dragoljub Žmukić (incumbent for Division 19)	Socialist Party of Serbia
Total

May 1992 Mali Iđoš municipal election: Division 23
Candidate	Party
Károly Pál (ELECTED)	Citizens' Group
Zvicer Bogić	Socialist Party of Serbia
Total
