= May 1992 Serbian local elections =

Local elections were held in cities and municipalities across Serbia on 31 May 1992, with a second round of voting on 14 June 1992. These elections were held concurrently with parliamentary elections in Yugoslavia and elections for the Vojvodina provincial assembly.

This was the first local election cycle held while Serbia was a constituent member of the Federal Republic of Yugoslavia. It took place during the authoritarian rule of Socialist Party of Serbia (SPS) leader Slobodan Milošević and his allies, and against the backdrop of wars in Croatia and Bosnia, the latter of which had started earlier in the year.

As with the Yugoslavian election and the Vojvodina provincial election, the local elections were boycotted by Serbia's main democratic opposition parties, although some members of these parties ran and were elected as independent candidates. The Democratic Fellowship of Vojvodina Hungarians (VMDK) chose to participate in the local elections on the grounds that it did not want the SPS to win by default in predominantly Hungarian areas.

The elections were held under a two-round system of voting in single-member constituencies. As expected, the Socialist Party of Serbia (SPS) won in most jurisdictions, including the capital Belgrade.

The local assemblies that were elected in May 1992 ultimately did not serve for long. Due to widespread skepticism about the legitimacy of these elections, the Serbian government called a new round of local elections for December 1992.

== Results ==
=== City of Belgrade ===
Results of the election for the City Assembly of Belgrade:

Party	Seats
Socialist Party of Serbia (SPS)	105
Serbian Radical Party (SRS)	3
Citizens' Group candidates (GG)	2
Total	110

Note: Only parties or alliances that won representation in the assembly are listed.

Results for the City Assembly of Belgrade by municipality:

Results for the City Assembly of Belgrade by municipality
Municipality	SPS	SRS	GG
Barajevo	2	-	-
Čukarica	9	1	-
Grocka	2	-	2
Lazarevac	4	-	-
Mladenovac	4	-	-
New Belgrade	14	-	-
Obrenovac	5	-	-
Palilula	11	-	-
Rakovica	5	2	-
Savski Venac	3	-	-
Sopot	2	-	-
Stari Grad	5	-	-
Voždovac	12	-	-
Vračar	5	-	-
Zemun	12	-	-
Zvezdara	10	-	-
Total	105	3	2

Slobodanka Gruden of the Socialist Party was chosen as mayor after the election.

==== Municipalities of Belgrade ====
===== Čukarica =====
Vladimir Matić served as mayor of Čukarica after the election, and Dragoljub Spasenović served as deputy mayor. Both were members of the Socialist Party of Serbia.

===== Grocka =====
Jovan Mamić served as mayor of Grocka after the election. He may not have been a member of a political party; in the December 1992 Serbian local elections, he was re-elected to the Grocka municipal assembly as a Citizens' Group candidate.

===== Lazarevac =====
Slavoljub Nikolić of the Socialist Party of Serbia served as mayor of Lazarevac after the election.

===== Mladenovac =====
Radivoje Jovanović of the Socialist Party of Serbia served as mayor of Mladenovac after the election.

===== New Belgrade =====
Incumbent New Belgrade mayor Čedomir Ždrnja, a member of the Socialist Party of Serbia, was confirmed for a new term in office after the election.

===== Palilula =====
Vladimir Rajić, a member of the Socialist Party of Serbia, served as mayor of Palilula after the election.

===== Rakovica =====
Slavica Tanasković, a member of the Socialist Party of Serbia, served as mayor of Rakovica after the election.

===== Sopot =====
Incumbent mayor Živorad Milosavljević of the Socialist Party of Serbia was confirmed for another term in office after the election.

===== Vračar =====
Nenad Bogosavljević served as mayor of Vračar after the election.

===== Zemun =====
Nenad Ribar of the Socialist Party of Serbia served as mayor of Zemun after the election.

=== Vojvodina ===
==== Central Banat District ====
===== Zrenjanin =====
Results of the election for the City Assembly of Zrenjanin:

Party	Seats
Socialist Party of Serbia	54
Citizens' Group candidates	5
Democratic Fellowship of Vojvodina Hungarians	5
People's Party	3
League of Communists – Movement for Yugoslavia	1
Serbian Radical Party	1
seats not filled	1
Total	70

Only parties or alliances that won representation in the assembly are listed. When the assembly convened on 25 June 1992, Ljubo Slijepčević was chosen as mayor, while Ivanka Stanimirov became deputy mayor and Novica Pavlović was named as chair of the executive council. All were members of the Socialist Party.

===== Nova Crnja =====
When the Nova Crnja municipal assembly convened in July 1992, Ilija Medić of the Socialists was chosen as mayor. In accordance with the municipal statute, he also served as president of the executive committee.

===== Žitište =====
Results of the election for the Municipal Assembly of Žitište:

Party	Seats
Socialist Party of Serbia	25
League of Communists – Movement for Yugoslavia	2
Citizens' Group candidates	1
Democratic Fellowship of Vojvodina Hungarians	1
seats not filled	2
Total	31

Only parties or alliances that won representation in the assembly are listed. When the municipal assembly convened on 29 June 1992, Predrag Amižić was chosen as mayor and Kosta Milivojević as deputy mayor. Both were members of the Socialist Party of Serbia. By virtue of serving as mayor, Amižić was also president of the executive committee.

==== North Bačka District ====
Elections took place in all three municipalities of the North Bačka District. The Democratic Fellowship of Vojvodina Hungarians (VMDK) won the elections in Subotica and Bačka Topola but fell short of a majority in both cases. In Subotica, the party formed a coalition government with the Democratic Alliance of Croats in Vojvodina, while in Bačka Topola it formed an administration in cooperation with the Socialist Party of Serbia.

In Mali Iđoš, local politician Károly Pál led a coalition of opposition parties to a majority victory. As some of the parties in the coalition were technically boycotting the election, all of its candidates ran as independents.

===== Subotica =====
Results of the election for the Municipal Assembly of Subotica:

Party	Seats
Democratic Fellowship of Vojvodina Hungarians	26
Socialist Party of Serbia	18
Citizens' Group candidates	8
Democratic Alliance of Croats in Vojvodina	6
Civic Movement for Subotica – Doves of Subotica	5
Bunjevac-Šokac Party	3
Citizens' Group–Socialist Party of Serbia	1
League of Communists – Movement for Yugoslavia	–
Reformist Democratic Party of Vojvodina	–
Serbian Radical Party	–
Yugoslavian Party	–
Total	67

Four of the independent (Citizens' Group) candidates were endorsed by the Democratic Fellowship of Vojvodina Hungarians. When the assembly convened on 29 June 1992, incumbent mayor József Kasza of the Democratic Fellowship of Vojvodina Hungarians was confirmed for a new term in office, Stanka Kujundžić of the Democratic Alliance of Croats in Vojvodina became deputy mayor, and Imre Kern, elected as an independent (Citizens' Group) candidate, became president of the executive committee.

===== Bačka Topola =====
Results of the election for the Municipal Assembly of Bačka Topola:

Party	Seats
Democratic Fellowship of Vojvodina Hungarians	21
Socialist Party of Serbia	14
Citizens' Group candidates	9
Serb Democratic Party	3
Reform Democratic Party of Vojvodina	2
Serb Democratic Party–Citizens' Group	1
Total	50

Only parties or alliances that won representation in the assembly are listed. When the new assembly met on 29 June 1992, János Kószó of the Democratic Fellowship of Vojvodina Hungarians was chosen as mayor, independent delegate Dániel Holló as deputy mayor, and Dragiša Kosanović of the Socialists as president of the executive council.

===== Mali Iđoš =====
Results of the election for the Municipal Assembly of Mali Iđoš:

Party	Seats
Citizens' Group candidates	15
Socialist Party of Serbia	10
Total	25

Only parties or alliances that won representation in the assembly are listed. The local boards of the Democratic Fellowship of Vojvodina Hungarians (VMDK), the Reform Democratic Party of Vojvodina (RDSV), the Democratic Party (DS), and the Serbian Renewal Movement (SPO) formed an alliance for this election. As the last two parties were technically boycotting the local elections, all candidates of the alliance ran as independents.

Károly Pál, a member of the RDSV who was elected as an independent, was chosen as mayor on 15 June 1992, defeating Mirko Popović of the Socialist Party by 14 votes to 11.

==== North Banat District ====
===== Kikinda =====
Results of the election for the Municipal Assembly of Kikinda:

Party	Seats
Socialist Party of Serbia	41
Serbian Radical Party	5
Democratic Fellowship of Vojvodina Hungarians	2
League of Communists – Movement for Yugoslavia	2
Citizens' Group candidates	1
Total	51

Only parties or alliances that won representation in the assembly are listed. When the municipal assembly convened on 29 June 1992, Rajko Matović was chosen as mayor and Živodarka Dacin was chosen as deputy mayor. Both were members of the Socialist Party of Serbia.

===== Ada =====
Results of the election for the Municipal Assembly of Ada:

Party	Seats
Democratic Fellowship of Vojvodina Hungarians	16
Socialist Party of Serbia	4
Citizens' Group candidates	3
Serbian Radical Party	2
Total	25

Only parties or alliances that won representation in the assembly are listed.

When the assembly convened on 3 July 1992, Róbert Fajka of the Democratic Fellowship of Vojvodina Hungarians (VMDK) was chosen as mayor. Miloš Cvetković of the Serbian Radical Party (SRS) ran for deputy mayor but was not successful, receiving only eight votes rather than the required majority. No other members of the municipal executive were elected when the meeting was adjourned.

Ferenc Gruber was chosen as deputy mayor and János Bozsóki as executive council president when the assembly met again on 9 July 1992. Both were members of the VMDK.

===== Čoka =====
Mirko Stojkov of the Socialist Party of Serbia was chosen as mayor of Čoka after the election.

===== Kanjiža =====
Results of the election for the Municipal Assembly of Kanjiža:

Party	Seats
Citizens' Group candidates	11
Socialist Party of Serbia	7
seats not filled	15
Total	33

Only parties or alliances that won representation in the assembly are listed.

The Democratic Fellowship of Vojvodina Hungarians (VMDK), at the time the dominant party in Serbia's Hungarian community, did not participate in the local elections in Kanjiža, and a large percentage of the municipality's majority Hungarian population appears to have boycotted the vote. In fifteen constituencies, no election took place because there were no candidates.

Although only seven of the eighteen elected delegates were formally endorsed by the Socialist Party, some of the independent delegates were also party members; Jovo Tomišić, the local leader of the Serbian Radical Party, was also elected as an independent. In practice, the Socialists appear to have had a working majority in the assembly. The Hungarian language newspaper Magyar Szó noted that only nine of the elected delegates were ethnically Hungarian (as based on their names), notwithstanding that Hungarians made up eighty-eight per cent of the municipality's population.

When the new assembly convened on 30 June 1992, Vladimir Šupić of the Socialist Party was chosen as mayor. No members of the VMDK were chosen to serve on the municipal executive, a decision that was criticized in the pages of Magyar Szó.

The VMDK later participated in the December 1992 local elections in Kanjiža and won a landslide majority.

===== Novi Kneževac =====
Incumbent Novi Kneževac mayor Dušan Jančić of the Socialist Party of Serbia was confirmed for another term in office after the election.

===== Senta =====
Results of the election for the Municipal Assembly of Senta:

Party	Seats
Democratic Fellowship of Vojvodina Hungarians	25
Socialist Party of Serbia	3
Citizens' Group candidates	1
Total	29

Only parties or alliances that won representation in the assembly are listed.

When the assembly met on 3 July 1992, Gábor Tóth Horti was chosen as mayor, Rudolf Hopp as deputy mayor, and Ferenc Szűcs as chair of the executive committee. All were members of the Democratic Fellowship of Vojvodina Hungarians.

==== South Bačka District ====
===== Novi Sad =====
Results of the election for the Municipal Assembly of Novi Sad:

Party	Seats
Socialist Party of Serbia	58
Serbian Radical Party	6
Citizens' Group candidates	4
People's Party–Serb Democratic Party	1
Yugoslav Workers' Association	1
Total	70

Only parties or alliances that won representation in the assembly are listed. Vladimir Divjaković of the Socialist Party was chosen as mayor after the election.

===== Bačka Palanka =====
Incumbent Bačka Palanka mayor Ljubomir Novaković of the Socialist Party of Serbia was confirmed for a new term in office after the election.

===== Bački Petrovac =====
Juraj Červenak, an opposition politician, served as mayor of Bački Petrovac after the election.

===== Bečej =====
Results of the election for the Municipal Assembly of Bečej:

Party	Seats
Democratic Fellowship of Vojvodina Hungarians	17
Socialist Party of Serbia	12
Citizens' Group candidates	5
Serbian Radical Party	2
Total	36

Only parties or alliances that won representation in the assembly are listed.

The first attempt at selecting a mayor, on 30 June 1992, ended in failure after three votes. The first vote was invalidated when Socialist Party candidate Miloš Stražmešterov received eighteen votes, Democratic Fellowship of Vojvodina Hungarians candidate Endre Huszágh received seventeen, and one ballot included a vote for both candidates. On the second vote, Huszágh received eighteen votes, Stražmešterov received seventeen, and there was one blank ballot. As a majority of votes was required, this was not sufficient for Huszágh to become mayor. On the third ballot, Husźagh received seventeen votes, Stražmešterov received fourteen, and five ballots were invalid. During this meeting of the assembly, it was noted that the Radical delegates and three of the independents were aligned with the Socialists, while the other two independents were not aligned with any group.

When the local assembly convened for a second time on 6 July 1992, Stražmešterov was elected as mayor with nineteen votes, as against seventeen for László Fehér of the Democratic Fellowship of Vojvodina Hungarians.

===== Sremski Karlovci =====
Incumbent Sremski Karlovci mayor Pavle Štraser of the Socialist Party of Serbia was confirmed for another term in office after the election.

===== Temerin =====
Results of the election for the Municipal Assembly of Temerin:

Party	Seats
Socialist Party of Serbia	16
Democratic Fellowship of Vojvodina Hungarians	12
Citizens' Group candidates	1
League of Communists – Movement for Yugoslavia	1
Serbian Radical Party	1
Total	31

Only parties or alliances that won representation in the assembly are listed.

The municipal assembly convened on 29 June 1992. Stevan Vještica was chosen as mayor, Jovan Pekez as deputy mayor, and Draško Kovačević as president of the executive committee. All were members of the Socialist Party.

===== Vrbas =====
Srđan Stokuća of the Socialist Party of Serbia served as mayor of Vrbas after the election.

==== South Banat District ====
===== Pančevo =====
Party	Seats
Socialist Party of Serbia	41
Serbian Radical Party	11
Total	52

Only parties that won seats are listed.

Vlastimir Savić was chosen as mayor after the election, while Bogoljub Bjelica was chosen as deputy mayor. Both were members of the Socialist Party of Serbia.

===== Kovačica =====
Vaso Vujović served as mayor of Kovačica after the election.

==== Srem District ====
===== Irig =====
Momčilo Potić served as mayor of Irig after the election.

===== Ruma =====
Divna Ićitović served as mayor of Ruma after the election.

===== Stara Pazova =====
Đorđe Božić of the Socialist Party of Serbia served as mayor of Stara Pazova after the election.

==== West Bačka District ====
===== Sombor =====
Nikola Jelovac became the mayor of Sombor after the election. He fell seriously ill early in his term, and although he formally served until January 1993 his condition did not significantly improve during this time.

===== Apatin =====
Results of the election for the Municipal Assembly of Apatin:

Party	Seats
Socialist Party of Serbia	29
Citizens' Group candidates	6
Serbian Radical Party	6
Serb Democratic Party	2
Greens of Apatin	–
League of Communists – Movement for Yugoslavia	–
Total	43

When the assembly convened on 1 July 1992, Dušan Novković was chosen as mayor and Nikola Tatalović as deputy mayor. On 3 August 1992, Miloš Ševarac was chosen as president of the executive council. All were members of the Socialist Party of Serbia.

===== Kula =====
Miladin Stojanović served as mayor of Kula after the election, and Božidar Jovanović served as deputy mayor. Both were members of the Socialist Party of Serbia.

=== Central Serbia (excluding Belgrade) ===
==== Braničevo District ====
===== Malo Crniće =====
Nikodije Adamović served as mayor of Malo Crniće after the election.

===== Žabari =====
Dušan Pajić served as mayor of Žabari after the election.

==== Kolubara District ====
===== Ljig =====
Ljubivoje Vujić of the Socialist Party of Serbia served as mayor of Ljig after the election.

===== Mionica =====
Dragomir Kovačević served as mayor of Mionica after the election.

==== Moravica District ====
===== Čačak =====
First round results of the election for the Municipal Assembly of Čačak:

Party	Seats
Socialist Party of Serbia	47
Serbian Radical Party	5
Citizens' Group candidates	3
Not listed or carried over to a second round run-off	15
Total	70

Following the election, Rodoljub Petrović was chosen as mayor, Ljubomir Sikora as deputy mayor, and Mihailo Marić as president of the executive board; all were members of the Socialist Party.

===== Gornji Milanovac =====
Dražimir Marušić of the Socialist Party of Serbia became the mayor of Gornji Milanovac after the election.

==== Nišava District ====
===== Niš =====
Results of the election for the City Assembly of Niš:

Party	Seats
Socialist Party of Serbia	65
Citizens' Group candidates	4
Serbian Radical Party	1
Total	70

Stojan Ranđelović of the Socialist Party of Serbia was chosen as mayor after the election.

==== Pčinja District ====
===== Vranje =====
Results of the election for the Municipal Assembly of Vranje:

Party	Seats
Socialist Party of Serbia	42
Total	42

Dragan Tomić of the Socialist Party of Serbia was chosen as mayor after the election. (Tomić is not to be confused with Dragomir Dragan Tomić, the longtime leader of the Vranje-based company Simpo.)

===== Bosilegrad =====
Sotir Sotirov of the Socialist Party of Serbia served as mayor of Bosilegrad after the election.

===== Surdulica =====
Miroslav Stojiljković of the Socialist Party of Serbia was chosen as mayor of Surdulica when the assembly convened on 24 June 1992. Đura Veselinović, as the oldest delegate, presided over the assembly on an interim basis. By virtue of serving as mayor, Stojiljković was also the president of the assembly's executive committee.

==== Rasina District ====
===== Kruševac =====
The Socialist Party of Serbia won the local elections in Kruševac, and Živorad Jovanović of the Socialists served afterward as mayor.

==== Raška District ====
===== Novi Pazar =====
Konstantin Jovanović of the Socialist Party of Serbia served as mayor of Novi Pazar after the elections.

===== Vrnjačka Banja =====
Miroslav Čeperković served as mayor of Vrnjačka Banja after the election.

==== Šumadija District ====
===== Kragujevac =====
Živorad Nešić was chosen as mayor of Kragujevac on 30 June 1992, while Dragić Lazić was chosen as deputy mayor and Milorad Matić as president of the executive board. All were members of the Socialist Party of Serbia.

===== Topola =====
Živko Lazić served as mayor of Topola after the election.

==== Toplica District ====
===== Prokuplje =====
Petar Stojković served as president of the executive committee of the Prokuplje municipal assembly after the election.

===== Kuršumlija =====
Strahinja Filipović served as mayor of Kuršumlija after the election.

==== Zlatibor District ====
The Socialist Party of Serbia won landslide victories in most jurisdictions of the Zlatibor District. Sjenica did not elect a viable local assembly due to a widespread boycott among members of the area's Bosniak community; in this jurisdiction, the Serbian government appointed a governing council led by a member of the Socialists.

===== Uźice =====
Results of the election for the Municipal Assembly of Užice:

Party	Seats
Socialist Party of Serbia	63
Serbian Radical Party	2
Citizens' Group candidates	1
not confirmed (possibly Serbian Radical Party)	1
Total	67

Incumbent mayor Zoran Vujović was confirmed for another term in office after the election, while Vidoje Drndarević was chosen as deputy mayor and Milan Marinković as president of the assembly's executive committee. All were members of the Socialist Party of Serbia.

===== Bajina Bašta =====
In Bajina Bašta, the Socialist Party of Serbia won thirty-two seats in the first round of voting and the Serbian Radical Party won one. It is unclear how many seats were determined in a second-round runoff.

===== Čajetina =====
In Čajetina, the Socialist Party of Serbia won twenty-five seats in the first round of voting and citizens' group candidates won four. It is unclear how many seats were determined in a second-round runoff.

===== Kosjerić =====
In Kosjerić, the Socialist Party of Serbia won sixteen seats in the first round of voting and citizens' group candidates won ten. It is unclear how many seats were determined in a second-round runoff.

===== Nova Varoš =====
Milanko Kolović served as mayor of Nova Varoš after the election.

===== Požega =====
First round results of the election for the Municipal Assembly of Požega:

Party	Seats
Socialist Party of Serbia	49
Carried over to a second-round runoff	3
Total	52

Nikola Kulić, presumably of the Socialist Party, served as mayor after the election.

===== Priboj =====
First round results of the election for the Municipal Assembly of Priboj:

Party	Seats
Socialist Party of Serbia	26
Serbian Radical Party	5
Citizens' Group candidates	3
not listed; presumably carried out to a second-round runoff	7
Total	41

Incumbent mayor Milić Popović of the Socialist Party of Serbia was confirmed for another term in office after the election.

===== Prijepolje =====
First round results of the election for the Municipal Assembly of Prijepolje:

Party	Seats
Socialist Party of Serbia	46
Citizens' Group candidates	1
Carried over to a second-round runoff	10
Total	57

Radojko Petrić was chosen as mayor after the election, while Dragan Vasojević served as president of the executive committee. Both were members of the Socialist Party of Serbia.

===== Sjenica =====
Due to a widespread boycott within the Muslim community, the election in Sjenica did not produce a viable municipal assembly. On 8 October 1992, the Serbian government appointed a council in Sjenica. Radoslav Rakonjac of the Socialist Party of Serbia served as the council's president and Mustafa Džigal as its vice-president.

=== Kosovo and Metohija ===
The elections in Kosovo and Metohija were largely boycotted by members of the Kosovo Albanian community, which had set up parallel governing institutions in the province in 1991 under the name of the Republic of Kosova.

==== Kosovo District ====
===== Priština =====
Results of the election for the City Assembly of Priština:

Party	Seats
Socialist Party of Serbia	18
Serbian Radical Party	11
Citizens' Group candidates	4
People's Radical Party	1
deferred?	1
Total	35

Novica Sojević of the Socialist Party of Serbia was chosen as mayor of Priština on 16 July 1992, while Zvonimir Stević of the Socialists defeated Uglješa Čolić of the Serbian Radical Party to become deputy mayor. Dušan Simić, also of the Socialists, served as president of the executive board.

===== Glogovac =====
In Glogovac, the Serbian government appointed a municipal council. Savo Šćepanović served as its president and Slavko Đumić as its vice president.

===== Kačanik =====
In Kačanik, the Serbian government appointed a municipal council led by Radosav Ognjanović.

===== Kosovo Polje =====
Results of the election for the Municipal Assembly of Kosovo Polje:

Party	Seats
Socialist Party of Serbia	26
Citizens' Group candidates/other	6
seats apparently not filled	3
Total	35

Ratomir Maksimović was chosen as mayor on 13 September 1992. Cvetko Cvetković, as the oldest delegate, presided over the assembly on an interim basis. On 26 September, Borko Spasić was chosen as deputy mayor, and incumbent executive committee president Zoran Grujić was confirmed for another term in office. All were members of the Socialist Party.

===== Lipljan =====
Branimir Jovanović served as mayor of Lipljan after the election.

===== Obilić =====
When the municipal assembly of Obilić convened on 2 August 1992, Milutin Nikolić was chosen as mayor, Milorad Lazić as deputy mayor, and Boško Šćepanović as president of the assembly's executive committee. Borivoje Marković, the oldest delegate, presided over the assembly on an interim basis.

===== Podujevo =====
Dragan Milovanović of the Serbian Radical Party was chosen as mayor of Podujevo on 15 July 1992. Mileta Lakićević, as the oldest delegate, presided over the assembly on an interim basis. On 19 August 1992, Stražimir Ilić was chosen as president of the assembly's executive committee.

===== Štimlje =====
On 8 October 1992, the Serbian government appointed a municipal council to govern Štimlje. Novica Kostić served as the council's president and Milorad Talić as its vice-president.

===== Štrpce =====
Bogoljub Janićević of the Socialist Party of Serbia served as mayor of Štrpce after the election.

===== Uroševac =====
On 10 July 1992, Nebojša Petković was chosen as mayor of Uroševac, while Dobrivoje Mladenović was chosen as deputy mayor and Ognjan Đorđević as president of the assembly's executive committee. Bedžet Berati, the oldest delegate, presided over the assembly on an interim basis.

==== Kosovo-Pomoravlje District ====
===== Kosovska Kamenica =====
Panajot Denić of the Socialist Party of Serbia served as mayor of Kosovska Kamenica after the election.

===== Vitina =====
Nikola Danić served as mayor of Vitina after the election.

==== Kosovska Mitrovica District ====
===== Kosovska Mitrovica =====
Predrag Orlić served as mayor of Kosovska Mitrovica after the election, while Zoran Bratić served as president of the executive committee.

===== Srbica =====
The Serbian government appointed a municipal council in Srbica led by Dragomir Bulatović. Sadik Topalaj served as president of the executive committee.

===== Vučitrn =====
Branko Stolić served as mayor of Vučitrn after the election. Zoran Dimitrijević initially served as president of the executive committee; he stood down on 24 November 1992 and was replaced by Uroš Stojanović.

===== Zubin Potok =====
Gordan Kasalović of the Serbian Radical Party served as mayor of Zubin Potok after the election.

===== Zvečan =====
When the Zvečan municipal assembly convened on 3 July 1992, Milorad Laketić was chosen as mayor and Žarko Ristić as deputy mayor. On 14 August 1992, Vitomir Mitrović became president of the executive committee, and Desimir Petković became its vice-president.

==== Peć District ====
===== Peć =====
Jovo Popović of the Socialist Party of Serbia served as mayor of Peć after the election. On 12 August 1992, Milija Mirić, also of the Socialists, was chosen as president of the assembly's executive committee.

===== Dečani =====
On 8 October 1992, the Serbian government appointed a new municipal council to govern Dečani. Incumbent council president Milivoje Đurković of the Socialist Party of Serbia was confirmed for a new term in office, and Ilija Jovanović was appointed as the council's vice-president.

===== Đakovica =====
When the Đakovica municipal assembly convened on 7 July 1992, Božidar Dimić was chosen as mayor. Veličko Milović, the oldest delegate, presided over the assembly on an interim basis. Momčilo Obradović served as president of the assembly's executive committee.

===== Istok =====
Results of the election for the Municipal Assembly of Istok:

Party	Seats
Socialist Party of Serbia	22
Citizens' Group candidates	3
Serbian Radical Party	3
Total	28

Mališa Perović of the Socialist Party of Serbia served as mayor after the election.

===== Klina =====
When the Klina municipal assembly convened on 3 July 1992, Vlado Prodović was chosen as mayor, and Sveto Dabižljević was chosen as president of the assembly's executive committee. Prodović had served as executive committee president in the previous term.

==== Prizren District ====
===== Prizren =====
Dragoljub Stanišić served as mayor of Prizren after the election.

===== Gora =====
Harun Hasani served as mayor of Gora after the election, while Ljajko Zirfet was chosen as president of the assembly's executive committee on 7 September 1992. Both were members of the Socialist Party of Serbia.

===== Suva Reka =====
When the assembly of Suva Reka convened on 29 June 1992, former municipal council president Boban Vuksanović was chosen as mayor, Zlatan Jovanović as deputy mayor, and Jovan Cvetković as president of the executive committee.
