= Surova =

Surova may refer to:

- Surova, feminine for Surov, Russian surname
- Surová, feminine for Surový, Czech and Slovak surname
