= Stevan Vještica =

Serbian politician

Stevan Vještica (Serbian Cyrillic: Стеван Вјештица) was a Serbian politician in the 1990s. He was the mayor of Temerin from 1992 to 1993 and was a deputy speaker of the Vojvodina provincial assembly in the 1993–97 term. During his time in public office, Vještica was a member of the Socialist Party of Serbia (SPS).

== Private career ==
As of 1992, Vještica was an agricultural engineer.

== Politician ==
=== Mayor of Temerin ===
Vještica was elected to the Temerin municipal assembly in the May 1992 Serbian local elections, the first that were held after Serbia's de jure return to multiparty democracy in 1990. The Socialist Party won a majority of seats in the municipality, and when the new assembly convened on 29 June 1992 Vještica was chosen as its president, a position that was at the time equivalent to mayor. During his brief term in office, he represented Temerin in negotiations for a potential merger with Novi Sad. In November 1992, he remarked that nothing would stand in the way of a merger if Temerin's economic independence was guaranteed. Ultimately, the merger did not take place.

He was also elected for the Temerin division in the May 1992 Vojvodina provincial election, which was held concurrently with the local vote. The Socialist Party won a landslide majority, and he served as a supporter of the government.

=== Deputy speaker of the Provincial Assembly ===
Vještica was re-elected to the Temerin municipal assembly in the December 1992 Serbian local elections. Although the Democratic Fellowship of Vojvodina Hungarians (VMDK) won the greatest number of seats in the municipality, the Socialists remained in power by forming a coalition government with the far-right Serbian Radical Party (SRS). Vještica was succeeded as mayor by Branko Rujević, also of the SPS, when the new assembly met on 22 January 1993.

He was re-elected to the provincial assembly in the December 1992 provincial election, in which the Socialists won the greatest number of seats but fell below majority status. At the first meeting of the new assembly on 26 January 1993, Milutin Stojković of the Socialist Party was chosen as assembly president, while Vještica was chosen as one of three vice-presidents. After taking this position, he said that he would strive to preserve Serbia's unity, while also seeking capital transfers to the provincial government and an improvement of Vojvodina's agricultural situation.

He did not seek re-election to the provincial assembly in 1996.

== Electoral record ==
=== Provincial (Vojvodina) ===
December 1992 Vojvodina provincial election: Temerin
Candidate	Party	Votes	%
Stevan Vještica (incumbent)	Socialist Party of Serbia		elected
Döme Csaba	Democratic Fellowship of Vojvodina Hungarians		
Milorad Žikić	Reform Democratic Party of Vojvodina		
Dušan Milojević	Serbian Radical Party		
Miodrag Oklješa	Serb Democratic Party		
Total			
Source: All candidates except Vještica are listed alphabetically.

May 1992 Vojvodina provincial election: Temerin (Second Round)
Candidate	Party	Votes	%
Stevan Vještica	Socialist Party of Serbia		elected
Zorica Jokić	Serbian Radical Party		
Total			
