= Dragan Milovanović =

Dragan Milovanović may refer to:

- Dragan Milovanović (politician, born 1953), Serbian politician
- Dragan Milovanović (politician, born 1955), Serbian politician
- Dragan Milovanović (footballer) (born 1986), Serbian footballer
