= Surovy =

Surovy may refer to:

- Surovy (surname), a family name
- Soviet destroyer Surovy (1940)

== See also ==
- Surovi
