= Uglješa Čolić =

Serbian politician (born 1950)

Uglješa Čolić (Serbian Cyrillic: Угљеша Чолић; born 1950) is a Serbian former politician. He served in the Serbian parliament from 1993 to 1994. During his political career, Čolić was a member of the far-right Serbian Radical Party (SRS).

== Education ==
Čolić holds a degree in mechanical engineering.

== Political career ==
A Kosovo Serb, Čolić was elected to the Priština city assembly in the May 1992 Serbian local elections. The Socialist Party of Serbia (SPS) won the elections in the city; when the assembly convened on 16 July 1992, Čolić ran to become its vice-president, a position that was then equivalent to deputy mayor. He lost to Socialist candidate Zvonimir Stević.

Čolić appeared in the second position on the Radical Party's electoral list for the Priština division in the 1992 Serbian parliamentary election and was elected when the list won five seats. (From 1992 to 2000, Serbia's electoral law stipulated that one-third of parliamentary mandates would be assigned to candidates from successful lists in numerical order, while the remaining two-thirds would be distributed amongst other candidates at the discretion of the sponsoring parties. Due to rounding, Čolić was automatically elected.) He took his seat when the assembly convened in January 1993 and served on the committee for Kosovo and Metohija.

The Socialist Party won a plurality victory in the 1992 Serbian parliamentary election and initially governed in an informal alliance with the Radicals. This alliance broke down in mid-1993, and a new parliamentary election was held in December of that year. Čolić appeared in the third position on the Radical Party's list for Priština; the party fell to two seats in the division, and he did not receive a mandate for a second term. His term ended when the new assembly convened in January 1994.
