= Vještica =

Vještica is a Slavic surname. Notable people with the surname include:

- Milan Vještica (born 1979), Serbian footballer
- Stevan Vještica (fl. 1992–1996), Serbian politician

== See also ==
- George Vjestica (born 1967), British guitarist and songwriter
