= Surovi (disambiguation) =

Surovi is a villaga in Republika Srpska, Bosnia and Herzegovina.

Surovi may also refer to:

- BNS Surovi, Bangladeshi minesweeper
- Pavel Surovi, Serbian politician
