= Surovy (surname) =

Surovy or Surový is a surname. Czech feminine form: Surová. Alternative spellings include Surovi (in Serbia), Szurovy (Hungary), and Surowy (Poland).

Notable people with the surname include:

- Pavel Surovi or Surový (born 1980), Slovak-Serbian politician
- Tomáš Surový (born 1981), Slovak ice hockey player
- Walter Surovy (1910–2001), Austrian actor

== See also ==
- Surov, surname
- Surovy (disambiguation)
