= Dragan Tomić (Serbian politician, born 1946) =

Serbian politician

Dragan Tomić (Serbian Cyrillic: Драган Томић; born 1946) is a Serbian politician and administrator. He was the mayor of Vranje from 1992 to 1994, served in the Serbian parliament from 1993 to 1994, and was the head of the Pčinja District from 1994 to 1998. During his time in public office, Tomić was a member of the Socialist Party of Serbia (SPS).

== Private career ==
Tomić is a graduated economist.

== Politician ==
=== The 1990s ===
The Socialist Party dominated the political life of Serbia in the 1990s under the authoritarian leadership of Slobodan Milošević.

Tomić was elected to the Vranje municipal assembly in the May 1992 Serbian local elections. The Socialists won a landslide majority victory, due in part to a boycott by many of Serbia's opposition parties, and he was chosen afterwards as mayor.

The Socialists won another landslide majority government in Vranje in the December 1992 Serbian local elections, winning forty-four out of forty-nine seats. Tomić was chosen afterward for another term as mayor. In June 1993, he criticized the republican and Yugoslavian federal governments for not doing enough to curb inflation.

Tomić also appeared in the fifth position on the Socialist Party's electoral list for the Leskovac division in the 1992 Serbian parliamentary election, which took place concurrently with the December 1992 local vote. He was elected when the list won fifteen mandates and took his seat when the assembly convened in January 1993. (From 1992 to 2000, Serbia's electoral law stipulated that one-third of parliamentary mandates would be assigned to candidates from successful lists in numerical order, while the remaining two-thirds would be distributed amongst other candidates at the discretion of the sponsoring parties. Tomić was automatically elected by virtue of his list position.) In the assembly, he served on the finance committee.

The Socialists won the 1992 election but fell short of a majority with 101 seats out of 250. The party initially governed in a sort of informal alliance with the Serbian Radical Party (SRS), which finished in second place with seventy-three seats. The alliance broke down later in the year, however, and a new parliamentary election took place in December 1993. Tomić was not a candidate, and his term ended in January 1994.

The Serbian government appointed Tomić as head of the Pčinja District in June 1994. By virtue of holding this position, he resigned as mayor of Vranje.

More than two thousand refugees from the former Republic of Serbian Krajina relocated to the Pčinja District in the aftermath of Operation Storm in 1995. On 17 August of that year, Tomić said that he was not satisfied with way the refugees were being accommodated, notwithstanding that all reasonable efforts were being made to provide them with food and clothing.

Tomić's term as head of the Pčinja District ended in 1998.

=== 2000 and after ===
Slobodan Milošević fell from power in October 2000, following his defeat in the 2000 Yugoslavian presidential election. The Socialist Party ceased to be the dominant power in Serbian politics after this time.

In November 2000, a group of former Socialists under the leadership of Milorad Vučelić formed the breakaway Democratic Socialist Party (DSP). Tomić joined the new party and appeared in the 112th position on its electoral list in the 2000 Serbian parliamentary election. (Prior to the vote, Serbia's electoral laws were reformed such that the entire country became a single at-large electoral division and all mandates were assigned at the discretion of the sponsoring parties or coalitions, irrespective of numerical order.) The DSP's list ultimately received less than one per cent of the vote and did not cross the electoral threshold. In February 2003, the party merged back into the Socialist Party.

Tomić later appeared in the 150th position on the list of the Social Democratic Alliance, a short-lived left-wing grouping, in the 2012 Serbian parliamentary election. This list, too, failed to cross the threshold.

== Electoral record ==
=== Local (Vranje) ===
December 1992 Vranje municipal election: Kriva Feja division
| Candidate | Party | Votes | % |
|---|---|---|---|
| Dragan Tomić (incumbent) | Socialist Party of Serbia | | elected |
| Goran Dimiš | Democratic Movement of Serbia | | |
| Đorđe Ivanović | Citizens' Group | | |
| Andrija Stojanović | Citizens' Group | | |
| Igor Veljković | Serbian National Renewal | | |
| Total | | | |
Source: All candidates except Tomić are listed alphabetically.
