= Slavica Tanasković =

Serbian politician (born 1950)

Slavica Tanasković (Serbian Cyrillic: Славица Танасковић; born 1950) is a Serbian former politician. She was the mayor of the Belgrade municipality of Rakovica from 1992 to 1996 and was a member of the Serbian parliament from 1996 to 1997. During her time as an elected official, Tanasković was a member of the Socialist Party of Serbia (SPS).

== Early life and career ==
Tanasković is a lawyer. She moved to Rakovica following the municipality's establishment in 1974.

== Politician ==
Tanasković was the president of the Rakovica municipal assembly's executive board from 1988 to 1992. She was elected to the municipal assembly in the May 1992 Serbian local elections and was chosen afterward as assembly president, a position that was at the time equivalent to mayor.

She was re-elected to the assembly in the December 1992 Serbian local elections, in which the Socialists won a narrow majority victory with twenty-six out of fifty seats. On 25 January 1993, she was confirmed for a second term as mayor.

Tanasković also appeared in the twenty-eighth position on the Socialist Party's electoral list for the Belgrade electoral division in the 1992 Serbian parliamentary election, which took place concurrently with the December 1992 local vote. The list won fourteen seats, and she was not included the party's assembly delegation. (From 1992 to 2000, Serbia's electoral law stipulated that one-third of parliamentary mandates would be assigned to candidates from successful lists in numerical order, while the remaining two-thirds would be distributed amongst other candidates at the discretion of the sponsoring parties. Tanasković could have been given a mandate despite her list position, but she was not.)

She later appeared in the eighteenth position on the SPS's list for Belgrade in the 1993 Serbian parliamentary election and did not initially receive a mandate when the list won sixteen seats. The Socialists won a strong plurality victory in this election and afterwards formed a new administration with support from the New Democracy (ND) party. On 27 May 1996, Tanasković was given a parliamentary mandate as a replacement for Slobodan Unković, who had stood down. She served as a supporter of the government.

The Socialist Party lost power in several jurisdictions in the 1996 Serbian local elections. In Rakovica, the opposition Zajedno coalition won a majority victory with thirty-two seats, while the Socialists fell to only six seats. Tanasković was one of the SPS candidates who was re-elected and led the party's local assembly group in the term that followed.

She was not a candidate in the 1997 Serbian parliamentary election, and her term in the national assembly ended in that year.

Prior to the 2000 Serbian parliamentary election, Serbia's electoral laws were reformed such that the entire country became a single electoral unit and all mandates were to be awarded to candidates on successful lists at the discretion of the sponsoring parties or coalitions, irrespective of numerical order. Tanasković received the 230th position on the SPS's list, which was mostly alphabetical, and was not given a mandate when the party won thirty-seven seats. She does not appear to have returned to political life after this time.

== Electoral record ==
=== Municipal (Rakovica) ===
1996 Rakovica municipal election: Division 25
Candidate	Party	Votes	%
Slavica Tanasković (incumbent)	Socialist Party of Serbia		elected
other candidates			
Total			
