= Dražimir Marušić =

Serbian politician

Dražimir Marušić (Serbian Cyrillic: Дражимир Марушић; 2 October 1951 – 14 August 2010) was a Serbian politician. He was the mayor of Gornji Milanovac for all but one term between 1992 and his death and served in the Serbian parliament from 1994 to 2001. Marušić was a member of the Socialist Party of Serbia (SPS).

== Early life and career ==
Marušić was born in the village of Pranjani in the municipality of Gornji Milanovac, in what was then the People's Republic of Serbia in the Federal People's Republic of Yugoslavia. He graduated from the University of Belgrade Faculty of Law in 1975 and afterward returned to Gornji Milanovac to beginning working for the municipal assembly.

== Politician ==
=== Before 1990 ===
Marušić was secretary of the Secretariat for Social and Communal Affairs and Inspection Affairs in the Gornji Milanovac assembly from 1980 to 1989. From 1989 to 1992, he was president of the assembly's executive council.

=== The Milošević Years ===
Serbia transitioned, at least nominally, from a one-party socialist state to a multi-party democracy in 1990, and Marušić became a founding member of the Socialist Party of Serbia in that year. In the decade that followed, the SPS dominated Serbian politics under the authoritarian leadership of Slobodan Milošević. Marušić was elected to the Gornji Milanovac assembly in the May 1992 Serbian local elections and was afterward chosen as its president, a position that was then equivalent to mayor.

The May 1992 elections were boycotted by several of Serbia's leading opposition parties, and, due to ongoing doubts about the legitimacy of the vote, a new round of local elections took place in December 1992. The SPS won the repeat elections in Gornji Milanovac; Marušić, who was re-elected to the assembly in the first round of voting, was chosen for a second term as mayor.

Marušić appeared in the eighth position on the SPS's electoral list for the Kragujevac division in the 1993 Serbian parliamentary election. The list won twelve seats, and he was awarded a mandate in the national assembly. (From 1992 to 2000, Serbia's electoral law stipulated that one-third of parliamentary mandates would be assigned to candidates from successful lists in numerical order, while the remaining two-thirds would be distributed amongst other candidates at the discretion of the sponsoring parties. Marušić was not automatically elected by virtue of his list position, but he received a mandate all the same.) The Socialists won a strong plurality victory overall in the 1993 election and afterward formed a new government with support from the smaller New Democracy (ND) party. In the assembly, Marušić served as a member of the finance committee.

In February 1995, Marušić introduced a proposal in the Serbian parliament to allow municipalities to determine the number of seats in their local assemblies, up to a maximum of eighty. He said that there was no reason for the matter to be determined by legislation at the republic level.

After the fall of the Republic of Serbian Krajina and the expulsion of much of the area's Serb population in August 1995, Marušić said that the situation ultimately resulted from the "unacceptable behaviour of certain people from the leadership of Krajina and Republika Srpska" who refused to accept diplomatic initiatives supported by Serbia and the Contact Group.

Marušić took part in a delegation to Moscow in March 1996 that reviewed previously unopened documents related to the Obrenović dynasty and the First Serbian Uprising. He was responsible for selecting documents from the cache to be photocopied for the benefit of Serbian researchers.

The Socialist Party won a majority victory in Gornji Milanovac in the 1996 Serbian local elections, taking forty out of seventy seats. Marušić was chosen afterward for a third term as mayor. He welcomed a new republican law on local self-government in July 1997 and opposed efforts by some parliamentarians to delegate more power to local authorities. "Only when we have citizens who are one hundred percent loyal to this country can we think about a greater degree of local self-government," he was quoted as saying.

The Socialists contested the 1997 Serbian parliamentary election in an alliance with the Yugoslav Left (JUL) and New Democracy. Marušić appeared in the second position on the alliance's list for the smaller, redistributed Čačak division and was given a mandate for a second term when the list won exactly two seats. The SPS's alliance won 110 out of 250 seats overall in the national assembly, and in early 1998 the SPS formed a new coalition government with the JUL and the far-right Serbian Radical Party (SRS).

=== The Fall of Milošević and After ===
Slobodan Milošević was defeated by Vojislav Koštunica in the 2000 Yugoslavian presidential election and subsequently fell from power on 5 October 2000, a watershed moment in Serbian and Yugoslavian politics. The SPS also lost its hold on power in several municipalities in the concurrent 2000 Serbian local elections. In Gornji Milanovac, the Democratic Opposition of Serbia (DOS) won seventy-two out of ninety seats in the expanded local assembly, while the SPS–JUL alliance fell to only sixteen. Marušić was personally re-elected and served in opposition for the term that followed.

The Serbian government also fell soon after Milošević's defeat, and a transitional government supported by the SPS, the DOS, and the Serbian Renewal Movement (SPO) took power pending a new parliamentary election. Prior to the vote, Serbia's electoral laws were changed such that the entire country became a single electoral division and all mandates were to be assigned to candidates at the discretion of the sponsoring parties and coalitions, irrespective of numerical order. Marušić appeared in the 122nd position on the Socialist Party's list (which was mostly alphabetical) in the 2000 Serbian parliamentary election and did not receive a new mandate when the party fell to thirty-seven seats. He later appeared in the 140th position on the SPS's list for the 2003 Serbian parliamentary election was again not assigned a mandate when the list won twenty-two seats.

For the 2004 local elections, Serbia introduced direct elections for mayors and separated the offices of mayor and assembly president. Marušić ran for a new term as mayor of Gornji Milanovac, leading a coalition of the Socialist Party, a local group called "Victory for Gornji Milanovac," and the Party of Sports Supporters of Serbia. He was elected in the second round of voting. Marušić's alliance also won a plurality victory with sixteen out of forty-nine seats in the restructured local assembly; the alliance afterward formed a coalition government with the Serbian Radical Party, Social Democracy (SD), and the Christian Democratic Party of Serbia (DHSS).

Gornji Milanovac later held off-year elections for the municipal assembly in 2006. Marušić's alliance once again won a plurality victory with sixteen seats, but the overall seat numbers favoured the opposition parties, led by the Democratic Party of Serbia (DSS)–New Serbia (NS) alliance. Although Marušić's mayoralty was not directly affected by the vote, he had a very fraught relationship with the assembly over the next two years.

Marušić appeared in the 130th position on the SPS's electoral list in the 2007 Serbian parliamentary election. The list won only sixteen seats, and he was again not chosen for a mandate. He resigned from all official positions in the Socialist Party in March 2007, citing disagreements with the party leadership under Ivica Dačić, although he did not resign from the party itself.

The direct election of mayors proved to be a short-lived experiment and was abandoned with the 2008 local election cycle; since this time, mayors in Serbia have been chosen by elected members of the local assemblies. Marušić led the SPS's "Victory for the Municipality of Gornji Milanovac" coalition list to another plurality victory in 2008, with the alliance once again taking sixteen out of forty-nine seats. He also appeared in the 133rd position on the SPS's list in the concurrent 2008 Serbian parliamentary election and, once again, did not receive a mandate after the list won twenty seats.

Marušić initially planned to form a new local government with the Radicals and New Serbia after the 2008 elections. After the Socialists joined a coalition government with the Democratic Party (DS) at the republic level, however, he ended his alliance with the Radicals and brought the DS into the local administration in their place.

In October 2008, Marušić signed a cooperation agreement between Gornji Milanovac and Nowogard, Poland, which was to be highlighted by an education exchange.

== Death ==
Marušić died on 14 August 2010. An obituary notice from the municipality of Gornji Milanovac listed his accomplishments as including the construction of the water system "Rzav," the gasification of the municipality, and the construction of a waste water treatment system.

== Electoral record ==
=== Local (Gornji Milanovac) ===
2004 Gornji Milanovac local election: Mayor of Gornji Milanovac
| Candidate | Party | First round | | Second round | |
| Candidate | Party | Votes | % | Votes | % |
|---|---|---|---|---|---|
| Dražimir Marušić | Socialist Party of Serbia–Citizens' Group: Victory for Gornji Milanovac– Party of Sports Supporters of Serbia (Affiliation: Socialist Party of Serbia) | 6,379 | 41.32 | 9,613 | 53.42 |
| Vladimir Simović (incumbent) | Democratic Party of Serbia | 2,727 | 17.66 | 8,381 | 46.58 |
| Zoran Vasović | Democratic Party–New Serbia (Affiliation: Democratic Party) | 1,570 | 10.17 | | |
| Dr. Branko Vujičić | Strength of Serbia Movement | 1,147 | 7.43 | | |
| Dr. Miroslav Nedeljković | Serbian Radical Party | 1,010 | 6.54 | | |
| Zoran Milošević | Citizens' Group: For Our Municipality | 656 | 4.25 | | |
| Gojko Stefanović | G17 Plus | 585 | 3.79 | | |
| Božidar Vučetić | Serbian Renewal Movement | 563 | 3.65 | | |
| Dr. Zoran Koprivica | Social Democracy–Christian Democratic Party of Serbia | 543 | 3.52 | | |
| Nikola Novaković | Citizens' Group: For Milanovac | 258 | 1.67 | | |
| Total | | 15,438 | 100.00 | 17,994 | 100.00 |
| Valid votes | | 15,438 | 97.41 | 17,794 | 98.43 |
| Invalid/blank votes | | 410 | 2.59 | 284 | 1.57 |
| Total votes | | 15,848 | 100.00 | 18,078 | 100.00 |
| Registered voters/turnout | | 39,616 | 40.00 | 39,616 | 45.63 |

2000 Gornji Milanovac Municipal Election: Division 5
| Candidate | Party | Votes | % |
|---|---|---|---|
| Dražimir Marušić (incumbent) | Socialist Party of Serbia–Yugoslav Left–Slobodan Milošević (Affiliation: Socialist Party of Serbia) | | elected |
| Svetozar Milošević | Democratic Opposition of Serbia | | |
| Total | | | |
