= Ljubomir Novaković =

Serbian politician

Ljubomir Novaković (Serbian Cyrillic: Љубомир Новаковић; born 16 August 1948) is a Serbian former politician. He took part in Vojvodina's "anti-bureaucratic revolution" in October 1988 and held a high position in the League of Communists of Serbia (SKS) during the country's final years as a one-party socialist state. He later joined the Socialist Party of Serbia (SPS) and was a member of the Serbian parliament from 1991 to 1993. Novaković served as mayor of Bačka Palanka from 1989 to 1997.

== Early life and career ==
Novaković was born in the village of Gornje Crniljevo in Osečina, in what was then the People's Republic of Serbia in the Federal People's Republic of Yugoslavia. He was the president of Bačka Palanka's municipal trade union council in 1988.

== "Anti-Bureaucratic Revolution" and political rise ==
On 5 October 1988, Novaković was the opening speaker at a massive protest rally in Novi Sad against the provincial League of Communists leadership in Vojvodina; although the protest was ostensibly directed against bureaucracy and corruption, it was actually orchestrated by Slobodan Milošević as part of his bid to gain control of Serbia's political institutions. Addressing the crowd, Novaković said, "We came to achieve our goals, and we will not return without that." Subsequently, he was part of a three-member delegation from the protest that negotiated with Milovan Šogorov, the president of the presidium of the provincial SKS. The protest ultimately resulted in the resignation of the provincial leadership, an event that Novaković described as "a historical blow to the bureaucracy" struck by the working class of Vojvodina. The party leadership roles were subsequently filled by Milošević allies.

The "anti-bureaucratic revolution" also led to the resignations of several Vojvodina delegates on the Central Committee of the League of Communists of Serbia. Novaković was elected by the provincial SKS to one of the vacant Central Committee positions in February 1989, and in December of the same year he was re-elected to a full term. He also became president of the Bačka Palanka municipal assembly, a position which was at the time equivalent to mayor, after the 1989 Serbian local elections.

Like most SKS members in Serbia during these years, Novaković supported the territorial integrity of Yugoslavia and opposed secessionist efforts in Slovenia and Croatia. At a SKS meeting in Bačka Palanka in 1988, he called for the working class and communists to hold a rally in Slovenia's capital Ljubljana to hold the republic's political leadership to account and oppose the drift toward the breakup and division of Yugoslavia. His remarks were criticized in the Slovenian media. The following year, he remarked, with some bitterness, "If we had gone to Ljubljana with fifty buses then, not to overthrow the Slovenian leadership, but to explain to the Slovenian people who was tearing Yugoslavia apart, perhaps we would not be in this situation today."

== Socialist Party of Serbia ==
The League of Communists of Serbia merged with the Socialist Alliance of Working People (SSRNJ) in 1990 to create the Socialist Party of Serbia. Novaković joined the new party and was elected to its inaugural Vojvodina provincial executive board in October 1990.

He was elected to the Serbian parliament for Bačka Palanka's first division in the 1990 Serbian parliamentary election. The Socialists won a majority victory in the election, and Novaković served as a supporter of the administration.

Bačka Palanka held a strategically important location in the early period of the 1991–95 Croatian War; the municipality borders on Croatia and is very close to Vukovar, where the most significant battle from the first year of the war took place. In mid-October 1991, Novaković announced that all traffic over the bridge linking Bačka Palanka and Ilok in Croatia had been suspended. He said, "We have information that, on the Ilok side, all three overpasses [...] have been mined. Personally, I believe that the Croatian Ministry of Internal Affairs will not activate these mines, but I could not say that for the Guard." The Yugoslav People's Army (JNA) occupied Ilok shortly thereafter, and the community was part of the Republic of Serbian Krajina (RSK) for the remainder of the war.

Several Serb refugees from Western Slavonia were temporarily housed in Bačka Palanka's sports complex during the early period of the war. In January 1992, Novaković expressed frustration with authorities in Serbia and the RSK for neglecting their fate. In March 1992, he and fellow SPS parliamentarian Ratko Ristić introduced a motion to ban the return of citizens who had left Serbia due to the war. The motion was not supported by the government and did not pass, but it received the votes of eighty assembly members.

Serbia adopted a system of proportional representation for national assembly elections in 1992, and Novaković appeared in the eleventh position on the SPS's electoral list for the Novi Sad constituency in the 1992 Serbian parliamentary election. The party won nine seats in the division, and he did not receive a mandate for a second term. (From 1992 to 2000, Serbia's electoral law stipulated that one-third of parliamentary mandates would be assigned to candidates from successful lists in numerical order, while the remaining two-thirds would be distributed amongst other candidates at the discretion of the sponsoring parties. It was common practice for the latter mandates to be awarded out of order. Novaković could have been chosen for a mandate despite his list position, but this did not happen.) He was, however, confirmed for new terms as mayor of Bačka Palanka following the May 1992 Serbian local elections and the December 1992 Serbian local elections.

In November 1994, he said that Bačka Palanka was housing just over six thousand refugees, many of whom would need to be settled elsewhere.

Novaković's term as mayor of Bačka Palanka ended soon after the 1996 Serbian local elections. In 1998, he testified at the International Criminal Tribunal for the Former Yugoslavia (ICTY) about Bačka Palanka's relations with Ilok during the early period of the Croatian War.

== Electoral record ==
=== National Assembly of Serbia ===
1990 Serbian parliamentary election: Bačka Palanka I
Candidate	Party	First round		Second round	
Candidate	Party	Votes	%	Votes	%
Ljubomir Novaković	Socialist Party of Serbia		44.60		53.39
Borislav Milošević	Serbian Renewal Movement		27.26		defeated
Zdravko Marjanović	Union of Reform Forces of Yugoslavia for Vojvodina– Association for the Yugoslav Democratic Initiative		defeated		
Dr. Ružica Nikolić	Serbian National Renewal		defeated		
Janićije Coja Radović	People's Radical Party		defeated		
Total					
Source: Marjanović, Nikolić, and Radović are listed alphabetically.
