= Milivoje Đurković =

Serbian politician (born 1936)

Milivoje Đurković (Serbian Cyrillic: Миливоје Ђурковић; born 1936) is a Kosovo Serb politician. He was the mayor of Dečani in the 1990s and served in the National Assembly of Serbia from 1997 to 2001. During his political career, Đurković was a member of the Socialist Party of Serbia (SPS).

== Private career ==
Đurković has worked as a salesperson.

== Politician ==
=== Mayor of Dečani ===
Relations between Kosovo's Serb and Albanian communities were generally very poor in the 1990s, and most of the Albanian community boycotted Serbia's political institutions in favour of their own parallel structures. The population of Dečani in the 1990s was predominantly Albanian.

Đurković was appointed by the Serbian government as president of the Dečani municipal council after the May 1992 Serbian local elections. He continued serving in the role after the December 1992 Serbian local elections. In August 1996, he said that unknown individuals had used explosive devices to target a housing complex in the village of Babaloć for Serb and Montenegrin refugees from Albania.

The Socialist Party of Serbia won an overwhelming victory in Dečani in the 1996 local elections, and Đurković was chosen afterward as the municipality's mayor.

Forces of the Kosovo Liberation Army (KLA) took control of much of Dečani in the early period of the Kosovo War. In April 1998, Đurković said that by Serb villagers in remote areas were leaving their homes and moving nearer the town. The following month, he told the media, "with the exception of the town itself, all the surrounding area is held by increasingly aggressive terrorists." In March 1999, just before the NATO bombing of Yugoslavia, he said that the region had returned to a state of relative calm.

Serbia lost control over Dečani after the Kosovo War, and almost all of the area's Serbs fled the area.

Đurković was for time placed on a list of persons who could not obtain visas for European Union (EU) countries. This occurred during a period of broader sanctions against the regime of Yugoslavian president and SPS leader Slobodan Milošević.

=== Parliamentarian (1997–2001) ===
Đurković appeared in the fourteenth position (out of fourteen) on the Socialist Party's electoral list for the Peć division in the 1997 Serbian parliamentary election. From 1992 to 2000, Serbia's electoral law stipulated that one-third of parliamentary mandates would be assigned to candidates on successful lists in numerical order, with the remaining two-thirds distributed to other candidates at the discretion of the sponsoring parties or coalitions. The Socialist Party won twelve seats in the division, and Đurković was assigned one of the "optional" mandates. The Socialist Party won the election and afterward formed a coalition government with the far-right Serbian Radical Party (SRS) and the Yugoslav Left (JUL), and Đurković served as a government supporter.

SPS leader Slobodan Milošević fell from power in October 2000, and a new Serbian parliamentary election was held in December of that year. Đurković was not a candidate, and his term ended when the new assembly convened in early 2001.
