= Civic Movement for Subotica – Doves of Subotica =

Political party in Serbia

The Civic Movement for Subotica – Doves of Subotica (Serbian: грађански покрет за Суботицу – Голубови Суботице, romanized: Građanski pokret za Suboticu – Golubovi Subotice) was a Serbian political party that existed from 1992 to 1996, during which time it won representation in the Vojvodina provincial assembly and the Subotica city assembly.

The party was restructured in 1996 as the Alliance of Citizens of Subotica (Serbian: Савеза грађана Суботице, romanized: Saveza građana Subotice; abbr. SGS) and played a prominent role in Subotica's local government from 1997 to 1999. The party lost its assembly representation in the 2000 local elections and seems to have dissolved by the 2004 elections.

The party's most prominent figures included Mirko Bajić and Slavko Parać.

== Doves of Subotica ==
=== May 1992 elections ===
The Doves of Subotica fielded eight candidates in the May 1992 Vojvodina provincial election and thirty-three candidates in the concurrent Subotica local elections. The party's platform called for Subotica to remain a multi-ethnic city with peace and security guaranteed for its different communities. It also supported parliamentary democracy, stronger local governments, increased privatization in agriculture and industry, and the autonomy of Vojvodina within Serbia. Its slogan was, "People come first, not nationality."

The Doves of Serbia's coordinator in this period was Lazar Brčić Kostić, who indicated that the party had turned down offers of cooperation with the Socialist Party of Serbia (SPS), the Democratic Fellowship of Vojvodina Hungarians (VMDK), and the Democratic Alliance of Croats in Vojvodina (DSHV). After the first round of voting in the local election, Brčić Kostić expressed regret that most Subotica residents had voted along communal lines, adding that the Doves would work to provide a balance between the SPS and the VMDK–DSHV alliance in the incoming city assembly.

One Doves of Subotica candidate was elected to the provincial assembly: József Palencsár, who was elected for the city's first division in the first round of voting. The SPS won a majority victory overall. Five candidates of the Doves, including Mirko Bajić, were elected to the Subotica city assembly in the local vote. When the new city assembly convened, the VMDK and DSHV formed a coalition government; the Doves described the new local administration as an "unfortunate coalition" of nationalist parties and criticized them for not sharing power more broadly.

=== December 1992 elections and after ===
The May 1992 elections were boycotted by most of Serbia's leading opposition parties and were widely seen as lacking legitimacy. New elections were ultimately held in December 1992, this time with the participation of the opposition.

For the December 1992 Vojvodina provincial election and the December 1992 Subotica elections, the Doves of Subotica joined a multi-party opposition coalition with the Democratic Movement of Serbia (DEPOS), the Democratic Party (DS), the Reform Democratic Party of Vojvodina (RDSV), and the League of Social Democrats of Vojvodina (LSV). The coalition won three of Subotica's nine seats at the provincial level. József Palencsár was re-elected for the city's first division, although it is unclear if he was still a member of the Doves at this time; his endorsement seems to have been from the RDSV. At the local level, the coalition won four seats out of sixty-seven. Among the candidates elected were Mirko Bajić and Ilija Šujica, who was elected with a dual endorsement from the coalition and a citizens' group. The VMDK-DSHV coalition won an increased victory in the city overall. Šujica, an ethnic Serb, was appointed as a deputy mayor of the Subotica in May 1994, in a bid to ensure the Serb community's inclusion in the local administration.

Mirko Bajić was recognized as the party's leader by 1995 if not sooner. On 27 January of that year, Bajić and New Democracy (ND) leader Dušan Mihajlović signed a protocol for cooperation between their parties. In late 1995, the Doves of Subotica endorsed the Manifesto for an Autonomous Vojvodina.

== Alliance of Citizens of Subotica ==
The Doves of Subotica dissolved on 5 April 1996 and was succeeded by the Alliance of Citizens of Subotica, a more traditionally structured political party. Slavko Parać, who was chosen as the party's first leader, said that the change was made "to win the majority in the municipal assembly [...] or, at the very least, to have so many supporters that without them decisions cannot be made that are of interest to all citizens."

The SGS won six seats in the 1996 Subotica local elections. The elections did not produce a clear winner overall: the Alliance of Vojvodina Hungarians (VMSZ) won the greatest number of seats but was required to share power with rival parties. When the new local assembly convened on 3 January 1997, incumbent mayor József Kasza of the VMSZ was confirmed for a new term in office, while Veselin Avdalović of the Socialist Party of Serbia and Mirko Bajić of the SGS were both chosen as deputy mayors. Later in the year, the SGS took credit for improving the work of the local government by requiring the VMSZ and SPS to negotiate with each other on local issues.

The SGS maintained a working relationship with other Vojvodina autonomist parties in this period and was a founding member of the Vojvodina Coalition. The party did not, however, contest the 1997 Serbian parliamentary election at part of this group but instead ran its own electoral list in the Subotica division. The list fared poorly, falling well below the electoral threshold.

Ilija Šujica was described as the SGS's interim leader in a 1998 news report. Mirko Bajić left the SGS to join the Democratic Party in late 1999.

Klara Kodžoman Pejić was chosen as the SGS's new leader on 30 June 2000. The party contested the 2000 Yugoslavian parliamentary election in the Subotica division in an alliance with the "Vojvodina Opposition," and their list again fell below the electoral threshold. In the concurrent 2000 Subotica local election, the SGS ran in an alliance with the Vojvodina Opposition and the Reformists of Vojvodina (RV) and did not win any seats.

The party remained active until at least 2003, when it unsuccessfully contested a by-election for the Subotica city assembly. It did not contest the 2004 local election in Subotica and appears to have dissolved before this time.
