= Bogoljub Janićević =

Serbian politician

Bogoljub Janićević (Serbian Cyrillic: Богољуб Јанићевић; born 18 August 1951) (Note: Janićević's name is misspelled in some official documents as Bogoljub Janićijević. See for instance Službeni Glasnik (Republike Srbije), Volume 49 Number 7 (25 January 1993), pp. 193-194, which includes a list of all parliamentarians elected in the 1992 Serbian general election.) is a Serbian retired police official and politician. He served in the Serbian parliament from 1993 to 2001 and was the mayor of Štrpce from 1992 to 1995. During his political career, Janićević was a member of the Socialist Party of Serbia (SPS).

He was involved in planning the 15 January 1999 operation by Serbian security forces in Račak, which led to the events widely known as the Račak massacre. Janićević contends that the Račak operation was an anti-terrorist initiative targeting members of the Kosovo Liberation Army (KLA) and that no massacre took place.

== Early life and career ==
Janićević was born in the village of Berevce in the municipality of Štrpce, in what was then the Autonomous Region of Kosovo and Metohija in the People's Republic of Serbia, Federal People's Republic of Yugoslavia. He graduated from the University of Priština Faculty of Law and, after a brief stint as an intern at the Supreme Administrative Court in Priština, worked as a police officer, inspector, and administrator at the police department in Uroševac from 1972 to 1992, standing down when he became the mayor of Štrpce. He was appointed as head of the Uroševac police force on 15 June 1995 and held this role until 15 April 1999, when he became head of the police for Priština. He was forced to leave Kosovo the conclusion of the 1998–99 Kosovo War and resettled in Niš. He retired from the Serbian police on 31 December 2004 with the rank of colonel.

== Politician ==
During the 1990s, Serbian political life was dominated by the authoritarian rule of Slobodan Milošević, leader of the SPS. In Kosovo, the majority Albanian community largely boycotted Serbian state institutions between 1990 and 1999.

=== Mayor of Štrpce ===
Janićević was elected to the Štrpce municipal assembly in the May 1992 Serbian local elections and was chosen afterward as assembly president, a position that was then equivalent to mayor. He was re-elected to the assembly in the December 1992 local elections and was confirmed afterward for a second mayoral term. He stood down on 15 June 1995, when he returned to active service in the police force.

=== Parliamentarian ===
Janićević received the eleventh position on the Socialist Party's electoral list for the Priština division in the 1992 Serbian parliamentary election, which took place concurrently with the December 1992 local vote. The list won thirteen seats, and he was assigned a mandate, taking his seat when the national assembly convened in January 1993. (Between 1992 and 2000, one-third of the mandates in Serbian parliamentary elections were assigned to candidates on successful lists in numerical order, while the remaining two-thirds were assigned to other candidates at the discretion of the sponsoring parties or coalitions. Janićević was not automatically elected by virtue of his list position but received a mandate all the same.) In the assembly, he served on the defence and security committee. The Socialists won a plurality victory overall and initially governed with unofficial support from the far-right Serbian Radical Party (SRS).

The Socialist–Radical alliance broke down later in 1993, and a new Serbian parliamentary election was called for December of that year. This time, Janićević appeared in the sixteenth position on the SPS list for Priština and was again assigned a mandate when the Socialists won twenty-one out of twenty-four seats in the division. He again served on the defence and security committee. The Socialists won 123 out of 250 seats in total and afterward secured a majority through an alliance with the small New Democracy (ND) party.

The Socialist Party contested the 1997 Serbian parliamentary election in an alliance with the Yugoslav Left (JUL) and New Democracy. Janićević was given the fifth position on the alliance's list for the smaller, redistributed Priština division and received a mandate for a third term after the list won seven seats. The Socialist Party's alliance won a reduced victory overall, and the SPS and JUL formed a new coalition government with the Radicals.

Slobodan Milošević was defeated in the 2000 Yugoslavian presidential election and fell from power on 5 October 2000. The Serbian government also fell after Milošević's defeat, and a new Serbian parliamentary election took place in December 2000. Prior to the vote, Serbia's electoral laws were reformed so that the entire country became a single at-large division and all mandates were assigned to candidates on successful lists at the discretion of the sponsoring parties or coalitions, irrespective of numerical order. Janićević appeared in the seventy-second position on the Socialist Party's list, which was mostly alphabetical. The list won thirty-seven seats, and he did not receive a mandate for a new term; his parliamentary tenure ended when the new assembly met in January 2001.

Janićević later appeared in the ninety-second position on the SPS's list for the 2003 Serbian parliamentary election. The Socialists won twenty-two seats, and he was again not included in his party's delegation.

== Račak ==
Janićević took part in the planning of the Račak operation carried out by Serbian police on 15 January 1999. He was not present in Račak during the operation and did not participate in the violence; he was instead stationed in nearby Štimlje and received updates by a radio transmitter.

In late 2005, at the trial of Slobodan Milošević, Janićević testified that the Račak operation was carried out in response to terrorist activities directed from a KLA base in the village and that Serbian forces killed only KLA members, not innocent civilians, during the operation. He also stated that the operation was carried out exclusively by Serbian police, without support from the Yugoslav Army, and that members of the OSCE Kosovo Verification Mission had a clear view of the entire operation as it unfolded.

Janićević later co-authored a book on the subject entitled, Račak, Potpuna Istina (English: Račak, the Complete Truth). He reiterated his views on the events at Račak in a round table discussion called Truth Dies Harder Than People – Račak, convened by Serbia's University of Defence in December 2019.
