= Predrag Amižić =

Serbian politician (born 1960)

Predrag Amižić (Serbian Cyrillic: Предраг Амижић; born 5 September 1960) is a Serbian politician. He was the mayor of Žitište from 1992 to 2001 and a member of the Vojvodina provincial assembly from 2012 to 2016. He currently serves in the Žitište municipal assembly. Amižić is a member of the Socialist Party of Serbia (SPS).

== Private career ==
Before becoming mayor of Žitište, Amižić served as director of the Ekos utility company in the community. He later served as director of the meat production company Agroživ in Zrenjanin.

== Politician ==
Amižić was a member of the League of Communists of Serbia (SKS) when Yugoslavia was a one-party socialist state, serving as secretary of the presidency for the party's municipal board in Žitište. In July 1990, he voted for the party's transformation into the Socialist Party of Serbia (SPS).

Over the next decade, Serbia's political culture was dominated by the authoritarian rule of Serbian president Slobodan Milošević, the leader of the SPS.

=== Mayor of Źitište (1990–2001) ===
The Socialist Party won a landslide majority victory in Žitište in the May 1992 Serbian local elections with twenty-five out of thirty-one seats, due in part to a boycott by several of Serbia's leading opposition parties. When the municipal assembly convened on 29 June 1992, Amižić was chosen as assembly president, a position that was at the time equivalent to mayor. By virtue of serving in this role, he also became president of the assembly's executive council.

Due to ongoing skepticism about the legitimacy of the May vote, a new round of local elections was called for December 1992. The opposition parties participated in the vote, and the Socialists won a reduced majority in Žitište with sixteen seats. Amižić was chosen for a second term as mayor and executive council president when the new assembly convened on 18 January 1993.

Amižić appeared in the thirteenth position on the Socialist Party's electoral list for the Zrenjanin division in the 1993 Serbian parliamentary election. The party won ten seats in the division, and he was not given a mandate. (From 1992 to 2000, Serbia's electoral law stipulated that one-third of parliamentary mandates would be assigned to candidates from successful lists in numerical order, while the remaining two-thirds would be distributed amongst other candidates at the discretion of the sponsoring parties. Amižić could have been given a mandate despite his list position, but this did not happen.)

The Socialist Party won an increased victory in Žitište with seventeen seats in the 1996 Serbian local elections; a further five seats were won by its ally, the Yugoslav Left (JUL). Amižić was chosen for a third term as mayor on 11 December 1996; by this time, the offices of mayor and executive council president had been separated.

Slobodan Milošević was defeated in the 2000 Yugoslavian presidential election and subsequently fell from power on 5 October 2000, a watershed moment in Serbian politics. The 2000 local election in Žitište, held concurrently with the Yugoslavian vote, had an unclear outcome. Officially, the Socialist–Yugoslav Left alliance won seventeen seats, the Democratic Opposition of Serbia (DOS) won thirteen, and one seat went to an independent candidate who later joined the DOS. Three of the SPS–JUL mandates were challenged in court, however, and the matter was still unresolved on 23 November 2000 when Amižić convened a meeting of the assembly to affirm the disputed mandates. The newly constituted assembly, which the DOS rejected as illegitimate, then chose Amižić for another term as mayor.

Subsequent efforts to resolve the situation were unsuccessful, and on 17 April 2001 Amižić submitted his resignation as mayor. On 9 May, the Serbian government introduced an interim administration pending a new local election later in the year. The opposition parties won nineteen seats in the 2001 vote, while the SPS won twelve; a new local administration without the SPS was formed on 28 November 2001.

=== From 2001 to 2012 ===
Serbia introduced a system of proportional representation for local elections in advance of the 2004 cycle. No party came close to winning a majority in Žitište in 2004; the far-right Serbian Radical Party (SRS) won a plurality victory with seven seats out of thirty-one, while the Socialists finished second with five seats. The SRS and SPS afterward formed a coalition government with other parties; Amižić was re-elected to the assembly but did not return to an executive role, serving as a supporter of the administration.

Amižić was the Socialist Party's candidate for the Žitište division in the 2008 Vojvodina provincial election and finished third. He also appeared in the second position on the SPS's list for Žitište in the concurrent 2012 Serbian local elections; the list won three seats, but he did not take a mandate this time.

=== Provincial representative (2012–16) ===
Serbia's electoral laws were reformed again in 2011, such that all mandates in elections held under proportional representation were assigned in numerical order. Amižić appeared in the twelfth position on the SPS's coalition list in the 2012 Vojvodina provincial election, the last to be held under a system of mixed proportional representation, and was not immediately elected when the list won nine seats. Due to the departure of other candidates further up the list, however, he received a mandate in the provincial assembly on 25 October 2012. The Democratic Party (DS) was the dominant party in Vojvodina's coalition government in this period, and the Socialists served in opposition. During his provincial assembly term, Amižić was a member of the committee for the organization of administration and local self-government.

Amižić also led the Socialist Party's coalition list for Žitište in the 2012 Serbian local elections, which were held concurrently with the provincial vote, and was re-elected to the municipal assembly when the list won eight seats.

He did not seek re-election at either the provincial or municipal level in 2016.

=== Since 2020 ===
Amižić appeared in the fourth position on the SPS's coalition list for Žitište in the 2020 Serbian local elections and was again elected to the municipal assembly when the list won six seats. He led the SPS–United Serbia (JS) assembly group in the term that followed.

The Socialist Party joined a multi-party coalition led by the Serbian Progressive Party (SNS) for the 2024 Serbian local elections. Amižić appeared in the second position on the coalition's list in Žitište and was re-elected when the list won a majority victory with twenty-one out of thirty-one seats.

== Electoral record ==
=== Provincial (Vojvodina) ===
2008 Vojvodina provincial election: Žitište
Candidate	Party	First round		Second round	
Candidate	Party	Votes	%	Votes	%
Zoran Babić	"For a European Vojvodina, Democratic Party–G17 Plus, Boris Tadić"	2,171	21.07	3,717	50.23
Zoran Sandić	Democratic Party of Serbia–New Serbia–Dr. Vojislav Koštunica (Affiliation: Democratic Party of Serbia)	2,143	20.80	3,683	49.77
Predrag Amižić	Socialist Party of Serbia (SPS)–Party of United Pensioners of Serbia (PUPS) (Affiliation: Socialist Party of Serbia)	1,686	16.36		
Daniel Petrović	Together for Vojvodina–Nenad Čanak (Affiliation: League of Social Democrats of Vojvodina)	1,593	15.46		
Borivoje Stevanović	Serbian Radical Party	1,158	11.24		
Jaroslav Tomić	Hungarian Coalition–István Pásztor	1,011	9.81		
Milan Majkić Mišo	Liberal Democratic Party	439	4.26		
Spasoje Šuvački	Citizens' Group: Union of War Veterans 90 – TIH	102	0.99		
Total		10,303	100.00	7,400	100.00
Valid votes		10,303	95.04	7,400	96.76
Invalid/blank votes		538	4.96	248	3.24
Total votes		10,841	100.00	7,648	100.00
