= Mustafa Džigal =

Serbian politician

- Мустафа Џигал

Member of the Chamber of Citizens in the Assembly of the Federal Republic of Yugoslavia
- In office 16 August 1999 – 7 October 2000

Personal details
- Born: 1950
- Died: 2014 (aged 63–64)
- Party: JUL

Mustafa Džigal (Serbian Cyrillic: Мустафа Џигал; 1950 – 2014) was a Serbian politician from the country's ethnic Muslim community. He was the deputy mayor of Sjenica from 1992 to 1996, an assistant minister in the Serbian government from 1997 to 2000, and a member of the Yugoslavian parliament from 1999 to 2000. Džigal was a high-ranking member of the Yugoslav Left (JUL) in the late 1990s.

He is not to be confused with a different Mustafa Džigal, also from the Sjenica municipality, who was known for seeking legal redress for torture he experienced at the hands of Serbian police in 1994.

== Private career ==
Džigal was from a prominent family in the Sjenica area, in Serbia's Sandžak region. He was a graduated economist.

== Politician ==
During the 1990s, Serbian political life was dominated by the authoritarian rule of Slobodan Milošević, leader of the Socialist Party of Serbia (SPS). There was a widespread boycott of Serbian state institutions by Sandžak-area Muslims in the early 1990s, particularly after the beginning of the Bosnian War in 1992.

=== Deputy Mayor ===
The May 1992 Serbian local elections did not produce a viable municipal authority in Sjenica due to the boycott, and on 8 October 1992 the Serbian government appointed a council to govern the municipality. The council's president was Radoslav Rakonjac of the Socialists; Džigal served as vice-president, a position that was equivalent to deputy mayor. He remained in this role until the establishment of a new municipal government following the 1996 Serbian local elections, by which time the Bosnian War was over and the boycott had ended.

In the same month that Džigal was appointed as council vice-president, he also founded an organization called the Movement for Peace and Harmony of Serbs and Muslims, which was intended to maintain the peace in Sjenica and the surrounding areas. In a 1994 interview, Džigal pointed to historically good relations between the two communities and looked forward to Serbs and Muslims living together in peace when the "great tragedy" of the Bosnian conflict was over. He also spoke against secessionist tendencies in the Sandžak, saying, "We believe that in today's Yugoslavia, all citizens, including Muslims, will be safe, and that they will be guaranteed personal and property security."

=== Yugoslav Left official ===
Džigal joined the Yugoslav Left on or shortly after its founding in 1994 and was elected to its directorate in March 1995. In July 1996, he led a party forum discussion in Nova Varoš on relations between Serbs, Muslims, and other citizens; in his opening speech, he said, "People in these areas have realized that mono-national parties lead to nationalism, to regression, and therefore they welcomed with relief a movement in which there is a place for every well-intentioned citizen."

The Yugoslav Left contested the 1996 Yugoslavian parliamentary election in an alliance with the Socialist Party and New Democracy (ND). Džigal appeared in the third position out of four on the alliance's electoral list for the Chamber of Citizens in the Užice division; the list won two seats, and he was not immediately elected. (Under Yugoslavia's electoral law, only the first of the two SPS–JUL–ND mandates in Užice was automatically assigned in numerical order; the other mandate was assigned at the alliance's discretion to another candidate on the list. Lead candidate Milisav Čutović of the Yugoslav Left was automatically elected, and the "optional" mandate was given to fourth-ranked candidate Miroslav Stefanović of New Democracy.) The SPS–JUL–ND alliance and its Montenegrin allies won a majority victory overall in the assembly.

During the 1997 Serbian parliamentary election (in which he was not a candidate), Džigal said, "The fate of Serbs and Muslims is common and indivisible. It cannot be decided by [...] mono-national parties, especially not those with a nationalist character." He was elected to the main board of the Yugoslav Left in July 1998.

=== Assistant Minister in the Serbian Government ===
Džigal was appointed in 1997 as assistant minister for local self-government, working with JUL minister Zoran Modrinić in a government dominated by the SPS.

A new coalition government comprising the SPS, the JUL, and the far-right Serbian Radical Party (SRS) took office in early 1998. Džigal was re-assigned at this time as assistant minister of mining and energy.

At the beginning of the NATO bombing of Yugoslavia in March 1999, Džigal said that the Kosovo War was being fought for the interests of "foreign mercenaries" and the United States of America. He added, "we will defend Serbia and Yugoslavia by force."

=== Yugoslavian parliamentarian ===
By August 1999, New Democracy's alliance with the Socialist Party and the Yugoslav Left had irrevocably broken down, and the three sitting members of New Democracy in the Chamber of Citizens had their mandates revoked. In Užice, Džigal was awarded a mandate in place of Stefanović. He served as a supporter of the administration.

Slobodan Milošević was defeated in the 2000 Yugoslavian presidential election and fell from power on 5 October 2000. Džigal was not a candidate in the 2000 Yugoslavian parliamentary election, which took place concurrently with the presidential vote, and his term in the Chamber of Citizens ended at around the same time. Serbia's government also fell following the Yugoslavian vote, and Džigal's tenure as an assistant minister ended as well.

== Death ==
Džigal died in 2014.
