= Zoran Grujić =

Kosovo Serb politician

Zoran Grujić (Serbian Cyrillic: Зоран Грујић; born 5 February 1942) is a Kosovo Serb former politician. A prominent figure in the rise of Serb nationalism in Kosovo during the 1980s, he served in the Serbian parliament from 1993 to 1997 and also held high municipal office in Kosovo Polje. He was a member of the Socialist Party of Serbia (SPS) during his time as an elected official, although his relationship with the party hierarchy was sometimes difficult.

== Early life and career ==
Grujić was born to a Serb family in the village of Bresje in Kosovo Polje, which had been annexed the previous year into the Kingdom of Albania within the Italian Empire. He was raised in the community after the end of World War II, at which time it was part of the Autonomous Region of Kosovo and Metohija in the People's Republic of Serbia, Federal People's Republic of Yugoslavia.

He received a bachelor's degree from the University of Belgrade Faculty of Agriculture in 1965, a master's degree from the University of Skopje Faculty of Economics in 1976, and a Ph.D. in 1985. He taught at the University of Priština in the 1980s and was director of the agricultural institute Kosovo Polje.

== Activism ==
Relations between the Serb and Albanian communities of Kosovo, which were not particularly good before the 1980s, took a significant turn for the worse following the 1981 Albanian protests in the province. In the aftermath of the protests, a group of Serb political dissidents in Kosovo Polje began holding public meetings to discuss the problem of Serb emigration from Kosovo, as well as what they perceived as an increasing Albanisation of the province and the apathy of Serbia's political class to this development. Grujić became a member of the group's leadership in 1985. Initially, their discussions took place within the framework of officially permitted dissent in the Socialist Federal Republic of Yugoslavia (SFRY). One of the group's leaders later said that they developed a strategy in May 1985 "to awaken national consciousness, so that it would be heard that there were still Serbs and Montenegrins [in Kosovo] and that they would not leave [the province] to the Albanian secessionists at any cost."

In April 1987, Grujić played a perhaps unintentional role in helping to facilitate Slobodan Milošević's rise to power in Serbia. In this period, Grujić said that he had been interrogated by police because of his links to the Kosovo Polje dissidents and was facing discrimination at the University of Priština because he was a Serb. Members of the activist community spread a rumour that he was leaving Kosovo due to the pressure he was facing; the rumour was not true, but it galvanized the local Serb community and led the activists to invite Milošević to make an unscheduled stop in Kosovo Polje during his tour of the province. In the course of his visit, a confrontation took place between a predominantly Albanian police force and Serb demonstrators, at which time Milošević addressed the demonstrators by saying, "No one has the right to beat you" (Niko ne sme da vas bije!). This is now recognized as an iconic moment in Serbian politics and is widely considered as an important moment in both Milošević's consolidation of political authority and a broader rise in Serbian nationalism.

In the summer of 1988, Grujić was part of an organizing committee for protest gatherings of Kosovo Serbs and Montenegrins outside of the province. In July of that year, he spoke at a Kosovo Polje rally in support of the [pro-Milošević] Central Committee of the League of Communists of Serbia (SKS) and against the [anti-Milošević] political leadership in Vojvodina, whom he accused of ignoring "hundreds of attacks on Serbs and Montenegrins by Albanian separatists." Three months after the rally, a supposed "anti-bureaucratic revolution" in Vojvodina brought Milošević's supporters to power in that province.

== Politician ==
=== Local politics in Kosovo Polje ===
Grujić declined a nomination to the SKS municipal committee in Kosovo Polje in February 1989. Following the 1989 Serbian local elections, he was chosen as president of the municipal assembly's executive committee, effectively making him the first minister of the local administration. At a May 1990 assembly meeting, he clashed with the municipality's Albanian mayor, Jetullah Sopjani, on the issue of the security of the local Serb and Montenegrin communities. Not long after this meeting, most Kosovo Albanians began participating in a boycott of Serbian political institutions that lasted until the end of the Kosovo War in 1999.

In July 1990, the League of Communists of Serbia merged with the Socialist Alliance of Working People (SSRN) of Serbia to become the Socialist Party of Serbia, while the country shifted from one-party socialist rule to (nominal) multi-party democracy. In practice, SPS leader Slobodan Milošević and his allies dominated the Serbian political scene over the next decade.

Grujić became a member of the Socialist Party, although in October 1990 he declined a nomination to its main board for the Autonomous Province of Kosovo and Metohija (as the province had recently been renamed). The Socialist Party's organization in Kosovo Polje was extremely divided during this period, and Grujić was frequently accused of being a leading source of the divisions. This notwithstanding, he was appointed to a second term as executive committee president after the Socialists won a landslide majority victory in Kosovo Polje in the May 1992 local elections.

=== Parliamentarian ===
Grujić appeared in the third position on the Socialist Party's electoral list for the Priština division in the 1992 Serbian parliamentary election and was elected when the list won thirteen seats. (Between 1992 and 2000, one-third of the mandates in Serbian parliamentary elections were assigned to candidates on successful lists in numerical order, while the remaining two-thirds were assigned to other candidates at the discretion of the sponsoring parties or coalitions. Grujić was automatically elected by virtue of his list position.) He took his seat when the assembly convened in January 1993 and served on the committee for development and economic relations with foreign countries. The Socialist Party won a plurality victory overall and initially governed with informal support from the far-right Serbian Radical Party (SRS).

Although the Socialist Party won another landslide victory in Kosovo Polje in the December 1992 Serbian local elections (which took place concurrently with the parliamentary vote), the ongoing divisions in the local party organization initially prevented the formation of a new municipal government. Grujić was openly critical of the way in which SPS leaders intervened to end the standoff, and when a government was finally formed in summer 1993 he was widely perceived as having been pushed out of a municipal leadership position. Grujić was reported to have submitted his written resignation as a member of parliament to Zoran Anđelković, the leader of the Socialist Party's national assembly group, in July 1993. It does not appear as though his resignation was accepted by the assembly; it may not have even been forwarded.

In any event, the Socialist–Radical alliance broke down in 1993, a new parliamentary election took place in December of that year, and Grujić again appeared in the third position on the Socialist Party's list for the Priština division. He was re-elected when the Socialists won a landslide victory in the division with twenty-one out of twenty-four seats. He again served on the development committee for the term that followed. The Socialists won a strong plurality victory overall and formed a new government with support from the small New Democracy (ND) party.

Grujić delivered a speech in April 1995 that called for, among other things, a definitive end to Kosovo's status as a province, abolishing laws from 1945 that prevented the return of Serbs who fled in 1941, mechanisms to prevent the Albanisation of Kosovo, and a program to assist the return of Serbs to Kosovo. The speech won support from Kosovo Serb intellectuals who were seeking the establishment of a Serb National Council for the province.

He was not a candidate in the 1997 Serbian parliamentary election, and his national assembly term ended in that year.

=== After 1997 ===
Serbia lost effective control over most of Kosovo after the 1998—99 Kosovo War and the 1999 NATO bombing of Yugoslavia, and a large percentage of the Serb population fled the province. In the immediate aftermath of the conflict, Grujić oversaw Serb refugees quarters in Kruševac. Later in the year, he met with United Nations Interim Administration Mission in Kosovo (UNMIK) leader Bernard Kouchner and Kosovo Force (KFOR) head Mike Jackson as a representative of Kosovo Polje Serbs. During the meeting, he referenced UNMIK/KFOR's reported success in returning 80,000 Albanian refugees to Kosovo in eight days and provocatively asked if they would also return 300,000 expelled Serbs in fifteen days.

Unlike many pre-war Serb leaders in Kosovo, Grujić continued to reside in the province after the conflict. In July 1999, he was chosen as leader of the Serbian Democratic Council, which pledged to work in tandem with Oliver Ivanović's Serbian National Council of North Kosovo and Metohija. He urged the Serb community to boycott the 2001 Kosovan parliamentary election organized by UNMIK and the OSCE Mission in Kosovo. Later, he spoke to the Serbian media about the 2004 anti-Serb riots in Kosovo.
