= Slovaks Forward =

Political party in Serbia

Slovaks Forward Словаци напред Slovaci napred Slováci vpred
- Abbreviation: SV/SN
- President: Pavel Surovi
- Founded: 2015
- Ideology: Slovak minority interests
- Colours: Light blue
- National Assembly: 0 / 250
- Assembly of Vojvodina: 1 / 120

Slovaks Forward (Slovak: Slováci vpred, abbr. SV; Serbian: Словаци напред, romanised: Slovaci napred, abbr. SN) is a political party in Serbia, representing the Slovak ethnic minority in Vojvodina. Its leader is Pavel Surovi. The party is aligned with Aleksandar Vučić and the Serbian Progressive Party.

== Slovak National Council ==
Slovaks Forward won nine out of twenty-nine seats in Serbia's 2014 Slovak National Council election and eight seats in the 2018 election. Surovi was chosen as council vice-president after the 2018 election, although he was removed from this role in February 2021.

== Vojvodina provincial politics ==
Slovaks Forward was registered as a political party in late 2015. It joined the Serbian Progressive Party's electoral alliance for the 2016 Vojvodina provincial election; Surovi was included on the Progressive Party's electoral list in the thirty-third position and was elected when the list won a majority victory with sixty-three out of 120 mandates. He was promoted to the fifteenth position on the Progressive list in the 2020 provincial election and was re-elected when the list won an increased majority with seventy-six mandates. As of 2021, Surovi is the sole representative of his party in the assembly. He sits in caucus with the Progressive Party's Aleksandar Vučić – For Our Children parliamentary group.

Surovi was confirmed for a new term as party leader in December 2019.
