= December 1992 Vojvodina provincial election =

Local election in Croatia

The Serbian province of Vojvodina held a provincial election on 20 December 1992. The election took place concurrently with the 1992 Serbian presidential and parliamentary elections, the December 1992 Yugoslavian parliamentary election, and the December 1992 Serbian local elections.

The election was called due to ongoing skepticism about the legitimacy of the previous May 1992 Vojvodina provincial election, which had been boycotted by several leading opposition parties.

This was the second provincial election held in Vojvodina while Serbia was a constituent member of the Federal Republic of Yugoslavia. It took place during the authoritarian rule of Socialist Party of Serbia (SPS) leader Slobodan Milošević and his allies, and against the backdrop of wars in Croatia and Bosnia.

All 120 members of the provincial assembly were elected for single-member constituencies. Unlike the previous election, which was held under a two-round system of runoff balloting, the December 1992 provincial election was held under first-past-the-post rules. This proved to be a short-lived experiment, and runoff voting was re-introduced for the 1996 Vojvodina provincial election.

The result was a dramatically reduced victory for the Socialist Party of Serbia, which lost about half its assembly representation and fell below majority status. The Socialists nonetheless remained in power for the full term of the assembly, initially with support from the Serbian Radical Party and later, after a split between the Socialists and the Radicals at the republic level, with the cooperation from some delegates who had been elected as members of the Reform Democratic Party of Vojvodina. There were several attempts to defeat the government in the assembly, but none were successful.

== Results ==
Party	Seats
Socialist Party of Serbia	50
Democratic opposition parties (combined representation)	40
Democratic Fellowship of Vojvodina Hungarians	17
Serbian Radical Party	6
Citizens' Group candidates	5
Democratic Alliance of Croats in Vojvodina	1
Serb Democratic Party	1
Total	120

== Democratic opposition delegates ==
The leading parties of Serbia's Democratic opposition (i.e., Democratic Party, the Reform Democratic Party of Vojvodina, and the parties of the Democratic Movement of Serbia coalition) formed a variety of electoral alliances across different constituencies.

The parties and alliances that won representation in the assembly can be broken down as follows:

- Democratic Movement of Serbia–Democratic Party–Reform Democratic Party of Vojvodina: 15
- Democratic Movement of Serbia: 11
- Democratic Movement of Serbia–Democratic Party–Reform Democratic Party of Vojvodina–League of Social Democrats of Vojvodina–Doves of Subotica: 3
- "Democratic Coalition" (Zrenjanin): 3
- Democratic Movement of Serbia–Democratic Party: 2
- "Democratic Alliance" (Kikinda): 2
- Democratic Movement of Serbia–Democratic Party–Reform Democratic Party of Vojvodina–People's Party–People's Peasant Party: 1
- Democratic Movement of Serbia–Democratic Party–People's Party–People's Peasant Party: 1
- Reform Democratic Party of Vojvodina: 1
- Reform Democratic Party of Vojvodina–Democratic Fellowship of Vojvodina Hungarians: 1

Excluding the three "Democratic Coalition" members from Zrenjanin and the two "Democratic Alliance" members from Kikinda, the actual party affiliation of the democratic opposition delegates appears to have been as follows:

- Democratic Movement of Serbia: 19
- Reform Democratic Party of Vojvodina: 10
- Democratic Party: 6

== See also ==
- Autonomous Province of Vojvodina
- Politics of Vojvodina
