= Rajko Matović =

Serbian politician (born 1943)

Rajko Matović (Serbian Cyrillic: Рајко Матовић; born 1943) is a Serbian former politician. He was the mayor of Kikinda from 1992 to 1993 and was a member of the Serbian parliament from 1993 to 1994. During his time as an elected official, Matović was a member of the Socialist Party of Serbia (SPS).

== Private career ==
Matović is a graduated metallurgical engineer. At the time of his election as mayor, he was a technologist at Kikinda's foundry.

== Politician ==
=== Mayor of Kikinda ===
The Socialist Party of Serbia won a landslide victory in Kikinda in the May 1992 Serbian local elections, taking forty-one seats out of fifty-one. Matović was among the SPS delegates elected. When the municipal assembly convened on 29 June 1992, he was chosen as its president, a position that was at the time equivalent to mayor.

Many of Serbia's opposition parties boycotted the May 1992 elections, and ongoing doubts about the legitimacy of the vote led to new local elections in December 1992. The Socialists again won a landslide majority in Kikinda with forty seats, but Matović was personally defeated in his bid for re-election. His term as mayor ended when the new assembly convened on 18 January 1993.

=== Parliamentarian ===
Matović received the fourth position on the Socialist Party's electoral list for the Zrenjanin division in the 1992 Serbian parliamentary election, which took place concurrently with the local elections. The list won eight seats in the division, and he was included in his party's assembly delegation. (From 1992 to 2000, Serbia's electoral law stipulated that one-third of parliamentary mandates would be assigned to candidates from successful lists in numerical order, while the remaining two-thirds would be distributed amongst other candidates at the discretion of the sponsoring parties. Matović was not automatically elected by virtue of his list position, but he was assigned a mandate all the same.)

The Socialists won a plurality victory in the 1992 parliamentary election with 101 seats out of 250 and formed a new administration with the de facto support from the far-right Serbian Radical Party (SRS). Matović served as a government supporter and was a member of the committee for development and economic relations with foreign countries and the committee for industry, energy, mining, and construction.

The unofficial alliance between the SPS and the SRS fell apart in mid-1993, and a new Serbian parliamentary election was called for December of that year. On this occasion, Matović was assigned the fifteenth position on the SPS's list for Zrenjanin. The party won ten seats in the division, and he was not assigned a mandate for a second term.

A news report from March 1996 identified him as president of the Kikinda municipal assembly's executive council. Available online sources do not clarify how long he served in this role; his term certainly would have ended shortly after the Socialist Party's defeat in Kikinda in the 1996 Serbian local elections, if not sooner.
