= Surov =

Surov (Russian: Суров), feminine: Surova is a Russian surname. Notable people with the surname include:

- David Surov, Russian boxer
- Igor Surov (born 1985), Russian footballer
- Nikolay Surov (1947–2010), Russian rower
- Yekaterina Surova (born 1969), Russian philosopher and culturologist

== See also ==
- Surovy (surname)
