= Dragan Milovanović (politician, born 1953) =

Serbian politician (born 1953)

Dragan Milovanović (Serbian Cyrillic: Драган Миловановић; born 17.6.1953) is a Serbian politician. He served in the National Assembly of Serbia from 1997 to 2001 and was the mayor of Podujevo for a time in the 1990s. For most of his political career, Milovanović was a member of the far-right Serbian Radical Party (SRS).

== Early life and career ==
Milovanović was born to a Kosovo Serb family in Podujevo, in what was then the Autonomous Region of Kosovo and Metohija in the People's Republic of Serbia, Federal People's Republic of Yugoslavia. He has a Bachelor of Laws degree.

== Politician ==
=== Early candidacies at the federal and republican levels ===
In the 1990s, Serbian and Yugoslavian politics were dominated by the authoritarian role of Slobodan Milošević, leader of the Socialist Party of Serbia (SPS). Most Kosovo Albanians boycotted Serbian political institutions throughout the decade, and as a result the institutions were dominated by the Serb community.

Milovanović ran for the national assembly in the 1990 Serbian parliamentary election as an independent candidate in the Podujevo division. He was defeated by Zoran Paunović of the SPS, the only other candidate on the ballot. The Serbian Radical Party was founded in 1991, and Milovanović became a member of the organization.

The first elections for the Federal Republic of Yugoslavia's Chamber of Citizens were held in May 1992 under a system of mixed proportional representation. Milovanović received the thirty-second position on the SRS's electoral list and was not elected when the list won twenty-three seats.

Subsequent to the May 1992 vote, all Serbian and Yugoslavian parliamentary elections were held under full proportional representation. Milovanović appeared in the ninth position on the SRS's list for Leskovac in the 1992 Serbian parliamentary election and the tenth position in the 1993 Serbian parliamentary election. The Radicals won eight seats in the division in 1992 and three in 1993, and he did not receive a mandate on either occasion. (From 1992 to 2000, Serbia's electoral law stipulated that one-third of parliamentary mandates would be assigned to candidates on successful lists in numerical order, while the remaining two-thirds would be distributed amongst other candidates at the discretion of sponsoring parties or coalitions. Milovanović could have been awarded a mandate in either 1992 or 1993 despite his relatively low list positions, but he was not.)

Milovanović appeared in the lead position on the SRS's list for Kosovska Mitrovica in the 1996 Yugoslavian parliamentary election and would have been automatically elected had the list won any mandates. Instead, the Socialist Party's list won all three seats in the division.

=== Mayor of Podujevo ===
Milovanović served as mayor of Podujevo after the May 1992 and December 1992 Serbian local elections. The Radical Party's 1996 campaign literature indicates that the Socialist Party succeeded in bringing down his local administration during his second term.

=== Parliamentarian ===
Milovanović was given the third position on the Radical Party's list for Priština in the 1997 Serbian parliamentary election and received a mandate after the list won four seats. The SRS joined a coalition government led by the Socialist Party of Serbia in March 1998, and Milovanović served as a supporter of the administration. In late 1998, he was appointed as the Radical Party's acting chair for Kosovo.

Serbia lost effective control over most of Kosovo, including Podujevo, after the Kosovo War and the 1999 NATO bombing of Yugoslavia.

Vojislav Koštunica of the Democratic Opposition of Serbia (DOS) defeated Slobodan Milošević in the 2000 Yugoslavian presidential election, a watershed moment in Serbian and Yugoslavian politics. Serbia's government fell in October 2000, the Radical Party moved into opposition, and a new Serbian parliamentary election was held in December 2000. Before the vote, Serbia's electoral laws were reformed such that the entire country became a single electoral division and all mandates were awarded to candidates on successful lists at the discretion of the sponsoring parties or coalitions, irrespective of numerical order. Milovanović was given the twenty-ninth position on the Radical Party's list. The list won twenty-three seats, and he did not receive a mandate for a second term.

An individual named Dragan Milovanović became the leader of the cultural organization "Sveti Sava" in 2014 and organized an event with Radical Party leader Vojislav Šešelj in December of the same year. It is unclear if this is the same person.

== Electoral record ==
=== National Assembly of Serbia ===
1990 Serbian parliamentary election: Podujevo
| Candidate | Party |
|---|---|
| Dragan Milovanović | Citizens' Group |
| Zoran Paunović (***WINNER***) | Socialist Party of Serbia |
Total
