= Pavel Surovi =

Serbian politician

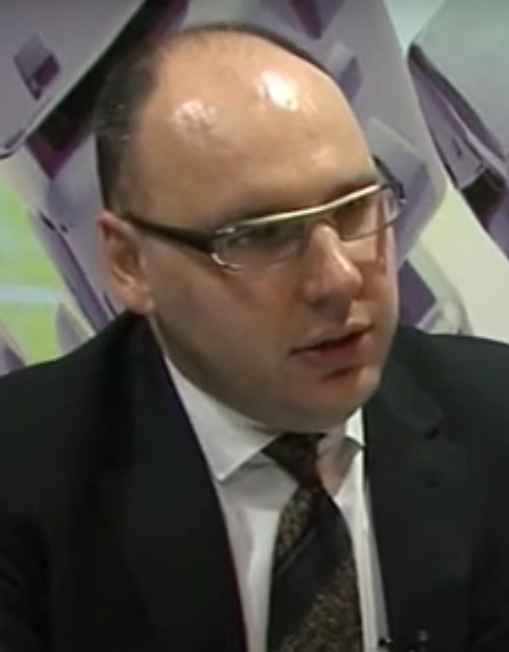
Surovi in 2017

Pavel Surovi (Serbian Cyrillic: Павел Сурови, Slovak: Pavel Surový; born 1980), is a politician in Serbia from the country's Slovak community. He is the leader of the Slovaks Forward party and has been a member of the Assembly of Vojvodina since 2016.

== Private career ==
Surovi lives in Novi Sad and holds a Bachelor of Science degree in Business Informatics. He has won awards as a graphic designer. Described as a passionate collector of Vojvodina Slovak folk costumes from before World War II, he has authored four photographic displays of Slovak culture in Serbia. The most recent, Corona (2020), was named both for the fact that it debuted during the COVID-19 pandemic (otherwise known as the coronavirus pandemic) and because of parallels between traditional Slovak clothing and European royal garb ("corona" translating as "crown"). Surovi is also the director of the culture centre in Kisač.

== Politician ==
=== Slovak National Council ===
Surovi appeared at the head of the Slovaks Forward electoral list in the 2014 election for Serbia's Slovak National Council and was elected when the list won nine out of twenty-nine mandates. In 2017, he accused council president Ana Tomanova Makanova of inappropriate spending. At around the same time, the Independent Association of Journalists of Vojvodina issued a statement that Surovi had been harassing and exerting political pressure on some Slovak-language journalists in the province.

He led the party's list again in the 2018 council elections and was re-elected when the list won eight mandates. He served as vice-president of the council after the election, although he was removed from this position in February 2021.

=== Provincial politics ===
Slovaks Forward became an official political party in late 2015. The party contested the 2016 Vojvodina provincial election as part of the Serbian Progressive Party's coalition; Surovi received the thirty-third position on the Progressive Party's list and was elected when the list won a majority victory with sixty-three out of 120 mandates. He was confirmed for a new term as party leader in 2019.

Surovi was promoted to the sixteenth position on the Progressive-led coalition list for the 2020 provincial election and was re-elected when the list won an increased majority with seventy-six mandates. He now is a member of the assembly committee on national equality and the committee on culture and public information. He sits in caucus with the Progressive Party's Aleksandar Vučić – For Our Children parliamentary group.
