= Zvonimir Stević =

Serbian politician

Zvonimir Stević (Serbian Cyrillic: Звонимир Стевић; born March 17, 1957) is a Serbian politician. He has served several terms in the assemblies of Yugoslavia and Serbia as a member of the Socialist Party of Serbia. From 2008 to 2012, he held a high-ranking position in Serbia's Ministry for Kosovo and Metohija.

== Early life and career ==
Stević was born in Priština, Autonomous Region of Kosovo and Metohija, then part of the People's Republic of Serbia in the Federal People's Republic of Yugoslavia. He has a Bachelor of Laws degree. He worked as a journalist for the paper Jedinstvo from 1984 to 1987 and was secretary of the commission for the YU program from 1987 to 1990.

== Political career ==
=== Federal and municipal official ===
Stević was the vice-president of the Priština municipal assembly from 1991 to 1999. He was also elected to the Assembly of the Federal Republic of Yugoslavia's Chamber of Citizens in the 1996 Yugoslavian parliamentary election for the Priština division, when the Socialist Party won three out of four available seats in the city. During the campaign, Stević argued that the policies of the Socialist Party had established a "law-governed state" in Kosovo and Metohija and "the equality of all its residents." The Socialist Party and its Montenegrin allies won the election, and Stević served on the government side in the sitting of the assembly that followed. In late 1998, he participated in a negotiation process between the Kosovo Serb and Kosovo Albanian communities against the backdrop of the emerging Kosovo War. He served on the Socialist Party's executive committee for the Kosovo-Metohija region in this period.

Stević continued to serve as a municipal official in Priština in the immediate aftermath the 1999 NATO bombing of Yugoslavia, although he acknowledged that the local government was an "empty shell" in the absence of a functioning police force. When British Kosovo Force officials arrived in the city in June 1999, Stević reported issues with overflowing trash bins, filthy streets, and water shortages to this new authority.

The United Nations (UN) subsequently brokered a deal for an integrated Serb and Albanian civil government in Priština; Stević became an interim co-mayor along with Mexhid Syla, an ethnic Albanian, in July 1999. Both co-mayors worked under the auspices of UN civil administrator J.F. Carter, who had the right to resolve disputes when they could not. Stević remarked at this time that the municipal integration agreement was "a step forward to end the divisions between the two communities in Kosovo."

Stević's term in the Yugoslavian parliament ended in 2000.

=== Member of the National Assembly ===
Stević received the 222nd position (out of 250) on the Socialist Party's electoral list in the 2000 Serbian parliamentary election. The party won thirty-seven seats, and he was not subsequently included in its delegation to the National Assembly of Serbia. (Between 2000 and 2011, Serbian parliamentary mandates were awarded to sponsoring parties or coalitions rather than to individual candidates, and it was common practice for mandates to be awarded out of numerical order. Stević's low position on the list – which was in any event mostly arranged in alphabetical order – would not have prevented him from being awarded a mandate, although ultimately he was not selected by the party).

He again appeared on the Socialist party's list in the 2003 parliamentary election. The party won twenty-two seats, and he was on this occasion selected for its assembly group. He took his seat when the assembly met in early 2004. In the parliament that followed, the Socialist Party agreed to provide outside support to the administration of Vojislav Koštunica. Stević called for Serbs to boycott the 2004 Kosovan parliamentary election, arguing that participation would legitimate the anti-Serb violence in the region earlier in the year.

Stević was given the fifteenth position on the Socialist Party's list in the 2007 election and was awarded a second term after the party won sixteen seats. A new ministry was formed after the election, and the Socialists moved into opposition.

=== Deputy Minister and State Secretary ===
Stević received the 215th position on a coalition list led by the Socialist Party in the 2008 parliamentary election. The list won twenty seats, and, after prolonged negotiations, the Socialist Party joined a new coalition government with the For a European Serbia group led by the Democratic Party. Stević did not receive an assembly mandate but was instead appointed as deputy minister and president of the co-ordination centre at the Ministry for Kosovo and Metohija in July 2008. In December of the same year, he ceased to be deputy minister and was reassigned as a state secretary in the ministry. Shortly after his initial appointment, he presided over a commemoration ceremony for the victims of the 1999 Staro Gracko massacre; he was quoted as saying that the murders were "one of the most cruel crimes in a series of crimes committed against Serbs in Kosovo since the deployment of the UN mission and [Kosovo Force]."

Soon after Stević's initial appointment, the ministry and co-ordination centre issued a directive calling on Serb community leaders in Kosovo and Metohija to provide the government with accurate information to create a proper social map and so to better facilitate state investments. In September 2008, he joined with minister Goran Bogdanović to open a new Kosovo Coordination Centre in Gračanica.

In 2009, Stević negotiated with Kosovo Serb workers who had left their administrative positions after Kosovo's unilateral declaration of independence the previous year on the advice of the Serbian government. The workers were demanding the government provide compensation for their lost wages; Stević said that their demands were justified and urged the government to resolve their situation.

Stević frequently expressed concern about the number of young Kosovo Serbs leaving the area due to limited employment prospects and, though his ministry, oversaw a strategic plan for a return of Serbs to the region. In August 2009, both he and Bogdanović acknowledged that the plan had been delayed due to the 2008 financial crisis.

His ministry urged Serbs not to participate in the 2009 local elections in Kosovo, on the grounds that they were organized in a "unilaterally proclaimed independent Kosovo" and took place under the auspices of the Ahtisaari Plan, which was not supported by Serbia. Speaking on behalf of the Socialist Party, Stević also urged Serbs to boycott the 2010 Kosovan parliamentary election, saying that "the fundamental human rights of Kosovo Serbs are still being threatened" in the area. During this time, he was president of the party's provincial committee in Kosovo and Metohija.

Stević condemned the arrest of five Serbian officials by the Kosovo Police in early 2010, describing it as an intimidation tactic and accusing the European Union Rule of Law Mission in Kosovo (EULEX) of complicity in what he described as "brutal attempts at closing down Serbian institutions."

=== Return to the assembly ===
Serbia's electoral system was reformed in 2011, such that parliamentary mandates were awarded in numerical order to candidates on successful lists. Stević received the nineteenth position on the Socialist-led electoral list in the 2012 Serbian parliamentary election and was elected to a third term in the assembly when the list won forty-four mandates. After the election, the Socialists formed a new coalition government with the Serbian Progressive Party (SNS). The ministry for Kosovo and Metohija was abolished in August 2012, and Stević has not returned to a ministerial role since this time.

He was re-elected to the assembly in the elections of 2014 and 2016. The Socialist Party's governing alliance with the Progressives has continued throughout this time. Stević is currently a member of the assembly committee on Kosovo-Metohija; a deputy member of the committee on constitutional and legislative issues, the defence and internal affairs committee, and the committee on labour, social issues, social inclusion, and poverty reduction; a member of a working group "for the collection of facts and evidence for the investigation of crimes committed against Serbs and other national communities in Kosovo-Metohija"; and a member of the parliamentary friendship groups with Azerbaijan, Belarus, Brazil, Egypt, India, Israel, Kazakhstan, and Venezuela.

Stević was re-elected again in 2020 and 2022, after which he became the chair of the committee for Kosovo and a deputy member of the committee for constitutional affairs and legislation, committee for defense and internal affairs, and committee for labour, social affairs, social inclusion and poverty reduction. He resigned from the National Assembly on 7 February 2023 after being caught watching a pornographic film during a session in the National Assembly regarding the 2022–2023 North Kosovo crisis. Ivica Dačić, the leader of SPS, told Stević earlier that day to resign, while he also received criticism from SNS.

== Sports ==
Stević became the president of FK Gračanica in 1992 and served as president of FK Priština from 1995 to 1999.
