= May 1992 Vojvodina provincial election =

Local election in Croatia

The Serbian province of Vojvodina held a provincial election on 31 May 1992, with a second round of voting on 14 June 1992. The election took place concurrently with the May 1992 Yugoslavian parliamentary election and the May 1992 Serbian local elections.

This was the first provincial election held in Vojvodina after the reintroduction of multi-party democracy to Serbia in 1990 and the first to take place while Serbia was a constituent member of the Federal Republic of Yugoslavia. The election took place during the authoritarian rule of Socialist Party of Serbia (SPS) leader Slobodan Milošević and his allies, and against the backdrop of wars in Croatia and Bosnia, the latter of which had started earlier in the year.

As with the concurrent Yugoslavian and local elections, the May 1992 Vojvodina election was boycotted by several leading opposition groups, including the Democratic Party (DS) and the Democratic Movement of Serbia (DEPOS) alliance, the latter of which was dominated by the Serbian Renewal Movement (SPO). The Democratic Fellowship of Vojvodina Hungarians (VMDK) chose to participate in the elections on the grounds that it did not want the SPS to win by default in predominantly Hungarian communities.

All 120 members of the provincial assembly were elected for single-member constituencies under a two-round system of runoff voting.

The result, as expected, was a landslide victory for the SPS. Due to widespread skepticism about the legitimacy of the election, the provincial assembly was dissolved later in the year and a new provincial election was held in December 1992, this time with the participation of the main opposition parties.

== Results ==
Party	Seats
Socialist Party of Serbia	95
Citizens' Group candidates	9
Democratic Fellowship of Vojvodina Hungarians	8
Serbian Radical Party	3
Bunjevac-Šokac Party	1
Bunjevac-Šokac Party and Socialist Party of Serbia	1
Civic Movement for Subotica – Doves of Subotica	1
Democratic Alliance of Croats in Vojvodina	1
Serb Democratic Party	1
Total	120

== See also ==
- Autonomous Province of Vojvodina
- Politics of Vojvodina
