= 2000 Vojvodina provincial election =

Provincial elections were held in Vojvodina on 24 September and 8 October 2000.

== Electoral system ==
The 120 members of the Assembly of the Autonomous Province of Vojvodina were elected from 120 electoral districts using a two-round system of runoff voting. The second round of voting took place after the fall of Slobodan Milošević on 5 October 2000.

The Alliance of Vojvodina Hungarians (VMSZ) was part of the DOS organization at the republic level but ran its own candidates in Vojvodina, in an electoral alliance with the DOS.

== Results ==
| Party | Seats |
|---|---|
| Democratic Opposition of Serbia | 101 |
| Alliance of Vojvodina Hungarians | 14 |
| Socialist Party of Serbia–Yugoslav Left | 2 |
| Democratic Party of Vojvodina Hungarians | 1 |
| Vojvodina Democratic Opposition | 1 |
| Citizen's groups | 1 |
| Total | 120 |
Source: Provincial Electoral Commission

== See also ==
- Autonomous Province of Vojvodina
- Politics of Vojvodina
- Overthrow of Slobodan Milošević
