= Politics of Vojvodina =

Politics of Serbian province

The politics of Vojvodina takes place within the framework of its Statute which outlines the principles of governing of the province within the framework of the Constitution of Serbia and national laws. The province has a legislative assembly composed of 120 proportionally elected deputies, and a government composed of a president, vice-presidents, and the secretaries.

== Legal framework ==
Following the restoration of Serbia's independence in 2006, after dissolution of Serbia and Montenegro, the new provincial statute was adopted in 2008. The statute, in Article 185, defines itself as the highest legal act of the province while in Article 194 states that its provisions must be in accordance with the Constitution of Serbia. The Constitutional Court of Serbia is entitled to rule on conformity of the statute and other provincial acts with the constitution and national laws. The statute reaffirmed the autonomy but focused it primarily on executive power without any substantive legislative and judicial jurisdiction.

== Executive ==
The Government of Vojvodina is the executive body composed of a president, vice-presidents, and secretaries. Maja Gojković of the Serbian Progressive Party is serving as the president of the provincial government since 2024.

The jurisdiction of provincial government include regional and urban planning; environmental protection; management of forestry, fishing, and hunting; management of animal husbandry and veterinary medicine; management of inland waterways and irrigation canals; provincial language policy for ethnic minorities; promotion and development of tourism.

== Legislature ==
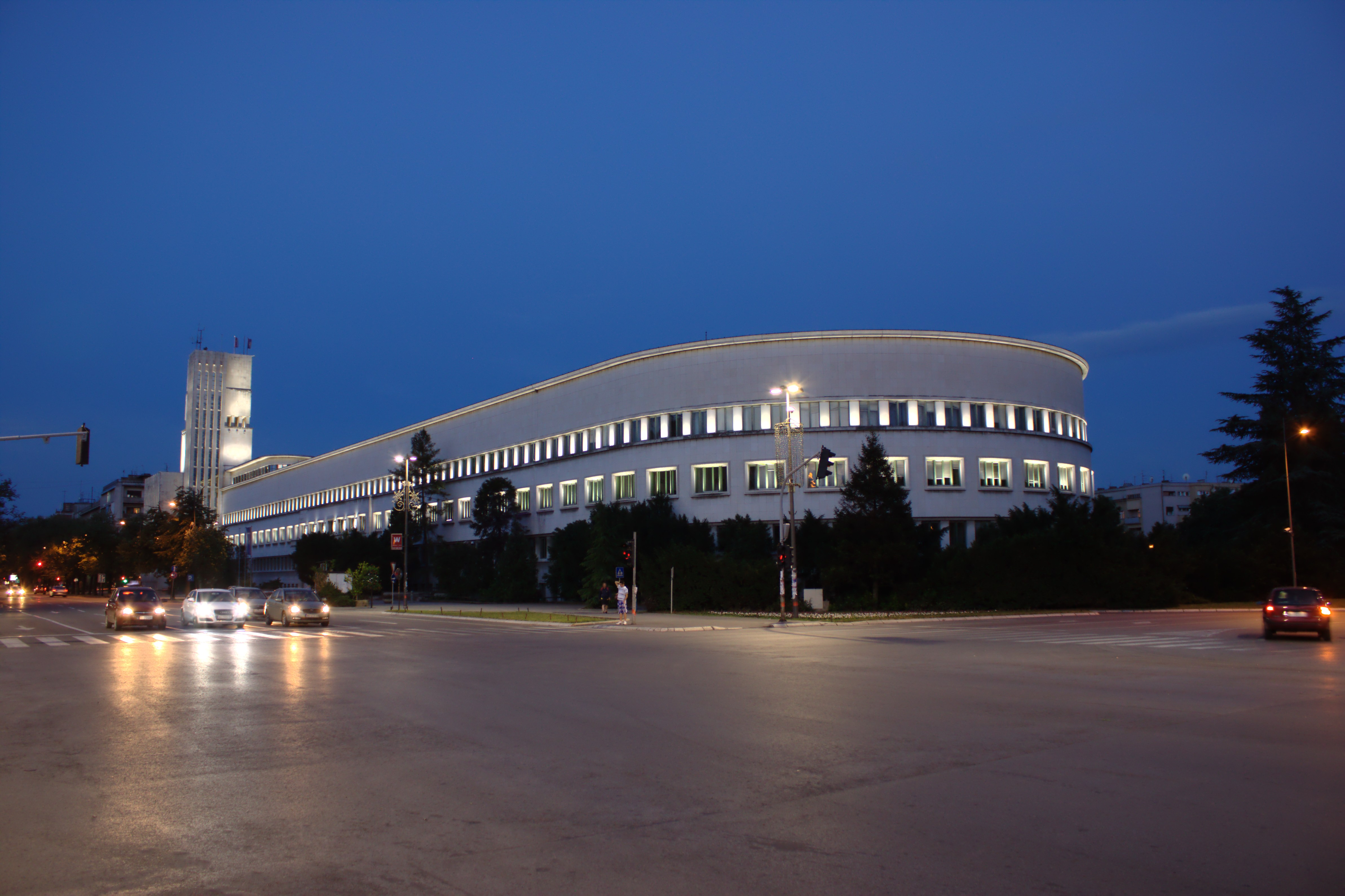
The Banovina Palace at night, seat of the Government of Vojvodina and Assembly of Vojvodina

The Assembly of Vojvodina is the unicameral body composed of 120 proportionally elected deputies by secret ballot. The current assembly was elected in the 2023 provincial elections. Juhász Bálint of Alliance of Vojvodina Hungarians is serving as the president of the Assembly of Vojvodina since 2024.

The Assembly of Vojvodina does not have legislative powers stricto senso since it only enacts decisions, resolutions, declarations, and recommendations. It elects, dismisses, and controls the work of the provincial government; approves and audits the provincial budget; decides on the borrowing of province in accordance with the national law; authorises a provincial referendum; ratifies agreements with the sub-national territorial units of other states in accordance with the national laws; elects the provincial ombudsman; promulgates acts on the establishment, competences, and regulation of provincial agencies and provincial-level public companies; proposes laws and other acts to the National Assembly.

== Political parties ==
The political landscape of the province is dominated by pan-national political parties and, to a lesser degree, parties of the ethnic minorities. Once significant regionalist parties, that advocate more autonomy for the province, have not gained significant traction of votes in recent elections and are currently not represented in the Assembly of Vojvodina. Since 2012, the populist Serbian Progressive Party has been the dominant power in provincial politics.

=== National political parties ===
National political parties include:

- Serbian Progressive Party (Srpska napredna stranka)
- Socialist Party of Serbia (Socijalistička partija Srbije)
- Party of Freedom and Justice (Stranka slobode i pravde)
- Democratic Party (Demokratska stranka)
- Serbia Centre (Srbija Centar)
- New Democratic Party of Serbia (Nova demokratska stranka Srbije)
- Green–Left Front (Zeleno–levi front)

=== Ethnic minorities political parties ===
Main political parties of ethnic minorities are:

- Alliance of Vojvodina Hungarians (Hungarian: Vajdasági Magyar Szövetség; Serbian: Savez vojvođanskih Mađara)
- Slovaks Forward (Slovak: Slováci vpred; Serbian: Slovaci napred)
- Democratic League of Croats in Vojvodina (Demokratski savez Hrvata u Vojvodini)

=== Regionalist political parties ===
Main regionalist political party is the League of Social Democrats of Vojvodina (Liga socijaldemokrata Vojvodine), currently not represented in the provincial parliament.

== Elections ==
In 2023 provincial elections, coalition of parties led by the Serbian Progressive Party won the elections, forming new provincial cabinet in coalition with the Socialist Party of Serbia and the main ethnic Hungarian minority party, the Alliance of Vojvodina Hungarians.

Electoral list	Votes	%	+/–	Seats	+/–
Vojvodina Must Not Stop	466,035	48.82	–12.76	66	–10
Serbia Against Violence	215,197	22.55	New	30	New
Alliance of Vojvodina Hungarians	63,721	6.68	–2.61	9	–3
National Democratic Alternative	50,582	5.30	–3.29	7	–3
SPS–JS–ZS	49,775	5.21	–5.97	7	–4
LSV–VMDK–ZZV	24,625	2.58	–2.54	0	–6
National Gathering	22,487	2.36	New	0	New
Serbian Radical Party	21,135	2.21	–1.06	0	–4
Good Morning Serbia	14,715	1.54	New	0	New
Russian Party	9,907	1.04	New	1	New
People's Party	8,140	0.85	New	0	New
SPP–DSHV	4,979	0.52	–0.14	0	–
Vojvodina Must Be Different	3,221	0.34	–0.24	0	–
Total	954,519	100.00	–	120	0
Valid votes	954,519	96.91			
Invalid/blank votes	30,444	3.09			
Total votes	984,963	100.00			
Registered voters/turnout	1,669,791	58.99			
Source: Provincial Electoral Commission

== See also ==
- Politics of Serbia
- 2020 Vojvodina provincial election
- 2016 Vojvodina provincial election
- 2012 Vojvodina provincial election
- 2008 Vojvodina provincial election
