= 1996 Vojvodina provincial election =

Provincial elections were held in Vojvodina on 3 and 17 November 1996.

== Electoral system ==
The 120 members of the Assembly of the Autonomous Province of Vojvodina were elected from 120 electoral districts using a two-round system of runoff voting.

== Results ==
| Party | Seats |
|---|---|
| Socialist Party of Serbia | 74 |
| Coalition Together | 16 |
| Alliance of Vojvodina Hungarians | 13 |
| Serbian Radical Party | 7 |
| Vojvodina Coalition | 6 |
| Yugoslav Left | 1 |
| Democratic Fellowship of Vojvodina Hungarians | 1 |
| Citizen's Group candidates | 2 |
| Total | 120 |
Source: Provincial Electoral Commission

== See also ==
- Autonomous Province of Vojvodina
- Politics of Vojvodina
