= Serb Democratic Party (Serbia, 1990–2003) =

Political party in Serbia

The Serb Democratic Party (Serbian: Српска демократска странка, romanized: Srpska Demokratska Stranka, abbr. SDS), alternately known as the Serb Democratic Party of Serbia (Serbian: Српска демократска странка Србије, romanized: Srpska Demokratska Stranka Srbije, abbr. SDSS), was a minor political party that existed in Serbia between 1990 and 2003. On two occasions (i.e., 1990 and 2003), the party won representation in the Serbian parliament. After the 2003 Serbian parliamentary election, the SDS dissolved itself into the Democratic Party of Serbia (DSS).

The SDS of Serbia had connections to parties of the same name in Croatia and Bosnia and Herzegovina, but unlike those parties it had only a marginal influence on the political culture of the region.

== Early years ==
The Serb Democratic Party was established in 1990 after the re-introduction of multi-party politics to Serbia. Its first leader was Anđelko Ležajić. The party fielded a number of candidates in the 1990 Serbian parliamentary election and received 32,927 votes (0.68%) in total. One of the party's candidates was elected: Tode Vojvodić in the constituency of Stara Pazova and Pećinci.

During the 1991–93 Serbian parliament, the Socialist Federal Republic of Yugoslavia (SFRY) disintegrated and the Yugoslav Wars of the 1990s began. Ležajić later recalled seeing Jovan Rašković, leader of the SDS in Croatia, urging Serbs to use methods of Gandhian resistance to win their own state in the predominantly Serb areas of Croatia and Bosnia. (Rašković was ultimately replaced by more hardline elements in the party.) In a Serbian parliamentary debate in March 1991, during the opening stages of the Croatian War, Vojvodić accused the Serbian government of abandoning the Serbs of Croatia while Croatian authorities were arming militants associated with the Croatian Democratic Union (HDZ), who in turn were harassing the Serb community.

The SDS participated in the May 1992 Yugoslavian parliamentary election, winning 87,589 votes (2.28%) and no seats. The election took place under a system of mixed proportional representation; the leader of the party's electoral list was Jovan Rašković, who had by this time relocated to Serbia. Rašković died in July 1992. The SDS's leader in Serbia after this time was Velimir Branković.

For the December 1992 Yugoslavian parliamentary election, held under a system of full proportional representation, the SDS formed an alliance with Milan Paroški's People's Party called Srpska Opozicija (English: Serbian Opposition). The alliance won 200,044 votes (4.3%) and no seats. In the concurrent 1992 Serbian parliamentary election, also held under a system of full proportional representation, the SDS ran on its own and won 9,771 votes and no seats. The party's main area of support in the republican election was the Novi Sad constituency, where Branković led the electoral list.

In the 1993 Serbian parliamentary election, the SDS won 15,447 votes and once again won no seats. The party's electoral lists identified the writer Radomir Smiljanić as its leader during this time.

== Merger talks and later history ==
In 1996, Velimir Branković represented the SDS in negotiations with the Democratic Party of Serbia (DSS), the Serbian Liberal Party (SLS), and the Serbian National Renewal (SNO) to create a united "Serb Democratic Party of the Serbian Lands." Although this initiative was ultimately not successful, the SNO made a decision at its 1997 convention to merge into the new party under Radovan Karadžić's leadership. In practice, this meant that the SNO operated afterward as part of the SDS in Serbia.

Dragoljub Kojčić became the leader of the SDS in Serbia in 1997. The SNO retained its autonomy in the party and ultimately clashed with Kojčić's leadership. In the late 1990s, SNO leader Mirko Jović negotiated with Democratic Party (DS) leader Zoran Đinđić to bring the SDS into Đinđić's "Alliance for Change," a coalition of parties opposed to the continued rule of Slobodan Milošević and the Socialist Party of Serbia (SPS). According to Jović, the main board of the SDS voted to join Đinđić's coalition but that Kojčić refused to implement the decision, leading to a party split and the departure of the SNO.

After the fall of Slobodan Milošević in October 2000, a transitional government was established in Serbia comprising the Socialist Party, the Serbian Renewal Movement (SPO), and the Democratic Opposition of Serbia (DOS). Although the SDS was not formally aligned with any of these groups, Kojčić was appointed as deputy minister of relations with Serbs outside Serbia, a role he held until a new government was formed in January 2001.

== Dissolution into the DSS ==
In November 2003, the Democratic Party of Serbia announced that Kojčić would appear on its electoral list for the 2003 Serbian parliamentary election as a SDS candidate. He ultimately received the thirty-first position on the list and was given a parliamentary mandate when the list won fifty-three seats. The SDS appears to have dissolved soon after the election, and Kojčić served afterward as a DSS member of the national assembly.
