= Ilija Ćosić =

Serbian politician (born 1948)

Ilija Ćosić (Serbian Cyrillic: Илија Ћосић; born 5 September 1948) is a Serbian academic, engineer, and politician. He is a professor emeritus with the University of Novi Sad. Ćosić has served in the National Assembly of Serbia and the Assembly of Vojvodina and has held high office within the Democratic Party (DS).

== Early life and academic career ==
Ćosić was born in the village of Rivica in Irig, Autonomous Province of Vojvodina, in what was then the People's Republic of Serbia in the Federal People's Republic of Yugoslavia. He attended elementary school in Irig and secondary school in Ruma and graduated from the University of Novi Sad Faculty of Mechanical Engineering in 1972. He also served in the Yugoslav People's Army in this period, graduating from the School of Reserve Technical Officers in Zagreb in 1973–74.

Ćosić received a master's degree from the University of Novi Sad Faculty of Technical Sciences in 1979 and a Ph.D. from the same institution in 1983. As a graduate student, he spent a considerable amount of time at international universities, including in Germany, Switzerland, Austria, and Thailand. He became an assistant professor at the University of Novi Sad in 1983, an associate professor in 1988, and a full professor in the field of production systems in 1993. He was dean of the Faculty of Technical Sciences from 1998 to 2014 and was given the title of professor emeritus in 2016.

He has published widely in his field, participated in various scientific-academic projects, and received several academic and civil honours.

== Politician ==
=== Socialist Republic of Serbia ===
Ćosić became politically active when Serbia was a one-party socialist state. His academic biography indicates that he served in the assembly of Novi Sad from 1978 to 1982 and was a delegate in the Assembly of the Socialist Republic of Serbia from 1984 to 1988.

=== Republic of Serbia ===
Ćosić ran for Novi Sad's sixth constituency seat in the 2004 Vojvodina provincial election as a candidate of Together for Vojvodina (ZZT), a multi-party coalition led by the League of Social Democrats of Vojvodina (LSV). He finished in third place.

He later joined the Democratic Party and was elected for Irig in the 2012 provincial election. The DS and its allies won a majority government, and he supported the administration in the assembly. He served on the committee for the economy and the committee for education, science, culture, youth, and sports. He was not a candidate for re-election in 2016.

Ćosić was elected as president of the Democratic Party's Novi Sad committee in June 2013. He offered to resign after the party's poor performance in the 2014 Serbian parliamentary election, but this was rejected. He ultimately stood down in October 2014.

He was appointed to the Democratic Party's political council in December 2016.

== Electoral record ==
=== Provincial (Vojvodina) ===
2012 Vojvodina provincial election: Irig
Candidate	Party	First round		Second round	
Candidate	Party	Votes	%	Votes	%
Ilija Ćosić	"Choice for a Better Vojvodina–Bojan Pajtic" (Affiliation: Democratic Party)	1,641	29.05	2,777	60.57
Dr. Branka Solomunović	Let's Get Vojvodina Moving–Tomislav Nikolić (Serbian Progressive Party, New Serbia, Movement of Socialists, Strength of Serbia Movement)	1,041	18.43	1,808	39.43
Marija Radojčić (list incumbent)	League of Social Democrats of Vojvodina–Nenad Čanak	764	13.52		
Radovan Ninković (incumbent)	Socialist Party of Serbia (SPS), Party of United Pensioners of Serbia (PUPS), United Serbia (JS), Social Democratic Party of Serbia (SDP Serbia)	683	12.09		
Slobodan Radojčić	U-Turn for the Municipality of Irig (Liberal Democratic Party, Serbian Renewal Movement)	550	9.74		
Stevan Ivković	Serbian Radical Party	530	9.38		
Fedor Pušić	United Regions of Serbia–Mlađan Dinkić	440	7.79		
Total		5,649	100.00	4,585	100.00

2004 Vojvodina provincial election: Novi Sad Division 6
Candidate	Party	First round		Second round	
Candidate	Party	Votes	%	Votes	%
Borislav Novaković (incumbent)	"Democratic Party–Boris Tadić"	6,473	40.14	10,742	57.70
Zoran Vučević	Serbian Radical Party	4,457	27.64	7,875	42.30
Prof. Dr. Ilija Ćosić	"Together for Vojvodina–Nenad Čanak"	1,511	9.37		
Predrag Svilar	Democratic Party of Serbia	1,100	6.82		
Ljubiša Vojinović	Strength of Serbia Movement	1,065	6.60		
Dobrivoj Vasić	Clean Hands of Vojvodina–SPO, Reformists of Vojvodina, Otpor–Miodrag Mile Isakov–Vuk Drašković	836	5.18		
Dušan Todorović	Socialist Party of Serbia	683	4.24		
Total		16,125	100.00	18,617	100.00
Valid votes		16,125	96.97	18,617	97.42
Invalid/blank votes		504	3.03	493	2.58
Total votes		16,629	100.00	19,110	100.00
