= Milutin Stojković =

Serbian academic and politician

Milutin Stojković (Serbian Cyrillic: Милутин Стојковић; born 19 August 1942) is a retired Serbian academic and politician. He was a deputy prime minister of Serbia from 1997 to 1998 and has held leading positions in the parliaments of Vojvodina and the Federal Republic of Yugoslavia (FRY). Stojković is a member of the Socialist Party of Serbia (SPS).

== Early life and academic career ==
Stojković was born in the village of Mijatovac in the municipality of Ćuprija, in what was then the Territory of the Military Commander in Serbia during the Axis occupation of Serbia in World War II. He grew up in the People's Federal Republic of Yugoslavia.

He received a bachelor's degree from the University of Novi Sad's Faculty of Economics in Subotica in 1979 and a master's degree and Ph.D. from the same institution in 1985. A specialist in mathematics and statistics, he has taught at several universities, including in Subotica. He has published several books on statistics.

Stojković was one of the founding members of the higher medical school in Ćuprija and lectured there until 2014. In 2017, he was appointed to its board of directors.

== Politician ==
Stojković became politically prominent in the early-to-mid 1990s, when the political life of Serbia and Yugoslavia was dominated by the authoritarian rule of SPS leader and Serbian president Slobodan Milošević. During this time, Stojković was a Milošević loyalist.

=== President of the Vojvodina assembly ===
Stojković was elected to the Assembly of Vojvodina for Ruma's second division in the May 1992 provincial election, the first to be held after the return of multi-party democracy in 1990. The SPS won a majority victory, and Stojković served as a government supporter. He was re-elected in the December 1992 provincial election, which was again won by the SPS, and served president of the assembly in the term that followed, from 1993 to 1997.

Stojković also appeared in the twenty-sixth position (out of twenty-eight) on the SPS's electoral list for the Novi Sad division in the 1992 Serbian parliamentary election. The list won nine seats in the division, and he was not given a mandate. (From 1992 to 2000, Serbia's electoral law stipulated that one-third of parliamentary mandates would be awarded to candidates from successful lists in numerical order while the remaining two-thirds would be distributed amongst other candidates at the discretion of the sponsoring parties or alliances. It was common practice for the latter mandates to be assigned out of order. Stojković could have been awarded a seat despite his list position, but this did not happen.)

In 1993, facing complaints from farmers who received inadequate compensation for grain shipments, he argued that provincial authorities could not override harmful purchasing policy decisions made at the republic level in Belgrade. He was quoted as saying, "Although we are in power, we are practically powerless."

=== Federal parliamentarian and deputy prime minister ===
==== 1996–98 ====
Stojković was elected to the Yugoslavian assembly's Council of Citizens (i.e., the lower house of parliament) in the 1996 Yugoslavian election, presumably for the Sremska Mitrovica division, which included Ruma and where a political alliance led by the SPS won two out of four seats. The SPS's alliance won the election, and Stojković was chosen as leader of the party's caucus in the Council of Citizens. In December 1996, he was named as chair of the committee for defence and security.

He was appointed as one of Serbia's five deputy prime ministers in a cabinet shuffle on 11 February 1997, replacing fellow SPS member Slobodan Babić.

In July 1997, the Yugoslavian parliament hastily elected Slobodan Milošević as Yugoslavian president. Stojković welcomed the outcome, saying that Milošević would "further contribute to the country's respect in the world."

The SPS formed a new Serbian coalition government with the far-right Serbian Radical Party (SRS) and the Yugoslav Left (JUL) in March 1998, and Stojković was dropped from cabinet.

Stojković supported the election of Momir Bulatović and Yugoslavian prime minister in May 1998, predicting he would be "a fighter against crime and corruption."

In November 1998, Stojković led a delegation of the Yugoslavian assembly to the international secretariat of the European Interparliamentary Assembly on Orthodoxy. Two months later, he led a delegation to a meeting of the interparliamentary assembly in Odesa on the Orthodox creed and post-industrial society.

==== Kosovo War and NATO bombing of Yugoslavia ====
In December 1998, during the Kosovo War and in the buildup to the 1999 NATO bombing of Yugoslavia, Stojković introduced a motion in the Chamber of Citizens condemning the United States of America for supporting "terrorists and separatists" seeking to create a Greater Albania. On the day before the NATO bombing campaign began, he said, "I am convinced the Western power-wielders have finally realized that they cannot play with our country, because we will form a front to defend our sacred Kosovo-Metohija [...] We are prepared to defend what is ours at any cost. NATO will break its teeth on us. Serbia has never attacked anyone in its history, but those who attack her will certainly lose the war." In April 1999, he responded to threats of a NATO ground invasion by saying, "Should NATO decide for this option, it will have to expect that thousands of people will be killed. They will then be sent back to NATO countries in coffins."

On 10 June 1999, Stojković spoke at a conference on Slavic integration in Kyiv that was mostly attended by representatives of left-wing parties in Russia, Ukraine, and Belarus. He was described as receiving the loudest cheers at the event. Stojković described the entry of international peacekeeping forces into Kosovo as a moral victory for the Serbian people at the end of the Kosovo War.

==== After the conflict ====
Stojković represented the SPS in multi-party discussions on the future of the Yugoslavian federation at the end of the Kosovo conflict. In mid-July 1999, he accused the Democratic Party of Socialists of Montenegro of not presenting a platform on redefining relations within the federation. In the same month, he represented the Yugoslavian parliament in discussions to join the Union State of Russia and Belarus.

Somewhat unexpectedly, Stojković criticized Russian foreign affairs minister Igor Ivanov in March 2000, describing him as a "meddler" whose diplomacy threatened Yugoslavia's sovereignty. "We have not – nor shall in the future – authorize anyone to negotiate on behalf of our interests," he was quoted as saying. "If the diplomacy of Mr. Ivanov consists of fawning over the Americans, he may do so at the expense of Russian – not Serbian – national interests." This notwithstanding, he took part in a Yugoslavian delegation to monitor the 2000 Russian presidential election later in the same month.

In June 2000, he attended the thirty-third congress of the Communist Party of Ukraine.

Stojković helped bring about changes to Yugoslavia's constitution in mid-2000 that allowed Slobodan Milošević to seek re-election as president. During the parliamentary debates on this subject, he said that the SPS would "not tolerate individual deputies criticizing FRY President Slobodan Milosevic." He was quoted as saying, "While our president was creating, building, defending and in the end defended our fatherland, some federal deputies – together with Clinton, Blair, Cook, Chirac and Solana – were doing their utmost to destroy the country and make it prey to the criminals who had bombed us for 78 days."

Stojković does not appear to have sought re-election in the 2000 Yugoslavian general election.

=== Since 2000 ===
Slobodan Milošević was defeated by Democratic Opposition of Serbia (DOS) candidate Vojislav Koštunica in the 2000 Yugoslavian presidential election. This was a watershed moment in the political life of Serbia and Yugoslavia.

Serbia's electoral laws were reformed in late 2000, such that all national assembly mandates were awarded to candidates on successful lists at the discretion of the sponsoring parties or coalitions, irrespective of numerical order. Stojković appeared on the SPS's electoral lists in the parliamentary elections of 2000, 2003, 2007, and 2008, though he did not receive a mandate on any of these occasions. He served in the Ruma municipal assembly in the 2004–08 term.

Serbia's electoral laws were again reformed in 2011, such that all mandates were awarded to candidates on successful lists in numerical order. Stojković appeared in the 159th position on the SPS alliance's list in the 2014 parliamentary election; election from this position was not a realistic prospect, and he was not elected when the list won forty-four mandates.

Stojković also ran for the Ruma constituency seat in the 2004 and 2012 Vojvodina provincial elections. He was defeated both times.

== Electoral record ==
=== Provincial (Vojvodina) ===
2012 Vojvodina provincial election: Ruma
Candidate	Party	First round		Second round	
Candidate	Party	Votes	%	Votes	%
Nenad Borović (incumbent)	Choice for a Better Vojvodina–Bojan Pajtic (Affiliation: Democratic Party)	7,389	28.88	11,405	51.67
Rada Maravić	Let's Get Vojvodina Moving–Tomislav Nikolić (Serbian Progressive Party, New Serbia, Movement of Socialists, Strength of Serbia Movement) (Affiliation: Serbian Progressive Party)	5,694	22.26	10,667	48.33
Aleksandar Martinović	Serbian Radical Party	5,195	20.30		
Milutin Hadži Stojković	Socialist Party of Serbia (SPS), Party of United Pensioners of Serbia (PUPS), United Serbia (JS), Social Democratic Party of Serbia (SDP Serbia) (Affiliation: Socialist Party of Serbia)	3,486	13.63		
Dejan Božić	League of Social Democrats of Vojvodina–Nenad Čanak	2,695	10.53		
Slobodan Kosanović	U-Turn	1,126	4.40		
Total		25,585	100.00	22,072	100.00

2004 Vojvodina provincial election: Ruma
Candidate	Party	First round		Second round	
Candidate	Party	Votes	%	Votes	%
Srđan Nikolić	Serbian Radical Party	4,863	33.30	8,884	64.74
Vlatko Ratković	Democratic Party–Boris Tadić	1,950	13.35	4,839	35.26
Smilja Lončar	Democratic Party of Serbia	1,767	12.10		
Milutin Stojković	Socialist Party of Serbia	1,642	11.24		
Ljiljana Avramović	G17 Plus	814	5.57		
Steva Lazarević	Together for Vojvodina–Nenad Čanak	728	4.98		
Milutin Živanović	Strength of Serbia Movement	709	4.85		
Jovan Adnađević	United Peasant Party	569	3.90		
Dušan Stojanac	Citizens' Group: Serbian People's Movement "Svetozar Miletić"	506	3.46		
Mile Dokmanović	Serbian Renewal Movement	408	2.79		
Julijana Golčevski	Coalition: One for the Municipality of Ruma (Social Democracy of Ruma, Reformists of Vojvodina–Social Democratic Party of Ruma, People's Peasant Party of Ruma, Workers and Pensioners Party–SRP Ruma)	336	2.30		
Milutin Trbović Miša	New Serbia–Union of Serbs of Vojvodina	312	2.14		
Total		14,604	100.00	13,723	100.00
Valid votes		14,604	96.04	13,723	97.69
Invalid/blank votes		602	3.96	324	2.31
Total votes		15,206	100.00	14,047	100.00
Registered voters/turnout		15,206	100.00	14,047	100.00

December 1992 Vojvodina provincial election: Ruma Division 2
Candidate	Party
Milutin Stojković (incumbent) (ELECTED)	Socialist Party of Serbia
Dušan Brzak	Serbian Peasant Party
Ninoslav Gvero	Democratic Party
Stevan Lazić	Citizens' Group
Jelica Mihailović	Democratic Movement of Serbia
Dragiša Radenković	Serb Democratic Party
Miroslav Sovilj	Serbian Radical Party
Total
Source: All candidates except Stojković are listed alphabetically.

May 1992 Vojvodina provincial election: Ruma Division 2 (Second Round)
Candidate	Party
Milutin Stojković (ELECTED)	Socialist Party of Serbia
Petar Stamenović	Serbian Radical Party
Total
