= Branislav Pomoriški =

Serbian politician

Branislav Pomoriški (Serbian Cyrillic: Бранислав Поморишки; born 28 January 1956) is an entrepreneur and former politician in Serbia. He served two terms in the National Assembly of Serbia between 1997 and 2004 and was president of the executive board in Novi Sad's city government from 2000 to 2004. During his time as an elected official, Pomoriški was a member of the League of Social Democrats of Vojvodina (LSV).

== Early life and career ==
Pomoriški was born in the village of Botoš in Zrenjanin, Autonomous Province of Vojvodina, in what was then the People's Republic of Serbia in the Federal People's Republic of Yugoslavia. He attended high school in Zrenjanin and graduated from the University of Belgrade Faculty of Economics with a bachelor's degree (1981) and a master's degree (1984). He later worked in the banking and financial sectors.

He has served as director of the "Vojvodina" Sports and Business Center and president of the management board of Naftna Industrija Srbije.

== Politician ==
=== Parliamentarian ===
The LSV participated in the 1997 Serbian parliamentary election as part of the Vojvodina Coalition. Pomoriški appeared in the lead position on the coalition's electoral list for the Zrenjanin division and was elected when the list won a single mandate in the division. (From 1992 to 2000, Serbia's electoral law stipulated that one-third of parliamentary mandates would be assigned to candidates from successful lists in numerical order, while the remaining two-thirds would be distributed amongst other candidates on the lists at the discretion of the sponsoring parties. As the list only won a single seat in the division, Pomoriški was automatically assigned the mandate.) The Socialist Party of Serbia and its allies won the election, and the Vojvodina Coalition served in opposition.

Three Vojvodina Coalition members, including Pomoriški and LSV leader Nenad Čanak, were expelled from the assembly under dubious circumstances on 7 December 1998, following a split in the movement; their mandates were revoked by the coalition's new leadership as recognized by Serbia's election commission. Following his expulsion, Pomoriški charged that the Serbian national assembly had ceased to be a real parliament and that Vojvodina was not receiving "a single dinar of authentic income as a province" due to pervasive state corruption.

The LSV subsequently contested the 2000 Serbian parliamentary election as part of the Democratic Opposition of Serbia (DOS), a broad and ideologically diverse coalition of parties opposed to the authoritarian rule of former Yugoslavian president Slobodan Milošević. For this election, the entire country was counted as a single electoral division, and all mandates were assigned to candidates on the lists at the discretion of successful parties and coalitions, irrespective of numerical order. Pomoriški appeared in the sixty-fourth position on the DOS list and was awarded a mandate after the list won a landslide majority with 176 out of 250 seats.

Pomoriški and several other delegates resigned from the assembly on 12 June 2002, but their resignations were subsequently annulled on technical grounds. He continued serving as a parliamentarian until a new assembly was constituted in January 2004.

In February 2003, Pomoriški was involved in an altercation with Serbian Radical Party parliamentarian Tomislav Nikolić: Pomoriški insulted Nikolić's mother and spat on him, after which Nikolić spat on Pomoriški and pushed him. Nikolić was subsequently suspended from the assembly for thirty days for his actions.

=== City politics in Novi Sad ===
The 1996 city elections in Novi Sad were won by the Zajedno coalition, which included the LSV. Pomoriški served as a member of the city assembly's executive board following the election, with responsibility for finance. He was elected to the city assembly in the 2000 local elections as a DOS candidate. The DOS won a landslide victory in this election, and Pomoriški was appointed as president of the executive board of the city government for the term that followed.

He ran for mayor of Novi Sad in the 2004 local elections as a candidate of the Together for Vojvodina coalition (which included the LSV) and finished in third place against Radical Party candidate Maja Gojković. He was strongly critical of Gojković's administration, accusing her of trying to turn Novi Sad into a provincial backwater.

=== State Secretary in the Government of Serbia ===
Pomoriški was appointed as a state secretary in Serbia's ministry of the national investment plan in 2008. He was removed from the position in early 2010, against the backdrop of divisions between the LSV and G17 Plus, a party in Serbia's coalition government that controlled the ministry.

== Entrepreneur ==
In 2011, Pomoriški founded the renewable energy company "Bioelektra". He subsequently took over the company "Mladast" in his home community of Botoš. In 2018, the newspaper Danas profiled his project to make Botoš the first village in Serbia with district heating.

== Electoral record ==
=== Municipal (Novi Sad) ===
2004 City of Novi Sad local election Mayor of Novi Sad - First and Second Rounds
Candidate	Party or Coalition	Votes	%	Votes	%
Maja Gojković	Serbian Radical Party	44,013	42.65	60,347	50.47
Borislav Novaković (incumbent)	Democratic Party	34,300	33.24	59,224	49.53
Branislav Pomoriški	Together for Vojvodina	8,450	8.19		
Đorđe Bašić	Strength of Serbia Movement	5,243	5.08		
Dejan Mikavica	Democratic Party of Serbia	3,942	3.82		
Miodrag Isakov	Serbian Renewal Movement–Reformists of Vojvodina	3,556	3.45		
Miloš Tomić	G17 Plus	2,171	2.10		
Branislav Švonja	Community of Serbs of Croatia and Bosnia and Herzegovina	894	0.87		
Zoran Stojanović	New Serbia	628	0.61		
Total valid votes		103,197	100	119,571	100
