= Đorđe Bašić =

Serbian politician (1946–2007)

Đorđe Bašić (Serbian Cyrillic: Ђорђе Башић; 1946–19 November 2007) was a politician in Serbia. He was a member of the National Assembly of Serbia and the Assembly of Vojvodina, and he held prominent office at the city level in Novi Sad. Bašić was at different times in his career a member of the Democratic Party (Demokratska stranka, DS) and the Strength of Serbia Movement (Pokret Snaga Srbije, PSS).

== Early life and private career ==
Bašić was born in Novi Sad, Autonomous Province of Vojvodina, in what was then the People's Republic of Serbia in the Federal People's Republic of Yugoslavia. He received a bachelor's degree and a master's degree at the University of Novi Sad and a Ph.D. at the University of Belgrade. He worked at the Institute of Energy and Process Engineering at the University of Novi Sad, serving for a time as president of the faculty council.

== Politician ==
=== Early years ===
Bašić became the first elected president of the executive council of Novi Sad's city assembly in 1990, being chosen for the position over several other candidates. He sought election to the National Assembly of Serbia in the 1990 parliamentary election as an independent candidate in Novi Sad's first division. The winning candidate was Petar Petrović of the Union of Reform Forces of Yugoslavia for Vojvodina (SRSJ-V).

=== Democratic Party ===
Bašić subsequently joined the DS and was elected as chair of the party's provincial board for Vojvodina in 1993.

Bašić appeared in the lead position on the DS's electoral list for the Novi Sad division in the 1993 Serbian parliamentary election and was elected when the list won four mandates. (From 1992 to 2000, Serbia's electoral law stipulated that one-third of parliamentary mandates would be assigned to candidates from successful lists in numerical order, while the remaining two-thirds would be distributed amongst other candidates on the lists at the discretion of the sponsoring parties. Due to his list position, Bašić received an automatic mandate.) The Socialist Party of Serbia won the election, and the DS served in opposition. Bašić took his seat when the assembly met in early 1994 and was chosen as one of the assembly's vice-presidents (i.e., deputy speakers). He also chaired the committee on foreign economic relations. During his term in the assembly, he was described in a New York Times article as the highest-ranking member of the Serbian opposition.

In August 1994, Bašić said that a proposal from the Republika Srpska assembly for the unification of their territory and that of the Republika Srpska Krajina with the Federal Republic of Yugoslavia deserved serious consideration. He indicated that the United Nations would first need to verify the status of the Republika Srpska and thereby provide international guarantees that the entity could unite with whomever they so chose.

In 1996, the DS joined with the Serbian Renewal Movement (Srpski pokret obnove, SPO) and other parties to form the Zajedno (English: Together) coalition. Bašić was elected to the Vojvodina assembly in the 1996 provincial election as a Zajendo candidate, winning in Novi Sad's fifteenth division.

Bašić was expelled from the DS on 19 August 1997 against the backdrop of divisions in the party. He was not a candidate for re-election to the national assembly in 1997 and was not re-elected to the provincial assembly in 2000.

=== Strength of Serbia Movement ===
Bašić returned in political life in 2004 as a member of Bogoljub Karić's Strength of Serbia Movement. He appeared in the lead position on the party's electoral list for the 2004 provincial election and received a mandate for the Vojvodina assembly after the list won four seats. He was also the PSS's candidate for mayor of Novi Sad in the concurrent 2004 Serbian local elections, finishing fourth against Serbian Radical Party candidate Maja Gojković. When the provincial assembly met, Bašić was chosen as one of its vice-presidents. He also served on the committee on administrative and mandate-immunity issues, the committee on economy, and the committee on education, science, culture, youth, and sports.

He appeared in the sixth position on the PSS's list in the 2007 Serbian parliamentary election. The list did not cross the electoral threshold to win representation in the assembly.

== Death ==
Bašic died on 19 November 2007 following a short illness.

== Electoral record ==
=== City of Novi Sad ===
2004 City of Novi Sad local election: Mayor of Novi Sad
Candidate	Party	First round		Second round	
Candidate	Party	Votes	%	Votes	%
Maja Gojković	Serbian Radical Party	44,013	42.65	60,235	50.29
Borislav Novaković (incumbent)	Democratic Party	34,300	33.24	59,540	49.71
Branislav Pomoriški	Together for Vojvodina	8,450	8.19		
Đorđe Bašić	Strength of Serbia Movement	5,243	5.08		
Dejan Mikavica	Democratic Party of Serbia	3,942	3.82		
Miodrag Isakov	Serbian Renewal Movement–Reformists of Vojvodina	3,556	3.45		
Miloš Tomić	G17 Plus	2,171	2.10		
Branislav Švonja	Community of Serbs of Croatia and Bosnia and Herzegovina	894	0.87		
Zoran Stojanović	New Serbia	628	0.61		
Total		103,197	100.00	119,775	100.00

=== National Assembly of Serbia ===
1990 Serbian parliamentary election: Novi Sad Division 1
Candidate	Party
Branko Andrić	Citizens' Group
Zoran Ašanin	Citizens' Group
Dr. Đorđe Bašić	Citizens' Group
Živko Gajić	People's Radical Party
Jovan Grupčić	Serbian Saint Sava Party
Prof. Dr. Stevan Jevtić	Serbian Renewal Movement
Prof. Dr. Dušan Jovanović	Democratic Party
Boris Kopilović	Party of Yugoslavs
Đorđe Kostić	Party of Independent Businessmen and Peasants
Prof. Dr. Božidar Milić	Serb Democratic Party
Petar Petrović (***WINNER***)	Union of Reform Forces of Yugoslavia for Vojvodina/Association for the Yugoslav Democratic Initiative
Jovan Soldatović	Socialist Party of Serbia
Prof. Dr. Ljubica Teslić-Nadlački	Citizens' Group
Petar Šušnjar	New Communist Movement
Stanko Šušnjar	Citizens' Group
Total
