= Vlatko Ratković =

Serbian politician

Vlatko Ratković (Serbian Cyrillic: Влатко Ратковић; born 25 August 1965) is a politician in Serbia. He served in the National Assembly of Serbia from 2007 to 2012 as a member of the Democratic Party (Demokratska stranka, DS) and is now a member of the breakaway Social Democratic Party (Socijaldemokratska stranka, SDS).

== Early life and career ==
Ratković was born in Šabac, in what was then the Socialist Republic of Serbia in the Socialist Federal Republic of Yugoslavia. He later moved to Ruma in the province of Vojvodina. He holds a Bachelor of Laws degree.

== Political career ==
Ratković sought election to the Assembly of Vojvodina in the 2004 provincial election in the single-member Ruma constituency. He was defeated in the second round of voting by Srđan Nikolić of the Serbian Radical Party.

=== Member of the National Assembly ===
Ratković received the 197th position on the DS's electoral list in the 2007 Serbian parliamentary election. The list won sixty-four seats. He was not initially included in his party's assembly delegation, but he received a mandate on 22 May 2007 as the replacement for another party member. (From 2000 to 2011, parliamentary mandates were awarded to sponsoring parties or coalitions rather than to individual candidates, and the mandates were often distributed out of numerical order. Ratković's position on the list had no bearing on whether – or when – he received a mandate.) The DS formed an unstable coalition government with the rival Democratic Party of Serbia (Demokratska stranka Srbije, DSS) after the election, and Ratković served as a supporter of the ministry.

The DS–DSS coalition fell apart in early 2008, and new elections were called. Ratković received the 184th position on the DS's For a European Serbia coalition list and was selected for a second term in the assembly when it won 102 seats. The election did not produce a clear winner; after extended negotiations, the For a European Serbia alliance formed a new coalition government with the Socialist Party of Serbia, and Ratković again served on the government side.

Ratković chaired the legislative committee in this sitting of parliament and in this capacity played a key role in passing the Statute of the Autonomous Province of Vojvodina. He defended the provincial constitution against charges that it was a separatist document in 2011, arguing that it was fully consistent with the Constitution of Serbia. In January 2012, he said that a central electronic database of Serbian law should be available within two years.

Serbia's electoral system was reformed in 2011, such that parliamentary mandates were awarded in numerical order to candidates on successful lists. Ratković received the ninety-seventh position on the DS's Choice for a Better Life list in the 2012 parliamentary election; the list won sixty-seven mandates, and he was not re-elected. He was subsequently appointed as assistant to the provincial secretary for energy and resources in the government of Vojvodina.

=== Member of the Social Democratic Party ===
The Democratic Party experienced a serious split in early 2014, with Boris Tadić setting up a breakaway group initially called the New Democratic Party. Ratković sided with Tadić and was accordingly dismissed from his government position on 6 February 2014; this decision was condemned by the new party. Tadić's party contested the 2014 parliamentary election in a fusion with the Greens of Serbia and in alliance with other parties. Ratković received the forty-first position on their electoral list; the list won eighteen mandates, and he was not returned. The New Democratic Party was reconstituted as the SDS later in the year.

For the 2016 parliamentary election, the SDS ran in an alliance with the Liberal Democratic Party and the League of Social Democrats of Vojvodina. Ratković received the sixty-seventh position on their combined list and was again not returned when it won only thirteen seats.

== Electoral record ==
=== Provincial (Vojvodina) ===
2004 Vojvodina provincial election: Ruma
Candidate	Party	First round		Second round	
Candidate	Party	Votes	%	Votes	%
Srđan Nikolić	Serbian Radical Party	4,863	33.30	8,884	64.74
Vlatko Ratković	Democratic Party–Boris Tadić	1,950	13.35	4,839	35.26
Smilja Lončar	Democratic Party of Serbia	1,767	12.10		
Milutin Stojković	Socialist Party of Serbia	1,642	11.24		
Ljiljana Avramović	G17 Plus	814	5.57		
Steva Lazarević	Together for Vojvodina–Nenad Čanak	728	4.98		
Milutin Živanović	Strength of Serbia Movement	709	4.85		
Jovan Adnađević	United Peasant Party	569	3.90		
Dušan Stojanac	Citizens' Group: Serbian People's Movement "Svetozar Miletić"	506	3.46		
Mile Dokmanović	Serbian Renewal Movement	408	2.79		
Julijana Golčevski	Coalition: One for the Municipality of Ruma (Social Democracy of Ruma, Reformists of Vojvodina–Social Democratic Party of Ruma, People's Peasant Party of Ruma, Workers and Pensioners Party–SRP Ruma)	336	2.30		
Milutin Trbović Miša	New Serbia–Union of Serbs of Vojvodina	312	2.14		
Total		14,604	100.00	13,723	100.00
Valid votes		14,604	96.04	13,723	97.69
Invalid/blank votes		602	3.96	324	2.31
Total votes		15,206	100.00	14,047	100.00
Registered voters/turnout		15,206	100.00	14,047	100.00
