= Srđan Nikolić (Serbian Radical Party politician) =

Serbian politician

Srđan Nikolić (Serbian Cyrillic: Срђан Николић; born 2 April 1959) is a Serbian former politician. Between 2000 and 2008, he was a parliamentarian at the federal, republican, and provincial levels and served as the mayor of Ruma in Vojvodina. Nikolić was a member of the far-right Serbian Radical Party (Srpska radikalna stranka, SRS) during his time as an elected official.

He is presumably not the same Srđan Nikolić who served as vice-president of the Assembly of the Community of Municipalities, Autonomous Province of Kosovo and Metohija in 2008 as a member of the SRS.

== Early life and career ==
According to his 2004 campaign literature, Nikolić was born in Ruma, in what was then the People's Republic of Serbia in the Federal People's Republic of Yugoslavia. He was raised in the community and later graduated from the University of Belgrade Faculty of Technology and Metallurgy, majoring in chemical engineering. At the time of the 2004 election, he was doing specialist work toward a master's degree in environmental protection from the same institution. He began working for the factory Ruma in 1988.

== Politician ==
=== Federal and republican parliamentarian (2000–06) ===
Nikolić joined the Radical Party in 1997. In the 2000 Yugoslavian parliamentary election, he was given the lead position on the party's electoral list in Sremska Mitrovica for the Chamber of Citizens (i.e., the lower house of the Yugoslavian parliament). Although the Radicals suffered a significant defeat overall, Nikolić was elected when the party narrowly won a single seat in the division.

Nikolić was also the Radical Party's candidate for Ruma's twenty-first division in the 2000 Serbian local elections, which were held concurrently with the Yugoslavian vote. Like all SRS candidates in the municipality in this cycle, he was defeated. He later appeared in the 208th position on the party's list for the 2000 Serbian parliamentary election, which was held in December of that year; the party won twenty-three seats, and he did not receive a mandate at the republic level. (From 2000 to 2011, mandates in Serbian parliamentary elections were awarded to candidates on successful lists at the discretion of the sponsoring parties or coalitions, and it was standard practice for the mandates to assigned out of numerical order. Nikolić could have received a mandate in the national assembly despite his list position, but he did not.)

In May 2002, the Yugoslavian parliament voted to reconstitute the Federal Republic of Yugoslavia as the State Union of Serbia and Montenegro. Nikolić was a vocal opponent of this change, arguing that the new union had been "imposed by the West" as "a plot to dismember Yugoslavia and nourish separatists." He was quoted as saying, "What the deal is offering is not a single country but two states, operating with different markets and currencies, and disguised as one country for the benefit of the West."

The new state union was formally established in February 2003, and the unicameral Assembly of Serbia and Montenegro was established as its legislative branch. The first members of this body were chosen by indirect election by the republican parliaments of Serbia and Montenegro, with each parliamentary group allowed representation proportional to its numbers. Only sitting members of the Serbian assembly or the Montenegrin assembly, or members of the Federal Assembly of Yugoslavia at the time of the country's reconstitution, were eligible to serve. Nikolić was not initially chosen for a seat in the new parliament.

He was given the forty-third position on the SRS's list in the 2003 Serbian parliamentary election and received a mandate when the list won eighty-two seats. His term in the national assembly was brief. By virtue of its performance in the election, the Radicals had the right to appoint thirty members to the assembly of Serbia and Montenegro; Nikolić was awarded a new federal mandate on 12 February 2004 and so resigned from the republican parliament.

The federal assembly ceased to exist in June 2006 when Montenegro declared independence. Nikolić received the 170th position on the SRS's list in the 2007 Serbian parliamentary election and was not given a mandate when the list won eighty-one seats.

=== Mayor and provincial representative (2004–08) ===
Serbia introduced the direct election of mayors prior to the 2004 Serbian local elections. Nikolić ran as the Radical Party's candidate in Ruma and was elected in the second round. The Radicals also won twenty out of forty-three seats in the local assembly and formed a local coalition government with the Democratic Party of Serbia (Demokratska stranka Srbije, DSS).

In the concurrent 2004 provincial election, Nikolić was elected to the Assembly of Vojvodina for the Ruma division. The Democratic Party (Demokratska stranka, DS) formed a coalition government at the provincial level, and the Radicals served in opposition.

In 2007, a coalition comprising the DS, the DSS, and other parties tried to form a new administration in Ruma. Nikolić did not recognize the validity of the coalition's claim to power, and for a time two rival governments co-existed in the municipality. The Serbian government established a temporary administration in April 2008, initially leaving Nikolić in the mayor's office. The 2008 local elections in the municipality did not produce a clear winner, and subsequent attempts to form a coalition government were unsuccessful. The Serbian government introduced another temporary administration in August 2008, and Nikolić's term in office came to an end. The DS won a repeat vote held later in the year.

Nikolić did not seek re-election to the Vojvodina assembly in the 2008 provincial election.

== After 2008 ==
Nikolić later became director of the public company "Stambeno". He was removed from office in 2019.

== Electoral record ==
=== Local (Ruma) ===
2004 Municipality of Ruma local election: Mayor of Ruma (second round results)
Candidate	Party	Votes	%
Srđan Nikolić	Serbian Radical Party	8,630	62.86
Snežana Nikolajević	Democratic Party	5,098	37.14
Total		13,728	100.00

=== Provincial (Vojvodina) ===
2004 Vojvodina provincial election: Ruma
Candidate	Party	First round		Second round	
Candidate	Party	Votes	%	Votes	%
Srđan Nikolić	Serbian Radical Party	4,863	33.30	8,884	64.74
Vlatko Ratković	Democratic Party–Boris Tadić	1,950	13.35	4,839	35.26
Smilja Lončar	Democratic Party of Serbia	1,767	12.10		
Milutin Stojković	Socialist Party of Serbia	1,642	11.24		
Ljiljana Avramović	G17 Plus	814	5.57		
Steva Lazarević	Together for Vojvodina–Nenad Čanak	728	4.98		
Milutin Živanović	Strength of Serbia Movement	709	4.85		
Jovan Adnađević	United Peasant Party	569	3.90		
Dušan Stojanac	Citizens' Group: Serbian People's Movement "Svetozar Miletić"	506	3.46		
Mile Dokmanović	Serbian Renewal Movement	408	2.79		
Julijana Golčevski	Coalition: One for the Municipality of Ruma (Social Democracy of Ruma, Reformists of Vojvodina–Social Democratic Party of Ruma, People's Peasant Party of Ruma, Workers and Pensioners Party–SRP Ruma)	336	2.30		
Milutin Trbović Miša	New Serbia–Union of Serbs of Vojvodina	312	2.14		
Total		14,604	100.00	13,723	100.00
Valid votes		14,604	96.04	13,723	97.69
Invalid/blank votes		602	3.96	324	2.31
Total votes		15,206	100.00	14,047	100.00
Registered voters/turnout		15,206	100.00	14,047	100.00
