= Dejan Mikavica =

Serbian politician and historian (1964–2022)

Dejan Mikavica (Serbian Cyrillic: Дејан Микавица; 12 August 1964 – 2 November 2022) was a Serbian politician and historian. He served in the National Assembly of Serbia from 2004 to 2007 as a member of the Democratic Party of Serbia (Demokratska stranka Srbije, DSS).

== Early life and career ==
Mikavica attended primary school in the Detelinara area of Novi Sad and finished high school in Sremski Karlovci. He received a bachelor's degree from the Department of History at the University of Novi Sad's Faculty of Philosophy, earned a master's degree at the University of Belgrade, and completed his Ph.D. at the University of Novi Sad, where he later worked as a professor. He was the chair of the university's History Department from 2004 to 2015 and later chaired the Board of Directors of the Museum of Vojvodina from 2016 until his death. Much of his academic work was focused on the activities of the Serbian political elite in the Austro-Hungarian Empire.

== Politician ==
=== Early years ===
In 2000, the DSS became part of the Democratic Opposition of Serbia (Demokratska opozicija Srbije, DOS), a broad and ideologically diverse coalition of parties opposed to the authoritarian rule of Slobodan Milošević. DOS candidate Vojislav Koštunica defeated Milošević in the 2000 Yugoslavian presidential election, a watershed moment in Serbian politics. The DOS also won several landslide victories in the concurrent 2000 Serbian local elections, including in Novi Sad. The DSS was initially part of the city's government after the election, but it broke with the DOS and moved into opposition in mid-2001. Shortly thereafter, Mikavica became chair of the party's board in the city. In this role, he aligned himself with national-conservative groups and was a vocal opponent of the remaining parties in the DOS administration. Some DSS members, including Dragan Maršićanin, were critical of his leadership.

=== Parliamentarian ===
Mikavica appeared in the twenty-third position on the DSS's electoral list in the 2003 Serbian parliamentary election and was awarded a mandate when the list won fifty-three seats. (From 2000 to 2011, mandates in Serbian parliamentary elections were awarded to sponsoring parties or coalitions rather than individual candidates, and it was common practice for the mandates to be assigned out of numerical order. Mikavica's list position had no formal bearing on his chances of election.) He took his seat when the new assembly met in January 2004.

The DSS became the dominant party in Serbia's coalition government after the election, and Mikavica served as a supporter of the administration. He was a member of the committee on constitutional affairs and the committee on European integration. He also chaired the management board of Srbijagas and was an advisor to the general director of SPC Vojvodina during this time.

=== 2004 elections ===
Mikavica appeared in the second position on the DSS's list for the Assembly of Vojvodina in the 2004 provincial election; the list won four mandates, and he was not afterward included in its assembly delegation. He was also the DSS's candidate for mayor of Novi Sad in the concurrent 2004 Serbian local elections and finished fifth against Serbian Radical Party (Srpska radikalna stranka, SRS) candidate Maja Gojković in the first round of voting. Over the objections of the DSS leadership, he endorsed Gojković in the second round. Following her narrow victory, he brought the DSS into a coalition with the SRS at the city level. The DSS leadership responded by dissolving the party's board in the city; notwithstanding this, the DSS delegates in the city assembly maintained their alliance with the Radicals for the term that followed.

=== Accident and departure from politics ===
On 3 September 2006, Mikavica was involved in a traffic accident that caused serious injuries to a pedestrian. He was later found guilty of causing the accident by running a red light, a verdict that was upheld on appeal. Mikavica denied the charge. During the legal proceedings of the case, it was discovered that Mikavica had received free use of SPC Vojvodina cars for private purposes and was driving such a car when the accident occurred. He resigned from his position as advisor to the general director of SPC Vojvodina in November 2006.

Mikavica was not a candidate in the 2007 parliamentary election and was expelled from the DSS later in the year. In 2009, he joined the Serbian Progressive Party (Srpska napredna stranka, SNS).

== Death ==
Mikavica died on 2 November 2022. Maja Gojković, who was by then a SNS cabinet minister in Serbia's government, sent a telegram of condolence.

== Electoral record ==
=== Local (Novi Sad) ===
2004 City of Novi Sad local election: Mayor of Novi Sad
Candidate	Party	First round		Second round	
Candidate	Party	Votes	%	Votes	%
Maja Gojković	Serbian Radical Party	44,013	42.65	60,235	50.29
Borislav Novaković (incumbent)	Democratic Party	34,300	33.24	59,540	49.71
Branislav Pomoriški	Together for Vojvodina	8,450	8.19		
Đorđe Bašić	Strength of Serbia Movement	5,243	5.08		
Dejan Mikavica	Democratic Party of Serbia	3,942	3.82		
Miodrag Isakov	Serbian Renewal Movement–Reformists of Vojvodina	3,556	3.45		
Miloš Tomić	G17 Plus	2,171	2.10		
Branislav Švonja	Community of Serbs of Croatia and Bosnia and Herzegovina	894	0.87		
Zoran Stojanović	New Serbia	628	0.61		
Total		103,197	100.00	119,775	100.00
