= Milenko Makivić =

Serbian politician

Milenko Makivić (Serbian Cyrillic: Миленко Макивић; born 25 February 1942) is a former Serbian politician. He served in the Assembly of Vojvodina from 2004 to 2008 as a member of the far-right Serbian Radical Party (SRS).

== Early life and private career ==
Makivić was born to a Serb family in the village of Lusići, Banja Luka, in what was then the fascist Independent State of Croatia. He received his early education in the municipality after the establishment of the Federal People's Republic of Yugoslavia.

He graduated from the University of Belgrade Faculty of Dental Medicine and later earned a master's degree from the Faculty of Medicine. He moved to Sremska Mitrovica in Vojvodina, Serbia, after receiving a job in the community.

Makivić spent three years working in medicine in Libya.

== Politician ==
Makivić was elected to the Vojvodina provincial assembly in the 2004 provincial election for the Sremska Mitrovica division. The Democratic Party (DS) and its allies won the election, and the Radicals served in opposition for the term that followed.

Makivić also ran for mayor of Sremska Mitrovica in the 2004 Serbian local elections and was defeated in the second round. He was elected in the concurrent municipal assembly election and served in opposition at that level as well.

He was not a candidate for re-election at either the provincial or municipal level in 2008.

== Electoral record ==
=== Provincial (Vojvodina) ===
2004 Vojvodina provincial election: Sremska Mitrovica
Candidate	Party	First round		Second round	
Candidate	Party	Votes	%	Votes	%
Milenko Makivić	Serbian Radical Party	6,871	27.87	11,602	51.77
Slavko Arbanas	Democratic Party of Serbia	3,983	16.16	10,809	48.23
Milenko Bogdanović	Democratic Party–Boris Tadić	3,658	14.84		
Dejan Konstantinović	Strength of Serbia Movement	2,599	10.54		
Vidosav Brnjašević	"Together for Vojvodina–Nenad Čanak"	1,630	6.61		
Branislav Isaković	G17 Plus	1,235	5.01		
Momir Đuričić	Citizens' Group: Serbian People's Movement "Svetozar Miletić"	1,106	4.49		
Slobodan Lukić	Socialist People's Party	981	3.98		
Jasna Mrdak	Coalition: Serbian Renewal Movement–Social Democracy	929	3.77		
Bojan Pantelić	Socialist Party of Serbia	908	3.68		
Branislav Baraksavić	Citizens' Group: Baraksavić	754	3.06		
Total		24,654	100.00	22,411	100.00
Valid votes		24,564	95.05	22,411	96.90
Invalid/blank votes		1,278	4.95	717	3.10
Total votes		25,842	100.00	23,128	100.00

=== Local (Sremska Mitrovica) ===
2004 Municipality of Sremska Mitrovica local election: Mayor of Sremska Mitrovica
Candidate	Party	First round		Second round	
Candidate	Party	Votes	%	Votes	%
Zoran Miščević	Democratic Party of Serbia			11,898	52.55
Milenko Makivić	Serbian Radical Party			10,745	47.45
other candidates					
Total				22,643	100.00
