= Dušan Jakovljev =

Serbian politician

Dušan Jakovljev (Serbian Cyrillic: Душан Јаковљев; born 30 July 1951) is a politician in Serbia. He has served in the Assembly of Vojvodina since 2012 and is currently a deputy speaker of the assembly. He is also a former member of the assembly of Yugoslavia and the executive council of Vojvodina. Jakovljev is a member of the League of Social Democrats of Vojvodina (LSV).

== Early life and private career ==
Jakovljev was born in the village of Srpski Itebej, Autonomous Province of Vojvodina, in what was then the People's Republic of Serbia in the Federal People's Republic of Yugoslavia. He was raised in Zrenjanin, studied sociology at the University of Belgrade, and then returned to Zrenjanin, where he became editor-in-chief of library editions at the city's library. He has overseen the Todor Manojlović and Borislav Mihajlović Mihiz funds for dramatic works and has been published in several periodicals.

== Political career ==
Jakovljev has been a prominent member of the LSV for many years. He has served on the party's main board since 1997, was its vice-president from 2001 to 2008, and currently serves as a member of its presidency. He has also been elected as the leader of the LSV's Zrenjanin municipal committee on four occasions.

He was a leading figure in local protests against the rule of Slobodan Milošević and his allies in early 2000.

Jakovljev was elected to the Chamber of Citizens in the Yugoslavian parliament in the 2000 Yugoslavian general election. For this election, the LSV participated in a broad coalition known as the Democratic Opposition of Serbia (DOS), consisting of parties opposed to Milošević's rule. Jakovljev received the second position on the DOS's electoral list in the Zrenjanin division. The list won two of Zrenjanin's five seats, and he was granted a mandate. (For the 2000 election, half of the mandates granted to lists that crossed the electoral threshold were awarded in numerical order, and the other half were awarded at the discretion of the sponsoring parties or coalitions. Jakovljev did not automatically receive a mandate by virtue of his position but was included the division's delegation all the same.) The DOS won a majority victory in the Chamber of Citizens election, and Jakovljev served as the leader of the "Vojvodina" parliamentary group in the assembly.

The Federal Republic of Yugoslavia was re-constituted as the State Union of Serbia and Montenegro in 2003, with a new unicameral assembly. The first members of this assembly were selected via indirect election by the republican parliaments of Serbia and Montenegro; only serving members of the republican parliaments or outgoing members of the previous federal parliament were eligible. Jakovljev was chosen as one of the DOS's delegates, and was subsequently chosen as a substitute member in Serbia's delegation to the Parliamentary Assembly of the Council of Europe (PACE), where he served on the committee on science, culture, and education, and the committee on environmental protection and local and regional issues. In September 2003, he was also elected by the Vojvodina provincial assembly as deputy chair of the executive council of Vojvodina (i.e., the provincial government, as it was known at the time).

Jakovljev subsequently appeared as a candidate on the LSV's Together for Tolerance list in the 2003 Serbian parliamentary election. The list failed to cross the electoral threshold to win any mandates; as a consequence, the LSV lost its representation in both the National Assembly of Serbia and the Assembly of Serbia and Montenegro. Jakovljev's terms in both the federal assembly and PACE accordingly came to an end in early 2004.

Jakovljev was elected to the Assembly of Vojvodina in the 2004 provincial election. At this time, half of the seats in the Vojvodina assembly were determined by election in single-member constituency seats and the other half by proportional representation. Jakovljev appeared on the LSV's Together for Vojvodina electoral list and was awarded a mandate when the list won six proportional seats. (During this period, list mandates were awarded at the discretion of the sponsoring parties and coalitions; Jakovljev's numerical position on the list had no bearing on his selection for a mandate.) He did not ultimately serve in the legislature, however, instead declining his mandate to allow Bojan Kostreš to enter the assembly in his place. He was appointed to a second term as the vice-president of Vojvodina's executive council on 30 October 2004 and served in this role for the next four years.

He received the twenty-ninth position on the Together for Vojvodina list in the 2008 provincial election. He was not awarded an assembly mandate but was instead appointed to a third term as vice-president of the executive council, which was renamed and restructured after the election as the provincial government of Vojvodina. He served until 2012.

The electoral systems of Serbia and Vojvodina were reformed in 2011, such that list mandates were awarded in numerical order to candidates on successful lists. Jakovljev received the fifth position on the LSV's list in the 2012 provincial election and was elected when the list won eight mandates. On this occasion, he stood down from the provincial government and took his seat in the assembly, where he was chosen as one of five deputy speakers. The LSV continued participating in Vojvodina's coalition government, and Jakovljev served as a supporter of the ministry.

Jakovljev was elected to a second term in the Vojvodina Assembly in the 2016 provincial election; he received the fourth position on the LSV list and was re-elected when the list won nine mandates. The Serbian Progressive Party and its allies won the election, and the LSV moved into opposition. Jakovljev was again chosen as a deputy speaker. (Jakovljev was also a candidate in the concurrent 2016 Serbian parliamentary election, which the LSV contested in alliance with the Social Democratic Party and the Liberal Democratic Party, but he appeared in too low a position on the list for election to be a realistic possibility.)
