= Vlado Babić =

Serbian politician

Vlado Babić (Serbian Cyrillic: Владо Бабић; born 1960) is a politician in Serbia from the country's Bunjevac community. He has served in the National Assembly of Serbia since 2014 as a member of the Serbian Progressive Party.

== Private career ==
Babić is a medical doctor educated at the University of Novi Sad and based in Sombor in the Autonomous Province of Vojvodina. He was a member of the National Council of the Bunjevac National Minority from 2002 to 2010, at a time when council members were chosen by indirect election. He received the eleventh position on an electoral list led by council president Suzana Kujundžić Ostojić in the 2014 national council election; the list won only four seats, and he was not returned for a new term.

== Political career ==
Babić contested Sombor's first electoral division in the 2004 Vojvodina provincial election as a candidate of a local organization called the Convention for Sombor. He ran for the same seat in the 2008 provincial elections as a candidate of the Serbian Radical Party. He was not elected on either occasion. The Radical Party split following the 2008 elections, and Babić joined the breakaway Progressive Party.

Babić became a member of the Serbian parliament shortly after the 2014 parliamentary election, in which he received the 164th position on the Progressive Party's Aleksandar Vučić — Future We Believe In list. The list won a landslide victory with 158 seats out of 250; Babić, who narrowly missed winning election outright, was able to take his seat on May 10, 2014, after members further up the list resigned to take government positions. He was promoted to the 118th position on the Progressive Party's list (renamed as Aleksandar Vučić – Serbia Is Winning) in the 2016 election and was declared elected when the alliance won a second consecutive landslide victory with 131 mandates.

In 2015, while serving as chair of the legislative committee on reproductive health, he chaired a panel discussion on the treatment of cervical cancer. He is currently a member of the committee on the diaspora and Serbs in the region; a member of the committee on labour, social issues, social inclusion, and poverty reduction; a deputy member of the health and family committee; and a member of the parliamentary friendship groups for Belarus, Croatia, Cyprus, Greece, Hungary, Israel, Italy, Kazakhstan, Russia, Slovakia, and Tunisia.

Babić joined the parliamentary group of the Alliance of Vojvodina Hungarians (Vajdasági Magyar Szövetség; VMSZ) in early 2020. This allowed the VMSZ to maintain official parliamentary status after another delegate had left the group. Babić remains a member of the Progressive Party.

He was not a candidate for re-election in the 2020 Serbian parliamentary election.

== Electoral record ==
=== Provincial (Vojvodina) ===
2008 Vojvodina assembly election Sombor I (constituency seat) - First and Second Rounds
Branislav Bojić	For a European Vojvodina: Democratic Party–G17 Plus, Boris Tadić	8,979	37.39	11,208	76.77
Vlado Babić	Serbian Radical Party	5,781	24.07	3,391	23.23
Čaba Sakač	Hungarian Coalition–István Pásztor	3,002	12.50		
Milorad Veljović	Democratic Party of Serbia	2,101	8.75		
Stipan Ivanković	Coalition: Together for Vojvodina - Nenad Čanak	1,852	7.71		
Boris Bakić	Liberal Democratic Party	1,298	5.40		
Slavomir Ćirić	Socialist Party of Serbia–Party of United Pensioners of Serbia	583	2.43		
Milan Nikolić	Roma Union of Serbia	420	1.75		
Total valid votes		24,016	100	14,599	100
Invalid ballots		399		219	
Total votes casts		24,915	60.55	14,818	36.01

2004 Vojvodina assembly election Sombor I (constituency seat) - First and Second Rounds
Milan Aleksić	Democratic Party of Serbia	2,544	18.42	8,851	68.49
Nikola Pejović	Serbian Radical Party	2,052	14.86	4,072	31.51
Zlatko Miličević	Democratic Party	1,890	13.68		
Eržebet Karher	Democratic Fellowship of Vojvodina Hungarians	1,654	11.98		
Aleksandar Bošnjak	G17 Plus	1,461	10.58		
Vlado Babić	Convention for Sombor	858	6.21		
Zvonimir Štrbac	Coalition: Together for Vojvodina–Nenad Čanak	687	4.97		
Ladislav Fekete	Social Democracy	589	4.26		
Ivica Frgić	Zajedno–Miodrag Sekulić, SPO–NDS	551	3.99		
Petar Relić Saka (incumbent)	For Truth and Justice, Without Deception–Petar Relić-Saka: Democratic Party of Vojvodina–Party of Free Patriots–Christian Democratic Party of Serbia–Labour Party of Serbia	535	3.87		
Jozo Ilić	Civic Movement of Vojvodina	513	3.71		
Zdenka Osterman	Strength of Serbia Movement	477	3.45		
Total valid votes		13,811	100	12,923	100
Invalid ballots		625		438	
Total votes casts		14,436	35.93	13,361	33.25
