= Marija Radojčić =

Serbian politician and entrepreneur

Marija Radojčić (Serbian Cyrillic: Марија Радојчић; born 1982) is a politician and entrepreneur in Serbia. She served in the Assembly of Vojvodina from 2008 to 2012 as a member of the League of Social Democrats of Vojvodina (LSV).

== Early life and private career ==
Radojčić was born in Jazak, a village in the municipality of Irig, in what was then the Socialist Autonomous Province of Vojvodina in the Socialist Republic of Serbia in the Socialist Federal Republic of Yugoslavia. She attended the University of Novi Sad, graduating as an economist. Along with her family, she oversees a small farm and markets a brand of cheese called Friški jazački sirevi, which has received a citation from the Balkan Cheese Festival. She has also sponsored a series of "Business Café" events and has worked to promote female entrepreneurship and rural tourism.

== Political career ==
Radojčić was elected to the Assembly of Vojvodina in the 2008 provincial election. She received the fortieth position on the LSV's Together for Vojvodina electoral list; the list was five proportional mandates, and she was subsequently chosen as one of her party's delegates. (Until 2012, mandates were distributed to candidates on successful lists at the discretion of the sponsoring party or coalition, and it was common practice for the mandates to be awarded out of numerical order; Radojčić's position on the list had no bearing on whether or not she received a mandate.) The LSV participated in Vojvodina's executive council during this period, and Radojčić served as a supporter of the executive. During her time in the assembly, she was noted for working on projects related to the advancement of women's rights in the province.

She sought re-election in the 2012 provincial election as a candidate in the single-member Irig constituency seat and was not returned. Vojvodina subsequently abolished its constituency seats and adopted a system of pure proportional representation, with mandates awarded in numerical order to candidates on successful lists. Radojčić received the forty-fifth position on the LSV's list in the 2016 provincial election and was not elected when the list won nine mandates. She was also a LSV candidate in the 2012, 2014, and 2016 Serbian parliamentary elections, though she was not elected on any of these occasions.

Radojčić has also served in the Irig municipal assembly. In 2007, she was a spokesperson for the municipality in talks with UNESCO over designating Fruška Gora as a World Heritage Site.

== Electoral record ==
=== Provincial (Vojvodina) ===
2012 Vojvodina provincial election: Irig
Candidate	Party	First round		Second round	
Candidate	Party	Votes	%	Votes	%
Ilija Ćosić	"Choice for a Better Vojvodina–Bojan Pajtic" (Affiliation: Democratic Party)	1,641	29.05	2,777	60.57
Dr. Branka Solomunović	Let's Get Vojvodina Moving–Tomislav Nikolić (Serbian Progressive Party, New Serbia, Movement of Socialists, Strength of Serbia Movement)	1,041	18.43	1,808	39.43
Marija Radojčić (list incumbent)	League of Social Democrats of Vojvodina–Nenad Čanak	764	13.52		
Radovan Ninković (incumbent)	Socialist Party of Serbia (SPS), Party of United Pensioners of Serbia (PUPS), United Serbia (JS), Social Democratic Party of Serbia (SDP Serbia)	683	12.09		
Slobodan Radojčić	U-Turn for the Municipality of Irig (Liberal Democratic Party, Serbian Renewal Movement)	550	9.74		
Stevan Ivković	Serbian Radical Party	530	9.38		
Fedor Pušić	United Regions of Serbia–Mlađan Dinkić	440	7.79		
Total		5,649	100.00	4,585	100.00
