= Dejan Čapo =

Serbian politician

Dejan Čapo Дејан Чапо

Member of the National Assembly of the Republic of Serbia
- In office 2014–2016

Member of the Assembly of the Autonomous Province of Vojvodina
- Incumbent
- Assumed office 2016
- In office 2004–2008

Personal details
- Born: 5 February 1978 (age 48) Zrenjanin, SAP Vojvodina, SR Serbia, SFR Yugoslavia
- Party: League of Social Democrats of Vojvodina (since 1998)

Dejan Čapo (Serbian Cyrillic: Дејан Чапо; born 5 February 1978) is a politician in Serbia. He is currently serving his second term in the Assembly of Vojvodina as a member of the League of Social Democrats of Vojvodina (LSV). He also served in the National Assembly of Serbia from 2014 to 2016 and leads the LSV group in the Zrenjanin municipal assembly.

== Early life and career ==
Čapo was born in Zrenjanin, Vojvodina, in what was then the Socialist Republic of Serbia in the Socialist Federal Republic of Yugoslavia. He was raised in the city and began working at the Technical Faculty in Zrenjanin in 2003. From 2008 to 2012, he was the leader of Zrenjanin's public housing corporation.

== Political career ==
Čapo joined the LSV in his twenties and was included on the party's Together for Tolerance electoral list in the 2003 Serbian parliamentary election. The list did not cross the electoral threshold to win representation in the National Assembly. He was subsequently included on the LSV's Together for Vojvodina list in the 2004 provincial election, in which half the seats were determined by a system of proportional representation. While not initially selected for his party's delegation, he received a mandate on 22 December 2004 to replace a member who had left the assembly. The LSV was a part of Vojvodina's coalition government in the parliament that followed and Čapo served as a supporter of the ministry. He sought re-election in the 2008 provincial election, receiving the eighth position on the Together for Vojvodina list; the list won five mandates, and he did not serve in the sitting of the assembly that followed.

He sought election to the National Assembly for a second time in the 2007 Serbian parliamentary election, on which he was awarded the 244th position out of 250 on a combined list of the LSV, the Liberal Democratic Party (LDP), and other parties. The list won fifteen seats, and he was not selected for a mandate. (From 2000 to 2011, Serbian parliamentary mandates were awarded to sponsoring parties or coalitions rather than to individual candidates, and it was common practice for the mandates to be awarded out of numerical order. Čapo could have been awarded a mandate despite his low position on the list – which was in any event mostly alphabetical – though in fact he was not.)

Serbia's electoral system was reformed in 2011, such that parliamentary mandates were awarded in numerical order to candidates on successful lists. The LSV contested the 2014 Serbian parliamentary election on the coalition list of former Serbian president Boris Tadić. The list won eighteen mandates; Čapo, who received the eightieth position, was not initially elected. He was, however, awarded a mandate on 10 May 2014, as the next LSV candidate on the list, following the resignation of Marinika Tepić. For the next two years, he served with the LSV in opposition to Aleksandar Vučić's administration.

Čapo was awarded the twenty-third position on a coalition list that included the LSV, the LDP, and the Social Democratic Party in the 2016 Serbian parliamentary election. The list won thirteen mandates, and he was not elected. He is currently the third LSV candidate on the list with the right to accept a mandate if another member elected for the party leaves the assembly. Čapo also received the tenth position on the LSV's list in the concurrent 2016 Vojvodina provincial election and, as the list won nine mandates, narrowly missed direct election. He received a mandate for a second term on 24 April 2016, however, when party leader Nenad Čanak declined his election to the provincial assembly to serve another term in the National Assembly. The Serbian Progressive Party and its allies won majorities in both the republic and provincial elections, and Čapo once again serves in opposition.

He has also been elected to several terms in the Zrenjanin municipal assembly, where he is the leader of the LSV group. In March 2018, he spoke against a suggestion by the municipal government to rename the city.
