= Petar Petrović (Serbian politician, born 1955) =

Serbian journalist and politician

Petar Petrović (Serbian Cyrillic: Петар Петровић; born 5 May 1955) is a Serbian journalist and politician. He was a member of the Serbian parliament from 1991 to 1993 and a deputy speaker of the Novi Sad city assembly from 2000 to 2004. Petrović was for many years a member of the Union of Reform Forces of Yugoslavia (SRSJ) and the successor Reformist Democratic Party of Vojvodina (RDSV), which was renamed as the Reformists of Vojvodina (RV) in 2000. In 2021, he joined the Movement for Reversal (PzP).

== Early life and career ==
In a 2021 Facebook post, PzP leader Janko Veselinović noted that Petrović was born in Sremska Mitrovica, in what was then the Autonomous Province of Vojvodina in the People's Republic of Serbia, Federal People's Republic of Yugoslavia. Petrović graduated from the University of Belgrade Faculty of Political Sciences and began working at TV Novi Sad in 1981, later becoming editor for its documentary section and editor-in-chief of its news program.

Petrović was fired as editor-in-chief of TV Novi Sad in 1990, at a time when Slobodan Milošević was establishing his authoritarian rule over Serbia.

== Politician ==
=== Member of the National Assembly (1991–93) ===
Petrović joined Yugoslavian prime minister Ante Marković's Union of Reform Forces of Yugoslavia when multi-party politics was re-introduced to Serbia in 1990. He was elected to Serbia's national assembly in the 1990 Serbian parliamentary election, winning in Novi Sad's first division. The overall results of the election were disappointing for Marković's party, which won only two seats in total. Milošević's Socialist Party of Serbia (SPS) won a majority victory, and Petrović served in opposition when the assembly convened in 1991. He often spoke on media freedom and related issues, and some of his speeches were published in pamphlet form. In 1992, the Vojvodina branch of the Union of Reform Forces was restructured as the Reformist Democratic Party of Vojvodina.

During the 1991–93 parliament, the Socialist Federal Republic of Yugoslavia (SFRY) collapsed, and the Yugoslav Wars of the 1990s began. In April 1992, the republics of Serbia and Montenegro established the new Federal Republic of Yugoslavia (FRY), and the first elections for the new federal parliament were scheduled for the following month. Petrović said that the RDSV's participation in the elections was conditional on international recognition of the new state. Ultimately, the FRY was not permitted to join the United Nations (UN) due to the insistence by Slobodan Milošević and his allies that it be recognized as the legal successor to the SFRY. Most opposition parties, including the RDSV, boycotted the May 1992 Yugoslavian parliamentary election.

The 1990 Serbian parliamentary election was the last in which members were elected for single-member constituencies; all parliamentary elections since this time have taken place under proportional representation. In 1992, Serbia adopted a system wherein one third of the assembly mandates were assigned to candidates on successful lists in numerical order and the remaining two thirds were assigned to other candidates at the discretion of the sponsoring parties or coalitions. The RDSV contested the 1992 Serbian parliamentary election in the Novi Sad division in an alliance with the Democratic Party (DS), and Petrović appeared in the fourth position on their combined list. The alliance won two seats in the division; the lead candidate was automatically elected, and the "optional" mandate was assigned to the second candidate. Petrović's term ended when the new assembly convened in January 1993.

The RDSV contested the 1993 Serbian parliamentary election as part of the Democratic Coalition for Vojvodina, which also included the League of Social Democrats of Vojvodina (LSV) and the Party of Yugoslavs (SJ). Petrović appeared in the third position on their list for Novi Sad. The list did not cross the electoral threshold for assembly representation.

=== Novi Sad city politician (2000–04) ===
After withdrawing from active political life for a time, Petrović became re-engaged with the RDSV in 1998. The party, renamed as the Reformists of Vojvodina, joined the Democratic Opposition of Serbia (DOS) in 2000. The DOS was a broad and ideologically diverse coalition of parties opposed to the continued rule of Slobodan Milošević and his allies.

Milošević faced a significant challenge from DOS candidate Vojislav Koštunica in the 2000 Yugoslavian presidential election. After the first round, the federal election commission ruled that Koštunica had fallen just short of the majority he needed to win outright and avoid a runoff vote with Milošević. Opposition leaders charged electoral fraud, claiming that Koštunica had received more than fifty-two per cent of the vote. This led to a standoff between government and opposition forces.

The Yugoslavian presidential election took place concurrently with the 2000 Serbian local elections, in which Petrović was elected to the Novi Sad city assembly as a DOS candidate. Interviewed by The New York Times after the vote, he called for Serbians to rise up collectively in order to bring down Milošević and his allies. He dismissed calls for a general strike by saying, "The idea of telling people to stop work and drink coffee is funny here. That's all anyone has been doing for 10 years!" He instead called for the blocking of roads and cities. Milošević's government ultimately fell from power on 5 October 2000 in the face of mass protests.

The DOS coalition won a landslide victory in Novi Sad in the 2000 local elections, taking fifty-nine out of seventy seats. After the election, Petrović was chosen as one of the deputy speakers of the assembly.

The DOS subsequently dissolved, and the Reformists of Vojvodina contested the 2003 Serbian parliamentary election in an alliance with the Social Democratic Party of Vojvodina. Petrović appeared in the fourth position on their coalition list, which did not cross the threshold for assembly representation. The Reformists later contested the 2004 Serbian local elections as part of the Clean Hands of Novi Sad coalition, which fell just below the threshold. Petrović's term in the city assembly ended in 2004.

In 2010, Petrović argued for Vojvodina to be designated as a federal unit within the Republic of Serbia and for the Serbian constitution to be amended to permit this outcome.

=== Movement for Reversal ===
Petrović joined the Movement for Reversal in 2021. In January 2022, he became a member of its political council.

== Electoral Record ==
=== National Assembly of Serbia ===
1990 Serbian parliamentary election: Novi Sad Division 1
Candidate	Party
Branko Andrić	Citizens' Group
Zoran Ašanin	Citizens' Group
Dr. Đorđe Bašić	Citizens' Group
Živko Gajić	People's Radical Party
Jovan Grupčić	Serbian Saint Sava Party
Prof. Dr. Stevan Jevtić	Serbian Renewal Movement
Prof. Dr. Dušan Jovanović	Democratic Party
Boris Kopilović	Party of Yugoslavs
Đorđe Kostić	Party of Independent Businessmen and Peasants
Prof. Dr. Božidar Milić	Serb Democratic Party
Petar Petrović (***WINNER***)	Union of Reform Forces of Yugoslavia for Vojvodina/Association for the Yugoslav Democratic Initiative
Jovan Soldatović	Socialist Party of Serbia
Prof. Dr. Ljubica Teslić-Nadlački	Citizens' Group
Petar Šušnjar	New Communist Movement
Stanko Šušnjar	Citizens' Group
Total
