= Miladin Kalinić =

Serbian politician

Miladin Kalinić (Serbian Cyrillic: Миладин Калинић; born 22 June 1951) is a Serbian politician. During the 1990s, he served two terms as mayor of Sremski Karlovci and two terms in the Vojvodina provincial assembly. Since 2024, he has been the president of the Sremski Karlovci municipal assembly. A member of the Socialist Party of Serbia (SPS) for most of his political career, Kalinić joined the Serbian Progressive Party (SNS) prior to the 2024 Serbian local elections.

== Private career ==
Kalinić graduated as a technological engineer in 1976 and earned a master's degree in 2007. In 2011, he began working at the College of Professional Studies for Management and Business Communications in Sremski Karlovci. Kalinić has also led tourism organizations at the local and republican levels.

== Politician ==
=== League of Communists of Serbia ===
Kalinić began his political career as a member of the League of Communists of Serbia (SKS), when the country was a one-party socialist state. In January 1990, he was one of a number of prominent SKS members in the Novi Sad area who accused the League of Communists of Slovenia (ZKS) leadership of deliberately fomenting a split in the federal League of Communists of Yugoslavia (SKJ) and of encouraging separatist currents in the country.

Later in 1990, the SKS transformed itself into the Socialist Party of Serbia, which dominated Serbian politics over the next decade under the leadership of Slobodan Milošević.

=== SPS elected official in the 1990s ===
Kalinić was first elected to the Vojvodina assembly for the Sremski Karlovci constituency in the May 1992 provincial election. The Socialists won a majority victory in this election, due in part to an opposition boycott, and Kalinić served as a supporter of the provincial administration. Due to ongoing skepticism about the legitimacy of the vote, a new provincial election was held in December 1992; Kalinić was not a candidate for re-election.

Kalinić was elected to the Sremski Karlovci municipal assembly in the December 1992 Serbian local elections, which took place concurrently with the provincial vote. When the assembly convened in early 1993, Lazar Crnojački was chosen as its president (a position that was then equivalent to mayor), and Kalinić was chosen as president of its executive committee.

In the 1993 Serbian parliamentary election, Kalinić appeared in the twenty-eighth position (out of twenty-eight) on the Socialist Party's electoral list for the Novi Sad division. The list won thirteen seats, and he did not receive a mandate. (From 1992 to 2000, Serbia's electoral law stipulated that one-third of parliamentary mandates would be assigned to candidates from successful lists in numerical order, while the remaining two-thirds would be distributed amongst other candidates at the discretion of the sponsoring parties. Kalinić could have been given a mandate despite his list position, but this did not occur.)

By 1995, Kalinić had succeeded Crnojački as mayor of Sremski Karlovci. In June 1996, he participated in a delegation of the Standing Conference of Cities and Municipalities of Yugoslavia on a week-long visit to Moscow.

Kalinić was re-elected to the Sremski Karlovci assembly in the 1996 Serbian local elections. The Socialists won a majority victory in the municipality with fifteen out of twenty-five seats, and he was chosen afterward for another term as mayor. He was also elected to a second term in the Vojvodina assembly in the 1996 provincial election and once again served as a government supporter when the Socialists won a majority victory.

In October 1997, Kalinić signed a comprehensive environmental protocol for Sremski Karlovci with Jordan Aleksić, Serbia's minister of environmental protection.

Serbia's longtime leader Slobodan Milošević was defeated in the 2000 Yugoslavian presidential election and fell from power on 5 October 2000, a watershed moment in Serbian politics. In the concurrent 2000 Yugoslavian parliamentary election, Kalinić appeared in the fourth position (out of four) on a combined Socialist Party of Serbia–Yugoslav Left (JUL) list for the Chamber of Citizens in the Novi Sad division. The list won only one seat, which was automatically assigned to its lead candidate, Živko Šoklovački.

A local alliance known as the United Democratic Opposition of Sremski Karlovci won a majority of seats in the municipality in the 2000 Serbian local elections, and Kalinić's term as mayor ended shortly thereafter. Online sources do not clarify if he was personally re-elected to the assembly. He was not re-elected to the Vojvodina assembly in the 2000 provincial election; available online sources do not clarify if he was a candidate.

=== Since 2000 ===
After 2000, Serbia introduced a system of proportional representation for local elections. In 2004, the offices of mayor and assembly president were separated.

Kalinić ran for the Sremski Karlovci constituency seat in the 2008 Vojvodina provincial election as a candidate of the independent "Karlovci Initiative" group. He was eliminated in the first round of voting. The "Karlovci Initiative" won a single seat in Sremski Karlovci in the concurrent 2008 Serbian local elections, although available online sources do not indicate if Kalinić was the candidate elected.

Kalinić later became reconciled with the Socialist Party, appeared in the second position on the party's list for Sremski Karlovci in the 2012 Serbian local elections, and was re-elected to the local assembly when the list won two seats. He appeared in the same position on the party's list for the 2016 local elections and was not elected when the list fell to a single seat.

Prior to the 2024 Serbian local elections, Kalinić joined the Serbian Progressive Party. He appeared in the sixth position on the party's coalition list for Sremski Karlovci in that year and was re-elected to the municipal assembly when the list won a majority victory with fourteen seats. When the assembly convened in July 2024, Kalinić was chosen for another term as assembly president.

== Electoral record ==
=== Provincial (Vojvodina) ===
2008 Vojvodina provincial election: Sremski Karlovci
Candidate	Party	First round		Second round	
Candidate	Party	Votes	%	Votes	%
Milenko Filipović	"For a European Vojvodina, Democratic Party–G17 Plus, Boris Tadić" (Affiliation: G17 Plus)	2,305	48.50	1,928	72.51
Novo Simović	Serbian Radical Party	925	19.46	731	27.49
Stanko Dimić	Socialist Party of Serbia (SPS)–Party of United Pensioners of Serbia (PUPS)	426	8.96		
Miladin Kalinić	Citizens' Group: Karlovci Initiative	419	8.82		
Živko Miljević	Coalition: Together for Vojvodina-Nenad Čanak	358	7.53		
Đorđe Kolarović	Democratic Party of Serbia	320	6.73		
Total		4,753	100.00	2,659	100.00
Valid votes		4,753	97.84	2,659	98.70
Invalid/blank votes		105	2.16	35	1.30
Total votes		4,858	100.00	2,694	100.00

1996 Vojvodina provincial election: Sremski Karlovci
Candidate	Party	Votes	%
Miladin Kalinić	Socialist Party of Serbia		elected
other candidates			
Total			

May 1992 Vojvodina provincial election: Sremski Karlovci
Candidate	Party	Votes	%
Miladin Kalinić	Socialist Party of Serbia		elected
other candidates?			
Total			
