= Milenko Filipović =

Serbian politician

Milenko Filipović (Serbian Cyrillic: Миленко Филиповић; born 12 March 1953) is a politician in Serbia. He was the mayor of Sremski Karlovci from 2004 to 2016 and was also a member of the Assembly of Vojvodina from 2008 to 2011. At different times in his career, Filipović was a member of G17 Plus and the Democratic Party (Demokratska stranka, DS).

== Early life and career ==
Filipović was born in Sremski Karlovci, Autonomous Province of Vojvodina, in what was then the People's Republic of Serbia in the Federal People's Republic of Yugoslavia. He is a graduate of the University of Novi Sad's Faculty of Law and has served as a judge on the municipal court in Novi Sad. He began practicing law in 1991.

== Politician ==
=== Local politics ===
Serbia introduced the direct election of mayors at the 2004 local elections. Filipović was elected as mayor of Sremski Karlovci in the second round of voting, after receiving endorsements from G17 plus, the DS, the Democratic Party of Serbia (Demokratska stranka Sribje, DSS), and the Serbian Renewal Movement. He became a member of G17 Plus either before or shortly after the election.

Filipović appeared in the 235th position out of 250 on G17 Plus's electoral list in the 2007 Serbian parliamentary election. The list won nineteen mandates, and he was not chosen as part of his party's assembly delegation. (From 2000 to 2011, parliamentary mandates in Serbia were awarded to sponsoring parties or coalitions rather than to individual candidates, and it was common practice for the mandates to be distributed out of numerical order. Filipović could have received a mandate notwithstanding his position on the list, which was in any event mostly alphabetical.)

The direct election of mayors was abandoned after the 2004 election; since that time, mayors in Serbia have been chosen by the elected members of city and municipal assemblies. In the 2008 local elections, Filipović led the For a European Serbia alliance, which included the DS and G17 Plus, to a majority victory in Sremski Karlovci with fifteen out of twenty-five mandates. He was chosen for a second term as mayor afterwards. Following the election, he left G17 Plus and joined the DS.

Filopović led the DS's electoral list to a plurality victory with eight seats in the 2012 local elections and was subsequently confirmed for a third term in office. In October 2013, he brought the rival Serbian Progressive Party into the municipal governing alliance.

He led his own independent list in the 2016 Serbian local elections. The list won five seats, finishing second against the Progressives. After the election, a candidate of the Progressive Party was chosen as the municipality's new mayor. Filipović was not a candidate for re-election to the municipal assembly in 2020.

=== Provincial politics ===
While serving as mayor, Filipović was also elected to the Assembly of Vojvodina in the 2008 provincial election in the Sremski Karlovci division as a candidate of the For a European Vojvodina alliance. For a European Vojvodina won an outright majority in the election, and Filipović served as a supporter of the administration. He resigned from the assembly on 7 December 2011, after restrictions were introduced on holding dual mandates.

== Electoral record ==
=== Provincial (Vojvodina) ===
2008 Vojvodina provincial election: Sremski Karlovci
Candidate	Party	First round		Second round	
Candidate	Party	Votes	%	Votes	%
Milenko Filipović	"For a European Vojvodina, Democratic Party–G17 Plus, Boris Tadić" (Affiliation: G17 Plus)	2,305	48.50	1,928	72.51
Novo Simović	Serbian Radical Party	925	19.46	731	27.49
Stanko Dimić	Socialist Party of Serbia (SPS)–Party of United Pensioners of Serbia (PUPS)	426	8.96		
Miladin Kalinić	Citizens' Group: Karlovci Initiative	419	8.82		
Živko Miljević	Coalition: Together for Vojvodina-Nenad Čanak	358	7.53		
Đorđe Kolarović	Democratic Party of Serbia	320	6.73		
Total		4,753	100.00	2,659	100.00
Valid votes		4,753	97.84	2,659	98.70
Invalid/blank votes		105	2.16	35	1.30
Total votes		4,858	100.00	2,694	100.00

=== Municipal (Sremski Karlovci) ===
2004 Sremski Karlovci municipal election Mayor of Sremski Karlovci – Second Round Results
Candidate	Party or Coalition	Votes	%
Milenko Filipović	Coalition: G17 Plus–DS–DSS–SPO	1,278	53.29
Branislav Pop Jovanov	Citizens' Group: Non-Partisan Citizens of Sremski Karlovci	1,120	46.71
Total valid votes		2,398	100
