= Stevan Kesejić =

Serbian politician (born 1944)

Stevan Kesejić (Serbian Cyrillic: Стеван Кесејић; born 27 September 1944) is a politician in Serbia. Based in Sombor, Vojvodina, he has served several terms in the federal, republican, provincial, and local parliaments over the course of his career. Kesejić is a member of the far-right Serbian Radical Party (Srpska radikalna stranka, SRS).

== Private career ==
Kesejić was born in Sombor, at a time when the Axis occupation of Vojvodina was ending and the Partisans were establishing their rule in the area. He is a technologist in private life. According to a 1996 party biography, he developed an international reputation as a specialist in drying and finishing seed corn and was invited on several occasions to Germany, Kazakhstan, and Spain as an expert in the field.

== Politician ==
Kesejić appeared in the twenty-first position on the Radical Party's list for Novi Sad in the 1992 Serbian parliamentary election. The party won ten seats in the division, and he was not included in its assembly delegation. (From 1992 to 2000, Serbia's electoral law stipulated that one-third of parliamentary mandates would be assigned to candidates from successful lists in numerical order, while the remaining two-thirds would be distributed amongst other candidates at the discretion of the sponsoring parties. It was common practice for the latter mandates to be awarded out of order. Kesejić could have received a mandate despite his low position on the list, but he did not.)

=== Parliamentarian ===
==== Yugoslavia ====
Kesejić was given the lead position on the SRS's list in Sombor for the Assembly of the Federal Republic of Yugoslavia's Chamber of Citizens in the 1996 Yugoslavian parliamentary election. He was elected when the list won a single mandate. The Socialist Party of Serbia (Socijalistička partija Srbije, SPS) won the election and governed in coalition with its Montenegrin allies; the Radicals initially served in opposition. Kesejić also ran for the Assembly of Vojvodina in the concurrent 1996 provincial election and was defeated.

The Radical Party joined Serbia's coalition government in March 1998 and Yugoslavia's coalition government in August 1999. Kesejić served for a time as Yugoslavia's deputy minister of international trade.

He again held the lead position on the Radical Party's list for Sombor in the 2000 Yugoslavian parliamentary election. The list did not win any seats in the division. He was also defeated in Sombor's third constituency seat in the concurrent Vojvodina provincial election and in the fifth constituency for Sombor's municipal assembly in the 2000 Serbian local elections.

==== Serbia ====
Slobodan Milošević was defeated as Yugoslavia's president in the 2000 elections, a watershed moment in Serbian and Yugoslavian politics. Serbia's government fell after Milošević's defeat, and a new Serbian parliamentary election was called for December 2000. Prior to the election, Serbia's electoral laws were reformed such that the entire country was counted as a single electoral division and all mandates were awarded to candidates at the discretion of the sponsoring parties or coalitions, irrespective of numerical order. Kesejić was given the twelfth position on the Radical Party's list and was given a mandate when the list won twenty-three seats. The Democratic Opposition of Serbia (Demokratska opozicija Srbije, DOS) won a landslide victory, and the Radicals served in opposition.

In June 2001, Kesejić refused to leave the assembly after being sanctioned by speaker Nataša Mičić and was taken out by security. He suffered a medical situation in the process and had to be taken to hospital.

He was given the fifty-fourth position on the Radical Party's list in the 2003 parliamentary election and was again given a mandate when the list won eighty-two seats. Although the Radicals emerged as the largest party in the assembly after the election, they fell well short of a majority and continued to serve in opposition.

==== Serbia and Montenegro ====
The Federal Republic of Yugoslavia was re-constituted as Serbia and Montenegro in 2003. By virtue of its performance in the 2003 parliamentary election, the Radical party had the right to appoint thirty delegates to the Assembly of Serbia and Montenegro. Kesejić was given a federal mandate on 12 February 2004; by virtue of holding this position, he was required to resign his seat in the republican assembly. He once again served in the federal assembly as an opposition member. The State Union of Serbia and Montenegro ceased to exist in 2006 when Montenegro declared independence.

==== Vojvodina ====
Vojvodina switched to a system of mixed proportional representation for provincial elections following the 2000 vote. Kesejić was elected to the provincial assembly for Sombor's redistributed second division in the 2004 provincial election. The Democratic Party (Demokratska stranka, DS) and its allies won the election, and Kesejić served as a member of the opposition at this level as well. He was not a candidate for re-election in 2008.

The Radical Party experienced a serious split in late 2008, with several members joining the more moderate Serbian Progressive Party (Srpska napredna stranka, SNS) under the leadership of Tomislav Nikolić and Aleksandar Vučić. Kesejić remained with the Radicals.

Serbia's electoral laws were reformed in 2011, such that mandates were awarded in numerical order to candidates on successful lists. Kesejić appeared in the fourteenth position on the SRS's electoral list in the 2012 provincial election. Weakened by the 2008 split, the party won only five mandates, and he was not returned.

=== Local politics ===
Serbia introduced the direct election of mayors in the 2004 local elections, and Kesejić ran as the Radical Party's candidate in Sombor. He was defeated by Jovan Slavković of the Democratic Party in the second round of voting. He was elected to the municipal assembly, however, and served once again as an opposition member.

In April 2007, Kesejić led to the SRS in holding a "parallel" meeting of the local assembly in the streets of Sombor, due to a conflict over the municipality's credit indebtedness. Later the same year, he advocated for a motion that would have made Russian president Vladimir Putin an honorary citizen of Sombor. The assembly did not approve the motion.

The direct election of mayors proved to be a short-lived experiment and was abandoned with the 2008 Serbian local elections. The DS narrowly defeated the SRS in Sombor in this cycle; Slavković was included on the Radical Party's list and was again given a term in the following assembly session. Following the SRS split and Serbia's electoral reforms, he received the lead position on the Radical list for Sombor in the 2012 local elections and was re-elected when the list won four out of sixty-one mandates. He did not seek re-election in 2016.

== Electoral record ==
=== Provincial (Vojvodina) ===
2004 Vojvodina assembly election Sombor II (constituency seat) - First and Second Rounds
Candidate	Party or Coalition	Votes	%	Votes	%
Stevan Kesejić	Serbian Radical Party	3,405	29.49	5,605	57.50
Danilo Sekulić	Democratic Party–Boris Tadić	1,827	15.83	4,143	42.50
Rajko Miranović	Democratic Party of Serbia	1,338	11.59		
Miodrag Sekulić	Zajedno–Miodrag Sekulić, SPO–NDS	1,221	10.58		
Novica Blagojević	Socialist Party of Serbia	1,093	9.47		
Mirko Bulović Džin	Convention for Sombor	749	6.49		
Liljana Sokolova Đokić	G17 Plus	635	5.50		
Aleksa Subotić	Strength of Serbia Movement	610	5.28		
Vladimir Mandić	New Serbia	506	4.38		
Zorka Slijepčević	For Truth and Justice, Without Deception; Relić Petar Saka: Democratic Party of Vojvodina, Party of Free Patriots, Christian Democratic Party of Serbia, Labour Party of Serbia	161	1.39		
Total valid votes		11,545	100	9,748	100
Invalid ballots		518		285	
Total votes casts		12,063	31.96	10,033	26.58

2000 Vojvodina assembly election Sombor III (constituency seat)
Candidate	Party or Coalition	Result
Branko Vučković	Democratic Opposition of Serbia	elected
Stevan Kesejić	Serbian Radical Party	
other candidates		

=== Local (Sombor) ===
2004 Municipality of Sombor local election: Mayor of Sombor
Candidate	Party	First round		Second round	
Candidate	Party	Votes	%	Votes	%
Dr. Jovan Slavković	Democratic Party			13,052	56.94
Stevan Kesejić	Serbian Radical Party			9,869	43.06
Čedomir Backović	Citizens' Group: 25,000 Euros				
Goran Bulajić	Democratic Party of Serbia				
Rajko Bulatović	information missing				
Kosta Dedić	Strength of Serbia Movement				
Zlata Đerić	New Serbia–Social Democracy–Revival of Serbia–"Svetozar Miletić" Movement (Affiliation: New Serbia)				
Vladislav Kronić	G17 Plus				
Marta Horvat Odri	Democratic Fellowship of Vojvodina Hungarians				
Dušan Popović	Socialist Party of Serbia				
Miodrag Sekulić	Independent (endorsed by Serbian Renewal Movement–People's Democratic Party)				
Total				22,921	100.00
