= Petar Relić (Serbian politician, 1939–2005) =

Serbian politician (1939–2005)

Petar Relić (Serbian Cyrillic: Петар Релић; 1939–2005), nicknamed Saka, was a politician in Serbia. He was a member of the Assembly of Vojvodina from 1993 to 2004 and served as secretary of the Sombor municipal assembly. For most of his time as an elected official, Relić was a member of the Democratic Party (Demokratska stranka, DS). Late in his life, he was implicated in a significant financial scandal in Sombor.

== Private career ==
Relić held a Bachelor of Laws degree.

== Politician ==
Relić ran for Sombor's first constituency seat in the 1990 Serbian parliamentary election as an independent candidate and was defeated by Josip Subotić of the Socialist Party of Serbia (Socijalistička partija Srbije, SPS). He was later elected to the Vojvodina assembly in the December 1992 provincial election for Sombor's sixth division with a combined endorsement from the DS, the Reform Democratic Party of Vojvodina, and the Democratic Movement of Serbia (Demokratski pokret Srbije, DEPOS). He took his seat when the assembly convened in early 1993. The SPS won a majority victory in the election, and Relić served in opposition.

If he was not already a member of the DS when he was elected to the provincial assembly, he soon joined the party and appeared in the ninth position on its electoral list for the Novi Sad division in the 1993 Serbian parliamentary election. The list won four seats, and he did not receive a mandate. (From 1992 to 2000, Serbia's electoral law stipulated that one-third of parliamentary mandates would be assigned to candidates on successful lists in numerical order, while the remaining two-thirds would be distributed amongst other candidates at the discretion of sponsoring parties or coalitions. Relić could have been given a mandate despite his relatively low position on the list, but he was not.)

The DS participated in the 1996 provincial election as part of the Zajedno coalition, and Relić was re-elected under its banner in Sombor's sixth division. The SPS again won the election, and Relić continued to serve in opposition.

For the 2000 provincial election, the DS was a leading force in a multi-party coalition called the Democratic Opposition of Serbia (Demokratska opozicija Srbije, DOS). The DOS won a landslide majority victory; Relić was again re-elected and this time served as a supporter of the administration. He also served as secretary of the Sombor municipal assembly in this time.

He later left the DS and ran in the 2004 provincial election as the leader of a local coalition of four smaller parties. He was defeated.

=== Financial scandal ===
Shortly before the end of his life, Relić was implicated in a scandal involving the disappearance of more than five million dinars from the Sombor municipal budget between 1999 and 2001. He died in 2005 before the case went to trial. A district court verdict in December 2007 found that Relić and two other municipal officials had exceeded their authority to dispose of money from three municipal budget accounts and falsified the signatures of the president and vice-president of the executive board.

The core of the scandal involved a series of dubious currency transactions. Relić said in a police interrogation statement that "the purchase of foreign currency for special purposes" had taken place more-or-less openly within the Sombor municipal government during a period of political upheaval in Serbia. At the end of the trial, it was still not known for what purpose the money had been used.

== Electoral record ==
=== Provincial (Vojvodina) ===
2004 Vojvodina provincial election: Sombor Division 1
Candidate	Party	First round		Second round	
Candidate	Party	Votes	%	Votes	%
Milan Aleksić	Democratic Party of Serbia	2,544	18.42	8,851	68.49
Nikola Pejović	Serbian Radical Party	2,052	14.86	4,072	31.51
Zlatko Miličević	Democratic Party	1,890	13.68		
Eržebet Karher	Democratic Fellowship of Vojvodina Hungarians	1,654	11.98		
Aleksandar Bošnjak	G17 Plus	1,461	10.58		
Vlado Babić	Convention for Sombor	858	6.21		
Zvonimir Štrbac	Coalition: Together for Vojvodina–Nenad Čanak	687	4.97		
Ladislav Fekete	Social Democracy	589	4.26		
Ivica Frgić	Zajedno–Miodrag Sekulić, SPO–NDS	551	3.99		
Petar Relić Saka (incumbent)	For Truth and Justice, Without Deception–Petar Relić-Saka: Democratic Party of Vojvodina–Party of Free Patriots–Christian Democratic Party of Serbia–Labour Party of Serbia	535	3.87		
Jozo Ilić	Civic Movement of Vojvodina	513	3.71		
Zdenka Osterman	Strength of Serbia Movement	477	3.45		
Total		13,811	100.00	12,923	100.00
Valid votes		13,811	95.67	12,923	96.72
Invalid/blank votes		625	4.33	438	3.28
Total votes		14,436	100.00	13,361	100.00

2000 Vojvodina provincial election: Sombor Division 6 (Second Round)
Candidate	Party	Votes	%
Petar Relić (incumbent)	Democratic Opposition of Serbia (Affiliation: Democratic Party)	4,210	72.86
Đorđe Katić	Socialist Party of Serbia–Yugoslav Left	941	16.29
Sima Kurtešanin	Serbian Radical Party	627	10.85
Total		5,778	100.00

1996 Vojvodina provincial election: Sombor Division 6
Candidate	Party
Petar Relić (ELECTED)	Coalition Together (Affiliation: Democratic Party)
other candidates	
Total

December 1992 Vojvodina provincial election: Sombor Division 6
Candidate	Party
Petar Relić (ELECTED)	Democratic Party
Snežana Gajić	Serb Democratic Party
Jovan Guljičić	Serb Peasant Party
Živojin Jurišić	Serbian Radical Party
Dragoljub Maširević	People's Radical Party
Milan Vukelić (incumbent)	Socialist Party of Serbia
Total
Source: All candidates except Relić are listed alphabetically.

=== National Assembly of Serbia ===
1990 Serbian parliamentary election: Sombor Division 1
Candidate	Party
Dr. Josip Subotić (ELECTED)	Socialist Party of Serbia
Đorđe Burgijašev	Union of Reform Forces of Yugoslavia for Vojvodina–Association for the Yugoslav Democratic Initiative– Democratic Alliance of Croats in Vojvodina
Etelka Kocsis	Democratic Fellowship of Vojvodina Hungarians
Mladen Lazić	People's Radical Party–Serbian Saint Sava Party
Dr. Saša Mešterović	Serbian Renewal Movement
Baranko Prostran	Citizens' Group
Petar Relić	Citizens' Group
Spasoje Salatić	Citizens' Group
Milan Stepanović	Democratic Party
Jovan Vujičić	Workers' Party of Yugoslavia
Total
Source: All candidates except Subotić are listed alphabetically.
