= Goran Bulajić =

Serbian politician (born 1960)

Goran Bulajić (Serbian Cyrillic: Горан Булајић; born 1960) is a politician in Serbia. He was the mayor of Sombor from 1996 to 2000, served two brief terms in the National Assembly of Serbia, and was a member of the Assembly of Serbia and Montenegro from 2004 to 2006. During his time as an elected official, Bulajić was a member of the Democratic Party of Serbia (Demokratska stranka Srbije, DSS).

== Private career ==
Bulajić holds a Bachelor of Laws degree.

== Politician ==
=== Early candidacies (1990–96) ===
Bulajić joined the Democratic Party (Demokratska stranka, DS) when multi-party democracy was re-introduced to Serbia in 1990. He ran for Sombor's second constituency seat in the 1990 Serbian parliamentary election and was defeated by Veljko Simin of the Socialist Party of Serbia (Socijalistička partija Srbije, SPS). The DS split in 1992, and Bulajić joined the breakaway Democratic Party of Serbia.

The DSS participated in the 1992 parliamentary election as part of the Democratic Movement of Serbia (Demokratski pokret Srbije, DEPOS) alliance. Prior to this election, Serbia's electoral laws were changed such that the elections took place under proportional representation, with one-third of the mandates awarded to candidates from successful lists in numerical order and the other two-thirds awarded to other candidates at the discretion of the sponsoring parties or coalitions. Bulajić appeared in the seventeenth position on the DEPOS list for the Novi Sad division. The list won five mandates, and he was not included in the alliance's assembly delegation.

The DSS later left DEPOS and participated in the 1993 parliamentary election on its own. Bulajić was given the third position on the party's list in Novi Sad; the list did not cross the electoral threshold to receive any mandates. Three years later, the party took part in the Zajedno coalition for the 1996 Yugoslavian parliamentary election, and Bulajić appeared in the lead position on the coalition's list for Sombor. Once again, the list did not cross the electoral threshold.

=== Elected official and administrator (1996–2016) ===
Bulajić was elected to the Sombor municipal assembly in the 1996 Serbian local elections, which occurred concurrently with the Yugoslavian parliamentary election. Zajedno candidates won a majority of seats, and he was chosen as assembly president, a position that was at the time equivalent to mayor. He served in this role for the next term and was an opponent of Slobodan Milošević's administration. The local government effectively ceased to function due to a political stalemate in August 2000.

For the 2000 Serbian parliamentary election, the DSS took part in a multi-party alliance called the Democratic Opposition of Serbia (Demokratska opozicija Srbije, DOS). Serbia's electoral laws were again changed prior to the election, such that the entire country became a single electoral division and all mandates were awarded at the discretion of the sponsoring parties and coalitions, irrespective of numerical order. Bulajić appeared in the 197th position on the DOS electoral list. The alliance won a landslide majority victory with 176 out of 250 seats. He was not initially given an assembly seat and was instead appointed as administrator of the West Bačka District. In May 2001, he was elected as a vice-president of the DSS.

The DSS left Serbia's coalition government in July 2001, and rumours circulated that the party would bring down the government to protest its decision to extradite Slobodan Milošević to the International Criminal Tribunal for the former Yugoslavia (ICTY). Bulajić denied this would happen, saying, "we do not plan to overthrow the Serbian government, particularly not to Milošević's extradition to the Hague tribunal. This is not the most decisive issue. The economy, standard of living, social progress and privatization are more important." The government ultimately did not fall. In March 2002, Bulajić held out hope that the DSS could once again confirm its alliance with the DOS; this did not happen, and the party formally left the coalition later in the year. Bulajić stood down as district administrator in May 2002, when a number of DSS administrators resigned their positions. He served afterward in the municipal assembly.

On 12 June 2002, the DOS controversially removed a number of DSS politicians from the national assembly. Some of the vacant mandates were awarded to DSS members from the 2000 electoral list; others were awarded to representatives of various other parties still in the DOS. Bulajić was among the DSS candidates who received a replacement mandate. The party contended that the removal of its sitting members was illegitimate, and the new DSS delegates (including Bulajić) refused to serve. The appointments were later overturned on a technicality, and the original DSS members were returned to the assembly.

Bulajić appeared in the twenty-third position on the DSS's list in the 2003 parliamentary election. The list won fifty-three mandates, and he was included in the party's delegation. By virtue of its performance in the parliamentary election, the DSS had the right to appoint twenty members to the Assembly of Serbia and Montenegro; Bulajić was chosen for the party's federal delegation on 12 February 2004 and so resigned his seat in the republican assembly.

Serbia introduced the direct election of mayors for the 2004 Serbian local elections. Bulajić ran as the DSS candidate in Sombor and was defeated in the first round. The Union of Serbia and Montenegro ceased to exist in 2006 when Montenegro declared independence; Bulajić's term in the federal parliament accordingly came to an end. He was included on the DSS's electoral list for the 2007 Serbian parliamentary election but was not given a mandate afterward.

Bulajić appeared in the third position on the DSS's list for Sombor in the 2008 local elections. The list won five mandates, and he was given a seat in the city assembly. He also appeared in the fifteenth position on the DSS list in the concurrent 2008 Vojvodina provincial election; the list won four mandates, and he did not receive a seat.

Serbia's electoral laws were again reformed in 2011, such that mandates were awarded in numerical order to candidates on successful lists. Bulajić received the fourth position on the DSS list in the 2012 local elections and was re-elected when the list won five seats. He received the same position on a combined DSS–Dveri list in the 2016 elections and was not re-elected when the list failed to cross the electoral threshold.

Bulajić was again elected as a vice-president of the DSS in 2015.

== Electoral record ==
=== Local (Sombor) ===
2004 Municipality of Sombor local election: Mayor of Sombor
Candidate	Party	First round		Second round	
Candidate	Party	Votes	%	Votes	%
Dr. Jovan Slavković	Democratic Party			13,052	56.94
Stevan Kesejić	Serbian Radical Party			9,869	43.06
Čedomir Backović	Citizens' Group: 25,000 Euros				
Goran Bulajić	Democratic Party of Serbia				
Rajko Bulatović	information missing				
Kosta Dedić	Strength of Serbia Movement				
Zlata Đerić	New Serbia–Social Democracy–Revival of Serbia–"Svetozar Miletić" Movement (Affiliation: New Serbia)				
Vladislav Kronić	G17 Plus				
Marta Horvat Odri	Democratic Fellowship of Vojvodina Hungarians				
Dušan Popović	Socialist Party of Serbia				
Miodrag Sekulić	Independent (endorsed by Serbian Renewal Movement–People's Democratic Party)				
Total				22,921	100.00

=== National Assembly of Serbia ===
1990 Serbian parliamentary election Member for Sombor II
Goran Bulajić	Democratic Party	
István Maros	Democratic Fellowship of Vojvodina Hungarians	
Mata Matarić	Democratic Alliance of Croats in Vojvodina–Union of Reform Forces of Yugoslavia in Vojvodina– League of Social Democrats of Vojvodina-Yugoslavia–Association for the Yugoslav Democratic Initiative	
Dušan Radusin	Workers' Party of Yugoslavia	
Veljko Simin	Socialist Party of Serbia	Elected
Miroslav Crkvenjakov	Serbian Renewal Movement–People's Party	
