= Petar Petrović =

Petar Petrović (Cyrillic: Петар Петровић) or Petar Petrovic may refer to:

- Petar I Petrović-Njegoš (1747–1830), ruler of Montenegro
- Petar II Petrović-Njegoš (1813-1851), ruler of Montenegro
- Petar Petrović (magnate) (1486-1557), ethnic Serb magnate in Banat, administrator of Kingdom of Hungary, governor of Temes County and ban of Lugos and Karansebes
- Petar Petrović (bishop), Serbian Bishop from 18th century in Archdiocese of Arad
- Petar Petrović (footballer, born 1995), Swedish footballer
- Petar Petrović (footballer, born 2005), Serbian footballer
- Petar Petrović (Serbian politician, born 1951), Serbian politician
- Petar Petrović (Serbian politician, born 1955), Serbian politician
- Petar Petrovic, Swedish citizen of Serbian origin murder in the 2015 Gothenburg pub shooting
