= Zlata Đerić =

Serbian politician

- Злата Ђерић

Member of the Assembly of Vojvodina
- Incumbent
- Assumed office 9 February 2024
- In office 2 June 2016 – 31 July 2020

Member of the National Assembly of the Republic of Serbia
- In office 11 June 2008 – 3 June 2016
- In office 4 December 2001 – 27 January 2004

Personal details
- Born: 23 December 1958 (age 67)
- Party: SPO (until 1997); NS (1997–2018); Team For Life (2018–22); NDSS (2022–present)

Zlata Đerić (Serbian Cyrillic: Злата Ђерић; born 23 December 1958) is a Serbian politician. She has served four terms in the National Assembly of Serbia and is now serving her second term in the Assembly of Vojvodina. A leading member of New Serbia (NS) for many years, she now serves on the presidency of the New Democratic Party of Serbia (NDSS), which was known until May 2022 as the Democratic Party of Serbia (DSS). Before entering political life, she worked as a teacher and has published several works on the Serbian language and literature.

== Private career ==
Đerić was born in Sombor, Autonomous Province of Vojvodina, in what was then the People's Republic of Serbia in the Federal People's Republic of Yugoslavia. She graduated from the University of Novi Sad Faculty of Philosophy in 1982, later earned a master's degree in literature, and has published a number of works on the Serbian language and Serbian literature, including Psihologija srpske politike - Ispravljanje krive Drine.

== Politician ==
=== Early years and first national assembly term ===
Đerić entered political life as a member of the Serbian Renewal Movement (SPO). In the 1997 Serbian parliamentary election, she appeared in the lead position on the party's electoral list for the Sombor division. She would have automatically received a mandate had the party won any seats in the division, but it did not. The SPO experienced a serious split the following year, and Đerić joined the breakaway New Serbia party under the leadership of Velimir Ilić.

Serbia's electoral system was reformed prior to the 2000 parliamentary election, such that the entire country became a single electoral district and all mandates were assigned to candidates on successful lists at the discretion of the sponsoring parties or coalitions, irrespective of numerical order. New Serbia participated in the 2000 election as part of the Democratic Opposition of Serbia (DOS), a broad and ideologically diverse coalition of parties opposed to the recently overthrown regime of Slobodan Milošević. Đerić was included on the DOS list in the 212th position out of 250. The list won a landslide victory with 176 seats; she was not initially included in her party's assembly delegation but received a mandate on 4 December 2001 as the replacement for another NS member. New Serbia provided support for Serbia's DOS government until 2002, when it broke from the alliance and moved into opposition. In her first term, Đerić was a member of the labour committee (Note: Formally known as the Committee for Labour, Veterans' Affairs, and Social Affairs) and the committee for environmental protection.

New Serbia contested the 2003 parliamentary election in an alliance with the SPO, and Đerić received the twelfth position on their combined list. The list won twenty-two seats, and she was not given a mandate. She later appeared in the second position on New Serbia's list for the 2004 Vojvodina provincial election. The list did not cross the electoral threshold for assembly representation.

Serbia introduced the direct election of mayors for the 2004 Serbian local elections, which took place concurrently with the provincial vote. Đerić ran as New Serbia's candidate for mayor of Sombor; her campaign was also endorsed by Social Democracy (SD) and two smaller political movements. She was defeated in the first round of voting. She was, however, included on New Serbia's list for the Sombor municipal assembly and was elected when the list won three seats. The direct election of mayors proved to be a short-lived experiment and was abandoned in 2008; since this time, mayors have been chosen by the elected members of the local assemblies.

New Serbia contested the 2007 parliamentary election in an alliance with the Democratic Party of Serbia, and Đerić was given the sixteenth position on their combined list. The list won forty-seven seats, and she once again did not receive a mandate.

=== Return to the national assembly ===
The DSS and New Serbia continued their alliance into the 2008 parliamentary election; Đerić received the fiftieth position on their list and was given a mandate for a second assembly term when the list won thirty seats. In the concurrent 2008 Serbian local elections, New Serbia formed an alliance in Sombor with the Socialist Party of Serbia (SPS) and other parties. Đerić received the third position on their combined list, which did not cross the threshold for assembly representation.

The results of the parliamentary election were inconclusive, and serious discussions later took place between the DSS–NS alliance, the SPS, and the Serbian Radical Party (SRS) about forming a new coalition government. This ultimately did not happen; the SPS instead entered a coalition government with the For a European Serbia (ZES) alliance, and New Serbia served in opposition. Đerić became deputy chair of the labour committee and was a member of the committee for gender equality, the working group on the rights of the child, and the parliamentary friendship groups with Israel, Italy, and the Sovereign Order of Malta.

Serbia's electoral system was reformed again in 2011, such that all mandates were awarded to candidates on successful lists in numerical order. New Serbia formed an alliance with the Serbian Progressive Party (SNS) in this period and contested the 2012 parliamentary election on the latter's Let's Get Serbia Moving list. Đerić received the fifty-seventh position and was re-elected when the list won seventy-three mandates. The SNS and SPS subsequently formed a new coalition government that included New Serbia, and Đerić served as part of its parliamentary majority. In the 2012–14 parliament, she was a member of the committee for human and minority rights and gender equality, a deputy member of the foreign affairs committee and the committee on the rights of the child, and a member of Serbia's friendship groups with Denmark, Finland, Israel, Italy, Ukraine, and the United Kingdom.

She was given the sixty-ninth position on the Progressive Party's coalition list in the 2014 parliamentary election and was elected to a fourth term when the list won a landslide majority victory with 158 mandates. She served afterward as a member of the committee on foreign affairs, the committee for human and minority rights and gender equality, and the committee on Kosovo and Metohija, and was a deputy member of the committee on the rights of the child. She was also part of Serbia's delegation to the parliamentary dimension of the Central European Initiative, chaired Serbia's friendship groups with Chile and Ethiopia, and was a member of the friendship groups with Israel, Italy, Norway, and Russia. In September 2014, she was chosen to lead a working group on human rights and freedoms and the rights of the child.

=== First term in the Vojvodina assembly ===
Đerić did not seek re-election to the national assembly in 2016. She instead appeared in the tenth position on the SNS's coalition list in the 2016 Vojvodina provincial election and was elected to the provincial assembly when the list won sixty-three out of 120 mandates. She also led a list called "Truth – New Serbia" in Sombor in the concurrent 2016 local elections; the list did not cross the electoral threshold.

In early 2017, Velimir Ilić withdrew New Serbia's support for Serbia's SNS-led government at the republic level. This led to a party split, with several prominent NS members leaving the party in order to continue supporting the Progressive alliance. Đerić initially remained with New Serbia; she left the SNS's group in the provincial assembly and joined the opposition "Alternative for Vojvodina" group. She ultimately left New Serbia as well, however, and in 2018 she created her own political movement called "Team for Life" (Tim za Život). The group's primary focus was protecting what it considered the "demographic survival of Serbia" by increasing the country's birth rate.

=== "Team for Life" ===
Đerić led "Team for Life" into the DSS-led METLA 2020 alliance in 2019 and served on the alliance's presidency. She received the fifth position on the alliance's list in the 2020 parliamentary election; the list did not cross the electoral threshold to win assembly representation. She led "Team for Life" into the National Democratic Alternative (NADA) alliance, which also included the DSS, in 2021.

=== New Democratic Party of Serbia ===
Đerić subsequently became a member of the New Democratic Party of Serbia, and in July 2022 she was elected to its presidency.

She received the fifteenth position on the NADA alliance's list in the 2023 Serbian parliamentary election and was not elected when the list won thirteen seats. She is currently the first candidate in sequence with the right to enter the assembly as the replacement for another NDSS delegate, should a vacancy occur.

Đerić was also given the fifth position on NADA's list for the Vojvodina provincial assembly in the concurrent 2023 provincial election and was elected to a second term in that body when the list won seven seats. The SNS and its allies won a majority victory, and she now serves in opposition. She is a member of the health committee (Note: Formally known as the Committee on Health, Social Policy, Labour, Demographic Policy, and Social Child Care) and the committee on cooperation with the national assembly committees in exercise of competences of the province.

== Electoral record ==
=== Local (Sombor) ===
2004 Municipality of Sombor local election: Mayor of Sombor
Candidate	Party	First round		Second round	
Candidate	Party	Votes	%	Votes	%
Dr. Jovan Slavković	Democratic Party			13,052	56.94
Stevan Kesejić	Serbian Radical Party			9,869	43.06
Čedomir Backović	Citizens' Group: 25,000 Euros				
Goran Bulajić	Democratic Party of Serbia				
Rajko Bulatović	information missing				
Kosta Dedić	Strength of Serbia Movement				
Zlata Đerić	New Serbia–Social Democracy–Revival of Serbia–"Svetozar Miletić" Movement (Affiliation: New Serbia)				
Vladislav Kronić	G17 Plus				
Marta Horvat Odri	Democratic Fellowship of Vojvodina Hungarians				
Dušan Popović	Socialist Party of Serbia				
Miodrag Sekulić	Independent (endorsed by Serbian Renewal Movement–People's Democratic Party)				
Total				22,921	100.00
