= Lusici =

Lusici may refer to:

- Lusici (tribe), which settled in Lusatia (now in Germany/Poland)
- Lusići, a village in Bosnia-Herzegovina
