= Robert Kolar =

Serbian politician (born 1966)

Robert Kolar (Serbian Cyrillic: Роберт Колар; born 18 September 1966) is a politician in Serbia. A longtime member of the League of Social Democrats of Vojvodina (LSV), he has served in the Assembly of Vojvodina since 2012.

== Private life ==
Kolar is a dramatist from Novi Sad, Vojvodina.

== LSV spokesperson ==
Kolar was a spokesperson for the LSV in 2000 and was a prominent voice in opposition to the government of Slobodan Milošević and his allies. In January 2000, he expressed regret that the European Union had failed to lift sanctions against Serbia. In May of the same year, he criticized members of Serbia's opposition movement for not demonstrating during an official visit by Milošević to Novi Sad.

Kolar spoke against the Milošević government's "anti-terrorism" legislation in June 2000, describing it as "proof of the panic which has gripped the regime" and an attempt to "undermine the opposition authorities in the free towns of Serbia and Vojvodina, such as Novi Sad." Just before the 2000 Yugoslavian general election, he accused the regime of arresting and detaining opposition politician Živan Milutinović without any apparent cause.

After the fall of the Milošević government in the 2000 Yugoslavian election, the Democratic Opposition of Serbia (DOS), a broad coalition that included the LSV, won landslide victories in new elections held in Serbia and Vojvodina. In March 2001, however, Kolar said that the LSV would "reconsider" its participation in the DOS if the coalition did not support his party's platform for increasing the autonomy of Vojvodina.

Kolar stood down as a party spokesperson in 2001. During this time, he served on Novi Sad's city council (i.e., the executive branch of the municipal government) with responsibility for culture. He later served as president of the LSV's executive committee in Novi Sad, and he was elected to the party presidency in October 2018.

== Assembly member ==
Kolar received the eighth position on the LSV's electoral list in the 2012 Vojvodina provincial election and was elected when the list won eight mandates. The LSV participated in a coalition government in the province after the election, and Kolar served as a supporter of the ministry.

He received the eleventh position on the LSV's list for the 2016 Vojvodina provincial election and was not immediately re-elected when the list won nine mandates. He was, however, awarded a new mandate after both party leader Nenad Čanak and Marinika Tepić declined their provincial mandates in order to serve in the National Assembly of Serbia. The Serbian Progressive Party and its allies won a majority victory in this election, and the LSV moved into opposition. Kolar serves as a member of the assembly's economy committee.

Kolar was a candidate for the National Assembly of Serbia in the 2016 Serbian parliamentary election, which was held concurrently with the provincial election. He received too low a list position for election to be a realistic possibility.
