= Petar Relić =

Petar Relić may refer to:

- Petar Relić (Yugoslav partisan)
- Petar Relić (Serbian politician, 1939–2005)
