= Vladislav Kronić =

Serbian politician (born 1950)

Vladislav Kronić (Serbian Cyrillic: Владислав Кронић; born 3 July 1950) is a politician and administrator in Serbia. He served in the National Assembly of Serbia from 2004 to 2007 as a member of G17 Plus.

== Private career ==
Kronić is a graduated agricultural engineer from Sombor in the province of Vojvodina.

== Politician ==
Kronić received the ninety-fourth position on G17 Plus's electoral list in the 2003 Serbian parliamentary election. The list won thirty-four mandates, and he was included in the party's delegation when the assembly convened in January 2004. (From 2000 to 2011, mandates in Serbian parliamentary elections were awarded to successful parties or coalitions rather than to individual candidates, and it was common practice for the mandates to be assigned out of numerical order. Kronić's relatively low position on the list – which was in any event mostly alphabetical – had no specific bearing on his chances of election.) Following the election, G17 Plus participated in a coalition government with the Democratic Party of Serbia (Demokratska stranka Srbije, DSS) and the Serbian Renewal Movement (Srpski pokret obnove, SPO), and Kronić served as a supporter of the administration. He was a member of the committee on interethnic relations, the committee on agriculture, and the committee on gender equality.

Serbia introduced the direct election of mayors in the 2004 Serbian local elections. Kronić ran for mayor of Sombor and was defeated in the first round of voting. He later appeared in the one hundredth position on the G17 Plus list in the 2007 parliamentary election. The list won nineteen seats, and he was not given a mandate for a second term.

Kronić received the ninth position on a coalition list including G17 Plus in the 2008 election for the Sombor city assembly. The list won three mandates, and he was not given a seat. He was, however, later appointed as the head of the city's department of economy and continued in the role until 2014. In 2012, he left G17 Plus to join the Democratic Party (Demokratska stranka, DS).

== Electoral record ==
=== Local (Sombor) ===
2004 Municipality of Sombor local election: Mayor of Sombor
Candidate	Party	First round		Second round	
Candidate	Party	Votes	%	Votes	%
Dr. Jovan Slavković	Democratic Party			13,052	56.94
Stevan Kesejić	Serbian Radical Party			9,869	43.06
Čedomir Backović	Citizens' Group: 25,000 Euros				
Goran Bulajić	Democratic Party of Serbia				
Rajko Bulatović	information missing				
Kosta Dedić	Strength of Serbia Movement				
Zlata Đerić	New Serbia–Social Democracy–Revival of Serbia–"Svetozar Miletić" Movement (Affiliation: New Serbia)				
Vladislav Kronić	G17 Plus				
Marta Horvat Odri	Democratic Fellowship of Vojvodina Hungarians				
Dušan Popović	Socialist Party of Serbia				
Miodrag Sekulić	Independent (endorsed by Serbian Renewal Movement–People's Democratic Party)				
Total				22,921	100.00
