= Bojan Kostreš =

Serbian politician (born 1974)

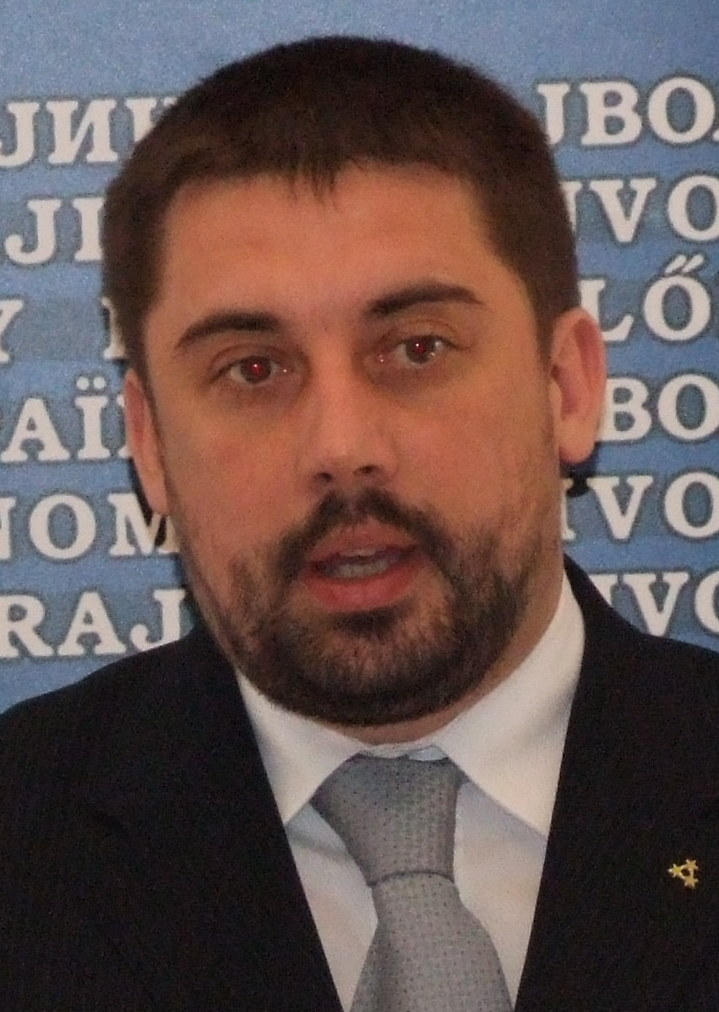

President of the Assembly of Vojvodina
- In office 30 October 2004 – 16 July 2008
- Preceded by: Nenad Čanak
- Succeeded by: Sándor Egeresi

Personal details
- Born: 25 August 1974 (age 50); Zrenjanin, SFR Yugoslavia
- Political party: League of Social Democrats of Vojvodina

Bojan Kostreš (Serbian Cyrillic: Бојан Костреш; born 25 August 1974) is a Serbian politician who is the current president and former vice-president of the League of Social Democrats of Vojvodina. He held office as the president of the Assembly of Vojvodina between October 2004 and July 2008.
