= Lusići =

Lusići Лусићи (Serbian)
- Village (Selo)
- Location within Bosnia and Herzegovina
- Coordinates: 44°35′28″N 17°01′29″E
- Country: Bosnia and Herzegovina
- Entity: Republika Srpska
- Municipality: Banja Luka

Population (2013)
  - Total: 116
- Time zone: UTC+1 (CET)
  - Summer (DST): UTC+2 (CEST)

Lusići (Serbian Cyrillic: Лусићи) is a village in the municipality of Banja Luka, Republika Srpska, Bosnia and Herzegovina.
