= Clean Hands of Vojvodina =

Political coalition in Serbia

Clean Hands of Vojvodina (Serbian: Чисте руке Војводине, romanized: Čiste ruke Vojvodine) was a political coalition in the Serbian province of Vojvodina. At the last legislative elections in Vojvodina, on September 19, 2004, the alliance won 2.29% of the popular vote, and no seats in the provincial parliament. The alliance was formed by the Reformists of Vojvodina, Serbian Renewal Movement, and Otpor. The leader of the political alliance was Miodrag Isakov.
