= Union of Reform Forces of Yugoslavia =

Former liberal political party in Yugoslavia

Union of Reform Forces of Yugoslavia Savez reformskih snaga Jugoslavije Савез реформских снага Југославије
- Abbreviation: SRSJ
- Leader: Ante Marković
- Founded: July 1990
- Dissolved: 1991
- Split from: League of Communists of Yugoslavia
- Succeeded by: Civic Alliance of Serbia; Social Democratic Party of Bosnia and Herzegovina; Social Democratic Party of Montenegro; Liberal Alliance of Montenegro; Reformists of Vojvodina; Liberal Party of Macedonia; Alliance of Independent Social Democrats; Party of Democratic Progress
- Ideology: Liberalism; Neoliberalism; Yugoslavism; Anti-nationalism
- Colors: Pink; Grey

The Union of Reform Forces of Yugoslavia (Serbo-Croatian: Савез реформских снага Југославије, Savez reformskih snaga Jugoslavije; abbr. СРСЈ or SRSJ) was a liberal political party in the SFR Yugoslavia led by Ante Marković that opposed the dissolution of Yugoslavia.

== History ==
The party was short-lived and fairly unsuccessful, but it later served as a basis for liberal parties in Serbia (the Reform Party of Serbia, later Civic Alliance of Serbia and Reformists of Vojvodina) and in North Macedonia (the Reformist Forces of Macedonia-Liberal Party, later the Liberal Party of Macedonia).

In Montenegro, it was the main opposition to the ruling Democratic Party of Socialists, as a coalition formed from the Liberal Alliance of Montenegro, Socialist Party of Montenegro, Social Democratic Party of Reformists, Independent Organization of Communists of Bar and Party of National Equality. It won 17 seats.

In the Federation of Bosnia and Herzegovina, it was a basis for the Social Democrats, led by Selim Bešlagić, which merged into Social Democratic Party of Bosnia and Herzegovina. In Republika Srpska it was a basis for the Party of Independent Social Democrats (later Alliance of Independent Social Democrats).

In Slovenia, it was organized under the name Social Democratic Union (Socialdemokratska unija, SDU), but it failed to gain any significant weight in the political spectrum, remaining a small extra-parliamentary party.

== Parliamentary elections ==
=== Montenegro ===
Parliament of Montenegro
Year	no.	Popular vote	% of popular vote	Overall seats won	Government
1990	#2	42,840	14.05%	17 / 125	opposition

=== Macedonia ===
Parliament of Macedonia
Year	no.	Popular vote	% of popular vote	Overall seats won	Government
1990	#4	128,449	16.1%	11 / 120	opposition

=== Bosnia and Herzegovina ===
Chamber of Citizens
Year	no.	Popular vote	% of popular vote	Overall seats won	Government
1990	#5	201,018	8.9%	12 / 130	opposition

Chamber of Municipalities
Year	no.	Popular vote	% of popular vote	Overall seats won	Government
1990	#5	281,436	11%	1 / 110	opposition

=== Serbia ===
Parliament of Serbia
Year	no.	Popular vote	% of popular vote	Overall seats won	Government
1990	#6	71,865	1.43%	2 / 250	opposition
