= League of Social Democrats of Vojvodina =

Political party in Serbia

League of Social Democrats of Vojvodina Лига социјалдемократа Војводине
- Abbreviation: LSV
- President: Bojan Kostreš
- Vice-Presidents: Branislav Bogaroški; Dejan Čapo; Robert Kolar
- Founder: Nenad Čanak
- Founded: 14 July 1990; 36 years ago
- Preceded by: SKV–VKL
- Headquarters: Novi Sad
- Ideology: Social democracy; Vojvodina autonomism; Pro-Europeanism
- Political position: Centre-left
- European affiliation: European Free Alliance
- Colours: Blue; Yellow; Green
- National Assembly: 0 / 250
- Assembly of Vojvodina: 0 / 120

Party flag

Website
- lsv.rs

The League of Social Democrats of Vojvodina (Serbian: Лига социјалдемократа Војводине, romanised: Liga socijaldemokrata Vojvodine, abbr. LSV) is an autonomist political party in Serbia. Its current leader is Bojan Kostreš, who succeeded Nenad Čanak. They're colloquially known as ligaši (Leaguemen).

== History ==
The party was founded by Nenad Čanak on 14 July 1990 in Novi Sad. At the First Party Congress, the LSV adopted the party program, which defined following principles of the party: liberty, equality, justice, and solidarity. At the Second Congress, which was held in July 1997, the LSV adopted a new statute.

In the first years of its existence, the party's activities were mainly directed towards organisation of anti-war actions. Together with other parties, it organised anti-war demonstrations in Vojvodina and publicly opposed mobilisation of Vojvodina citizens for the front lines in Croatia and Bosnia and Herzegovina.

== Ideology ==
LSV is positioned on the centre-left on the political spectrum. It is mainly orientated towards autonomism, although the party is also social-democratic, and regionalist. It represents itself as a multi-ethnic party, and it previously advocated for the creation of Republic of Vojvodina. It is also supportive of feminism and anti-fascism. It is supportive of accession of Serbia to the European Union.

In the Parliamentary Assembly of the Council of Europe, LSV was associated with the Socialist Group.

=== Goals ===
The League advocates the "right of autonomous decisions about fundamental affairs of Vojvodina within Serbia", which, according to the League, was abolished after the so-called Yogurt Revolution in 1988 and after constitutional changes from 1990, which, according to the League, diminished the autonomy of Vojvodina to "protocolar minimum".

In December 1998, the League proclaimed that its political goal is establishment of the Republic of Vojvodina within a federalised Serbia. In recent years, the League mostly abandoned the idea of a Republic of Vojvodina, but it still advocated a greater level of autonomy for the province. In November 2011, League official Aleksandra Jerkov stated that "Vojvodina needs more jurisdictions", but that "there is no need for it to be a republic".

== Presidents ==
No.	President	Birth–Death	Term start	Term end
1	Nenad Čanak	1959–	14 July 1990	19 November 2022
2	Bojan Kostreš	1974–	19 November 2022	Incumbent

== Electoral performance ==
=== Parliamentary elections ===
In the 1990 Serbian general election, the League supported candidates of the Union of Reform Forces of Yugoslavia and the Association for Yugoslav Democratic Initiative in several electoral districts.

National Assembly of Serbia
Year	Leader	Popular vote	% of popular vote	# of seats	Seat change	Coalition	Status
1992	Nenad Čanak	36,780	0.78%	0 / 250	Steady	With RS-RK-NSS	no seats
1993	Nenad Čanak	41,097	0.96%	0 / 250	Steady	With RDSV-SJ	no seats
1997	Nenad Čanak	112,589	2.72%	3 / 250	▲3	KV	opposition
2000	Nenad Čanak	2,402,387	64.09%	6 / 250	▲3	DOS	government
2003	Nenad Čanak	161,765	4.23%	0 / 250	▼6	ZZT	no seats
2007	Nenad Čanak	214,262	5.31%	4 / 250	▲4	With LDP-GSS-SDU-DHSS	opposition
2008	Nenad Čanak	1,590,200	38.42%	5 / 250	▲1	ZES	support
2012	Nenad Čanak	863,294	22.07%	3 / 250	▼2	IZBŽ	opposition
2014	Nenad Čanak	204,767	5.70%	6 / 250	▲3	With NDS-Z-ZZS	opposition
2016	Nenad Čanak	189,564	5.02%	4 / 250	▼2	With SDS-LDP	opposition
2020	Nenad Čanak	30,591	0.95%	0 / 250	▼4	UDS	no seats
2022	Nenad Čanak	did not participate		0 / 250	—	—	no seats

=== Provincial elections ===
In the 2004 provincial election, the LSV was part of the Together for Vojvodina coalition. The coalition won 9.44% of the popular vote in the first-round of voting. The party subsequently participated in post-election provincial government.

In the 2008 provincial election, the LSV was again part of the Together for Vojvodina coalition. The coalition won 8.25% of the popular vote in the first-round of voting, representing a drop of −1.19% from the previous election. The party subsequently participated in post-election provincial government.

=== Presidential elections ===
President of Serbia
Election year	#	Candidate	1st round votes	%	2nd round votes	%	Notes
1997	4th	Mile Isakov	111,166	2.43	—	—	Vojvodina Coalition; Election declared invalid due to low turnout
2002	▲2nd	Miroljub Labus	995,200	27.96	1,516,693	31.62	DOS; Election declared invalid due to low turnout
2003	2nd	Dragoljub Mićunović	893,906	35.42	—	—	DOS; Election declared invalid due to low turnout
2008	▲1st	Boris Tadić	1,457,030	35.39	2,304,467	50.31	For a European Serbia
2012	▼2nd	Boris Tadić	989,454	25.31	1,481,952	47.31	Choice for a Better Life
2017	▼9th	Nenad Čanak	41,070	1.12	—	—	
2022	did not participate		—	—	—	—	

== Positions held ==
Major positions held by League of Social Democrats of Vojvodina members:

President of the Assembly of Vojvodina	Years
Nenad Čanak	2000–2004
Bojan Kostreš	2004–2008

== Gallery ==
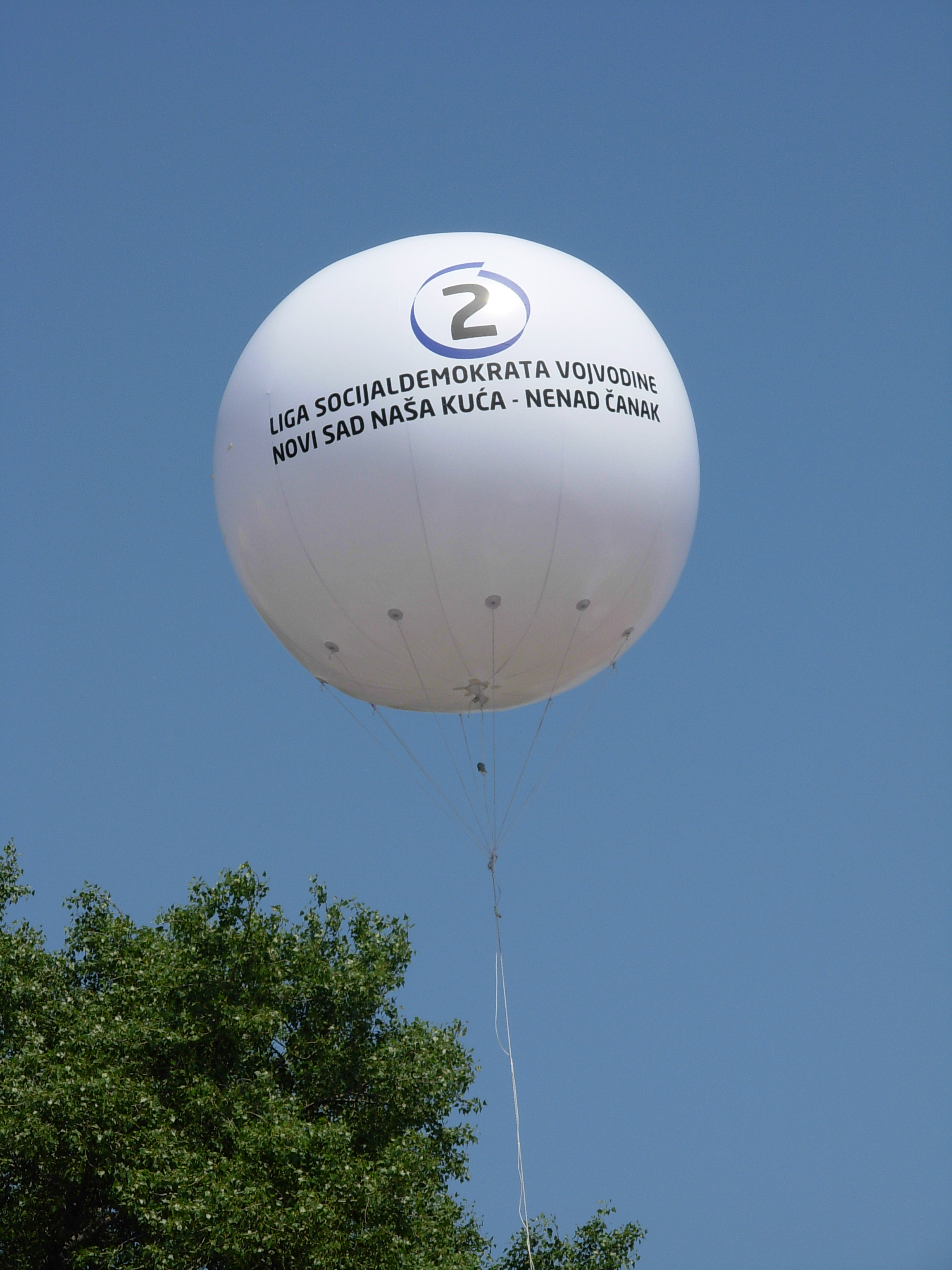
LSV balloon in 2012 elections campaign

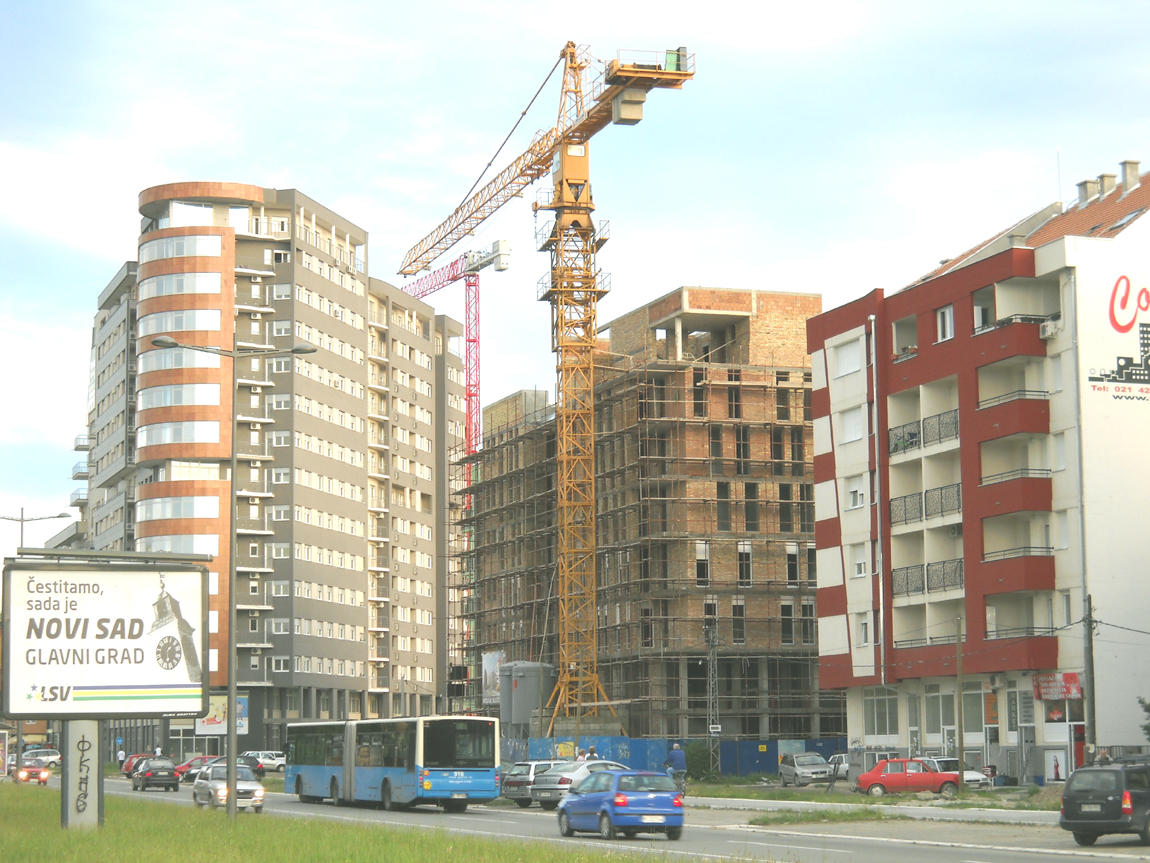
LSV billboard in Novi Sad
