= Mile Isakov =

Serbian politician

Miodrag Isakov Миодраг Исаков

Serbian Ambassador to Israel
- In office March 2006 – February 2009
- Preceded by: Dragan Maršićanin

Deputy Prime Minister of Serbia
- In office 13 June 2002 – 3 March 2004
- Prime Minister: Zoran Đinđić; Zoran Živković

Personal details
- Born: March 20, 1950 (age 76) Zemun, Yugoslavia
- Party: Reformists of Vojvodina

Miodrag "Mile" Isakov (Serbian: Миодраг "Миле" Исаков; born 20 March 1950) is a Serbian former politician, journalist, and diplomat. He is most notable as a long-time leader of the Reformists of Vojvodina (RV) political party. Until February 2009, he was the Serbian Ambassador to Israel.

== Early life ==
Born in the suburb of the capital Belgrade, Isakov attended primary school in the villages of Tovariševo and Silbaš near Bačka Palanka. He then completed secondary education (gymnasium) in Novi Sad and also attended high school in Carsonville, a village in the US state of Michigan. In 1974, he graduated from the University of Novi Sad's Faculty of Philosophy with a degree in Yugoslav literature.

In 1975 he got a job at TV Novi Sad, a state-run broadcaster where he stayed until 1994. During the late 1980s he wrote the screenplay of the comedy series Specijalna redakcija starring Đorđe Balašević, Bogdan Diklić, Aleksandar Berček, Emir Hadžihafizbegović, and Mira Banjac among others.

== Politics ==
His party was part of the wide DOS coalition that won power in FR Yugoslavia (federal level) and Serbia (republic level) in 2000. In the subsequent division of power, Isakov became one of five deputy prime ministers in the government of prime minister Zoran Đinđić. Disillusioned with the way things were going, Isakov resigned his post in 2004, and eventually left politics altogether.

In 2005 his book ParaDOS was published, chronicling his time in high politics. The same year he was the mayoral candidate at the Novi Sad municipal elections. He eventually lost to Maja Gojković.

== Personal ==
He was married to Doda Toth. They have a daughter named Iva.
