= Reformists of Vojvodina =

Serbian political party in Vojvodina

Reformists of Vojvodina Реформисти Војводине Reformisti Vojvodine
- Leader: Nedeljko Šljivanac
- Founded: 13 October 1990
- Headquarters: Novi Sad
- Ideology: Social democracy Vojvodina autonomism
- Political position: Centre-left

Website
- www.reformisti.org.rs

Reformists of Vojvodina (Serbian: Реформисти Војводине, romanized: Reformisti Vojvodine) is a social-democratic and regionalist political party in Serbia, mostly active in the autonomous province of Vojvodina.

== History ==
It was founded in October 13, 1990 as the Union of Reform Forces of Yugoslavia for Vojvodina (Savez reformskih snaga Jugoslavije za Vojvodinu) within the unified Yugoslav political movement from that time, whose founder was federal Yugoslav prime minister, Ante Marković. It won two seats in the 1990 Serbian general election.

Since 1992, party was known as the Reformist Democratic Party of Vojvodina (Reformska demokratska stranka Vojvodine), and since 2000 as the Reformists of Vojvodina (Reformisti Vojvodine).

The party could not keep up with the more popular League of Social Democrats of Vojvodina (LSV). Internal opposition against party leader Mile Isakov rose and from 2002 and after their unsuccessful 2003 campaign the Vojvodina Union – Vojvodina My Home (Vojvođanska unija – Vojvodina moj dom) under Đorđe Radosavljević and the Democratic Vojvodina (Demokratska Vojvodina) under Jelica Rajačić Čapaković broke away. The former eventually joined the Vojvodina's Party. Isakov was eventually succeeded by Nedeljko Šljivanac. The party lost most of its relevance over the years and former party members accuse the rump party under Šljivanac of having nothing to do with the original party.

== Political goals ==
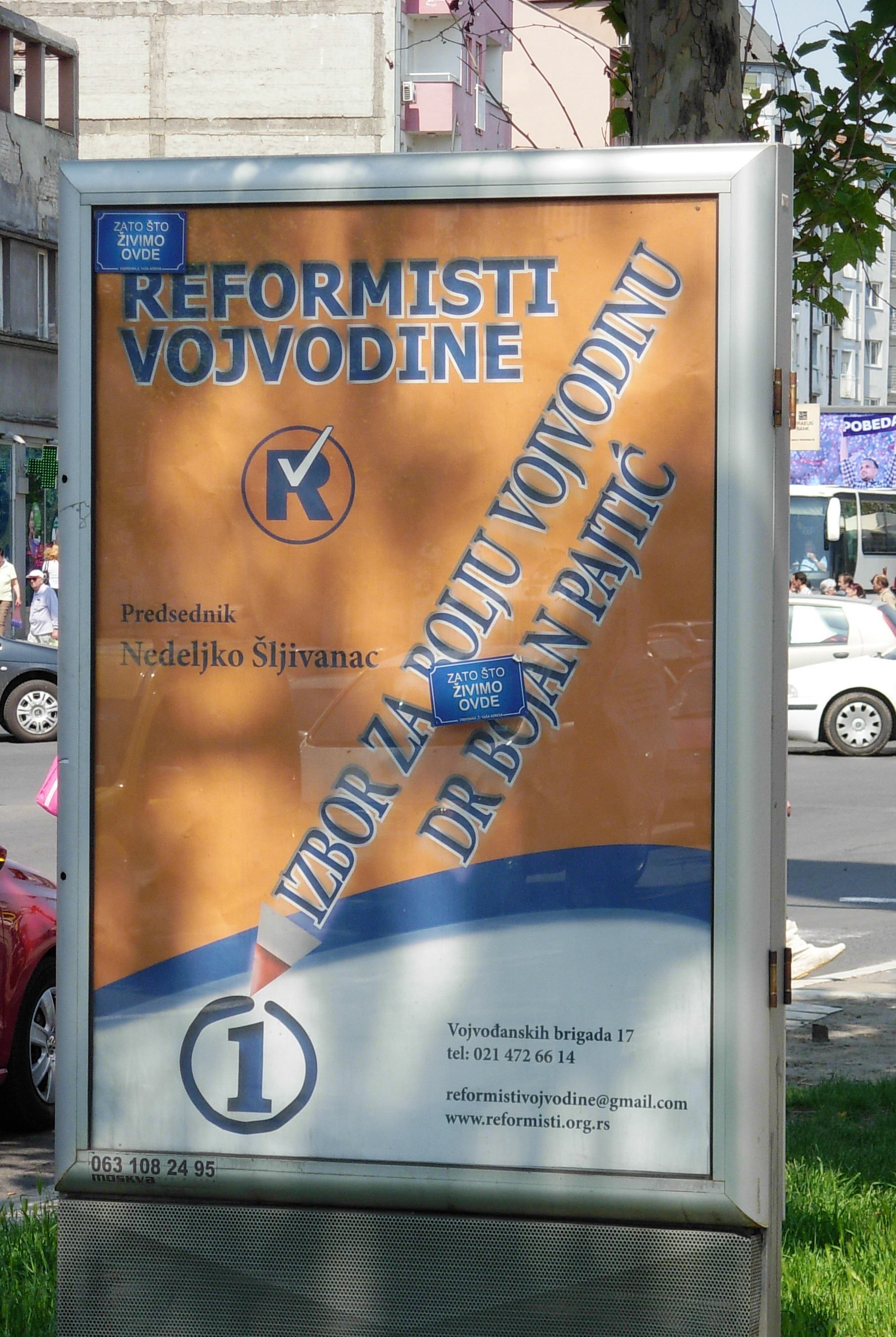
Reformists of Vojvodina - 2012 elections campaign

Party has social-democratic orientation and claims that state should be decentralized, with autonomous provinces and regions that would have different levels of autonomy, as well as with the local administration.

Party also claims that Vojvodina should have full autonomy, with legislative, judiciary, and executive jurisdictions in all areas, except in those which would be reserved for the state (defense, monetary policy, foreign policy, customs, and state security).

Party cooperated with other regionalist and social-democratic parties and was member of the Vojvodina Coalition, the Coalition Together in 1996, the Democratic Opposition of Serbia and eventually Clean Hands of Vojvodina in 2004. It since then moved towards the Serbian Progressive Party of president Aleksandar Vučić. They endorsed SNS and Vučić in the 2016 general, 2017 presidential and 2023 general elections.

== Election results ==
At the legislative elections in Vojvodina, on September 19, 2004, the party won 2 seats in the provincial parliament.

== Party leadership ==
- Dragoslav Petrović (1990-1996)
- Ratko Filipović (1996-1998)
- Miodrag Isakov (1998-2007)
- Nedeljko Šljivanac, current leader.

== Sources ==
- Popov, Dušan (2004). Enciklopedija Novog Sada. ISBN 86-84097-23-8.
