= 2004 Vojvodina provincial election =

Local elections in Serbia

The first round of the Vojvodina provincial elections was held on September 19, 2004, at the same time when the local elections were held in the whole of Serbia (with the exception of the Autonomous Province of Kosovo).

Second round of elections was held on October 3, 2004.

== Rules ==
There are 120 MPs in Vojvodina's Parliament. One half (60 MPs) is elected based on a proportional representation one-round system, according to which Vojvodina is one electoral unit. Voters choose between several Parties, Coalitions or Citizen Groups. The other 60 MPs are elected based on majority two-round system, according to which Vojvodina is divided into 60 electoral units in a way that every county gives at least one MP. Some larger electoral units, like the cities of Novi Sad, Subotica, Zrenjanin etc., give more (from 2 up to 7). In this case, voters choose between more candidates. A candidate can win in first round if he/she gets more than 50%+1 votes of those who voted. If none gets enough votes, the two strongest candidates go to the second round, in which the one with more votes wins.

The election threshold for Parties, Coalitions and Citizen's Groups is 5%, except for Parties of minority groups (Hungarians, Croats, etc.), for whom the threshold is smaller, but not smaller than the number of votes necessary to get one MP. According to the law, on all lists of Parties, Coalitions and Citizen's Groups at least 30% of the proposed MPs must be women.

== Participants ==
=== Lists that competed in one-round system ===
1. Democratic Party (Demokratska stranka) – Boris Tadić
2. Alliance of Vojvodina Hungarians (Savez vojvođanskih Mađara - Vajdasági Magyar Szövetség) – Kasza József
3. Serbian Radical Party (Srpska radikalna stranka) – Tomislav Nikolić
4. "Together for Vojvodina" ("Zajedno za Vojvodinu") – Nenad Čanak
  - League of Vojvodina Social Democrats (Liga socijaldemokrata Vojvodine)
  - Democratic Vojvodina (Demokratska Vojvodina)
  - Vojvodina Union - Vojvodina my home (Vojvođanska unija – Vojvodina moj dom)
  - Union of Socialists of Vojvodina (Unija socijalista Vojvodine)
  - Vojvodinian Movement (Vojvođanski pokret)
  - Civic Alliance of Serbia (Građanski savez Srbije)
  - Social Democratic Union (Socijaldemokratska unija)
5. G17 Plus (G17+) – Miroljub Labus
6. Socialist Party of Serbia (Socijalistička partija Srbije) – Dušan Bajatović
7. Democratic Party of Serbia (Demokratska stranka Srbije) – Vojislav Koštunica
8. "Clean hands of Vojvodina" ("Čiste ruke Vojvodine") – Miodrag Isakov
  - Reformists of Vojvodina (Reformisti Vojvodine)
  - Serbian Renewal Movement (Srpski pokret obnove)
  - Resistance (Otpor)
9. Strength of Serbia Movement (Politički pokret „Snaga Srbije”) – Bogoljub Karić
10. New Serbia (Nova Srbija) – Velimir Ilić

== Results ==
Party	List			Constituency			Total seats
Party	Votes	%	Seats	Votes	%	Seats	Total seats
Serbian Radical Party	187,666	30.38	21			15	36
Democratic Party	137,797	22.31	15			19	34
Together for Vojvodina	60,389	9.78	6			1	7
Alliance of Vojvodina Hungarians	54,380	8.80	6			5	11
Democratic Party of Serbia	43,077	6.97	4			3	7
Strength of Serbia Movement	42,813	6.93	4			3	7
Socialist Party of Serbia	37,111	6.01	4			4	8
G17 Plus	30,985	5.02	0			2	2
Clean Hands of Vojvodina	14,666	2.37	0			0	0
New Serbia	8,783	1.42	0			0	0
Democratic Party of Vojvodina Hungarians						1	1
Reformists of Vojvodina						2	2
Subotica Our City						1	1
Citizen Groups						4	4
Total	617,667	100.00	60			60	120
Valid votes	617,667	96.61					
Invalid/blank votes	21,654	3.39					
Total votes	639,321	100.00		637,259	–		
Registered voters/turnout	1,659,152	38.53		1,659,152	38.41		
Source: PIK

== Aftermath ==
A governing coalition was formed comprising the Democratic Party, Together for Vojvodina, Alliance of Vojvodina Hungarians, and Strength of Serbia Movement, which together hold 66 seats in the Assembly - a majority of 12.

Democratic Party Vice-President Bojan Pajtić was elected President of the Executive Council and Bojan Kostreš from the League of Vojvodina Social Democrats was elected President of the Assembly.

== See also ==
- Parliament of Vojvodina
- Vojvodina
- Politics of Vojvodina
