= Nenad Čanak =

Serbian politician (born 1959)

- Ненад Чанак
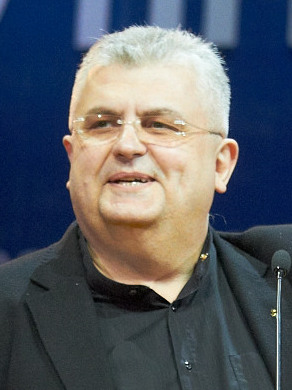
- Čanak in 2012

President of the Assembly of Vojvodina
- In office 23 October 2000 – 30 October 2004
- Preceded by: Živorad Smiljanić
- Succeeded by: Bojan Kostreš

Personal details
- Born: 2 November 1959 (age 66) Pančevo, PR Serbia, Yugoslavia
- Party: League of Social Democrats of Vojvodina (1990–); League of Communists of Yugoslavia (1977–1990)
- Spouse: Marija Vasić (div. 2001)
- Children: 1

Military service
- Allegiance: SFR Yugoslavia
- Branch/service: Yugoslav People's Army
- Years of service: 1991
- Battles/wars: Croatian War of Independence: Battle of Vukovar

Nenad Čanak (Serbian Cyrillic: Ненад Чанак, pronounced [nênaːd tʃǎnak]; born 2 November 1959) is a Serbian politician. He is the co-founder and former leader of the centre-left League of Social Democrats of Vojvodina. He was the President of the Assembly of Vojvodina from 2000 to 2004, and until 2020 he was a member of the National Assembly of Serbia.

== Early life ==
Čanak was born in Pančevo, in the autonomous province of Vojvodina, PR Serbia, FPR Yugoslavia (now Serbia). His paternal ancestors were colonists from Zrmanja, Gračac in Lika (in modern Croatia).

He was raised in a family of teachers, and went to the general and musical high school (flute) in Novi Sad, graduated from the University of Novi Sad Faculty of Economics at Subotica and after that specialized in marketing and computer networks at the Executive Training Center in Brdo pri Kranju in 1989.

== Political career ==
Čanak is the co-founder and leader of the League of Social Democrats of Vojvodina (LSV, est. 1990). In October 1991, he was forcibly mobilized during the War in Croatia and sent to the front in Ilok. At the start of the NATO bombing of Yugoslavia, he requested to be mobilized but was turned down.

He was also the President of the Assembly of the Autonomous Province of Vojvodina from 2000 to 2004.

From 2004 until 2020 he was a member of the National Assembly. In Spring 2009 he took part in regional edition of Big Brother reality show, Veliki Brat VIP All Stars.

In September 2022, Čanak announced that he would step down as president of LSV at the party conference in November 2022.

== Policies ==
The LSV actively seeks the decentralization of Serbia with a higher autonomy for Vojvodina. He was once quoted as saying: "We want a Vojvodina in which there will be order, civility and prosperity".

== Personal life ==
Nenad Čanak was married to Marija Vasić until their divorce in 2001. They have a son together, born in 1999.
