= Together for Vojvodina (coalition) =

Political coalition in Serbia

Together for Vojvodina (Serbian: Заједно за Војводину, Zajedno za Vojvodinu) was a political coalition in the Serbian province of Vojvodina. At the latest legislative elections in Vojvodina, in September 2004, the alliance won 9.44% of the popular vote, and 7 seats in the provincial parliament. The alliance is formed by the several mostly regionalist political parties including League of Vojvodina Social Democrats, Union of Socialists of Vojvodina, Vojvodinian Movement, Social Democratic Union and Democratic Union of Croats (elections 2008) .
