= Milorad Mirčić =

Serbian politician (1956–2025)

- Милорад Мирчић
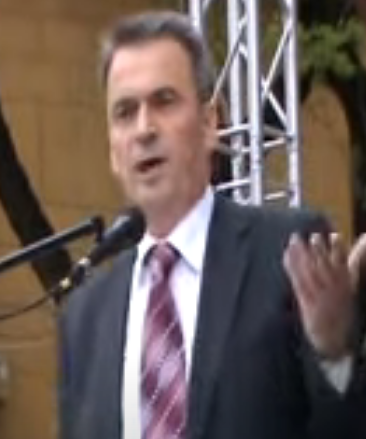
- Mirčić in 2016

Minister of the Serb Diaspora in the Government of Serbia
- In office 24 March 1998 – 24 October 2000
- Preceded by: Radovan Pankov
- Succeeded by: Vojislav Vukčević

Mayor of Novi Sad
- In office 13 January 1993 – 24 June 1994
- Preceded by: Vladimir Divjaković
- Succeeded by: Milorad Đurđević (interim), then Đuro Bajić

Member of the National Assembly of the Republic of Serbia
- In office 3 June 2016 – 3 August 2020
- In office 25 January 1993 – 14 February 2007

Member of the Assembly of Vojvodina (Serbian Radical Party List MP)
- In office 16 July 2008 – 22 June 2012

Member of the Assembly of Vojvodina for Novi Sad Division 7
- In office 30 October 2004 – 16 July 2008
- Preceded by: redistribution
- Succeeded by: Srboljub Bubnjević

Personal details
- Born: 22 February 1956 Maleševci, PR Bosnia and Herzegovina, Yugoslavia
- Died: 9 May 2025 (aged 69) Novi Sad, Serbia
- Party: Serbian Radical Party

Milorad Mirčić (Serbian Cyrillic: Милорад Мирчић; 22 February 1956 – 9 May 2025) was a Serbian politician. He was the mayor of Novi Sad from 1993 to 1994 and the minister of the Serb diaspora in the Serbian government from 1998 to 2000, and was elected to public office several times at the republican, provincial, and local levels. Mirčić was a member of the far-right Serbian Radical Party (SRS).

== Background ==
Mirčić was born in the village of Maleševci, in what was then the People's Republic of Bosnia and Herzegovina in the Federal People's Republic of Yugoslavia. He graduated from the Faculty of Technology in 1986 as an engineer, specializing in the field of synthetic polymers, and worked for many years at Novkabel.

== Politician ==
=== Early years (1992–1998) ===
Mirčić was the Radical Party's candidate for Novi Sad's fourth division in the May 1992 Vojvodina provincial election and sought election to the Novi Sad city assembly in the concurrent Serbian local elections. He was defeated in both contests.

==== Mayor of Novi Sad ====
Mirčić was elected to the Novi Sad assembly in the December 1992 Serbian local elections. The overall result of the election in the city was a virtual three-way tie between the Radicals, the Socialist Party of Serbia (SPS), and an alliance of Serbia's democratic opposition parties. The Radicals and Socialists formed a coalition government in January 1993, and Mirčić was chosen as assembly president, a position that was at the time equivalent to mayor. He was little known in political circles at the time; Miroslav Negrojević, the leader of the Serbian Renewal Movement (SPO) in Novi Sad, remarked that his only qualification was his membership in the Radical Party.

Mirčić's mayoral term began in the same month that Bill Clinton was inaugurated as president of the United States. Mirčić attracted some notoriety in this period by saying he had two advantages over Clinton: he was younger and more attractive, and he had never cheated on his wife. While in office, he oversaw a campaign to remove the names of Tito and other communist-era officials from the city's infrastructure and replace them with other names from Serbia's past, including those of Četnik officials such as Petar Bojović. He also removed a number of the city's multilingual signs, increased the use of the Cyrillic script, and twinned Novi Sad with Ilioupoli in Greece.

He was defeated in a non-confidence vote in June 1994, having by this time lost the support of the Socialist Party. A writer sympathetic to the Radicals has suggested that Mirčić's continued support for Bosnian Serb forces in the Bosnian War, when the Serbian government was withholding aid and supplies to the Republika Srpska, contributed to his downfall. Mirčić's ill-timed diplomatic visit to Ilioupoli during a period of economic hardship in Novi Sad was also described as a factor. The Radicals served in opposition for the remainder of the term.

==== Parliamentarian ====
Mirčić received the sixth position on the Radical Party's electoral list for Novi Sad in the 1992 Serbian general election, which took place concurrently with the December 1992 local elections. The Radicals won ten seats in the division, and Mirčić was included in his party's assembly delegation. (From 1992 to 2000, Serbia's electoral law stipulated that one-third of parliamentary mandates would be assigned to candidates from successful lists in numerical order, while the remaining two-thirds would be distributed amongst other candidates at the discretion of the sponsoring parties. Mirčić was not automatically elected by virtue of his list position.)

The governing Socialists won the 1992 election but fell short of a majority with 101 seats out of 250. The Radicals finished in second place with seventy-three seats. While the SRS was technically in opposition for the parliament that followed, it initially worked with the Socialists in an informal alliance. The partnership had dissolved by late 1993, however, and a new election was called for December of that year.

Mirčić received the fourth position on the Radical Party's list for Novi Sad in the 1993 parliamentary election. The party won seven seats in the division, and he was again given an "optional" mandate. The Socialists won the election with 123 out of 250 seats and afterward formed a new government with support from the New Democracy (ND) party. The Radicals fell to thirty-nine seats and remained in opposition.

Mirčić disrupted the proceedings of the assembly in September 1994 to demand an emergency debate on the recent arrest of Radical Party leader Vojislav Šešelj. When he refused to yield the floor, speaker Dragan Tomić suspended the sitting.

In July 1995, the leadership of the breakaway Serbian Radical Party – Nikola Pašić (SRS-NP) accused Mirčić and two other SRS parliamentarians of physically preventing Radical Party dissident Aleksandar Đurić from entering the assembly. In the same month, the Wall Street Journal quoted Mirčić as saying at a Radical Party rally, "I want to create a country called Greater Serbia, with one parliament, one president, one army. We will not stop till our enemies are crushed."

In 1996, after the conclusion of the Bosnian War, Mirčić held a press conference in which he accused Serbian president Slobodan Milošević of planning to assassinate Bosnian Serb leader Radovan Karadžić, "because he is afraid that Karadžić might go to the Hague (war crimes tribunal) and tell many unpleasant things there."

=== Cabinet minister (1998–2000) ===
Mirčić received the first position on the Radical Party's list for the smaller, redistributed Novi Sad division in the 1997 Serbian parliamentary election and was automatically re-elected when the list won three mandates. The Socialist Party's alliance again won the election with 110 seats, while the Radicals finished second with eighty-two. The Socialists later formed a coalition government with the Yugoslav Left (JUL) and the Radicals after the election, and on 24 March 1998 Mirčić was appointed as minister for the Serb diaspora in the second cabinet of Serbian prime minister Mirko Marjanović.

In November 1998, Mirčić gave an interview in which he discussed the position of Serbs in different republics of the former Socialist Federal Republic of Yugoslavia. He said that the Serb community in Slovenia had been "broken up because no attention [was] being devoted to ethnic minorities," while the government of Croatia, with the support of the western powers, was perpetrating a sham democracy while discriminating against the Serb community in various ways. He added that the situation in Bosnia and Herzegovina was similar to that in Croatia and that Serbs in Macedonia were "trying to secure their basic rights and form their association." In April 1999, after the start of the NATO bombing of Yugoslavia in the Kosovo War, Mirčić said that members of the Serbian national minority in Albania were being forced to flee to the Federal Republic of Yugoslavia due to physical threats and blackmail.

Mirčić met with recently dismissed Republika Srpska president Nikola Poplašen in September 1999, at a time when Poplašen was still attempting to exercise the office of the presidency and was engaged in a bitter power struggle with Republika Srpska prime minister Milorad Dodik. Mirčić and Poplašen discussed cooperation between Serbia and the Republika Srpska and the issue of dual citizenship; a joint statement after the meeting blamed Dodik and his administration for blocking links between the communities. Mirčić later said that Serbs in the Republika Srpska were in a worse position than any other Serb community in the Balkans, insofar as the international community was actively plotting to destroy their entity.

In October 1999, Mirčić organized a meeting in Belgrade of Serbian language journalists from the international diaspora. In his speech to the assembled group, he said, "We have withstood and repelled most brutal physical attacks and have shown that we are capable to fight and defend ourselves. Those who attacked us are now resorting to perfidious methods, not much different from the bombardments in force and intensity — a media war."

Mirčić's term in office came to an end on 24 October 2000, shortly after the 2000 Yugoslavian general election and the resulting fall of Slobodan Milošević. The SPS–JUL–SRS ministry fell from power after Milošević's defeat, and a transitional government came to power in Serbia pending a new national assembly election. The Radicals were not included in the new government and returned to opposition.

=== Parliamentarian after the fall of Milošević (2000–2007) ===
Serbia's electoral system was reformed prior to the December 2000 parliamentary election, with the entire country becoming a single at-large electoral division and all mandates being awarded to candidates on successful lists at the discretion of the sponsoring parties, irrespective of numerical order. Mirčić received the sixth position on the Radical Party's electoral list and was included in its assembly delegation after the list won twenty-three seats. The Democratic Opposition of Serbia (DOS) won a landslide victory, and the Radicals once again served in opposition.

Mirčić received the eighth position on the Radical Party's list in the 2003 parliamentary election and was awarded a mandate for a fifth assembly term after the party won eighty-two seats. While the Radicals were the largest party in the new assembly, they fell well short of a majority and ultimately remained in opposition for the term that followed. Mirčić chaired the defence and security committee. In November 2004, he and Venko Aleksandrov (the chair of Bulgaria's foreign policy, defence, and security committee) signed an accord for greater cooperation between their respective countries. The following year, Mirčić paid an official visit to Bulgaria in his role as committee chair. He also served on the administrative committee and the committee on relations with Serbs outside Serbia.

In March 2004, Mirčić accused ethnic Albanian separatists in Kosovo of overseeing coordinated actions against Serbs in the disputed territory and called for the Serbian government to take all necessary actions to protect the Kosovo Serb community. He condemned the burning of mosques in Belgrade and Niš in the same period. In December 2004, he said that Albanian separatists in Kosovo were "waiting for helicopters and state-of-the-art small arms to be delivered to them from Croatia" and accused them of planning a campaign of ethnic cleansing against Serbs.

Mirčić received the sixth position on the SRS's electoral lists in the 2007 and 2008 parliamentary elections, although he did not take a seat in parliament on either occasion.

=== Provincial politics (1996–2012) ===
Mirčić ran for Novi Sad's seventh division in the 1996 and 2000 provincial elections and was defeated both times.

The 2000 provincial election was the last to be held entirely by voting in single-member constituencies. Vojvodina subsequently adopted a system in which half of the assembly members were elected in constituencies and the other half by proportional representation. Mirčić was elected for Novi Sad's redistributed seventh division in the 2004 provincial election. As in the republican election a year earlier, the Radicals emerged as the largest party in the assembly but fell short of a majority and ultimately served in opposition. Mirčić led the Radical Party assembly group for the term that followed.

In early 2008, Mirčić accused the European Union of trying to turn Serbs into a minority in Vojvodina and to separate the province from Serbia by encouraging Serb refugees from Croatia to return to their former homes. His political rivals accused him of fomenting ethnic tensions. The Alliance of Vojvodina Hungarians (SVM) later condemned Mirčić's statement that inter-ethnic clashes could occur in Serbian communities with Hungarian majorities if Hungary recognized Kosovo's unilateral declaration of independence.

Mirčić was a Radical Party vice-president at the republic level in this period and continued to speak for the party on a variety of issues. He strongly opposed the prospect of Serbia joining the North Atlantic Treaty Organization (NATO) in 2007, saying, "The United States is creating hotspots in the world and NATO does the dirtiest work in the field. We do not want to be a part of that." He also said, "by joining NATO, [Serbia] would be making a major concession to the advocates of independence for Kosmet [Kosovo and Metohija], because the alliance's strategy is not to interfere in internal conflicts in its member-nations." Ultimately, Serbia did not join the military alliance.

Mirčić led the Radical Party's electoral list in the 2008 Vojvodina provincial election. The Radicals suffered an unexpectedly poor result in this election, winning only twenty-four seats out of 120 while the For a European Vojvodina (ZEV) alliance led by the Democratic Party (DS) won an outright majority. Mirčić continued to lead the Radical Party group in the assembly for the term that followed and, from the opposition benches, accused the provincial government of pursuing a secessionist agenda. He opposed the Statute of the Autonomous Province of Vojvodina, describing it as a blueprint for a "state within a state."

After the inconclusive outcome of the 2008 Serbian parliamentary election, which took place concurrently with the provincial vote, serious discussions took place between the Radical Party, the Democratic Party of Serbia (DSS), and the Socialist Party about forming a new coalition government. Rumours circulated that Mirčić would be appointed as minister of internal affairs. Ultimately, these plans came to nothing. The Socialists formed a coalition with the For a European Serbia (ZES) alliance, and the Radicals remained in opposition at the republic level.

Following the Serbian government's arrest and deportation of Radovan Karadžić in mid-2008, Mirčić accused United Kingdom Special Forces groups of having participated in the operation to capture Karadžić and described the government of Serbian president Boris Tadić as traitorous.

The Radical Party experienced a serious split in late 2008, with several members joining the more moderate Serbian Progressive Party (SNS) under the leadership of Tomislav Nikolić and Aleksandar Vučić. Mirčić, considered a prominent member of party leader Vojislav Šešelj's hardline faction, remained with the Radicals. When Nikolić set up a parliamentary group composed of ex-Radicals, Mirčić accused him of an illegal "snatching of mandates."

The Radicals, seriously weakened by the 2008 split, fell to only four seats in the Vojvodina Assembly in the 2012 provincial election. Mirčić was defeated in his bid for re-election in Novi Sad's seventh constituency seat.

=== Return to the Serbian parliament (2016–2020) ===
Serbia's electoral system was reformed again in 2011, such that all parliamentary mandates were awarded to candidates on successful lists in numerical order. Mirčić was not a candidate in the 2012 Serbian parliamentary election but received the fourth position on the Radical Party's list for the 2014 election. The party did not, on this occasion, cross the electoral threshold to win representation in the assembly.

Mirčić again appeared in the fourth position on the Radical Party's list for the 2016 parliamentary election and was elected to his sixth assembly term when the list won twenty-two seats. The Progressive Party and its allies won the election, and the Radicals again served in an opposition. In the 2016–2020 parliament, Mirčić was a member of the agriculture committee (Note: Formally known as the Agriculture, Forestry, and Water Management Committee.) and the finance committee; (Note: Formally known as the Committee on Finance, State Budget, and Control of Public Spending.) a deputy member of the administrative committee, (Note: Formally known as the Committee on Administrative, Budgetary, Mandate, and Immunity Issues.) the defence and internal affairs committee, and the security services control committee; a member of Serbia's delegation to the Interparliamentary Assembly on Orthodoxy; and a member of the parliamentary friendship groups with Belarus, Russia, and Venezuela.

During an assembly debate in 2017, Mirčić said to incoming cabinet minister Zorana Mihajlović, "If the future minister [...] could pull this dress back a little, you know, it seems provocative. I don't know how it looks to you, but I'm a man of flesh and blood." He was issued a fine by the assembly's administrative committee for this comment. At another assembly meeting in early 2020, he took part in a media stunt by saying that Mihajlović was "known for spending state money on personal things" and attempting to give her a "gift" of pink underwear. He was issued a reprimand by the assembly president. Generally, Mirčić and other members of the Radical Party sought to portray Mihajlović as a stooge of the United States during her time in office.

Mirčić was promoted to the second position on the Radical Party's list in the 2020 Serbian parliamentary election. In the 2022 parliamentary election, he appeared in the fifth position. In both cases, the list failed to cross the electoral threshold.

=== City politics in Novi Sad after 1994 ===
Mirčić served several terms in the Novi Sad city assembly after standing down as mayor in 1994.

He sought re-election to the city assembly in 1996 Serbian local elections and was defeated in the first round of balloting. He later ran for Novi Sad's sixty-ninth constituency seat in the 2000 Serbian local elections and, like all SRS candidates in the city during this cycle, was defeated. The 2000 vote was the last regular local election cycle in which members were elected in constituency seats; all subsequent local elections in Novi Sad have taken place under proportional representation.

Mirčić appeared in the seventh position on the Radical Party's list in the 2004 local elections and was elected to his second term in the city assembly when the list won thirty-four seats. The party won the election and afterward formed a coalition government with the Socialists and the DSS; Mirčić did not return to a leadership role but instead supported the administration in the assembly. He subsequently appeared in the second position on the party's list in the 2008 local elections. The SRS won twenty-six seats, and on this occasion he chose not to take a mandate.

Mirčić appeared in the second position on the Radical Party's lists for Novi Sad in the 2012, 2016, and 2020 Serbian local elections and was re-elected to the city assembly each time. The party served in opposition throughout this period. In August 2023, he was blocked by protesters from entering the city assembly and tried to push his way in; he later said that he had never before been restricted from exercising his duties as an elected official. He was not a candidate in the 2024 Serbian local elections.

== Death ==
Mirčić died in Novi Sad on 9 May 2025 at the age of 69.

== Electoral record ==
=== Provincial (Vojvodina) ===
2012 Vojvodina provincial election: Novi Sad Division 7
Candidate	Party	First round		Second round	
Candidate	Party	Votes	%	Votes	%
Srboljub Bubnjević (incumbent)	"Choice for a Better Vojvodina–Bojan Pajtić" (Affiliation: Democratic Party)	5,507	26.06	10,094	52.54
Petar Novaković	Let's Get Vojvodina Moving–Tomislav Nikolić (Serbian Progressive Party, New Serbia, Movement of Socialists, Strength of Serbia Movement)	5,080	24.04	9,117	47.46
Petar Krstić	League of Social Democrats of Vojvodina–Nenad Čanak	2,705	12.80		
Novak Trkulja	"Ivica Dačić–Socialist Party of Serbia (SPS)–Party of United Pensioners of Serbia (PUPS)–United Serbia (JS)–Social Democratic Party of Serbia (SDP Serbia)"	2,555	12.09		
Milorad Mirčić (list incumbent)	Serbian Radical Party	2,294	10.86		
Ostoja Simetić	Democratic Party of Serbia	1,037	4.91		
Milja Obradović	Maja Gojković–United Regions of Serbia	985	4.66		
Željko Milešev	Serb Democratic Party	968	4.58		
Total		21,131	100.00	19,211	100.00

2004 Vojvodina provincial election: Novi Sad Division 7
Candidate	Party	First round		Second round	
Candidate	Party	Votes	%	Votes	%
Milorad Mirčić	Serbian Radical Party	5,012	44.08	8,993	67.49
Miloš Račić	"Democratic Party–Boris Tadić"	1,935	17.02	4,331	32.51
Miroslav Kopanja	Socialist Party of Serbia	1,629	14.33		
Milan Paroški	New Serbia	1,337	11.76		
Mirko Šipovac	Democratic Party of Serbia	582	5.12		
Milorad Rajić	Clean Hands of Vojvodina–SPO, Reformists of Vojvodina, Otpor–Miodrag Mile Isakov–Vuk Drašković	574	5.05		
Zoran Subotić	Citizen's Group: Community of Serbs of Croatia and Bosnia and Herzegovina	300	2.64		
Total		11,369	100.00	13,324	100.00
Valid votes		11,369	95.70	13,324	96.34
Invalid/blank votes		511	4.30	506	3.66
Total votes		11,880	100.00	13,830	100.00

2000 Vojvodina provincial election: Novi Sad Division 7
Candidate	Party	First round		Second round	
Candidate	Party	Votes	%	Votes	%
Dragan Milošević	Democratic Opposition of Serbia (Affiliation: Democratic Party)		47.47		63.55
Rade Bajić	Socialist Party of Serbia–Yugoslav Left (Affiliation: Socialist Party of Serbia)		30.55		23.28
Milorad Mirčić	Serbian Radical Party		?		11.24
other candidates?					
Total					
Source: All percentages listed are preliminary.

1996 Vojvodina provincial election: Novi Sad Division 7 (Second Round)
Candidate	Party	Votes	%
Svetislav Krstić	Socialist Party of Serbia		elected
Milorad Mirčić	Serbian Radical Party		
Dr. Svetozar Sečen (incumbent for Novi Sad Division 8)	Zajedno (Coalition Together) (Affiliation: Serbian Renewal Movement)		
Total			
Source: Mirčić and Sečen are listed alphabetically.

May 1992 Vojvodina provincial election: Novi Sad Division 4
Candidate	Party	Votes	%
Mirko Cvjetićanin	Socialist Party of Serbia		elected in the second round
Milorad Mirčić	Serbian Radical Party		defeated in the second round
Siniša Šuša	Serb Democratic Party–People's Party		
Total			

=== Local (Novi Sad) ===
2000 Novi Sad city election: Division 69
Candidate	Party	Votes	%
Milorad Mirčić	Serbian Radical Party		defeated
other candidates			
Total			

December 1992 Novi Sad city election: Division 69
Candidate	Party	Votes	%
Milorad Mirčić	Serbian Radical Party		elected
Dragoljub Bogovac	Citizens' Group		
Relja Knežević	Democratic Party–Reform Democratic Party of Vojvodina–Democratic Movement of Serbia		
Boško Pilipović (incumbent)	Socialist Party of Serbia		
Total			
Source: All candidates except Mirčić are listed alphabetically.

May 1992 Novi Sad city election: Division 18
Candidate	Party	Votes	%
Slavko Maletić	Socialist Party of Serbia		elected
Milorad Mirčić	Serbian Radical Party		
Siniša Šuša	Serb Democratic Party–People's Party		
Total			
Source: Mirčić and Šuša are listed alphabetically.
