= Srboljub =

Srboljub is a masculine given name.

- Srboljub Bubnjević (born 1966), politician and administrator in Serbia
- Srboljub Krivokuća (1928–2002), Yugoslav-Serbian football manager and player
- Srboljub Markušević (1936–2019), Yugoslav-Serbian professional footballer and football manager
- Srboljub Milenković (born 1955), Kosovo Serb medical doctor and politician
- Srboljub Nikolić (1965–2022), Serbian football player and manager
- Srboljub Stamenković (1956–1996), Yugoslav footballer
- Srboljub Živanović (born 1953), Serbian politician
