= Rade Bajić =

Serbian politician (born 1947)

Rade Bajić (Serbian Cyrillic: Раде Бајић; born 26 September 1947) is a Serbian politician. He was a delegate in the Serbian parliament from 2001 to 2004, served on the Novi Sad city council in 2012, and was elected to several terms in the Novi Sad city assembly. Bajić is a member of the Socialist Party of Serbia (SPS).

== Early life and private career ==
Bajić was born in the settlement of Gerzovo in the municipality of Mrkonjić Grad, in what was then the People's Republic of Bosnia and Herzegovina in the Federal People's Republic of Yugoslavia. He is a graduated economist and was at one time the president of the Borac football club in Klisa, a neighbourhood of Novi Sad.

== Politician ==
=== The Miloševic Years (1992–2000) ===
Bajić was elected to the Novi Sad city assembly in the May 1992 Serbian local elections, winning over a single opponent in the city's thirtieth division. The Socialists won a landslide majority with fifty-eight out of seventy seats, and he supported the local administration in the assembly.

The May 1992 vote was boycotted by several opposition parties, and widespread doubts about its legitimacy led the Serbian government to call new elections in December 1992. Bajić was re-elected for the thirtieth division as the Socialists fell to twenty-one seats overall. (Note: The SPS seat total includes one delegate elected with a dual endorsement from the Socialist Party and the Novi Sad Ecological Movement.) The SPS formed a government with the far-right Serbian Radical Party (SRS) after the election, and Bajić remained a government supporter. In 1993, he was appointed as director of the public heating utility Toplana; in this capacity, he faced criticism for fuel shortages and freezing apartments during the period of sanctions against Yugoslavia.

Bajić was re-elected for Novi Sad's thirtieth division in the 1996 Serbian local elections, in which the Socialists fell to only six seats overall. The Zajedno coalition formed a new government after the election, and the Socialists moved into opposition. Bajić led the SPS group in the city assembly. Despite the change in government, he continued to serve as director of Toplana until 1998; a 1997 news report identified him as the only utility director in the city who was a member of the Socialist Party.

During the 1990s, the political landscape of Serbia and Yugoslavia was dominated by the authoritarian rule of SPS leader Slobodan Milošević and his allies. Milošević was defeated by Democratic Opposition of Serbia (DOS) candidate Vojislav Koštunica in the 2000 Yugoslavian presidential election and subsequently fell from power after popular protests, a watershed moment in Serbian politics.

Bajić was elected to a fourth term in the Novi Sad assembly in the 2000 Serbian local elections, which took place concurrently with the Yugoslavian vote. The Socialists, operating in an alliance with the Yugoslav Left (JUL), increased their representation in the city assembly to ten seats but still lost to the DOS by a significant margin. This was the last local election cycle in which candidates were elected for single-member constituencies; all subsequent local elections in Novi Sad have been held under proportional representation. Bajić again led the Socialist group in the city assembly for the term that followed.

Bajić ran for Novi Sad's seventh division in the 2000 Vojvodina provincial election, which was also held concurrently with the Yugoslavian vote, and finished a distant second against the DOS's candidate.

=== After the fall of Milošević (2000–20) ===
The Serbian government fell after Milošević's defeat in the Yugoslavian election, and a new Serbian parliamentary election was called for December 2000. Prior to the vote, Serbia's electoral laws were changed so that the entire country became a single electoral district and all mandates were assigned to candidates on successful electoral lists at the discretion of the sponsoring parties or coalitions, irrespective of numerical order. Bajić appeared in the ninth position on the Socialist Party's list, which was mostly alphabetical. The Socialists won thirty-seven seats, and Bajić was awarded a mandate, taking his seat when the assembly convened in January 2001. The DOS won a landslide victory with 176 out of 250 seats, and the Socialists served in opposition for the term that followed. Bajić chaired the assembly committee on relations with Serbs outside Serbia.

Bajić was not a candidate in the 2003 parliamentary election, and his parliamentary term ended when the new assembly met in early 2004. The SPS fell to only three seats in Novi Sad in the 2004 local elections, and his term in the city assembly also came to an end in that year.

From 2005 to 2010, he was the commercial manager for the Toplana utility.

Bajić appeared in the thirty-eighth position on the Socialist Party's list in the 2007 Serbian parliamentary election. The list won sixteen seats, and he was not given a mandate. He later received the eighth position on the SPS's list for Novi Sad in the 2008 local elections and did not return to the assembly when the list fell below the electoral threshold for assembly representation.

Serbia's electoral laws were again reformed in 2011, such that all mandates in elections held under proportional representation were assigned to candidates on successful lists in numerical order. Bajić appeared in the thirteenth position on the SPS's list in the 2012 local elections and was not elected when the list won seven seats. An alliance led by the Democratic Party (DS) won a narrow victory in the election and established a coalition government that included the Socialists. Bajić was appointed to the city council (i.e., the executive branch of the municipal government) with responsibility for traffic and roads. His term in office was brief. The DS-led administration lost its assembly majority later the year, and the Serbian Progressive Party (SNS) formed a new coalition government. Although the Socialists were part of the new administration, Bajić was dropped from the executive.

He later appeared on the Socialist Party's list in the 2016 and 2020 local elections, although he was not elected on either occasion. (Note: Bajić received the tenth position on the SPS's list in 2016 and was not elected when the list won seven seats. In 2020, he appeared in the forty-ninth position and was not elected when the list won ten seats.)

== Electoral record ==
=== Provincial (Vojvodina) ===
2000 Vojvodina provincial election: Novi Sad Division 7
Candidate	Party	First round		Second round	
Candidate	Party	Votes	%	Votes	%
Dragan Milošević	Democratic Opposition of Serbia (Affiliation: Democratic Party)		47.47		63.55
Rade Bajić	Socialist Party of Serbia–Yugoslav Left (Affiliation: Socialist Party of Serbia)		30.55		23.28
Milorad Mirčić	Serbian Radical Party		?		11.24
other candidates?					
Total					
Source: All percentages listed are preliminary.

=== Local (Novi Sad) ===
2000 Novi Sad city election: Division 30?
Candidate	Party	Votes	%
Rade Bajić (incumbent)	Socialist Party of Serbia–Yugoslav Left (Affiliation: Socialist Party of Serbia)		elected
other candidates			
Total			

1996 Novi Sad city election: Division 30 (Second Round)
Candidate	Party	Votes	%
Rade Bajić (incumbent)	Socialist Party of Serbia		elected
Zoran Ðaković	Serbian Radical Party		
Total			

December 1992 Novi Sad city election: Division 30
Candidate	Party	Votes	%
Rade Bajić (incumbent)	Socialist Party of Serbia		elected
Srboljub Bubnjević	Reform Democratic Party of Vojvodina–Democratic Party		
Darko Radović	Serb Democratic Party–People's Party		
Zoran Hajder	Serbian Radical Party		
Total			
Source: All candidates except Bajić are listed alphabetically.

May 1992 Novi Sad city election: Division 30
Candidate	Party	Votes	%
Rade Bajić	Socialist Party of Serbia		elected
Sretko Mihajlović	Serb Democratic Party		
Total			
Source: Mirčić and Šuša are listed alphabetically.
