= Venko =

Venko (Esperanto for victory) is a male Slavic given name. Notable people with the name include:

- Venko Aleksandrov (born 1944), Bulgarian academic, medical doctor and politician
- Venko Andonovski (born 1964), Macedonian writer, essayist, critic and literary theorist
- Venko Filipče (born 1977), Macedonian neurosurgeon and former Health Minister
- Venko Markovski (1915–1988), Bulgarian-Macedonian writer, poet, partisan and Communist politician
