= Aleksandar Đurić (disambiguation) =

Aleksandar Đurić (born 1970) is a Singaporean footballer.

Aleksandar Đurić may also refer to:

- Aleksandar Đurić (basketball) (born 1982), Austrian basketball coach and player
- Aleksandar Đurić (politician) (born 1930), Serbian politician
