= President of the City Assembly of Novi Sad =

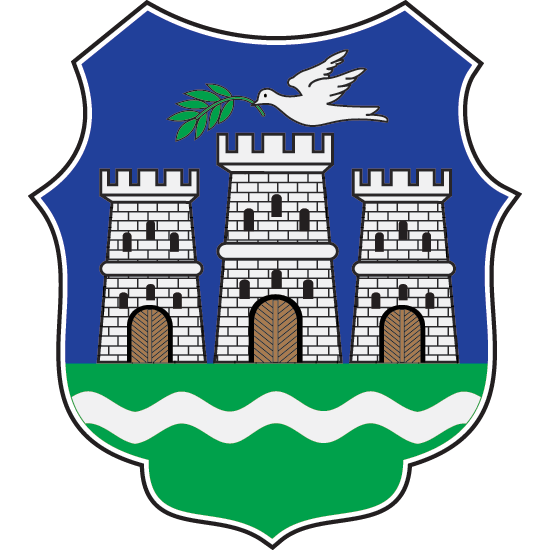
- Coat of arms of Novi Sad
- Incumbent; Jelena Marinković Radomirović since 21 August 2020
- Style: President
- Residence: No official residence
- Seat: City Hall
- Appointer: City Assembly
- Term length: 4 years
- Inaugural holder: Zoran Vučević
- Formation: 29 November 2004
- Deputy: Branka Bežanov

The President of the City Assembly of Novi Sad is the speaker of the City Assembly of Novi Sad (the second largest city in Serbia and the administrative seat of the Autonomous Province of Vojvodina). The President's term lasts four years, and is elected by members of each new assembly. The current President of the City Assembly of Novi Sad is Jelena Marinković Radomirović (SNS), since 21 August 2020.

The offices of the President of the City Assembly of Novi Sad and the Mayor of Novi Sad were merged and held by the same person until 2004, when they were separated.

== Office ==
According to the current legislation, the City Assembly elects the President and Deputy President of the City Assembly of Novi Sad from the complement of the councilors for the four years’ term.

== Authorities (competences) ==
- Organizing the work of the City Assembly;
- Summoning sessions, suggesting the agenda and presiding over the City Assembly sessions;
- Looking after implementation of the transparency of work of the City Assembly;
- Signing bylaws adopted by the City Assembly, and
- Performing any other operations entrusted by the City Assembly.

== List of presidents ==
Portrait	Name (Birth–Death)	Term of office			Political party
Portrait	Name (Birth–Death)	Took office	Left office	Time in office	Political party
	Zoran Vučević	29 November 2004	16 June 2008	3 years, 200 days	Serbian Radical Party
	Aleksandar Jovanović (born 1976)	16 June 2008	29 June 2012	4 years, 13 days	League of Social Democrats of Vojvodina
	Aleksandra Jerkov (born 1982)	29 June 2012	14 September 2012	77 days	League of Social Democrats of Vojvodina
	Sinišia Sević (born 1972)	14 September 2012	13 March 2015	2 years, 180 days	Socialist Party of Serbia
	Jelena Crnogorac (born 1982)	13 March 2015	17 June 2016	1 year, 96 days	United Serbia
	Zdravko Jelušić (born 1960)	17 June 2016	21 August 2020	4 years, 65 days	Serbian Progressive Party
	Jelena Marinković Radomirović (born 1987)	21 August 2020	Incumbent	6 years, 17 days	Serbian Progressive Party

== See also ==
- List of mayors of Novi Sad
