= Svetislav Krstić =

Serbian politician and researcher (born 1955)

Svetislav Krstić (Serbian Cyrillic: Светислав Крстић; born 18 January 1955) is a retired Serbian academic, administrator, and politician. He was the mayor of Zrenjanin from 1989 to 1992, the president of the Vojvodina provincial assembly from 1992 to 1993, and a member of the Serbian parliament from 2004 to 2007. He also served as president of Srbijagas from 2005 to 2008. A member of the Socialist Party of Serbia (SPS) for most of his political career, Krstić joined the Serbian Progressive Party (SNS) soon after its founding.

== Early life and private career ==
Krstić was born in Zrenjanin, Autonomous Province of Vojvodina, in what was then the People's Republic of Serbia in the Federal People's Republic of Yugoslavia. He received a Ph.D. in atomic physics in 1987 and taught at the Technical Faculty Mihajlo Pupin at the Zrenjanin branch of the University of Novi Sad. At the time of his election as mayor, he was the department's interim dean.

He is also an experienced hunter and a member of Safari Club International. In 2019, he published a book entitled, Pripovetke Iz Lova (Hunting Stories).

== Politician ==
=== Mayor of Zrenjanin (1989–92) ===
Krstić was elected as the mayor of Zrenjanin in the 1989 Serbian local elections, the last to be held while the country was a one-party socialist republic. The method of election was somewhat complicated: after the election of the city assembly delegates, the candidates for mayor competed against one another in a popular vote (described as a referendum), and the city assembly then selected the mayor from the two candidates who received the most votes. Krstić finished first in a field of six candidates in the popular vote on 10 December and, after winning some key endorsements, was chosen as mayor in the assembly five days later by an overwhelming majority. Only thirty-four years old at the time, he emphasized themes of youth engagement and greater scientific research in his campaign.

Krstić served as mayor during the collapse of the Socialist Federal Republic of Yugoslavia and the beginning of the Yugoslav Wars of the 1990s. He joined the Socialist Party of Serbia when the party was formed in 1990.

=== President of the Vojvodina Assembly (1992–93) ===
Krstić was elected to the Vojvodina provincial assembly in the May 1992 provincial election, winning Zrenjanin's fifth division without opposition in the first round of voting. The Socialists won a landslide victory in the election, due in part to a boycott by many of Serbia's leading opposition parties. When the new assembly convened on 2 July 1992, Krstić was named as its president.

In May 1992, several prominent members of the far-right Serbian Radical Party (SRS), including party leader Vojislav Šešelj, came to the village of Hrtkovci in Ruma, calling for the expulsion of ethnic Croats from the area and reading lists of individual Croat residents who were "encouraged" to leave for Croatia. Many Croats did, in fact, leave the area during this period; this occurred against the backdrop of the ongoing war in Croatia. When asked about this situation, Krstić said, "The phenomenon of forced emigration is condemned by the public in Vojvodina and the entire Republic. Although they do not have a wider character and are narrowly located, these phenomena are subject to sanctions by the competent state authorities. All citizens, regardless of nationality, must be provided with protection of their rights and material goods, and conditions for living and working must be provided." He added, however, that some instances of individuals leaving the area for personal reasons were being inappropriately subsumed under the category of "ethnic resettlement."

As president of the assembly, Krstić faced complaints from municipal officials dealing with the effects of fuel shortages and inadequate cash supplies. He argued that the province was working to improve the situation, including by designing a more effective strategy for education funding and introducing measures to bypass the republican authorities in health funding.

Due to widespread doubts about the legitimacy of the May 1992 provincial election, a new election was called for December 1992, concurrently with new federal, republican, and local elections. Krstić presided over the provincial assembly on 11 November 1992 when it adopted the rules for the upcoming vote. In the course of this session, the Socialist majority approved an amendment presented by the assembly group of the Radical Party, the Serb Democratic Party (SDS), and the independent delegates for the election to be held under first past the post rules. The Democratic Fellowship of Vojvodina Hungarians (VMDK) argued in favour of introducing proportional representation, as had been done at the federal and republican levels; Krstić opposed this on the grounds that it was impracticable, as it would require revisions to several documents including the provincial statute and would result in the elections being delayed.

Krstić was defeated in the December 1992 provincial election by Miodrag Maksić, who ran as a "fusion" candidate of Serbia's democratic opposition parties. His term as assembly president ended when the new assembly convened in early 1993. The first-past-the-post method of election proved to be a short-lived experiment and was subsequently overturned.

Krstić worked afterward for Naftna Industrija Srbije (NIS), serving as director of its development sector.

=== Return to the provincial assembly (1997–2000) ===
Krstić was re-elected to the Vojvodina assembly in the 1996 provincial election, this time winning in Novi Sad's seventh division. He took his seat when the new assembly convened in January 1997. The Socialist Party won a majority victory in the election; Krstić did not return to a leadership role in the assembly but served as a supporter of the administration.

During the 1990s, Serbia's political landscape was dominated by the authoritarian rule of SPS leader Slobodan Milošević and his allies. Milošević was defeated by Democratic Opposition of Serbia (DOS) candidate Vojislav Koštunica in the 2000 Yugoslavian presidential election and subsequently fell from power on 5 October 2000 after days of popular protests. This was a watershed moment in Serbian politics.

Krstić was defeated in his did for re-election to the Vojvodina assembly in the 2000 provincial election, which took place concurrently with the Yugoslavian vote. On 10 March 2001, he was named as leader of the SPS's organization in Novi Sad.

=== Parliamentarian (2004–07) ===
Following a reform of Serbia's electoral system in 2000, the entire country became a single division for parliamentary elections, and all national assembly mandates were awarded to candidates on successful lists at the discretion of the sponsoring parties or coalitions, irrespective of numerical order. Krstić appeared in the 123rd position on the Socialist Party's electoral list in the 2003 Serbian parliamentary election and was included in his party's assembly delegation after the list won twenty-two mandates. He took his seat when the assembly convened in January 2004. Although the Socialists were not part of the government during the parliament that followed, they provided vital support to the administration in the assembly. Krstić served on the education committee and the committee on science and technological development.

He was also elected to the Novi Sad city assembly in the 2004 Serbian local elections, which were held under a system of proportional representation. The SPS won three seats in the assembly, and Krstić served afterward as the group's leader. In this period, the Socialists were part of a local coalition government led by the Radical Party, and Krstić served as a supporter of the administration.

Krstić was appointed as president of Srbijagas's board of directors on 21 September 2005.

He was not a candidate in the 2007 Serbian parliamentary election. Later in 2007, he left the Socialist Party and sat in the Novi Sad assembly as an independent. A news report in April 2007 identified him as the chair of Novi Sad's security council. He did not seek re-election at the local level in 2008.

In early 2008, his term as president of Srbijagas came to an end. After Dušan Bajatović became general director of the company later in the year, he was removed from the management structure entirely and given the role of an advisor. He was later very critical of the political oversight of the company during his time as president, and in 2013 he was the only company employee to share his views for a B92 investigative piece in defiance of a company gag order.

=== Serbian Progressive Party candidate (2012) ===
Krstić later joined the Serbian Progressive Party. In the 2012 Vojvodina provincial election, he ran as the SNS's candidate for Novi Sad's sixth division. He was defeated in the second round of voting. He was also a nominal SNS candidate for the Novi Sad assembly in the concurrent 2012 Serbian local elections, appearing in the sixty-eighth position on the party's list. The list won fifteen seats, and he was not elected. (After a further electoral reform in 2011, all mandates in Serbian election; held under proportional representation were assigned to candidates on successful lists in numerical order.)

He appears to have withdrawn from political life after this time.

== After politics ==
In 2021, Krstić retired with his wife to an observatory he had previously constructed on his family's property in an isolated part of the southern Kučaj mountain range. As this is the least populated area of Serbia, it provides a clear view of the planets and stars. Krstić has said that he moved to this area primarily for his enjoyment, noting also that some of his recordings (including of the Transit of Venus and a supernova explosion) have been published on professional astronomy portals.

== Electoral record ==
=== Provincial (Vojvodina) ===
2012 Vojvodina provincial election: Novi Sad Division 6
Candidate	Party	First round		Second round	
Candidate	Party	Votes	%	Votes	%
Goran Paunović	"Choice for a Better Vojvodina–Bojan Pajtić" (Affiliation: Democratic Party)	5,236	19.68	12,180	54.30
Svetislav Krstić	Let's Get Vojvodina Moving–Tomislav Nikolić (Serbian Progressive Party, New Serbia, Movement of Socialists, Strength of Serbia Movement) (Affiliation: Serbian Progressive Party)	5,767	21.68	10,251	45.70
Maja Timotijević	League of Social Democrats of Vojvodina–Nenad Čanak	4,324	16.25		
Blažo Vujović	"Ivica Dačić–Socialist Party of Serbia (SPS)–Party of United Pensioners of Serbia (PUPS)–United Serbia (JS)–Social Democratic Party of Serbia (SDP Serbia)" (Affiliation: Socialist Party of Serbia)	3,389	12.74		
Miloš Tubić	Democratic Party of Serbia	2,527	9.50		
Snežana Mušicki	Serbian Radical Party	2,158	8.11		
Jovan Ćirić	U-Turn	1,633	6.14		
Siniša Kovačević	Maja Gojković–United Regions of Serbia	1,572	5.91		
Total		26,606	100.00	22,431	100.00

2000 Vojvodina provincial election: Novi Sad Division 6
Candidate	Party	First round		Second round	
Candidate	Party	Votes	%	Votes	%
Mile Mandić	Democratic Opposition of Serbia (Affiliation: New Democracy)		55.60		64.08
Svetislav Krstić (incumbent for Novi Sad Division 7)	Socialist Party of Serbia		29		18.76
Zoran Mašić	Serbian Radical Party		?		15.68
Total					
Source: All percentages listed are preliminary; Mandić ultimately did not receive enough votes to win election in the first round.

1996 Vojvodina provincial election: Novi Sad Division 7 (Second Round)
Candidate	Party	Votes	%
Svetislav Krstić	Socialist Party of Serbia		elected
Milorad Mirčić	Serbian Radical Party		
Dr. Svetozar Sečen (incumbent for Novi Sad Division 8)	Zajedno (Coalition Together) (Affiliation: Serbian Renewal Movement)		
Total			
Source: Mirčić and Sečen are listed alphabetically. Mirčić finished first in the first round of voting.

December 1992 Vojvodina provincial election: Zrenjanin Division 5
Candidate	Party	Votes	%
Miodrag Maksić	Democratic Coalition		elected
Svetislav Krstić (incumbent)	Socialist Party of Serbia		
Milan Josimov	Serbian Radical Party		
Branislav Pajić	Serb Democratic Party		
Zvonko Vujin	People's Party		
Total			

May 1992 Vojvodina provincial election: Zrenjanin Division 5
Candidate	Party	Votes	%
Svetislav Krstić	Socialist Party of Serbia	5,134	elected without opposition in the first round
Total			

=== Local (Zrenjanin) ===
1989 Zrenjanin city election: Mayor of Zrenjanin
Candidate	Party	Votes	%
Svetislav Krstić	Socialist Alliance	18,563	
Slobodan Grbić	Socialist Alliance	16,522	
Dragan Ćuk	Socialist Alliance		
Miodrag Dostanić	Socialist Alliance		
Svetozar Jović	Socialist Alliance		
Radojica Madjarov	Socialist Alliance		
Total			
Source: All candidates except Krstić and Grbić are listed alphabetically. The city assembly chose Krstić as mayor over Grbić by a vote of 124 to 9.
