= Serb Democratic Party =

Serbian Democratic Party or Serb Democratic Party (Serbian: Српска демократска Странка, СДС or Srpska Demokratska Stranka, SDS) may refer to:

- Serb Democratic Party (Bosnia and Herzegovina), major Serb nationalist party established in 1990 and based in Banja Luka, active in Republika Srpska and Bosnia and Herzegovina
- Serb Democratic Party (Croatia), defunct Serb nationalist party in Croatia, established in 1990 and dissolved in 1995, formerly based in Knin
- Serb Democratic Party (Serbia, 1990–2003), defunct Serb nationalist party in Serbia
- Serb Democratic Party (Serbia, 2011), defunct Serb nationalist party established in 2011 and based in Novi Sad

== See also ==
- Democratic Serb Party (Montenegro)
- Democratic Party (Serbia)
- Democratic Party of Serbia
- Democratic Party of Serbs in Macedonia
