= Milan Novaković =

Serbian politician (born 1963)

Milan Novaković (Serbian Cyrillic: Милан Новаковић; born 9 November 1963) is a politician in Serbia. He served in the National Assembly of Serbia from 2014 to 2016 and is now the chief of the South Bačka District. Novaković is a member of the Serbian Progressive Party.

== Early life and career ==
Novaković was born in Kikinda, Vojvodina, in what was then the Socialist Republic of Serbia in the Socialist Federal Republic of Yugoslavia. He graduated from the University of Novi Sad in 1990 with a degree in agricultural engineering. He subsequently worked with Agrovojvodina from 1991 to 1993, with Nomico d.o.o. from 1994 to 2005, and with Dunav osiguranje from 2007 to 2012. In September 2012, he became acting director of JKP Gradsko Zelenilo in Novi Sad. He has also been manager of the public agency for agriculture and small business in Kikinda.

== Politician ==
Novaković sought election to the Assembly of Vojvodina in the 2012 Vojvodina provincial election, placing third in Novi Sad's third single-member district. He also received the sixty-fourth position (out of seventy-eight) on the Progressive Party's electoral list for the city assembly of Novi Sad in the 2012 Serbian local elections. This was too low a position for election to be a realistic prospect, and he was not elected as the list won fifteen mandates.

He received the 158th position on the Progressive Party's Aleksandar Vučić — Future We Believe In list for the national assembly in the 2014 Serbian parliamentary election and was elected when the list won a landslide victory with exactly 158 mandates. For the next two years, he served in parliament as a supporter of the ministry. He was promoted to the 139th position on the successor Aleksandar Vučić – Serbia Is Winning list in the 2016 parliamentary election and missed election when the list won 131 mandates. Later in the year, he was appointed to a five-year term as chief of the South Bačka District. He had the opportunity to return to the national assembly in 2017 as the replacement for another member, but he chose not to.

== Electoral record ==
=== Provincial (Vojvodina) ===
2012 Vojvodina assembly election Novi Sad III (constituency seat) - First and Second Rounds
Veljko Krstonošić	Choice for a Better Vojvodina	4,055	19.91	8,596	55.42
Aleksandar Jovanović	League of Social Democrats of Vojvodina	4,229	20.77	6,916	44.58
Milan Novaković	Let's Get Vojvodina Moving (Affiliation: Serbian Progressive Party)	3,415	16.77		
Borko Ilić	Democratic Party of Serbia	3,033	14.89		
Vanja Božić	Serbian Radical Party	1,499	7.36		
Ratko Striković	Socialist Party of Serbia–Party of United Pensioners of Serbia–United Serbia–Social Democratic Party of Serbia	1,322	6.49		
Aleksandar Odžić	U-Turn	980	4.81		
Slobodan Maraš	United Regions of Serbia	869	4.27		
Novak Vukoje	Social Democratic Alliance	576	2.83		
Jovan Mihajilo	Serb Democratic Party	387	1.90		
Total valid votes		20,365	100	15,512	100
