= Borko Ilić =

Serbian politician (born 1980)

Borko Ilić (Serbian Cyrillic: Борко Илић; born 24 July 1980) is a politician in Serbia. He has held public office at the municipal, provincial, and republic levels as a member of the Democratic Party of Serbia (Demokratska stranka Srbije, DSS). Ilić is now a member of Healthy Serbia (Zdrava Srbija, ZS).

== Early life and career ==
Ilić was born in Novi Sad, Vojvodina, in what was then the Socialist Republic of Serbia in the Socialist Federal Republic of Yugoslavia. He was raised in the city and earned a degree in French language and literature from the University of Novi Sad's Faculty of Philosophy. He has also studied management and was described in 2016 as a graduate economist.

== Politician ==
Ilić joined the DSS in 2001 and led its youth wing from 2002 to 2007. He was a member of the party executive during this time.

=== Member of the National Assembly ===
Ilić received the 163rd position on the DSS's electoral list in the 2003 Serbian parliamentary election. The list won fifty-three mandates, and he was not initially included in its national assembly delegation. (From 2000 to 2011, mandates in Serbian elections were awarded to parties or coalitions rather than to individual candidates, and it was common practice for the mandates to be assigned out of numerical order. Ilić could have been awarded a mandate when the assembly met in early 2004 notwithstanding his low position on the list, but he was not.) He was, however, awarded a mandate on 27 February 2006 as a replacement for Đorđe Čukvas. At the time, Ilić was the youngest member of the assembly. The DSS was the most dominant party in Serbia's coalition government during this sitting of the assembly, and Ilić served as a government supporter.

He was given the forty-first position on a combined DSS–New Serbia list in the 2007 parliamentary election and was selected for a second term when the list won forty-seven mandates. The DSS formed an unstable coalition government with the rival Democratic Party (Demokratska stranka, DS) after the election, the Ilić again served as a government supporter. In May 2007, he was chosen as chair of the assembly committee on youth and sport.

The DSS–DS alliance broke down in early 2008, and a new parliamentary election was held in May of that year. The DSS and New Serbia again ran in an alliance, and Ilić received the forty-fifth position on their list, which won thirty mandates. He was not included in the party's national assembly delegation this time but instead took a seat in the Vojvodina provincial assembly.

Serbia's electoral system was reformed in 2011, such that mandates were awarded in numerical order to candidates on successful lists. Ilić received the fiftieth position on the DSS list in the 2012 parliamentary election and was not elected when it won twenty-one mandates. He was subsequently given the fifty-ninth position on the party's list in the 2014 parliamentary election; on this occasion, the DSS did not cross the electoral threshold to win representation in the assembly.

The DSS formed an electoral alliance with Dveri in the 2016 Serbian parliamentary election, and Ilić received the eighteenth position on their combined list. The list won thirteen mandates, and he was again not returned.

=== Provincial politics ===
Ilić was given the fifth position on the DSS–New Serbia list for the Assembly of Vojvodina in the 2008 provincial election. The list won four seats, and he was included in the DSS's delegation. The DS and its allies won a majority victory in this election, and the DSS and New Serbia served in opposition. Ilić served as the leader of their parliamentary group.

Prior to 2016, half of the seats in the Vojvodina assembly were determined by proportional representation and the other half by constituency elections. Ilić was not included on the DSS's proportional list in the 2012 provincial election but instead sought re-election in Novi Sad's third division; he was defeated, finishing in fourth place. Vojvodina adopted a system of full proportional representation for the 2016 provincial election; Ilić was given the thirty-ninth position on the combined DSS–Dveri list, which did not cross the electoral threshold.

=== Municipal politics ===
Ilić was chosen as president of the DSS's Novi Sad city board in 2009. He appeared in the lead position on the DSS's electoral list for the Novi Sad city assembly in the 2012 Serbian local elections and was elected when the list won five mandates. In September of the same year, the DSS helped the Serbian Progressive Party form a new administration in the city, and Ilić was appointed as deputy mayor. He held this role until 2016, serving under Miloš Vučević. Ilić was also vice-president of the DSS at the republic level during this time; in this capacity, he spoke against Serbian membership in the European Union, arguing that the country should instead form stronger alliances with Russia, China, and Kazakhstan.

Ilić appeared in the lead position on the DSS–Dveri list for Novi Sad in the 2016 local elections. The list did not cross the electoral threshold.

=== Member of Healthy Serbia ===
Ilić subsequently left the DSS and joined Healthy Serbia. In 2020, he was appointed as a vice-president of the latter party.

== Electoral record ==
=== Provincial (Vojvodina) ===
2012 Vojvodina assembly election Novi Sad III (constituency seat) - First and Second Rounds
Veljko Krstonošić	Choice for a Better Vojvodina	4,055	19.91	8,596	55.42
Aleksandar Jovanović	League of Social Democrats of Vojvodina	4,229	20.77	6,916	44.58
Milan Novaković	Let's Get Vojvodina Moving (Affiliation: Serbian Progressive Party)	3,415	16.77		
Borko Ilić	Democratic Party of Serbia	3,033	14.89		
Vanja Božić	Serbian Radical Party	1,499	7.36		
Ratko Striković	Socialist Party of Serbia–Party of United Pensioners of Serbia–United Serbia–Social Democratic Party of Serbia	1,322	6.49		
Aleksandar Odžić	U-Turn	980	4.81		
Slobodan Maraš	United Regions of Serbia	869	4.27		
Novak Vukoje	Social Democratic Alliance	576	2.83		
Jovan Mihajilo	Serb Democratic Party	387	1.90		
Total valid votes		20,365	100	15,512	100
