= Marko Maksimović =

Marko Maksimović may refer to:

- Marko Maksimović (footballer) (born 1984), Bosnian football manager
- Marko Maksimović (politician) (born 1947), Serbian politician
- Marko Maksimović (tennis) (born 2006), Serbian tennis player
