= Mirčić =

Mirčić is a surname. Notable people with the surname include:

- Milorad Mirčić (1956–2025), Serbian politician
- Teodora Mirčić (born 1988), Serbian tennis player
