= Vučeta Tošković =

Serbian politician

Vučeta Tošković (Serbian Cyrillic: Вучета Тошковић; born 24 March 1941) is a politician in Serbia. He has served several terms in the National Assembly of Serbia and was a member of the Assembly of Vojvodina from 2016 to 2020. Originally a member of the far-right Serbian Radical Party, Tošković has been a member of the Serbian Progressive Party since its formation in 2008.

== Private career ==
Tošković was a traffic engineer his private career. He is now retired and lives in Novi Sad.

== Politician ==
=== Member of the National Assembly ===
==== Radical Party ====
Tošković joined the Serbian Radical Party in 1992. He ran for the national assembly in the 1992 Serbian parliamentary election, appearing in the seventeenth position on the Radical Party's electoral list in Novi Sad. The party won ten mandates in the division, and Tošković was not included in its assembly delegation. (From 1992 to 2000, Serbia's electoral law stipulated that one-third of parliamentary mandates would be assigned to candidates from successful lists in numerical order, while the remaining two-thirds would be distributed amongst other candidates on the lists by the sponsoring parties. It was common practice for the latter mandates to be assigned out of numerical order. Tošković could have been awarded a mandate despite his low list position, but he was not.)

He received the seventh position on the Radical Party's list for the smaller, redistributed Novi Sad division in the 1997 parliamentary election. The party won three mandates in the division, and he was again not initially included in its delegation. Due to a quirk in the Serbian electoral system, the Radical Party gained an extra Novi Sad seat in 1999 after the resignation of a delegate from another party. Tošković was chosen to receive the new mandate and formally entered the assembly on 4 February 1999. The Radical Party was part of Serbia's coalition government during this period, and Tošković served as a government supporter in the assembly until the fall of Slobodan Milošević in October 2000. A new transitional government was formed after this time, and the Radicals moved into opposition.

Serbia's electoral system was reformed for the 2000 parliamentary election, with the entire country becoming a single constituency. Tošković received the fifty-eighth position on the Radical list. The list won twenty-three mandates, and he was not selected for a new mandate. (As a result of the 2000 electoral reform, all Serbian parliamentary mandates were awarded to sponsoring parties or coalitions rather than to individual candidates. As before, it was common practice for the mandates to be assigned out of numerical order. Tošković's position on the list had no formal bearing on his chances for election.)

Tošković was given the 160th position on the Radical list in the 2003 parliamentary election. On this occasion, the Radicals won eighty-two mandates; Tošković was not initially included in the party's delegation but received a mandate on 17 February 2004 as the replacement for another member who had been appointed to the Assembly of Serbia and Montenegro. While the Radicals won more seats than any other party in 2003, they fell well short of a majority and ultimately served in opposition.

In late 2004, the Radicals formed a new municipal government in Novi Sad. While still serving in the national assembly, Tošković was appointed to the Novi Sad council (i.e., the executive branch of the city government) with responsibility for traffic. He was also a member of the management board of the JGSP Novi Sad and oversaw the city's headquarters for flood defence during the 2006 European floods.

Tošković appeared on the Radical Party's lists in the 2007 and 2008 Serbian parliamentary elections and received a mandate on both occasions. The party remained in opposition during this period.

==== Progressive Party ====
The Radical Party experienced a serious split in late 2008, with several members joining the more moderate Progressive Party under the leadership of Tomislav Nikolić and Aleksandar Vučić. Tošković sided with the Progressives.

Serbia's electoral system was reformed again in 2011, such that mandates were awarded to candidates on successful lists in numerical order. Tošković was given the fifty-third position on the Progressive Party's Let's Get Serbia Moving list in the 2012 parliamentary election and was elected to a fifth term when the list won seventy-three mandates. The Progressives formed a coalition government with the Socialist Party of Serbia and other parties after the election, and Tošković served as part of its parliamentary majority. He was promoted to the thirty-fourth position on the Progressive list in the 2014 parliamentary election and was again elected when the list won a majority victory with 158 out of 250 mandates. During the 2014–16 parliament, he was a member of the assembly committee on spatial planning, transport, infrastructure, and telecommunications; and deputy member of the committee on justice, state administration, and local self-government; and a member of the parliamentary friendship groups with Cuba, Israel, Montenegro, and the United Arab Emirates. He did not seek re-election at the republic level in 2016.

=== Provincial politics ===
Tošković sought election to the Vojvodina provincial assembly in the 1996 but was not returned. He ran again in the 2004 and 2008 elections and on both occasions finished second in a Novi Sad constituency seat.

Vojvodina switched to a system of full proportional representation for the 2016 provincial election. Tošković was given the twenty-third position on the Progressive Party's list and was elected when the list won a majority victory with sixty-three out of 120 mandates. As the oldest member of the new assembly, he chaired its first meeting prior to the formal selection of a speaker. He served as a government supporter in the assembly for the next four years and did not seek re-election in 2020.

== Electoral record ==
=== Provincial (Vojvodina) ===
2008 Vojvodina assembly election Novi Sad VII (constituency seat) - First and Second Rounds
Candidate	Party or Coalition	Votes	%	Votes	%
Srboljub Bubnjević	For a European Vojvodina: Democratic Party–G17 Plus, Boris Tadić (Affiliation: Democratic Party)	4,435	21.50	6,188	51.18
Vučeta Tošković	Serbian Radical Party	5,669	27.49	5,903	48.82
Branko Bošković	Citizens' Group: Maja Gojković	2,672	12.96		
Petar Viđikant	Socialist Party of Serbia–Party of United Pensioners of Serbia	2,460	11.93		
Paja Dobanovački	Coalition: Together for Vojvodina - Nenad Čanak	2,171	10.53		
Milanko Grbić	Democratic Party of Serbia–New Serbia	1,636	7.93		
Milan Paroški	People's Movement for Vojvodina	1,581	7.67		
Total valid votes		20,624	100	12,091	100
Invalid ballots		1,088		290	
Total votes casts		21,712		12,381	32.60

2004 Vojvodina assembly election Novi Sad II (constituency seat) - First and Second Rounds
Candidate	Party or Coalition	Votes	%	Votes	%
Dušan Elezović	Democratic Party	4,092	29.09	10,551	63.61
Vučeta Tošković	Serbian Radical Party	3,183	22.62	6,035	36.39
Dragoslav Gavrančić	Coalition: Together for Vojvodina - Nenad Čanak	2,316	16.46		
Miodrag Dimitrijević	Democratic Party of Serbia	1,784	12.68		
Jadranka Bjelica	Socialist Party of Serbia	1,047	7.44		
Gojko Vujnović	Strength of Serbia Movement	946	6.72		
Ratimir Svirčević	Clean Hands of Vojvodina – Serbian Renewal Movement–Reformists of Vojvodina–OPOR	701	4.98		
Total valid votes		14,069	100	16,586	100
Invalid ballots		582		470	
Total votes casts		14,651	38.91	17,056	45.29
