= List of mayors of Zrenjanin =

Mayor of Zrenjanin
- Coat of arms of Zrenjanin
- Incumbent; Simo Salapura since 18 September 2020
- Style: Mayor
- Member of: City Council
- Reports to: City Assembly
- Residence: No official residence
- Seat: Zrenjanin City Hall
- Term length: 4 years
- Inaugural holder: Mihalj Štefulić
- Formation: 1872

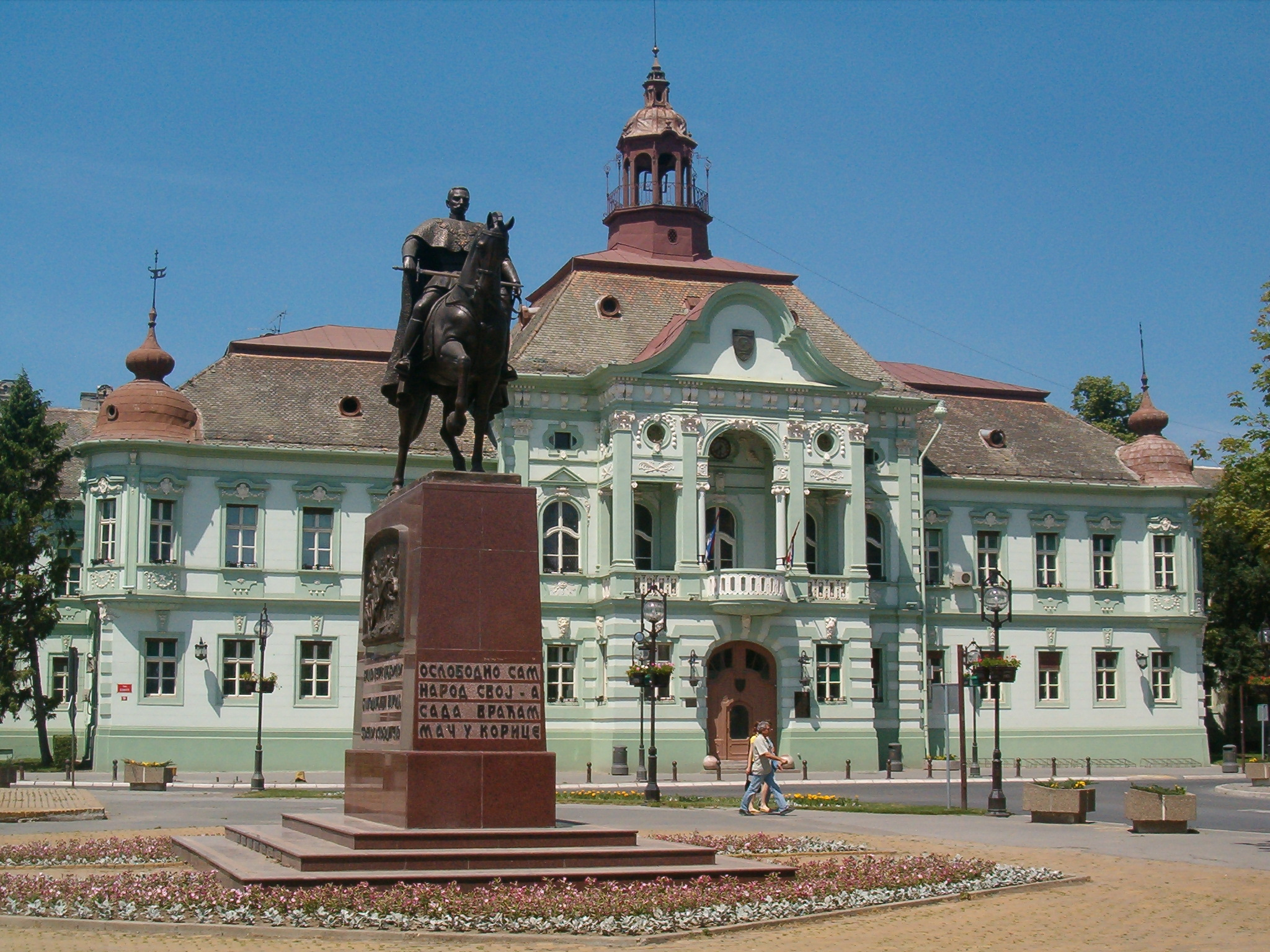
Zrenjanin City Hall - Office of the mayor.

This is a list of mayors of Zrenjanin since 1872.

The mayor of Zrenjanin is the head of the City of Zrenjanin (the sixth largest city in Serbia and third largest city in the Autonomous Province of Vojvodina). He acts on behalf of the City, and performs an executive function in the City of Zrenjanin. The current mayor of Zrenjanin is Simo Salapura (SNS).

== Austria-Hungary ==
- Mihály Stefulics (1872 – 1874)
- Lájos Kulifay (1874 – 1888)
- Jovan Krstić (1888 – 1896)
- József Grandjean (1896 – 1902)
- Zoltán Perišić (1902 – 1918)

== Kingdom of Serbs, Croats and Slovenes / Kingdom of Yugoslavia ==
- Jovan Miljković (1918 – 1919)
- Ivan Mirkov (1919)
- Živan Jankahidac (1919 – 1920)
- Đurica Berberski (1920 – 1921)
- Bogoljub Aleksić (1921 – 1924)
- Đurica Berberski (1924)
- Bogoljub Aleksić (1924 – 1928)
- Jovan Stajić (1928)
- Nikola Stefanović (1929 – 1931)
- Miloš Stefanović (1931 – 1935)
- Đurica Berberski (1935)
- Milorad Vladiv (1935 – 1936)
- Vladimir Živković (1936 – 1939)
- Milorad Cvetkov (1939 – 1940)
- Pera Erdeljanov (1940 – 1941)

== Nazi German occupation ==
- Josef Gion (1941 – 1944)

== DF Yugoslavia / FPR Yugoslavia / SFR Yugoslavia ==
- Đorđe Marinković (1944)
- Svetozar Ružić (1944 – 1945)
- Slavko Kirćanski (1945 – 1948)
- Vladeta Savić (1948 – 1949)
- Dragoljub Kirćanski (1949 – 1950)
- Svetislav Ješić (1950 – 1955)
- Dragoljub Kirćanski (1955 – 1959)
- Milorad Birovljev (1959 – 1962)
- Vojin Arsenov (1962 – 1967)
- Ljubomir Pajić (1967 – 1970)
- Dušan Radaković (1971 – 1974)
- Mirko Čelar (1974 – 1979)
- Miroljub Gećin (1979 – 1982)
- Milorad Milisavljević (1982 – 1983)
- Milan Bubreško (1983 – 1984)
- Milan Vujin (1984 – 1985)
- Bogdana Glumac-Levakov (1985 – 1986)
- Borislav Odadžić (1986 – 1987)
- Milan Milošev (1988)
- Đorđe Mavrenski (1989)

== FR Yugoslavia / Serbia and Montenegro ==
No.	Portrait	Name (Birth–Death)	Term of Office		Party
37		Svetislav Krstić (born 1955)	1989	1992	Socialist Party of Serbia
38		Ljubo Slijepčević (born 1949)	1992	1996	Socialist Party of Serbia
39		Zlatomir Kozlovački (born 1948)	1996	1998	Democratic Party
40		Ivan Francuski	1998	2000	Socialist Party of Serbia
41		Milan Čežek (1955–2022)	2000	3 October 2004	League of Social Democrats of Vojvodina
42		Goran Knežević (born 1957)	3 October 2004	5 June 2006	Democratic Party

== Republic of Serbia ==
No.	Portrait	Name (Birth–Death)	Term of Office		Party
42		Goran Knežević (born 1957)	5 June 2006	23 April 2009	Democratic Party
43		Mileta Mihajlov (born 1956)	23 April 2009	6 July 2012	Democratic Party
(42)		Goran Knežević (born 1957)	6 July 2012	21 August 2012	Serbian Progressive Party
44		Ivan Bošnjak (born 1974)	21 August 2012	12 June 2014	Serbian Progressive Party
45		Čedomir Janjić (born 1972)	12 June 2014	21 August 2020	Serbian Progressive Party
46		Simo Salapura (born 1980)	18 September 2020	Incumbent	Serbian Progressive Party

== See also ==
- Zrenjanin
