= Đuro Bajić =

Serbian politician

Đuro Bajić (Serbian Cyrillic: Ђуро Бајић; born 5 May 1938) is a former politician in Serbia. He was the mayor of Novi Sad from 1995 to 1996, serving as a member of the Socialist Party of Serbia (Socijalistička partija Srbije, SPS).

== Early life and career ==
Bajić was born in Mokronoge, in what was then the Vrbas Banovina of the Kingdom of Yugoslavia. He worked at different times as an electro-mechanic for cooling devices and an engineer for work organization.

== Politician ==
Bajić was elected to the Novi Sad city assembly in the December 1992 Serbian local elections. In the immediate aftermath of the city election, Milorad Mirčić of the Serbian Radical Party (Srpska radikalna stranka, SRS) was chosen as president of the assembly (a position that was at the time equivalent to mayor) with the support of the Socialists. The SPS later withdrew its support from the Radicals, and on 10 January 1995 the assembly selected Bajić as the city's new mayor. One of his main responsibilities was dealing with the needs of Serb refugees from Croatia and Bosnia and Herzegovina, who had arrived in Novi Sad during and after the Yugoslav Wars of the 1990s. Bajić also signed a twinning relationship between Novi Sad and Budva, Montenegro, in 1996.

The SPS was defeated by the Zajedno coalition in the 1996 Serbian local elections, and Bajić stood down as mayor later in the year. After leaving office, he became a coordinator for technical issues at JP "Poslovni prostor".
