= Miloš Tubić =

Serbian politician

Miloš Tubić (Serbian Cyrillic: Милош Тубић; born 1975) is a politician in Serbia. He has led the Vojvodina provincial board of the Democratic Party of Serbia (Demokratska stranka Srbije, DSS) since 2019 and has been a member of the Assembly of Vojvodina since 2020.

== Private career ==
Tubić holds an electrical engineering degree and lives in Novi Sad.

== Politician ==
=== Provincial politician ===
Tubić sought election to the Vojvodina assembly in the 2012 provincial election, running in Novi Sad's sixth constituency seat. He was defeated. Vojvodina subsequently switched to a system of full proportional representation. The DSS contested the 2016 provincial election in an alliance with Dveri, and Tubić received the largely ceremonial 119th position (out of 120) on their combined list. The list did not cross the electoral threshold to win representation in the assembly.

The DSS established a new provincial board in 2019, and Tubić was chosen as the board's president. As of 2021, he is also a member of the party's executive board at the republic level.

The DSS led the METLA 2020 alliance in the 2020 provincial election; Tubić received the second position on the alliance's list and was elected when the list won five mandates. The Serbian Progressive Party and its allies won a majority government, and the DSS serves in opposition. Tubić is now a member of the assembly committee on administrative and mandatory issues.

In November 2020, Tubić took part in a meeting of opposition party leaders with the editor-in-chief of Radio Television of Vojvodina, seeking to increase and improve the presence of opposition parties in the station's programming.

=== City and republic-level candidacies ===
Tubić received the seventh position on the DSS list for Novi Sad in the 2012 Serbian local elections and missed election when the list won five mandates. He was appointed as director of the public company Tržnica in September 2012, after the establishment of a new coalition government in the city supported by the DSS.

He received the sixteenth position on the DSS–Dveri list in the 2016 local elections; the list did not cross the threshold to win representation in the city assembly. He later received the twenty-fifth position out of twenty-six on the METLA 2020 list in the 2020 local elections and was not elected when the list won three mandates.

Tubić was also included in the twenty-sixth spot on the METLA 2020 list in the 2020 Serbian parliamentary election. The list did not win any mandates.

== Electoral record ==
=== Provincial (Vojvodina) ===
2012 Vojvodina provincial election: Novi Sad Division 6
Candidate	Party	First round		Second round	
Candidate	Party	Votes	%	Votes	%
Goran Paunović	"Choice for a Better Vojvodina–Bojan Pajtić" (Affiliation: Democratic Party)	5,236	19.68	12,180	54.30
Svetislav Krstić	Let's Get Vojvodina Moving–Tomislav Nikolić (Serbian Progressive Party, New Serbia, Movement of Socialists, Strength of Serbia Movement) (Affiliation: Serbian Progressive Party)	5,767	21.68	10,251	45.70
Maja Timotijević	League of Social Democrats of Vojvodina–Nenad Čanak	4,324	16.25		
Blažo Vujović	"Ivica Dačić–Socialist Party of Serbia (SPS)–Party of United Pensioners of Serbia (PUPS)–United Serbia (JS)–Social Democratic Party of Serbia (SDP Serbia)" (Affiliation: Socialist Party of Serbia)	3,389	12.74		
Miloš Tubić	Democratic Party of Serbia	2,527	9.50		
Snežana Mušicki	Serbian Radical Party	2,158	8.11		
Jovan Ćirić	U-Turn	1,633	6.14		
Siniša Kovačević	Maja Gojković–United Regions of Serbia	1,572	5.91		
Total		26,606	100.00	22,431	100.00
