= Zoran Subotić =

Serbian politician

Zoran Subotić (Serbian Cyrillic: Зоран Суботић; born 27 April 1958) is a Serbian politician and former military figure. He has held a number of governmental roles throughout his career, including member of the National Assembly of Serbia (1993–97), deputy minister in the Government of Serbia (1998–2000), and member of the Assembly of Vojvodina (2016–20). He now serves in the Novi Sad city assembly and is deputy leader of the Victory for Novi Sad–Russian Party caucus.

== Private career ==
Subotić was born in Benkovac, in what was then the People's Republic of Croatia in the Federal People's Republic of Yugoslavia. He trained as an agricultural engineer.

== Military activities ==
During the early 1990s, Subotić was a commander in the Yugoslav People's Army (Jugoslovenska narodna armija, JNA) and subsequently in the Territorial Defence Force of the Republic of Bosnia and Herzegovina. He was briefly stationed in Zvornik, Bosnia and Herzegovina, in the early period of the Bosnian War. Several other Serb commanders in Zvornik were subsequently charged with war crimes; Subotić was not. In 2007, he appeared as a witness at the trial of the "Zvornik Group" by the War Crimes Chamber in Belgrade.

Subotić's name was also mentioned in the trial of Vojislav Šešelj at the International Criminal Tribunal for the Former Yugoslavia (ICTY). On one occasion, Šešelj made reference to a statement given to the ICTY by Subotić, in which the latter indicated that he had only been present in Zvornik as a commander for a period of a week to ten days. Šešelj also stated that Subotić had left the area prior to the expulsion of the Bosniak population and was not implicated in it.

In 2007, Subotić stated that ICTY prosecution witnesses had attempted to influence him to make false statements against Šešelj.

== Politician ==
=== Radical Party ===
Subotić entered political life as a member of Šešelj's far-right Serbian Radical Party. He appeared in the third position on the party's electoral list for the Užice division in the 1992 Serbian parliamentary election (as a resident of Loznica) and was elected when the party won eight mandates in the division. (From 1992 to 2000, Serbia's electoral law stipulated that one-third of parliamentary mandates would be assigned to candidates from successful lists in numerical order, while the remaining two-thirds would be distributed amongst other candidates on the lists by the sponsoring parties.) The assembly convened in early 1993. The governing Socialist Party of Serbia won the largest number of seats, but with 101 mandates out of 250 fell short of a majority. The Radicals finished in second place with seventy-three seats. Although the Radicals were technically an opposition, they initially worked with the Socialists in an informal coalition. By late 1993, however, the two parties had turned against each other and new elections were called.

Subotić was promoted to the second position on the party's list in Užice in the 1993 parliamentary election and was re-elected when the list won four mandates in the division. The Socialists won a clearer victory in this election, while the Radicals fell to thirty-nine seats and served in opposition for the next four years. Subotić was not a candidate for re-election in the 1997 election. He subsequently relocated to Novi Sad in the province of Vojvodina.

From 1998 to 2000, the Radical Party participated in a coalition government with the Socialist Party. During this time, Subotić served as deputy minister of labour, employment, veterans' affairs, and social policy. In February 2020, he was placed under sanctions by the European Union. He left office after the fall of Slobodan Milošević's government in October 2000.

Subotić was a candidate for the Assembly of Vojvodina in the 2000 provincial election (which was held in September and October), running in Novi Sad's tenth division. He was defeated by Gordana Čomić of the Democratic Party. He also ran for election to Novi Sad's city assembly in the concurrent 2000 Serbian local elections. He was not successful; the Radical Party fared very poorly in this election, failing to win an even single mandate.

After the fall of Milošević, a new Serbian parliamentary election was held in December 2000. For this election, the entire country was designated as a single electoral division, and all mandates were awarded at the discretion of successful parties and coalitions, irrespective of the numerical order of the listed candidates. Subotić appeared in the fifty-second position on the Radical Party's list. The list won twenty-three mandates, and he was not chosen as part of his party's delegation. He subsequently left the Radical Party.

=== After 2000 ===
Subotić again sought election to the Vojvodina assembly in 2004, running in Novi Sad's seventh division as a candidate of a citizens' group called "Community of Serbs of Croatia and Bosnia and Herzegovina." He finished in last place; the winner was Milorad Mirčić of the Radical Party.

Subotić later joined the Serb Democratic Party, a Serbian political organization with ties to the Serb communities in Croatia and Bosnia and Herzegovina. He was the party's co-ordinator for Vojvodina in 2016. The party contested the 2016 Vojvodina provincial election as part of the electoral alliance around the Serbian Progressive Party; Subotić was given the sixtieth position on the Progressive-led list and was elected when the list won a majority victory with sixty-three out of 120 mandates. He was a member of the assembly committee on the organization of administration and local self-government. During this time, he was also the Vojvodina president of a group called the Community of Serbs. The Serb Democratic Party appears to have at least become dormant during this time and may have ceased to exist entirely. He was not a candidate for re-election at the provincial level in 2020.

He sought election to the Novi Sad city assembly in the 2020 Serbian local elections in the first position on the Serbian Patriotic Alliance's Victory for Novi Sad list and was elected when the list won three mandates. He is now the vice-president of a caucus that includes Victory for Novi Sad and the Russian Party, which won one seat in the election.

== Electoral record ==
=== Provincial (Vojvodina) ===
2004 Vojvodina assembly election Novi Sad VII (constituency seat) - First and Second Rounds
Candidate	Party or Coalition	Votes	%	Votes	%
Milorad Mirčić	Serbian Radical Party	5,012	44.08	8,993	67.49
Miloš Račić	Democratic Party	1,935	17.02	4,331	32.51
Miroslav Kopanja	Socialist Party of Serbia	1,629	14.33		
Milan Paroški	New Serbia	1,337	11.76		
Mirko Šipovac	Democratic Party of Serbia	582	5.12		
Milorad Rajić	Clean Hands of Vojvodina	574	5.05		
Zoran Subotić	Citizen's Group – Community of Serbs of Croatia and Bosnia and Herzegovina	300	2.64		
Total valid votes		11,369	100	13,324	100
Invalid ballots		511		506	
Total votes casts		11,880	34.30	13,830	39.92
