= Mirko Cvjetićanin =

Serbian politician

Mirko Cvjetićanin (Serbian Cyrillic: Мирко Цвјетићанин; born 1942 or 1943) was a Serbian politician in the early 1990s. He served in the Vojvodina provincial assembly from 1992 to 1993 as a member of the Socialist Party of Serbia (SPS).

== Private career ==
Cvjetićanin was described in 1992 as a graduated agricultural engineer. He was forty-nine years old and lived in the Novi Sad community of Petrovaradin.

== Politician ==
Cvjetićanin was elected to the Vojvodina legislature for Novi Sad's fourth division in the May 1992 provincial election. The Socialist Party won a landslide majority victory in the election, due in part to a boycott by Serbia's leading democratic opposition parties, and he served as a government supporter.

Due to ongoing doubts about the legitimacy of the May elections, Vojvodina held a new provincial election in December 1992. Cvjetićanin was defeated in his bid for re-election as the Socialists won a significantly reduced victory overall. His term ended when the new assembly convened in early 1993.

== Electoral record ==
=== Provincial (Vojvodina) ===
December 1992 Vojvodina provincial election: Novi Sad Division 4
Candidate	Party	Votes	%
Olgica Radić	Democratic Party–Reformist Democratic Party of Vojvodina–Democratic Movement of Serbia (Affiliation: Democratic Party)		elected
Mirko Cvjetićanin (incumbent)	Socialist Party of Serbia		
Siniša Petković	Serb Democratic Party		
Marijan Sabljak	League of Social Democrats of Vojvodina		
Vesna Živanov	Serbian Radical Party		
Total			
Source: All candidates except Radić are listed alphabetically.

May 1992 Vojvodina provincial election: Novi Sad Division 4
Candidate	Party	Votes	%
Mirko Cvjetićanin	Socialist Party of Serbia		elected in the second round
Milorad Mirčić	Serbian Radical Party		defeated in the second round
Siniša Šuša	Serb Democratic Party–People's Party		
Total			
