= Svetozar Sečen =

Svetozar Sečen (Serbian Cyrillic: Светозар Сечен) is a Serbian medical doctor and former politician. He was a member of the Vojvodina provincial assembly from 1993 to 1997. During his time as an elected official, he was a member of the Serbian Renewal Movement (SPO).

== Private career ==
Sečen is a medical doctor with specialization in general surgery. He worked at the Clinical Center of Vojvodina and became a full professor at the University of Novi Sad in 2011.

In 2007, Sečen was appointed by the Vojvodina government to a four-year term on the board of directors of the Clinical Center of Vojvodina.

== Politician ==
In 1992, the Serbian Renewal Movement became the dominant party in a broader political coalition called the Democratic Movement of Serbia (DEPOS). DEPOS, in turn, mostly contested the December 1992 Vojvodina provincial election in an alliance with the Democratic Party (DS) and the Reformist Democratic Party of Vojvodina (RDSV). Sečen ran as the alliance's candidate in Novi Sad's eighth division and was elected, taking his seat when the assembly convened in early 1993. The governing Socialist Party of Serbia (SPS) won a plurality victory with fifty seats out of 120, while the democratic opposition parties won a combined total of forty seats. Although its hold on power was never entirely secure, the SPS remained in office of the full term of the assembly, and Sečen served as an opposition delegate.

In November 1994, Sečen delivered a lecture entitled "Medical Chambers" at the SPO's offices in Novi Sad.

The DEPOS coalition dissolved in 1994, and the SPO joined a new coalition called Zajedno (Together) in 1996. Sečen ran for re-election to the Vojvodina assembly in Novi Sad's seventh division as a Zajedno candidate and was defeated in the second round of voting. His term ended when the new assembly met in early 1997.

Sečen also appeared in the fourth position (out of four) on the Zajedno coalition's electoral list in the Novi Sad division for the Yugoslavian parliament's Chamber of Citizens in the 1996 Yugoslavian parliamentary election, which took place concurrently with the provincial vote. The list won one seat in the division, which was automatically assigned to its lead candidate, Predrag Filipov of the Democratic Party.

== Electoral record ==
=== Provincial (Vojvodina) ===
1996 Vojvodina provincial election: Novi Sad Division 7 (Second Round)
Candidate	Party	Votes	%
Svetislav Krstić	Socialist Party of Serbia		elected
Milorad Mirčić	Serbian Radical Party		
Dr. Svetozar Sečen (incumbent for Novi Sad Division 8)	Zajedno (Coalition Together) (Affiliation: Serbian Renewal Movement)		
Total			
Source: Mirčić and Sečen are listed alphabetically. Mirčić finished first in the first round of voting.

December 1992 Vojvodina provincial election: Novi Sad Division 8
Candidate	Party	Votes	%
Svetozar Sečen	Democratic Movement of Serbia–Reformist Democratic Party of Vojvodina–Democratic Party (Affiliation: Democratic Movement of Serbia, Serbian Renewal Movement)		elected
Dušanka Mandić	Serbian Radical Party		
Stojan Savić (incumbent)	Socialist Party of Serbia		
Dragoljub Zbiljić	Serb Democratic Party		
Total			
Source: All candidates except Sečen are listed alphabetically.
