= Milorad Đurđević =

Serbian politician

Milorad Đurđević (Serbian Cyrillic: Милорад Ђурђевић; born 10 August 1940) is a former politician in Serbia. He was the interim mayor of Novi Sad from 1994 to 1995, serving as a member of the Socialist Party of Serbia (Socijalistička partija Srbije, SPS).

== Early life and private career ==
Đurđević was born in Gornje Vodičevo, in what was then the Vrbas Banovina of the Kingdom of Yugoslavia. He graduated from the High School of Electrical Engineering in Sarajevo in 1958 and the Higher Pedagogical School of Electrical Engineering in Rijeka in 1963, earning a second degree from the same institution in 1973. Đurđević himself became the director of a high school of electrical engineering in 1976 and was secretary of the community vocational schools of Vojvodina from 1976 to 2000.

== Politician ==
Đurđević was elected to Novi Sad city assembly in the December 1992 Serbian local elections and afterwards served the assembly's vice-president (i.e., deputy mayor). He was the interim mayor from 24 June 1994 to 10 January 1995, following the departure of the incumbent mayor Milorad Mirčić.
