= Ljubo Slijepčević =

Serbian politician

Ljubo Slijepčević (Serbian Cyrillic: Љубо Слијепчевић; born 1949) is a Serbian former politician. He has served in the Yugoslavian and Serbian parliaments and was the mayor of Zrenjanin from 1992 to 1996. During his time as an elected official, Slijepčević was a member of the Socialist Party of Serbia (SPS).

== Private career ==
Slijepčević has a degree in sociology. Before entering political life, he was a high-school teacher in Zrenjanin.

== Politician ==
=== Mayor of Zrenjanin (1992–96) ===
Slijepčević was elected to the Zrenjanin city assembly in the May 1992 Serbian local elections. The Socialists won a majority in the city with fifty-four out of seventy seats, due in part to a boycott by many of Serbia's leading opposition parties. When the assembly convened on 25 June 1992, he was chosen as its president, a position that was then equivalent to mayor.

Due to ongoing doubts about the legitimacy of the May 1992 elections, the Serbian government called new local elections for December 1992. Slijepčević was re-elected to the Zrenjanin assembly; the Socialists won a somewhat reduced majority victory in the city with forty-six seats, and he was confirmed for a second term as mayor on 15 January 1993. He served for the full term that followed.

In the 1996 Serbian local elections, the combined forces of the opposition won a narrow majority in the Zrenjanin assembly. After the elections, Serbia's governing SPS authorities initially refused to recognize the opposition's victories in several major cities, leading to an extended period of public protests. In Zrenjanin, there was a brief period where the city had two rival governments, respectively led by Slijepčević and Zajedno nominee Zlatomir Kozlovački. The opposition constituted itself as the legitimate government in late December 1996, however, and in early January the Hungarian language newspaper Magyar Szó reported that Slijepčević had acknowledged the opposition's victory.

=== Politics at the republican level ===
Slijepčević appeared in the third position on the Socialist Party's electoral list for the Zrenjanin division in the 1992 Serbian parliamentary election, which took place concurrently with the December 1992 local elections, and received a mandate when the list won eight seats. (From 1992 to 2000, Serbia's electoral law stipulated that one-third of parliamentary mandates would be assigned to candidates from successful lists in numerical order, while the remaining two-thirds would be distributed amongst other candidates at the discretion of the sponsoring parties. Slijepčević was automatically elected by virtue of his list position.) He took his seat when the assembly met in January 1993 and served as a member of the foreign affairs committee.

The Socialist Party won most seats in the 1992 parliamentary election but fell short of a majority and initially governed in an informal alliance with the far-right Serbian Radical Party (SRS). The alliance broke down in mid-1993, and a new parliamentary election was called for December of that year. Slijepčević was not a candidate, and his term ended when the new assembly met in early 1994.

=== Politics at the federal level ===
Slijepčević ran for the Yugoslavian parliament's Chamber of Citizens in the 1996 federal election, appearing in the fourth position out of five in the Zrenjanin division on a coalition electoral list of the Socialist Party, the Yugoslav Left (JUL), and New Democracy (ND). The list won two out of five available seats, and he was awarded the coalition's "optional" mandate for the division. (Note: Available online sources do not clarify if Slijepčević received a mandate at the beginning of the parliamentary term or if he was given a replacement mandate at a later time. The former scenario is more probable.) The Socialist coalition and its Montenegrin allies won a majority victory, and he served as a government supporter. He was also the coordinator for Serbia's Central Banat District during this time.

During the 1990s, the political landscape of Serbia and Yugoslavia was dominated by the authoritarian rule of SPS leader Slobodan Milošević and his allies. Milošević was defeated by Democratic Opposition of Serbia (DOS) candidate Vojislav Koštunica in the 2000 Yugoslavian presidential election and subsequently fell from power after popular protests.

In the 2000 Yugoslavian parliamentary election, which took place concurrently with the presidential vote, Slijepčević appeared in the second position on a coalition SPS–JUL list in Zrenjanin. The coalition again won two seats in the division. For this election, one-half of the assembly mandates were awarded to candidates on successful lists in numerical order and the other half at the discretion of the sponsoring parties or coalitions; Slijepčević either did not receive a mandate or, if he did, resigned his seat soon after the election.

== Since 2000 ==
Slijepčević resigned from all positions in the Socialist Party in late 2000, citing "disappointed hopes."

In a 2016 interview, Slijepčević described unemployment as the greatest problem facing Zrenjanin and regretted that the city was not more attractive to domestic investors.
