= Aleksandar Jovanović (politician) =

Serbian politician (born 1976)

Aleksandar Jovanović (Serbian Cyrillic: Александар Јовановић; born 1976) is a politician in Serbia. He has served in the Assembly of Vojvodina since 2016 as a member of the League of Social Democrats of Vojvodina (LSV).

== Early life and career ==
Jovanović was born in Novi Sad, Vojvodina, in what was then the Socialist Republic of Serbia in the Socialist Federal Republic of Yugoslavia. He lived in Kuwait from 1987 with 1990 when his father, a medical doctor, was stationed in the country. The family returned to Novi Sad following Iraq's 1990 invasion of Kuwait. Jovanović holds a master's degree in Sociology from the University of Novi Sad. In addition to his life in politics, he has worked occasionally as a live DJ since the 1990s under the name DJ Skadam and operates a café called Novosađanin.

== Political career ==
Jovanović first became active with the LSV as a youth, from 1991 to 1994. He became politically re-engaged in 1996, taking part in a committee that organized protests against the rule of Slobodan Milošević and his allies. Jovanović was elected to the Novi Sad city assembly in the 2000 Serbian local elections, became the leader of the LSV assembly group shortly thereafter, and was re-elected in 2004 and 2008. He was chosen as leader of the LSV organization in Novi Sad in February 2008 and became president (i.e., speaker) of the Novi Sad city assembly in June of the same year, after a coalition of parties including the LSV formed a majority on the city council. He held the latter position until 2012. In December 2012, he was elected as a member of the LSV presidency.

Jovanović has warned of the rise of fascism in Serbia, opposing the presence of far-right "patriotic" organizations in public life. In 2017, he joined with party leader Nenad Čanak in opposing a monument to Slobodan Milošević in Belgrade.

=== Assembly of Vojvodina ===
Jovanović first sought election to the Vojvodina assembly in the 2012 provincial election. He was defeated in Novi Sad's third division in the second round of voting.

For the 2016 provincial election, Vojvodina switched to a system in which all seats were determined by proportional representation. Jovanović received the seventh position on the LSV's electoral list and was elected when the list won nine mandates. The Serbian Progressive Party and its allies won a majority government in this election, and the LSV now sits in opposition. Jovanović serves on the assembly's education and science committee and the committee on cooperation with committees of the National Assembly of Serbia in respect to the competencies of the province.

=== Elections for the National Assembly of Serbia ===
Jovanović has been a candidate for election to the National Assembly on four occasions. He appeared on the list of the LSV's Together for Tolerance coalition in the 2003 election; the list did not cross the electoral threshold to win representation in the assembly. The LSV contested the 2012 Serbian election on the Choice for a Better Life list led by the Democratic Party. Jovanović received the 165th position on the list and was not returned when it won sixty-seven mandates. The Democratic Party subsequently experienced a serious split, and former leader Boris Tadić created a new breakaway group that became known as the Social Democratic Party. The LSV aligned itself with Tadić in both the 2014 and 2016 elections; Jovanović appeared as an LSV candidate both times, but in too low a position to be elected.

== Electoral record ==
=== Provincial (Vojvodina) ===
2012 Vojvodina assembly election Novi Sad III (constituency seat) - First and Second Rounds
Veljko Krstonošić	Choice for a Better Vojvodina	4,055	19.91	8,596	55.42
Aleksandar Jovanović	League of Social Democrats of Vojvodina	4,229	20.77	6,916	44.58
Milan Novaković	Let's Get Vojvodina Moving (Affiliation: Serbian Progressive Party)	3,415	16.77		
Borko Ilić	Democratic Party of Serbia	3,033	14.89		
Vanja Božić	Serbian Radical Party	1,499	7.36		
Ratko Striković	Socialist Party of Serbia–Party of United Pensioners of Serbia–United Serbia–Social Democratic Party of Serbia	1,322	6.49		
Aleksandar Odžić	U-Turn	980	4.81		
Slobodan Maraš	United Regions of Serbia	869	4.27		
Novak Vukoje	Social Democratic Alliance	576	2.83		
Jovan Mihajilo	Serb Democratic Party	387	1.90		
Total valid votes		20,365	100	15,512	100
