= Ivan Bošnjak (politician) =

Serbian politician (born 1974)

- Иван Бошњак
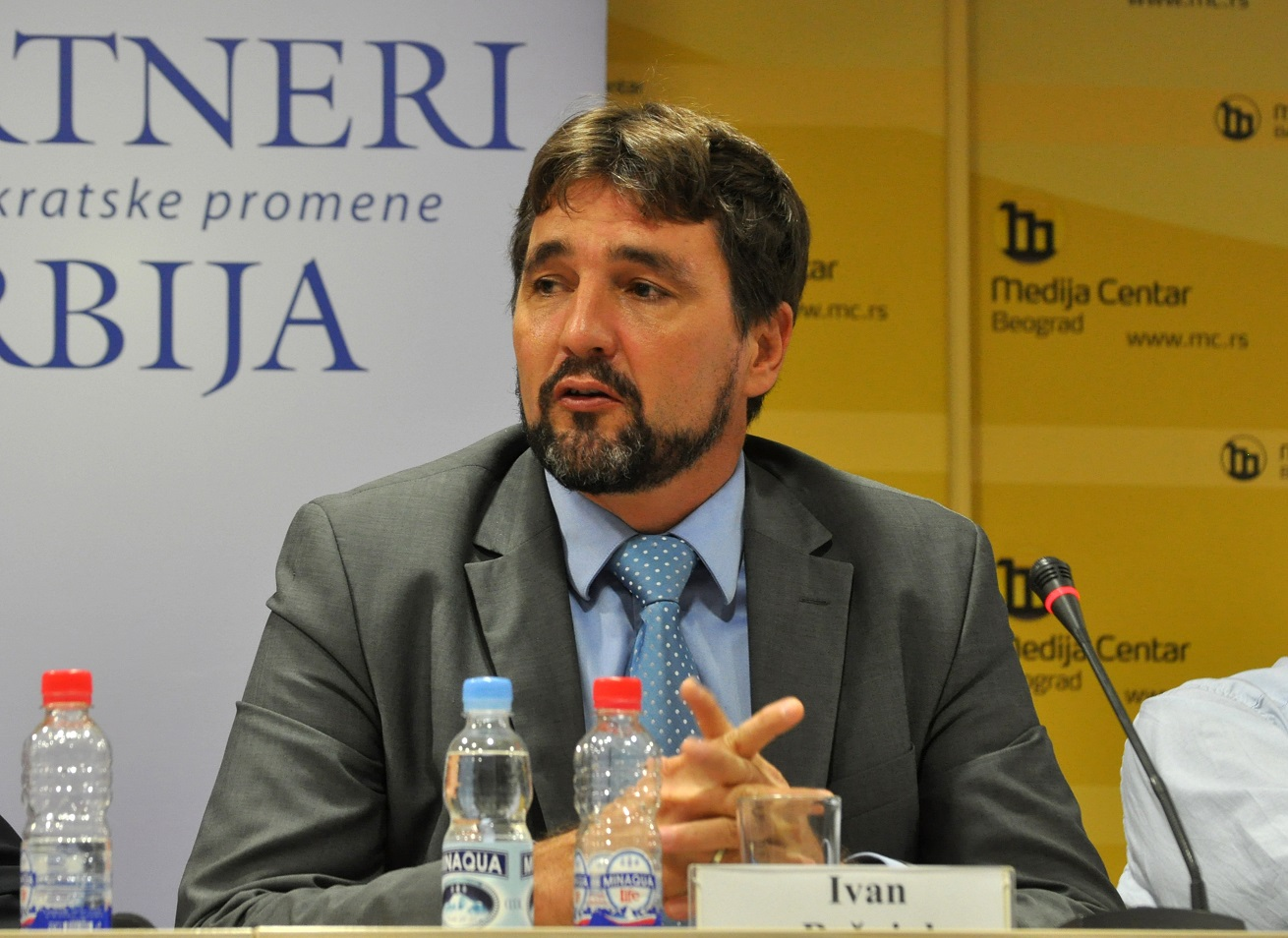
- Bošnjak in 2015

State Secretary in the Ministry of Human and Minority Rights and Social Dialogue
- Incumbent
- Assumed office 2022

State Secretary in the Ministry of Public Administration and Local Self-Government
- In office 2014–2020

Mayor of Zrenjanin
- In office 2012–2014
- Preceded by: Goran Knežević
- Succeeded by: Čedomir Janjić

Member of the Assembly of Vojvodina
- In office 2012–2012

Personal details
- Born: 4 November 1974 (age 51) Melenci, Socialist Republic of Serbia, Socialist Federal Republic of Yugoslavia
- Party: Serbian Progressive Party (SNS)
- Other political affiliations: Democratic Party of Serbia (DSS) (former)
- Education: University of Belgrade (Veterinary Medicine, M.A., Ph.D.)

Military service
- Branch/service: Serbian Army
- Rank: Lieutenant

Ivan Bošnjak (Serbian Cyrillic: Иван Бошњак, pronounced [ǐvan bǒʃɲaːk]; born 4 November 1974) is a Serbian politician and administrator. He was a member of the Assembly of Vojvodina in 2012, served as mayor of Zrenjanin from 2012 to 2014, and was a state secretary in the Serbian ministry of public administration and local self-government from 2014 to 2020. Since late 2022, he serves as a state secretary in the Serbian Ministry of Human and Minority Rights and Social Dialogue. Bošnjak is a member of the Serbian Progressive Party (Srpska Napredna Stranka, SNS).

== Early life and career ==
Bošnjak was born in the village of Melenci in the municipality of Zrenjanin, Vojvodina, in what was then the Socialist Republic of Serbia in the Socialist Federal Republic of Yugoslavia. He graduated from the University of Belgrade Faculty of Veterinary Medicine in 2000, earned a master's degree in 2010, and received his Ph.D. in 2016. He has also served as a reserve lieutenant in the Serbian Army.

== Politician ==
Bošnjak entered political life as a member of the Democratic Party of Serbia (Demokratska stranka Srbije, DSS), appearing in the seventh position on a combined DSS–New Serbia electoral list in Zrenjanin for the 2008 Serbian local elections. The list received four mandates, and he did not serve in the assembly that followed. He later joined the SNS.

He was elected to the Vojvodina provincial assembly in the 2012 provincial election, winning Zrenjanin's third constituency seat in the second round. He also received the eighth position on the SNS's list for Zrenjanin in the 2012 local elections and was elected when the list won twenty-four mandates. The Democratic Party (Demokratska stranka, DS) and its allies formed government at the provincial level, and Bošnjak served in opposition. At the city level, the SNS and its allies formed a coalition government, and Bošnjak supported the administration.

Goran Knežević became mayor of Zrenjanin in the immediate aftermath of the 2012 local elections, but he soon resigned to take a position in the government of Serbia. Bošnjak was chosen as the city's new mayor on 21 August 2012. He resigned from the provincial assembly on 14 December 2012 as he could not hold a dual mandate. In January 2014, he signed a friendship and co-operation agreement with the Croatian municipality of Krnjak; this was the first such agreement between municipalities in Serbia and Croatia to be arranged at the consular level.

Bošnjak was appointed as a state secretary in Serbia's ministry of public administration and local self-government after the 2014 Serbian parliamentary election, and he formally resigned as mayor on 12 June 2014. He served in the ministry for the next six years, standing down after the 2020 parliamentary election. In a 2017 interview, he defended the Serbian government's policy on the rights of national minority communities.

== Electoral record ==
=== Provincial (Vojvodina) ===
2012 Vojvodina assembly election Zrenjanin III (constituency seat) - First and Second Rounds
Ivan Bošnjak	Coalition: Let's Get Vojvodina Moving–Tomislav Nikolić (Serbian Progressive Party, New Serbia, Movement of Socialists, Strength of Serbia Movement) (Affiliation: Serbian Progressive Party)	5,769	29.03	7,971	51.23
Dr. Dragan Tošić	Coalition: Socialist Party of Serbia (SPS), Party of United Pensioners of Serbia (PUPS), United Serbia (JS), Social Democratic Party of Serbia (SDPS) (Affiliation: Socialist Party of Serbia)	3,269	16.45	7,588	48.77
Dragan Stanišić (incumbent)	Coalition: Choice for a Better Vojvodina–Bojan Pajtić (Affiliation: Democratic Party)	2,703	13.60		
Jovica Momirov	Coalition: League of Social Democrats of Vojvodina	2,699	13.58		
Čedomir Janjić	Democratic Party of Serbia	2,078	10.46		
Siniša Gajin	Serbian Radical Party	1,537	7.73		
Vitomir Eremić	Coalition: U-Turn (Affiliation: Liberal Democratic Party)	1,034	5.20		
Branislav Markuš	Citizens' Group: Equality Movement–I Love Zrenjanin	785	3.95		
Total valid votes		19,874	100	15,559	100
