= Dragan Milošević =

Serbian politician and doctor

Dragan Milošević (Serbian Cyrillic: Драган Милошевић; born 12 December 1954) is a doctor, politician, and administrator in Serbia. He served in the Assembly of Vojvodina from 2000 to 2004 and has been a member of the Novi Sad city assembly. During his time as an elected official, Milošević was a member of the Democratic Party (Demokratska stranka, DS).

== Private career ==
Milošević is a medical doctor.

== Politician ==
Milošević was a member of the Novi Sad city assembly in the 1997–2000 term and served on the DS's executive board for Vojvodina in the same period. He was a prominent opponent of Slobodan Milošević's government at this time, speaking at a number of rallies against the administration.

The DS participated in the 2000 Vojvodina provincial election and the concurrent 2000 Serbian local elections as part of the Democratic Opposition of Serbia (DOS), a broad and ideologically diverse coalition of parties opposed to the rule of Slobodan Milošević and his allies. Dragan Milošević was elected to the Vojvodina assembly for Novi Sad's seventh division and was also re-elected to the city assembly. The DOS won landslide victories at both levels of government, and Milošević served in both assemblies as an administration supporter. He did not seek re-election at either level of government in 2004.

Milošević appeared on the DS's electoral list for Novi Sad in the 2008 Serbian local elections, although he was not given a mandate afterwards.

== Administrator ==
Milošević has served two terms as director of the preschool institution Radosno detinjstvo, including a brief term as acting director in 2012. In August 2012, he said that austerity measures would need to be introduced because of pressing debts. The following month, he was reassigned as director of Novi Sad's Gerontology Centre.

== Electoral record ==
=== Provincial (Vojvodina) ===
2000 Vojvodina provincial election: Novi Sad Division 7
Candidate	Party	First round		Second round	
Candidate	Party	Votes	%	Votes	%
Dragan Milošević	Democratic Opposition of Serbia (Affiliation: Democratic Party)		47.47		63.55
Rade Bajić	Socialist Party of Serbia–Yugoslav Left (Affiliation: Socialist Party of Serbia)		30.55		23.28
Milorad Mirčić	Serbian Radical Party		?		11.24
other candidates?					
Total					
Source: All percentages listed are preliminary.
