= Srboljub Bubnjević =

Politician and administrator in Serbia

Srboljub Bubnjević (Serbian Cyrillic: Србољуб Бубњевић; born 14 January 1966) is a politician and administrator in Serbia. He served in the Assembly of Vojvodina from 2008 to 2016 as a member of the Democratic Party (Demokratska stranka, DS).

== Private career ==
Bubnjević is from Novi Sad and is a sociology professor in private life.

== Politician and administrator ==
Bubnjević was first elected to the Vojvodina assembly in the 2008 provincial election, winning a narrow victory in Novi Sad's seventh division. The DS contested this election as the dominant party in the For a European Vojvodina alliance, which won a majority of seats in the assembly; Bubnjević served as a government supporter in the term that followed. He also received the thirty-ninth position on the electoral list of the For a European Novi Sad alliance in the concurrent 2008 Serbian local elections. The alliance won a plurality victory with thirty out of seventy-eight seats and afterwards formed a local coalition government. Bubnjević did not take a seat in the city assembly but was instead appointed as director of the city-run funeral company Lisje.

In July 2011, Bubnjević was responsible for causing an automobile accident while driving an official Lisje car with a blood alcohol level over the legal limit. The accident did not result in any injuries or serious property damage. Bubnjević acknowledged the incident, described it as a private matter, and said that he was prepared to face the legal consequences for his actions. He was not removed from his position.

He offered to resign as Lisje director in September 2011, following changes in Serbia's conflict-of-interest laws that appeared to prevent him from holding the office while also serving in the provincial assembly. He subsequently withdrew his resignation pending a review by the Anti-Corruption Agency. Ultimately, he was not found to be in a conflict and continued serving in the role until 2012.

Bubnjević was one of the largest donors to the DS from Novi Sad in 2012. Critics charged that he, and other company directors appointed by the city administration, were required to give five per cent of their earnings to the party. He rejected this charge, saying that the contribution was voluntary.

Bubnjević was re-elected for Novi Sad's seventh division in the 2012 Vojvodina provincial election. The DS contested this election at the head of the Choice for a Better Vojvodina alliance, which won a plurality victory and was able to form a coalition government afterwards; Bubnjević continued serving as a government supporter. The DS also initially held power in Novi Sad after the concurrent 2012 Serbian local elections, and Bubnjević was on this occasion appointed by the city administration as assistant director of the public company Čistoća. He stood down from the role when the DS city administration was defeated later in the year.

He was not a candidate in the 2016 provincial election.

== Electoral record ==
=== Provincial (Vojvodina) ===
2012 Vojvodina assembly election Novi Sad VII (constituency seat) - First and Second Rounds
| Candidate | Party or Coalition | Votes | % | Votes | % |
|---|---|---|---|---|---|
| Srboljub Bubnjević (incumbent) | Choice for a Better Vojvodina (Affiliation: Democratic Party) | 5,507 | 26.06 | 10,094 | 52.54 |
| Petar Novaković | Let's Get Vojvodina Moving | 5,080 | 24.04 | 9,117 | 47.46 |
| Petar Krstić | League of Social Democrats of Vojvodina | 2,705 | 12.80 | | |
| Novak Trkulja | Socialist Party of Serbia–Party of United Pensioners of Serbia–United Serbia–Social Democratic Party of Serbia | 2,555 | 12.09 | | |
| Milorad Mirčić | Serbian Radical Party | 2,294 | 10.86 | | |
| Ostoja Simetić | Democratic Party of Serbia | 1,037 | 4.91 | | |
| Milja Obradović | Maja Gojković–United Regions of Serbia | 985 | 4.66 | | |
| Željko Milešev | Serb Democratic Party | 968 | 4.58 | | |
| Total valid votes | | 21,131 | 100 | 19,211 | 100 |

2008 Vojvodina assembly election Novi Sad VII (constituency seat) - First and Second Rounds
| Candidate | Party or Coalition | Votes | % | Votes | % |
|---|---|---|---|---|---|
| Srboljub Bubnjević | For a European Vojvodina: Democratic Party–G17 Plus, Boris Tadić (Affiliation: Democratic Party) | 4,435 | 21.50 | 6,188 | 51.18 |
| Vučeta Tošković | Serbian Radical Party | 5,669 | 27.49 | 5,903 | 48.82 |
| Branko Bošković | Citizens' Group: Maja Gojković | 2,672 | 12.96 | | |
| Petar Viđikant | Socialist Party of Serbia–Party of United Pensioners of Serbia | 2,460 | 11.93 | | |
| Paja Dobanovački | Coalition: Together for Vojvodina - Nenad Čanak | 2,171 | 10.53 | | |
| Milanko Grbić | Democratic Party of Serbia–New Serbia | 1,636 | 7.93 | | |
| Milan Paroški | People's Movement for Vojvodina | 1,581 | 7.67 | | |
| Total valid votes | | 20,624 | 100 | 12,091 | 100 |
| Invalid ballots | | 1,088 | | 290 | |
| Total votes casts | | 21,712 | | 12,381 | 32.60 |
