= Marko Maksimović (politician) =

Serbian politician

Marko Maksimović (Serbian Cyrillic: Марко Максимовић; born 1947) is a Serbian former politician. He served in the Yugoslavian parliament and was the mayor of Šabac from 1993 to 2000. During his time as an elected official, Maksimović was a member of the Socialist Party of Serbia (SPS).

== Private career ==
Maksimović is a graduated traffic engineer.

== Politician ==
=== Socialist Party of Serbia representative ===
The Socialist Party of Serbia dominated Serbian and Yugoslavian political life in the 1990s, under the authoritarian leadership of Slobodan Milošević.

In May 1992, the newly established Federal Republic of Yugoslavia, comprising Serbia and Montenegro, held the first election for its lower house (i.e., the Chamber of Citizens) under a system of mixed proportional representation. Maksimović was elected for the Šabac division as the Socialist Party won a majority victory overall.

Following protests, a new federal election was held in December 1992 under a system of full proportional representation. Maksimović appeared in the ninth position on the SPS's list for the expanded Užice division. The Socialists won five out of eleven seats in the division, and he was not assigned a new mandate. (For this election, the first one-third of the assembly mandates were assigned to candidates on successful lists in numerical order, and the remaining two-thirds were assigned to other candidates at the discretion of the sponsoring parties. Maksimović could have been given a mandate despite his low position on the list, but this did not occur.)

He was elected to the Šabac municipal assembly in the December 1992 Serbian local elections, which took place concurrently with the federal vote. He was chosen afterward as the assembly president, a position that was at the time equivalent to mayor. In 1995, he signed a twinning agreement with Argostoli on the island of Cephalonia in Greece; the "Abrašević" arts group afterward began making annual retreats to the Greek city, which also became known for welcoming students and athletes from Šabac.

The Federal Republic of Yugoslavia's ten existing electoral units were divided into thirty-six smaller divisions for the 1996 Yugoslavian parliamentary election. The Socialist Party's alliance won two of the three seats in the new Šabac constituency, and Maksimović was elected to another term in the federal assembly. The SPS's alliance won the election, and Maksimović served afterward as a supporter of the federal ministry.

Maksimović was also re-elected to the Šabac assembly in the 1996 Serbian local elections, which again took place concurrently with the federal vote. These elections were marked by weeks of controversy, as the SPS governing authorities refused to recognize victories by the opposition Zajedno alliance in many of Serbia's major cities. In Šabac, neither the SPS's alliance nor Zajedno won a clear victory, and the results were heavily disputed in one particular division that was important to the overall balance of power. The SPS delegates ultimately convened an assembly in spite of an opposition boycott, ratified all of the municipality's mandates on terms favourable to themselves, and elected Maksimović to a new term as mayor. Although the opposition considered his rule to be illegitimate, he remained in office for the full term that followed. During this period, Maksimović was also the leader of the SPS's board for the Mačva District and was considered a possible rising star in the party, given the dearth of prominent figures from the area.

=== 2000 elections and after ===
Slobodan Milošević was defeated by Vojislav Koštunica in the 2000 Yugoslavian presidential election and subsequently fell from power. This was a watershed moment in Serbian and Yugoslavian politics, resulting in the fall of the SPS from its previously dominant position. Maksimović was not re-elected to the Yugoslavian assembly in the concurrent parliamentary vote; online sources do not indicate if he was a candidate. The Democratic Opposition of Serbia (DOS) also defeated the Socialist Party in the 2000 Serbian local elections, and Maksimović's tenure as mayor came to an end.

Shortly after Milošević's defeat, some dissident members of the SPS formed a breakaway group called the Democratic Socialist Party (DSP). Maksimović joined the new party and appeared in the sixty-fifth position on its electoral list in a snap Serbian parliamentary election held in December 2000. The list did not cross the electoral threshold for assembly representation.

Serbia introduced the direct election of mayors in 2004 local elections, and Maksimović ran in Šabac under the banner of his own local political movement, Voice of People. He finished in seventh place with less than five per cent of the vote. He does not appear to have sought a return to public life after this time.

== Electoral record ==
=== Federal (FR Yugoslavia) ===
May 1992 Yugoslavian federal election: Šabac
Candidate	Party	Votes	%
Marko Maksimović	Socialist Party of Serbia	28,745	39.80
Čedomir Vasiljević	Serbian Radical Party	20,266	28.06
Dr. Dragiša Rajić	Citizens' Group	8,834	12.23
Mihajlo Bata Božanić	Citizens' Group	6,272	8.68
Milan Veselinović	Citizens' Group	3,267	4.52
Slobodan Nedić	Citizens' Group	2,538	3.51
Vojislav Stanišić	League of Communists – Movement for Yugoslavia	2,303	3.19
Total		72,225	100.00

=== Local (Šabac) ===
2004 Municipality of Šabac local election: Mayor of Šabac
Candidate	Party	First round		Second round	
Candidate	Party	Votes	%	Votes	%
Miloš Milošević	Democratic Party–Serbian Renewal Movement (Affiliation: Democratic Party)	13,543	38.82	16,696	63.58
Srboljub Živanović	Serbian Radical Party–Tomislav Nikolić	5,832	16.72	9,564	36.42
Jasmina Milutinović	Democratic Party of Serbia–Vojislav Koštunica, NDS (Affiliation: Democratic Party of Serbia)	4,205	12.05		
Mile Isaković	Strength of Serbia Movement	3,341	9.58		
Stanoje Pantelić	not listed	3,325	9.53		
Negoslav Gačić	G17 Plus	1,683	4.82		
Marko Maksimović	Citizens' Group: Voice of the People	1,626	4.66		
Marko Todorović	Citizens' Group: For a Better Life for All Citizens	731	2.10		
Momir Glišić	New Serbia	597	1.71		
Total		34,883	100.00	26,260	100.00
Valid votes		34,883	96.92		
Invalid/blank votes		1,109	3.08		
Total votes		35,992	100.00		
Registered voters/turnout		100,390	35.85		
Source: The first round results may be preliminary rather than final totals.
