= Miroslav Negrojević =

Serbian medical doctor and politician (1946-2010)

Miroslav Negrojević (Serbian Cyrillic: Мирослав Негројевић; 29 August 1946 – 26 March 2010) was a Serbian surgeon and politician. He served in the Serbian parliament from 1994 to 1997 and was a deputy mayor of Novi Sad from 1996 to 1997. He entered politics as a member of the Serbian Renewal Movement (SPO), although he left the party in 1997.

== Early life and private career ==
Negrojević was born in Zrenjanin, in what was then the People's Republic of Serbia in the Federal People's Republic of Yugoslavia. His father was incarcerated by Yugoslavia's post-war authorities shortly before his birth; after his release, the family moved first to Doboj and then to Zvornik, both in the People's Republic of Bosnia and Herzegovina. Negrojević completed high school in Zvornik, graduated from the University of Belgrade Faculty of Medicine, and then returned to Zvornik to work as a surgeon. He later completed specialization in urology in Novi Sad and became the head of the city's surgical department. While serving as a foreign assistant at Claude Bernard University Lyon 1, he published widely in his field.

== Politician ==
=== Early years (1992–94) ===
Negrojević was chair of the SPO's Novi Sad municipal committee in 1992. In April of that year, he explained the party's reasons for boycotting the upcoming May 1992 federal and local elections and called for a constituent assembly. This demand was not granted, but the SPO nonetheless ended its election boycott later in the year.

The SPO founded a multi-party alliance called the Democratic Movement of Serbia (DEPOS) in 1992; DEPOS, in turn, contested the December 1992 Serbian local elections in Novi Sad in a broader electoral alliance with the Democratic Party (DS) and the Reform Democratic Party of Vojvodina (RDSV). Negrojević was elected to the Novi Sad assembly in this campaign, winning in the city's seventeenth division. The overall result of the election was a virtual three-way tie between the alliance around DEPOS, the Socialist Party of Serbia (SPS), and the Serbian Radical Party (SRS). The Socialists and Radicals formed a coalition government after the election, while DEPOS served in opposition. In January 1993, Negrojević ran as a DEPOS candidate for vice-president of the assembly, a position that was at the time equivalent to deputy mayor, and was defeated.

Negrojević also appeared in the sixteenth position on DEPOS's electoral list for the Novi Sad division in the 1992 Serbian parliamentary election, which took place concurrently with the municipal vote. DEPOS won five seats in the division, and he did not receive a mandate. (From 1992 to 2000, Serbia's electoral law stipulated that one-third of parliamentary mandates would be assigned to candidates from successful lists in numerical order, while the remaining two-thirds would be distributed amongst other candidates at the discretion of the sponsoring parties. It was common practice for the latter mandates to be awarded out of order. Negrojević could have been chosen for a mandate despite his list position, but this did not happen.)

In 1994, Miroslav Negrojević together with archaeologist Đorđe Gačić from the Novi Sad City Museum, drew public attention to the mass executions of approximately 200–250 prominent citizens of Novi Sad that took place in late 1944 near Rajina šuma (Raja forest), close to Kać. The event is sometimes referred to as the Massacre at Raja forest (Serbian: Masakr u Rajinoj šumi). The victims, many of them intellectuals, industrialists, and pre-war public figures, were arrested and shot on the orders of General Josip Rukavina, commander of the military district for Bačka and Baranja. Most executions were carried out by members of the 11th Vojvodina Assault Brigade in the weeks following the entry of Josip Broz Tito's partisan forces into Novi Sad on October 23rd 1944. The mass graves were accidentally discovered in March 1991 during excavation work for the city's water supply infrastructure. Negrojević and Gačić participated in the initial handling and investigation of the exhumed remains. In May 1994, at Negrojević's initiative, the Novi Sad City Assembly adopted a decision to officially commemorate the victims for the first time since 1944. Their efforts to launch a fuller investigation and exhumation faced resistance and were repeatedly diluted or blocked by representatives of the ruling Socialist Party of Serbia (SPS). This opposition created lasting animosity toward Negrojević from SPS circles that persisted until his death.

=== Parliamentarian (1994–97) and Deputy Mayor (1996–97) ===
Negrojević was promoted to the second position on DEPOS's electoral list for Novi Sad in the 1993 Serbian parliamentary election and was elected when the list won four seats in the division. The Socialist Party won the election, and the DEPOS coalition dissolved shortly thereafter; most of its elected members, including those elected for the SPO, served in opposition. When the assembly convened in early 1994, Negrojević was appointed to the committee on health, demographic policy, and family.

In 1996, the SPO joined with the Democratic Party and the Civic Alliance of Serbia (GSS) to form the Zajedno (Together) coalition. The coalition won a majority victory in the Novi Sad city assembly in the 1996 local elections with thirty-nine out of seventy seats. When the new local assembly met in December 1996, Mihajlo Svilar of the SPO was chosen as the city's mayor, and Negrojević became one of three deputy mayors.

Ultimately, both Svilar and Negrojević had only brief terms in office. The SPO experienced serious internal divisions after the election, and Svilar and Negrojević emerged as prominent opponents of party leader Vuk Drašković, whom they accused of trying to control the Novi Sad government from Belgrade. During this period, Svilar also made accusations of corruption at high levels in the city government and threatened to resign from the SPO if differences between the Zajedno parties were not resolved. On 3 June 1997, Svilar and Negrojević, along with other city assembly members, left the main SPO assembly group to form a new group called SPO–Zajedno. On 17 June 1997, the city assembly voted to remove Svilar as mayor and Negrojević as deputy mayor.

Svilar and Negrojević subsequently contested the 1997 Serbian parliamentary election on an independent list called "Novi Sad Blok and the Association of War Veterans 1990." Svilar appeared in the lead position, and Negrojević appeared in second place. The list did not win any mandates, and Negrojević's parliamentary term ended in that year.

=== After 1997 ===
Negrojević was re-elected to the Novi Sad city assembly in the 2000 Serbian local elections with an endorsement from the Democratic Opposition of Serbia (DOS), a coalition of parties opposed the continued rule of SPS leader Slobodan Milošević; the SPO was not part of the coalition. The DOS won a landslide victory with fifty-nine out of ninety seats in the city assembly, and Negrojević served afterward in an assembly group with members of the Democratic Party.

== Death ==
While Negrojević was performing a multi-hour surgery on a patient, a colleague inadvertently pricked Negrojević with a suture needle from a patient infected with Hepatitis C. This chronic illness caused the development of liver cancer. Negrojević died in 2010.

== Electoral record ==
=== Local (Novi Sad) ===
1996 Novi Sad municipal election: Division 36 (second round)
Candidate	Party
Miloslav Negrojević (incumbent) (ELECTED)	Zajedno (Affiliation: Serbian Renewal Movement)
Dragan Nedeljković (incumbent)	Socialist Party of Serbia
Total

December 1992 Novi Sad municipal election: Division 17
Candidate	Party
Miloslav Negrojević (ELECTED)	Democratic Movement of Serbia–Reform Democratic Party of Vojvodina–Democratic Party (Affiliation: Democratic Movement of Serbia, Serbian Renewal Movement)
Tomislav Jakobac	Democratic Alliance of Croats in Vojvodina
Žarko Putnik (incumbent)	Socialist Party of Serbia
Jelica Sedlan	Serb Democratic Party–People's Party
Vesna Živanov	Serbian Radical Party
Total
Source: All candidates except Negrojević are listed alphabetically.
