= Srboljub Živanović =

Serbian politician

Srboljub Živanović (Serbian Cyrillic: Србољуб Живановић; born 5 May 1953) is a Serbian politician. He has served four terms in the Serbian parliament and one term in the federal assembly of Serbia and Montenegro. Živanović is a member of the far-right Serbian Radical Party (SRS).

He is not to be confused with a Serbian anthropologist of the same name.

== Early life and career ==
Živanović was born in Šabac, in what was then the People's Republic of Serbia in the Federal People's Republic of Yugoslavia. He graduated from the University of Priština Faculty of Mechanical Engineering in 1980 and earned a master's degree from the University of Novi Sad Faculty of Mechanical Engineering in 1988, and later worked as a manager at the company Zorka. During his political career, he lived in the Šabac borough of Jelenča.

== Politician ==
=== Early candidacies ===
Živanović appeared in the second position on the Radical Party's electoral list for the Šabac division in the 2000 Yugoslavian parliamentary election. The party did not win any seats in the division. He also ran in Šabac's fifty-seventh constituency ward in the concurrent 2000 Serbian local elections and, like all SRS candidates in the city, was defeated.

=== Parliamentarian ===
The 2000 Yugoslavian election was a watershed moment in Serbian politics, in which longtime leader Slobodan Milošević was defeated by Vojislav Koštunica and subsequently fell from power. The Serbian government fell soon after the Yugoslavian vote, and a new Serbian parliamentary election was called for December 2000. Serbia's electoral system was reformed prior to the vote, such that the entire country became a single constituency and all mandates were awarded to candidates at the discretion of the sponsoring parties or coalitions, irrespective of numerical order. Živanović appeared in the seventy-fifth position on the Radical Party's list and was awarded a mandate after the list won twenty-three out of 250 seats. The Democratic Opposition of Serbia (DOS) won a majority victory, and the Radical delegates served in opposition for the term that followed. Živanović took his seat when the new assembly convened in January 2001.

He was given the nineteenth position on the Radical Party's list in the 2003 parliamentary election and received a mandate for another term after the list won eighty-two seats. Although the Radicals won more seats than any other party, they fell well short of a majority and ultimately remained in opposition. Živanović's second term was in any event very short. By virtue of its performance in the 2003 election, the Radicals had the right to appoint thirty members to the federal assembly of Serbia and Montenegro. Živanović was chosen as one of his party's delegates and so resigned from the republican parliament on 12 February 2004.

Serbia introduced the direct election of mayors for the 2004 Serbian local elections. Živanović was the Radical Party's candidate in Šabac and was defeated in the second round of voting. He was elected in the concurrent municipal assembly election and served in opposition for the term that followed. The Radical Party's city board became divided during this time, amid significant acrimony between Živanović and his colleague Mira Blagojević, who ultimately left the party.

Živanović remained a member of the federal assembly until 2006, when the State Union of Serbia and Montenegro dissolved following Montenegro's declaration of independence. He later received the fifty-fourth position on the Radical Party's list in the 2007 Serbian parliamentary election and was once again awarded a national assembly mandate after the list won eighty-one seats. As in 2003, the Radicals won more seats than any party, fell short of a majority, and served in opposition. In his third term, Živanović was a member of the education committee and the committee on science and technological development. During a December 2007 speech, he was widely believed to have said that Zoran Đinđić (a former Serbian prime minister assassinated in 2003) "should have" been killed as a traitor. Aleksandar Vučić, at the time Živanović's colleague in the Radical Party, explained this as a misunderstanding resulting from a grammatical error.

The coalition government that was formed after the 2007 election proved unstable, and a new election was called in 2008. Živanović received the seventy-first position on the Radical Party's list and was again chosen for a mandate after the list won seventy-eight seats. The overall results of the election were inconclusive, and the Radicals afterward held discussions with the Democratic Party of Serbia (DSS) and the Socialist Party of Serbia (SPS) about forming a new coalition government. This ultimately did not happen. The Socialists instead joined a coalition government led by the For a European Serbia (ZES) alliance, and the Radicals again served in opposition. Notwithstanding this, Živanović became chair of the science and technological development committee, as well as being a member of the committee on transport and communications and the parliamentary friendship group with Romania.

Źivanović was also re-elected to the Šabac city assembly in the 2008 local elections, which were held concurrently with the parliamentary vote. The Democratic Party (DS) won the election, and the Radicals continued to serve in opposition at the city level as well.

=== Radical Party split and after ===
The Radical Party experienced a serious split in late 2008, with several of its members joining the more moderate Serbian Progressive Party (SNS) under the leadership of Tomislav Nikolić and Aleksandar Vučić. Živanović remained with the Radicals and was considered a loyalist supporter of party leader Vojislav Šešelj, to the point of personally removing posters of Nikolić from the SRS offices in Šabac. He was later alleged to have been involved in several violent incidents against members of the Progressive Party, reportedly kicking Nikolić and repeatedly cursing his mother, insulting Jorgovanka Tabaković "as a woman and a mother," physically attacking Predrag Mijatović at a pedestrian crossing, and punching Igor Bečić in the nose.

In 2011, Živanović spoke at an event in Šabac protesting the arrest of Božidar Vučurević, who served as mayor of Trebinje during the Bosnian War.

Serbia's electoral system was again reformed in 2011, such that all parliamentary mandates were awarded to candidates on successful lists in numerical order. Živanović appeared in the forty-third position on the Radical Party's list in the 2012 parliamentary election. Weakened by the split four years earlier, the party fell below the electoral threshold for assembly representation, and Živanović lost his seat. The Radicals also fell below the threshold in Šabac in the concurrent 2012 local elections, and his term in the city assembly also came to an end.

Živanović was given the sixty-fourth position on the SRS list in the 2014 parliamentary election. Once again, the party fell below the electoral threshold. He has not sought a return to the assembly since this time.

== Electoral record ==
=== Local (Šabac) ===
2004 Municipality of Šabac local election: Mayor of Šabac
Candidate	Party	First round		Second round	
Candidate	Party	Votes	%	Votes	%
Miloš Milošević	Democratic Party–Serbian Renewal Movement (Affiliation: Democratic Party)	13,543	38.82	16,696	63.58
Srboljub Živanović	Serbian Radical Party–Tomislav Nikolić	5,832	16.72	9,564	36.42
Jasmina Milutinović	Democratic Party of Serbia–Vojislav Koštunica, NDS (Affiliation: Democratic Party of Serbia)	4,205	12.05		
Mile Isaković	Strength of Serbia Movement	3,341	9.58		
Stanoje Pantelić	not listed	3,325	9.53		
Negoslav Gačić	G17 Plus	1,683	4.82		
Marko Maksimović	Citizens' Group: Voice of the People	1,626	4.66		
Marko Todorović	Citizens' Group: For a Better Life for All Citizens	731	2.10		
Momir Glišić	New Serbia	597	1.71		
Total		34,883	100.00	26,260	100.00
Valid votes		34,883	96.92		
Invalid/blank votes		1,109	3.08		
Total votes		35,992	100.00		
Registered voters/turnout		100,390	35.85		
Source: The first round results may be preliminary rather than final totals.

2000 Šabac municipal election: Division 57
Candidate	Party
Srboljub Živanović (DEFEATED)	Serbian Radical Party
other candidates	
Total
