= Maleševci, Bosansko Grahovo =

Maleševci Малешевци
- Village
- Location within Bosnia and Herzegovina
- Coordinates: 44°10′N 16°45′E
- Country: Bosnia and Herzegovina
- Entity: Federation of Bosnia and Herzegovina
- Canton: Canton 10
- Municipality: Bosansko Grahovo

Area
  - Total: 30.19 km^{2} (11.66 sq mi)

Population (2013)
  - Total: 53
  - Density: 1.8/km^{2} (4.5/sq mi)
- Time zone: UTC+1 (CET)
  - Summer (DST): UTC+2 (CEST)

Maleševci (Serbian Cyrillic: Малешевци) is a village in the Municipality of Bosansko Grahovo in Canton 10 of the Federation of Bosnia and Herzegovina, an entity of Bosnia and Herzegovina.

== Demographics ==
According to the 2013 census, its population was 53.

Ethnicity in 2013
Ethnicity	Number	Percentage
Serbs	52	98.1%
other/undeclared	1	1.9%
Total	53	100%

== Bibliography ==
- Ethnicity/National Affiliation, Religion and Mother Tongue (PDF). Sarajevo: Agency for Statistics of Bosnia and Herzegovina. 2019.
