= City Assembly of Novi Sad =

Legislature of Novi Sad, Serbia

City Assembly of Novi Sad Скупштина Града Новог Сада Skupština Grada Novog Sada
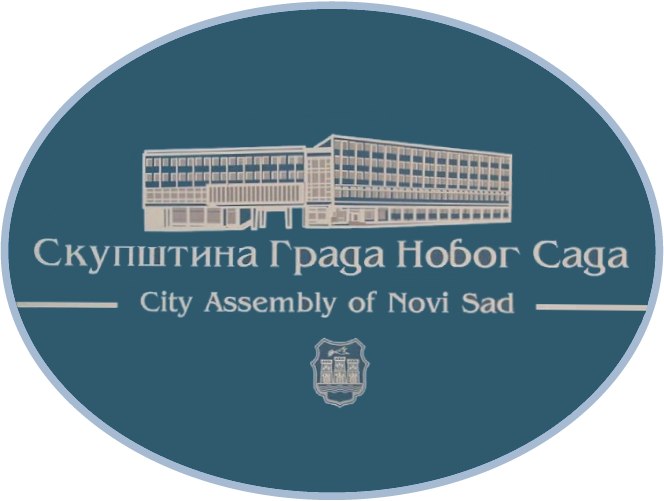
- Logo of the City Assembly

Type
- Type: Unicameral

Leadership
- President: Dina Vučinić, SNS
- Deputy President: Kristina Karaić, SNS

Structure
- Seats: 78
- Political groups: Diagram shows the 2024 election result; figures below show the current councillor groups. Government (47): AV – Novi Sad Tomorrow (36); SPS–JS (5); VMSZ/SVM (3); SRS (3); Opposition (31): KP (8); Heroes – Miša Bačulov (4); NADA (4); SRCE–Bravo (4); NPS–EU (4); DS–PSG–ZLF (4); SSP (3)
- Length of term: 4 years

Elections
- Voting system: Closed-list party-list proportional representation using the D'Hondt method with a 3% electoral threshold (not applied to ethnic minority lists); See Elections in Serbia
- Last election: 2 June 2024
- Next election: No later than 2028

Meeting place
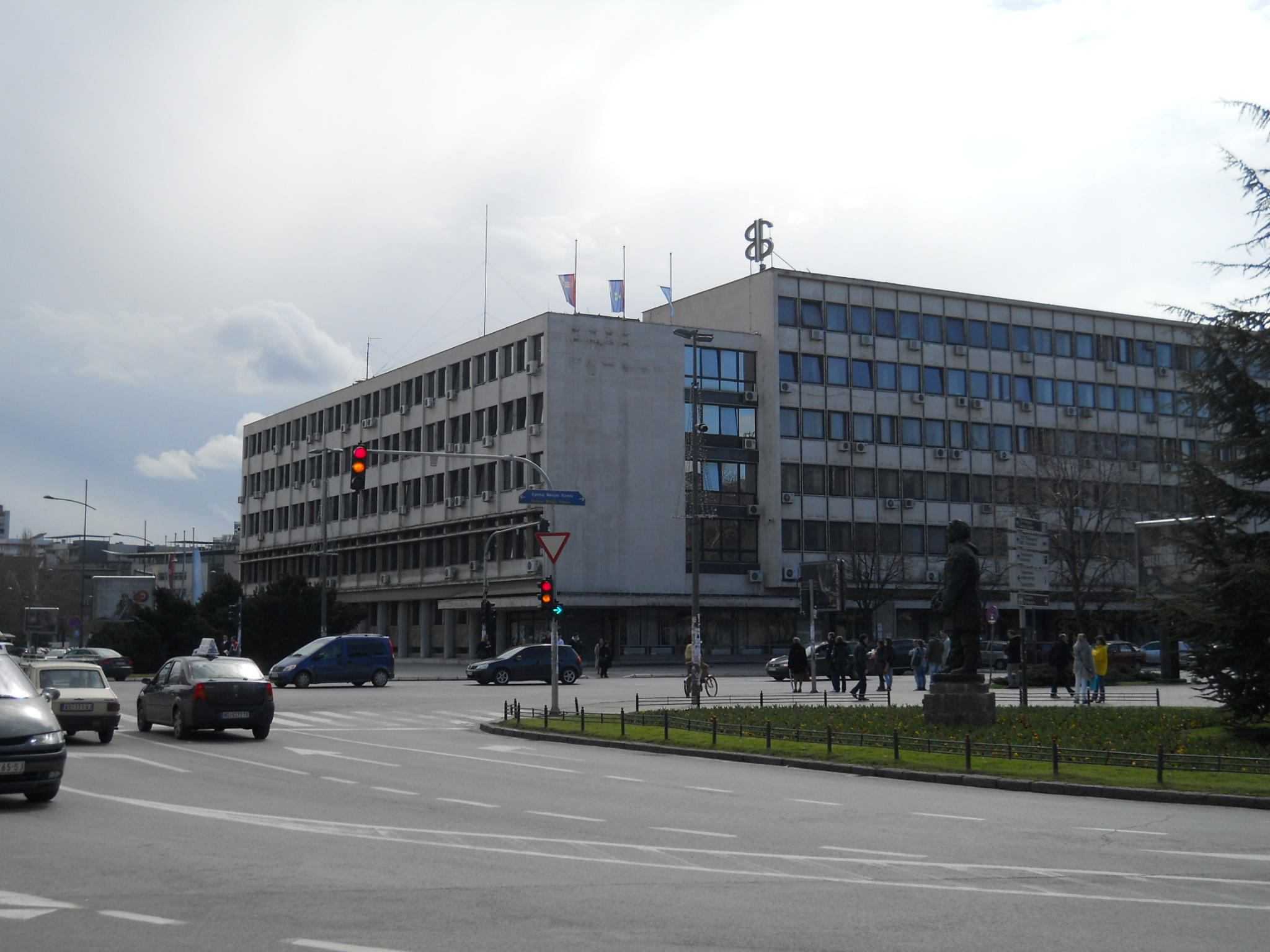
- City Assembly Building; 2 Žarka Zrenjanina Street, Novi Sad

Website
- skupstina.novisad.rs

Constitution
- Statute of the City of Novi Sad

The City Assembly of Novi Sad (Serbian: Скупштина Града Новог Сада, romanized: Skupština Grada Novog Sada) is the legislature of Novi Sad, the capital of the Autonomous Province of Vojvodina in Serbia. It is the highest body of the City, exercising the basic functions of local government set out by the Constitution, the law and the Statute of the City of Novi Sad.

== Powers ==
The City Assembly adopts the Statute of the City and its own Rules of Procedure; adopts the city budget and final accounts; sets local taxes and fees; decides on public borrowing; adopts development programmes, the spatial plan and urban plans; establishes city bodies, public enterprises and institutions and appoints their management; calls city referendums; and decides on the names of streets and squares. It elects and dismisses the President and Deputy President of the Assembly and the Mayor, and, on the Mayor's proposal, the Deputy Mayor and members of the City Council. It also appoints the Secretary and Deputy Secretary of the Assembly, the City Attorney and the local ombudsman.

== Organisation ==
The President of the City Assembly organises its work, convenes and chairs its sessions, proposes the agenda, ensures the transparency of its work and signs the acts it adopts. The Deputy President stands in when the President is absent or unable to act. The Secretary oversees the professional work related to convening and holding sessions of the Assembly and its working bodies, manages the related administrative affairs and heads the Assembly's service.

Presiding officers of the City Assembly
Position	Name	Party
President	Dina Vučinić	Serbian Progressive Party
Deputy President	Kristina Karaić	Serbian Progressive Party

=== Councillor groups ===
Councillors may form councillor groups of at least three members; each councillor may belong to only one group.

Councillor groups in the City Assembly of Novi Sad
Group	Seats
Aleksandar Vučić – Novi Sad Tomorrow	36
Kreni-Promeni Novi Sad	8
Socialist Party of Serbia – United Serbia	5
Citizens' Group Heroes – Miša Bačulov	4
NADA for Novi Sad – New DSS and Monarchists	4
Serbia Centre – Bravo Novi Sad	4
People's Movement of Serbia – Ecological Uprising	4
Democratic Party, Movement of Free Citizens and Green–Left Front	4
Alliance of Vojvodina Hungarians – Dr Bálint Pásztor	3
Party of Freedom and Justice	3
Dr Vojislav Šešelj – Serbian Radical Party	3
Total	78

== Latest election results ==
Party, alliance or citizens' group	Votes	%	+/–	Seats	+/–
Novi Sad Tomorrow	87,791	53.72	−7.15	45	−7
United for a Free Novi Sad	40,541	24.81	New	21	New
I'm Novi Sad Too – Kreni-Promeni	16,723	10.23	New	8	New
Heroes	6,332	3.87	New	3	New
Alliance of Vojvodina Hungarians	2,062	1.26	−0.81	1	−1
I Love Novi Sad	1,747	1.07	New	0	New
Enough Is Enough	1,467	0.90	New	0	New
A Completely Different Story – A City for the Citizens	1,461	0.89	−1.56	0	0
Novi Sad, Capital of Vojvodina	1,386	0.85	New	0	New
Russian Party	1,223	0.75	−0.27	0	−1
Truth – Adaviera	1,063	0.65	−0.45	0	0
For the Right Things, Support GARI	717	0.44	New	0	New
Dad, This Is for You	565	0.35	New	0	New
Slovak Democratic Party	359	0.22	New	0	New
Total	163,437	100.00	–	78	–
Valid votes	163,437	97.79			
Invalid/blank votes	3,698	2.21			
Total votes	167,135	100.00			
Registered voters/turnout	339,233	49.27			
Source: City Election Commission

The previous election was held in 2020.

== See also ==
- President of the City Assembly of Novi Sad
- Mayor of Novi Sad
