= Venko Aleksandrov =

Bulgarian politician

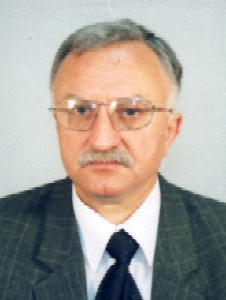

Venko Mitkov Aleksandrov (Bulgarian: Венко Митков Александров; born 20 December 1944) is an academic, medical doctor, and politician in Bulgaria. He served in the National Assembly of Bulgaria from 2001 to 2005 as a member of the National Movement Simeon II.

== Early life and private career ==
Aleksandrov was born in Pordim, in what was then the Kingdom of Bulgaria. He was a noted violinist as a child. He took medical training in France, specializing in anesthesiology, and for many years led the Department of Anesthesiology and Intensive Care at the Higher Medical Institute in Sofia. At one time, he was the personal physician of Todor Zhivkov, leader of the People's Republic of Bulgaria.

He became the chair of the Philharmonic Society of the Sofia Philharmonic Orchestra in 2012. On occasion, he has delivered medical lectures against the backdrop of classical music by composers such as Christoph Willibald Gluck and Hector Berlioz.

== Politician ==
Aleksandrov was elected to the national assembly in the 2001 parliamentary election, winning a seat in the Pleven division. In parliament, he chaired the committee on foreign policy, defence, and security from 2003 to 2005; was a member of the committee on culture; led Bulgaria's delegation to the parliamentary assembly of the Francophonie (where Bulgaria has associate status); led Bulgaria's parliamentary friendship groups with Belarus and France; and served on the friendship group with Italy.

He sought re-election to the assembly in the 2005 parliamentary election, appearing on the National Movement Simeon II's candidate list for a Sofia division. He did not receive a mandate for a second term.
