= Aleksandar Đurić (politician) =

Serbian politician

Aleksandar Đurić (Serbian Cyrillic: Александар Ђурић; born 1930) was a Serbian politician in the 1990s. He served in the National Assembly of Serbia from 1994 to 1997, originally as a member of the far-right Serbian Radical Party (Srpska radikalna stranka, SRS) and later with a caucus of ex-Radical Party members.

== Private career ==
In the 1993 Serbian parliamentary election, Đurić identified as a craftsman and lived in Smederevo.

== Politician ==
Đurić appeared in the third position on the SRS's electoral list for the Smederevo division in the 1993 parliamentary election and was given a mandate after the party won three seats in the division. (From 1992 to 2000, Serbia's electoral law stipulated that one-third of parliamentary mandates would be assigned to candidates from successful lists in numerical order, while the remaining two-thirds would be distributed amongst other candidates on the lists at the discretion of the sponsoring parties. It was common practice for the latter mandates to be awarded out of order. Đurić's list position did not give him the automatic right to a mandate.) He took his seat when the assembly convened in January 1994.

Đurić later joined a dissident faction in the Radical Party, and in 1995 he affiliated with the breakaway Serbian Radical Party – Nikola Pašić (Srpska radikalna stranka – Nikola Pašić, SRS-NP). In July 1995, the latter group accused three SRS parliamentarians of physically preventing Đurić from entering the assembly building.

In late 1996, Đurić joined with five other former Radicals to start a new parliamentary group called "1 December." The SRS sought to overturn their mandates and was successful in expelling three of them from the legislature. Đurić, however, was able to keep his seat.

He did not seek re-election in the 1997 Serbian parliamentary election, and online sources do not indicate his activities after this time. It is unclear from available sources if he is still alive.
