= Serb Democratic Party (Serbia, 2011) =

Serb Democratic Party Српска демократска странка
- Abbreviation: SDS
- President: Dragan Dašić (first); Branislav Švonja (last)
- Founded: 31 August 2011
- Dissolved: after April 2016 (de facto)
- Merged into: Serbian Progressive Party
- Ideology: Serbian nationalism Monarchism
- Political position: Right-wing
- Colours: Red; Blue; White

Website
- www.srpskademokratskastranka.rs (archived)

The Serb Democratic Party (Serbian: Српска демократска странка, romanized: Srpska Demokratska Stranka, abbr. SDS) was a minor political party in Serbia established in 2011 and mostly active in the province of Vojvodina. The party won a single seat in the Assembly of Vojvodina in the 2016 provincial election on the list of the Serbian Progressive Party, after which time it became inactive.

== History and ideology ==
According to the party's website, the SDS was officially registered in late August 2011. It associated itself with the legacy of SDS in Croatia and the SDS in Bosnia and Herzegovina, and its stated purpose was to seek unity among the Serbian people and to end what it described as the dissolution of Serbia. At the time of its founding, the SDS called for the better co-ordination of organizations representing Serb refugees from Croatia, Bosnia and Herzegovina, and Kosovo and Metohija.

Dragan Dašić was selected as the party's president at a meeting in Subotica in February 2012, and the SDS subsequently fielded its own electoral list in the 2012 Vojvodina provincial election. It received less than one per cent of the popular vote, well below the threshold for representation in the assembly.

After a period of limited activity, the SDS re-constituted its executive at a February 2016 meeting in Novi Sad. Entrepreneur Branislav Švonja was selected as its leader, Zoran Subotić was named as its coordinator for Vojvodina, and Radivoj Prodanović became the president of its city board in Novi Sad. On becoming leader, Švonja said that the new SDS followed in the tradition of Jovan Rašković's historical SDS in Croatia (i.e., before the party was taken over by hardline elements) and that it was planning to contest the upcoming 2016 provincial election and the concurrent 2016 local elections as part of the coalition around the Serbian Progressive Party. Subotić ultimately appeared in the sixtieth position on the Progressive Party's list for the provincial assembly and was elected when the list won a majority victory with sixty-three mandates.

The SDS became inactive after this time and may have been disestablished entirely. Subotić became the Vojvodina president of a group called the Community of Serbs during his four-year term in the provincial assembly. In the 2020 local elections, he was elected to the Novi Sad city assembly on the list of Aleksandar Šapić's Serbian Patriotic Alliance.

Švonja was arrested in 2017 due to the activities of a company he had founded. Media coverage of this arrest highlighted the fact that he had previously been convicted of vote-buying for the SDS in an off-year municipal election in Odžaci in 2013. A report from this period described him as having been "involved in politics through various semi-phantom parties and movements" in both Serbia and Croatia over a period of several years. He subsequently became the leader of the Association of Serbs from Bosnia and Herzegovina and Croatia.
