= 2004 Serbian local elections =

Local elections were held in Serbia (excluding Kosovo) on 19 September and 3 October 2004, concurrently with the 2004 Vojvodina provincial election. This was the only local election cycle held while Serbia was a member of the State Union of Serbia and Montenegro.

The 2004 local elections were the first regular local elections held in Serbia after the fall of Slobodan Milošević in October 2000, and the voting procedure was significantly different from that used in the previous cycle. Under the prior system, local assembly members were elected by first-past-the-post balloting in single-member constituencies. The 2004 elections were held under a system of proportional representation with a three per cent electoral threshold. Successful lists were required to receive three per cent of all votes, not only of valid votes.

This cycle also saw the introduction of direct election for the mayors in most of Serbia's cities and municipalities (although not in the constituent municipalities of the City of Belgrade, which were exempted). Mayors were elected over two rounds, with the second round of voting taking place on 3 October 2004. The direct election of mayors was subsequently abandoned, and in future election cycles mayors were chosen by the elected members of the local assemblies.

One-third of assembly mandates were assigned to candidates from successful electoral lists in numerical order. The other two-thirds were assigned to other candidates on the same lists at the discretion of the sponsoring parties or coalitions; at least one quarter of the latter mandates were to be assigned to "members of the less represented sex on the list" (which, in practical terms, usually meant that these mandates were reserved for female candidates).

For the newly restructured constituent municipalities of Niš, elections were held for mayors and for members of nine-person municipal councils (rather than municipal assemblies).

The campaign saw growth in support for both the centre-left Democratic Party and the far-right Serbian Radical Party, both of which were at the time in opposition in the republican parliament.

The most closely watched election was that for mayor of Belgrade. In the second round of voting, Democratic Party candidate Nenad Bogdanović narrowly defeated Aleksandar Vučić, who was at the time a member of the Radical Party.

== Results ==
=== Belgrade ===
==== City of Belgrade ====
The Democratic Party won both the mayoral election and a plurality victory in the city assembly.

2004 City of Belgrade local election: Mayor of Belgrade
Candidate	Party	First round		Second round	
Candidate	Party	Votes	%	Votes	%
Nenad Bogdanović	Democratic Party–Boris Tadić	165,565	33.52	234,513	50.91
Aleksandar Vučić	Serbian Radical Party	145,959	29.55	226,161	49.09
Zoran Drakulić	Democratic Party of Serbia–Vojislav Koštunica	75,548	15.29		
Nebojša Čović	Democratic Alternative–Social Democratic Party–Dr. Nebojša Čović	28,631	5.80		
Jasmina Mitrović Marić	Strength of Serbia Movement	27,599	5.59		
Žarko Obradović	Socialist Party of Serbia	19,062	3.86		
Branka Bošnjak	G17 Plus–Miroljub Labus	15,480	3.13		
Dragan Kojadinović	Serbian Renewal Movement–Vuk Drašković	8,823	1.79		
Slobodan Vuksanović	People's Democratic Party	7,318	1.48		
Total		493,985	100.00	460,674	100.00
Valid votes		493,985	98.59	460,674	98.59
Invalid/blank votes		7,071	1.41	6,584	1.41
Total votes		501,056	100.00	467,258	100.00
Registered voters/turnout		1,444,307	34.69	1,445,377	32.33

Bogdanović died on 27 September 2007. He was replaced on an interim basis by Zoran Alimpić, also of the Democratic Party.

Results of the election for the City Assembly of Belgrade:

Party	Votes	%	Seats
Democratic Party–Boris Tadić	160,594	32.82	34
Serbian Radical Party–Tomislav Nikolić	131,044	26.78	27
Democratic Party of Serbia–Vojislav Koštunica	62,987	12.87	13
Socialist Party of Serbia	27,563	5.63	6
G17 Plus–Miroljub Labus	24,511	5.01	5
Strength of Serbia Movement–Bogoljub Karić	23,600	4.82	5
Democratic Alternative–SDP–Dr. Nebojša Čović	14,944	3.05	–
Serbian Renewal Movement–Vuk Drašković	10,577	2.16	–
People's Democratic Party–Dr. Slobodan Vuksanović	6,467	1.32	–
New Serbia–Velimir Ilić	4,151	0.85	–
Pensioners' Party of Serbia–Radoslav Mitrović	2,672	0.55	–
Citizens' Group: Dunavski Venac Dr. Dragan Mladenović	2,327	0.48	–
People's Radical Party	2,211	0.45	–
Socialist People's Party–Branislav Ivković	1,702	0.35	–
Serbian People's Radical Party–Vladimir Stanojlović	1,297	0.27	–
Citizens' Group: Dragić Radovanović–Independent Candidate Belgrade	1,272	0.26	–
New Communist Party of Yugoslavia Dr. Branko Kitanović	1,011	0.21	–
Ravna Gora Movement D.M.	915	0.19	–
Social Democratic Union–Žarko Korać	894	0.18	–
Ecological Green Party–Vukosav Bojović	873	0.18	–
Roma Social Democratic Party of Serbia Rade Ćirić	710	0.15	–
Workers Party of Yugoslavia–Petar Veličković	704	0.14	–
Citizens' Group: Gavrilo Princip	699	0.14	–
Liberals of Belgrade–Rebeka Božović	658	0.13	–
Green Party EKO–Budimir Babić	584	0.12	–
Roma Democratic Party	550	0.11	–
Citizens' Group: Branko Ćopić–A Writer	501	0.10	–
Roma Union of Serbia–Stevanović Marko	435	0.09	–
Democratic Orthodox Party-Dr. Mihailo Petković	428	0.09	–
Citizens' Group: Tešić Mikica	424	0.09	–
Union of the Greens Dr. Marija Milutinović	387	0.08	–
Citizens' Group: For Truth, Justice, and a Better Life–R. Perović	292	0.06	–
Progressive Party–Progressives–Dr. Branislav Pavlović	235	0.05	–
For a Better Belgrade–Melita Šteković	221	0.05	–
Serbian Unity Party–Milorad Stojković Stenka	218	0.04	–
Free Democratic Party–DPS–Mr. Radoslav Stevanović Dosa	206	0.04	–
Citizens' Group: Association of Foreign Currency and Dinar Savers of Serbia and Montenegro (UDŠSCG)–Ivan B. Nedeljković	198	0.04	–
Democratic Reform European Party (DRES) Nebojša Mijušković	169	0.03	–
Citizens' Group: Toađer Branka	143	0.03	–
Total	489,374	100.00	90
Valid votes	489,374	97.70	
Invalid/blank votes	11,527	2.30	
Total votes	500,901	100.00	
Registered voters/turnout	1,444,307	34.68	

The Democratic Alternative list did not receive three per cent of the total vote and so fell below the electoral threshold.

==== Municipalities of Belgrade ====
Municipal assembly elections were held in sixteen of Belgrade's seventeen constituent municipalities. The exception was Barajevo, where a special off-year election had taken place in 2003.

The elections were generally a success for the Democratic Party, which finished first in most municipalities and ultimately attained the mayoralty in eleven. The Radicals won the mayor's offices in Zemun and Surčin, the Democratic Party of Serbia won the mayor's office in Lazarevac, and the mayoralties in Grocka and Sopot went to independent candidates.

===== Barajevo =====
There was no election for the Municipal Assembly of Barajevo in 2004. The previous election had taken place in 2002, and the next took place in 2006.

===== Čukarica =====
Results of the election for the Municipal Assembly of Čukarica:

Party	Votes	%	Seats
Democratic Party–Boris Tadić	13,939	28.67	14
Serbian Radical Party–Tomislav Nikolić	12,438	25.59	12
Democratic Alternative–Social Democratic Party–Dr. Nebojša Čović	6,726	13.84	7
Democratic Party of Serbia–Vojislav Koštunica	5,655	11.63	5
Strength of Serbia Movement–Bogoljub Karić	2,704	5.56	3
Socialist Party of Serbia–Dr. Rajko Srdić	2,452	5.04	2
G17 Plus–Miroljub Labus	1,620	3.33	2
Serbian Renewal Movement–Vuk Drašković	948	1.95	–
Citizens' Group: Da na celoj opštini Čukarica bude kao na Čukarici	696	1.43	–
Citizens' Group: My Čukarica	521	1.07	–
New Serbia–Velimir Ilić	320	0.66	–
People's Democratic Party–Dr. Slobodan Vuksanović	285	0.59	–
Roma Union of Serbia–Zoran Dimić	158	0.33	–
New Communist Party of Yugoslavia–Branislav Kitanović	149	0.31	–
Total	48,611	100.00	45
Valid votes	48,611	98.30	
Invalid/blank votes	839	1.70	
Total votes	49,450	100.00	
Registered voters/turnout	152,944	32.33	

Dragan Tešić of the Democratic Party was chosen as mayor after the election.

===== Grocka =====
Results of the election for the Municipal Assembly of Grocka:

Party	Votes	%	Seats
Serbian Radical Party–Tomislav Nikolić	4,394	21.41	8
Citizens' Group: Our Man–Blažo Stojanović	3,287	16.01	6
Democratic Party–Boris Tadić	2,474	12.05	5
Socialist Party of Serbia	2,185	10.65	4
Citizens' Group: Strength of the Citizens–Vladan Zarić	1,804	8.79	3
Democratic Party of Serbia–Vojislav Koštunica	1,369	6.67	2
New Serbia–Velimir Ilić	1,084	5.28	2
Serbian Renewal Movement–Dr. Vlada Pavlović	1,007	4.91	2
Strength of Serbia Movement–Bogoljub Karić	871	4.24	2
Social Democratic Party–Mihailo Barac	640	3.12	1
G17 Plus–Miroljub Labus	413	2.01	–
People's Democratic Party "Dr. Slobodan Vuksanović"	311	1.52	–
"Social Democratic Party"	212	1.03	–
Citizens' Group: Jugoslav Bogojević	112	0.55	–
Economic Strength of Serbia–Rajko Uzelac	99	0.48	–
Citizens' Association–Grocka	77	0.38	–
Citizens' Group: Miloš Lazović	62	0.30	–
Civic Alliance of Serbia–Goran Svilanović	58	0.28	–
Citizens' Group: Dejan Živković	50	0.24	–
Liberals of Serbia	17	0.08	–
Total	20,526	100.00	35
Valid votes	20,526	97.38	
Invalid/blank votes	553	2.62	
Total votes	21,079	100.00	
Registered voters/turnout	59,854	35.22	

Although the Radicals technically won a plurality victory, the election did not even come close to producing a clear winner, and the next four years saw several changes in the local government.

Blažo Stojanović, elected at the head of an independent list, was chosen as mayor after the election, in an alliance with the Democratic Party, the Democratic Party of Serbia, the Serbian Renewal Movement, the Strength of Serbia Movement, and the Social Democratic Party. The coalition fell apart in mid-2005, and local Radical Party leader Dragoljub Simonović became mayor at the head of a new governing alliance. In late 2005, Stojanović was able to return as mayor with a coalition including the Socialists, the Democratic Party of Serbia, the Serbian Renewal Movement, the Social Democratic Party, and Vladan Zarić's list. The Socialists and the Democratic Party withdrew their support in mid-2007, and Stojanović created a new coalition including the Radicals and Strength of Serbia Movement. One member of Strength of Serbia defected to the opposition in December 2007, leading to a period of confusion in which both the government and opposition claimed to control a majority of seats. This lasted until new local elections took place in May 2008.

===== Lazarevac =====
Results of the election for the Municipal Assembly of Lazarevac:

Party	Votes	%	Seats
Democratic Party–Boris Tadić	3,450	19.11	13
Democratic Party of Serbia–Dr. Vojislav Koštunica	3,203	17.74	12
Serbian Radical Party–Tomislav Nikolić	2,230	12.35	8
Socialist Party of Serbia–Slavoljub Pavlović Kolubarac	2,134	11.82	8
Citizens' Group: Milanović Slobodan	1,467	8.13	6
Serbian Renewal Movement–Dr. Vuk Drašković	1,179	6.53	4
G17 Plus–Miroljub Labus	1,171	6.49	4
Strength of Serbia Movement–Bogoljub Karić	810	4.49	3
New Serbia–Velimir Ilić	679	3.76	3
Democratic Alternative–Social Democratic Party–Dr. Nebojša Čović	409	2.27	–
Citizens' Group: Marinković Dragan Gane	275	1.52	–
Citizens' Group: Milojko Radonjić	224	1.24	–
People's Democratic Party–Dr. Slobodan Vuksanović	193	1.07	–
Citizens' Group: Jeremić Mile Major	119	0.66	–
Citizens' Group: Milun Stanojević	105	0.58	–
Citizens' Group: Borivoje Petrović	69	0.38	–
Citizens' Group: Milena Gajić	64	0.35	–
Citizens' Group: Goran Đorđević	60	0.33	–
Citizens' Group: Stanimirović Zoran Žuća	60	0.33	–
New Roma Democratic Party	55	0.30	–
Democratic Orthodox Party-Dr. Mihailo Petković	53	0.29	–
NKPJ–Branislav Kitanović	42	0.23	–
Total	18,051	100.00	61
Valid votes	18,051	96.22	
Invalid/blank votes	710	3.78	
Total votes	18,761	100.00	
Registered voters/turnout	48,516	38.67	

The election did not produce a clear winner. Branko Borić of the Democratic Party of Serbia was subsequently chosen as mayor.

===== Mladenovac =====
Results of the election for the Municipal Assembly of Mladenovac:

Party	Votes	%	Seats
Democratic Party–Boris Tadić	3,184	20.62	12
Serbian Radical Party–Tomislav Nikolić	3,046	19.73	12
Democratic Party of Serbia–Vojislav Koštunica	1,813	11.74	7
New Serbia–Velimir Ilić	1,704	11.04	7
Socialist Party of Serbia–Tihomir Tomićević	1,230	7.97	5
Strength of Serbia Movement–Bogoljub Karić	942	6.10	4
Citizens' Group: Alliance for the Revival of Mladenovac–Predrag Čokić	883	5.72	3
Citizens' Group: United for Mladenovac	730	4.73	3
G17 Plus–Miroljub Labus	537	3.48	2
Socialist People's Party–Vladan Gajić	377	2.44	–
Serbian Renewal Movement–Vuk Drašković	353	2.29	–
International Party "Roma of Serbia"	142	0.92	–
League of Communists of Yugoslavia	140	0.91	–
Citizens' Group: For Mladenovac–Radosav Ivanović Džamba	113	0.73	–
People's Democratic Party–Dr. Slobodan Vuksanović	105	0.68	–
Roma Congress Party–Miroslav Milanović	94	0.61	–
Union of the Greens–Petar Stojanović	47	0.30	–
Total	15,440	100.00	55
Valid votes	15,440	96.60	
Invalid/blank votes	544	3.40	
Total votes	15,984	100.00	
Registered voters/turnout	45,115	35.43	

Incumbent mayor Zoran Kostić of the Democratic Party was confirmed for another term in office after the election. The Democratic Party formed an administration with the Democratic Party of Serbia, G17 Plus, the Strength of Serbia Movement, and the Alliance for the Revival of Mladenovac.

===== New Belgrade =====
Results of the election for the Municipal Assembly of New Belgrade:

Party	Votes	%	Seats
Democratic Party–Boris Tadić	28,669	38.37	28
Serbian Radical Party–Tomislav Nikolić	17,690	23.68	17
Democratic Party of Serbia–Vojislav Koštunica	8,597	11.51	8
G17 Plus–Miroljub Labus	6,109	8.18	6
Socialist Party of Serbia	4,658	6.23	5
Strength of Serbia Movement–Bogoljub Karić	3,512	4.70	3
Democratic Alternative–Social Democratic Party–Dr. Nebojša Čović	1,537	2.06	–
Movement for New Belgrade–SPO–LS	855	1.14	–
Pensioners' Party of Serbia–Milomir Obradović	695	0.93	–
People's Democratic Party–Dr. Slobodan Vuksanović	522	0.70	–
For a Civic Serbia–Goran Svilanović (GSS–SDU)	424	0.57	–
New Serbia–Velimir Ilić	314	0.42	–
Alliance of Communists of Yugoslavia and Serbia	269	0.36	–
Dragić Radovanović, Independent Candidate Citizens' Group Belgrade	257	0.34	–
New Communist Party of Yugoslavia–Branislav Kitanović	203	0.27	–
Roma Unity Party	157	0.21	–
Socialist People's Party–Branka Cvetković	145	0.19	–
Citizens' Group: For a Better Belgrade–Melita Šteković	98	0.13	–
Total	74,711	100.00	67
Valid votes	74,711	98.41	
Invalid/blank votes	1,210	1.59	
Total votes	75,921	100.00	
Registered voters/turnout	206,470	36.77	

Incumbent mayor Željko Ožegović of the Democratic Party (DS) was confirmed for another term in office after the election, with the support of thirty-eight delegates. Maja Videnović appeared in the eighth position on the DS's list and was automatically elected. Nenad Milenković was also one of the DS candidates elected.

Parliamentarian Marko Đurišić received the largely honorary sixty-seventh and final position on the DS list and was not given a mandate.

===== Obrenovac =====
Results of the election for the Municipal Assembly of Obrenovac:

Party	Votes	%	Seats
Serbian Radical Party–Tomislav Nikolić	4,816	22.92	14
Democratic Party–Boris Tadić	4,412	20.99	13
Socialist Party of Serbia	2,584	12.30	8
Serbian Renewal Movement–New Serbia	2,186	10.40	6
Citizens' Association of Obrenovac	1,397	6.65	4
Democratic Party of Serbia–Vojislav Koštunica	1,250	5.95	4
G17 Plus–Miroljub Labus	954	4.54	3
Strength of Serbia Movement–Bogoljub Karić	936	4.45	3
DHS–Liberals of Serbia–Dr. Vladan Batić	532	2.53	–
People's Democratic Party–Dr. S. Vuksanović	528	2.51	–
Citizens' Group: To Victory–Miladin Tošić	441	2.10	–
Citizens' Group: All for a Better and Fairer Obrenovac - And Right Away–G.V.	268	1.28	–
DPS Social Democracy–Dr. Vuk Obradović	259	1.23	–
New Communist Party of Yugoslavia	168	0.80	–
Party of Serbian Unity	129	0.61	–
Citizens' Group: Dudovi	56	0.27	–
Roma Democratic Party	51	0.24	–
New Roma Democratic Party of Serbia Z.J. Pipi	48	0.23	–
Total	21,015	100.00	55
Valid votes	21,015	97.01	
Invalid/blank votes	647	2.99	
Total votes	21,662	100.00	
Registered voters/turnout	60,116	36.03	

Although the Radical Party technically won the election, it could not command a majority of seats in the assembly. Nebojša Ćeran of the Democratic Party was selected as mayor.

===== Palilula =====
Results of the election for the Municipal Assembly of Palilula:

Party	Votes	%	Seats
Democratic Party–Boris Tadić	12,892	28.62	17
Serbian Radical Party–Tomislav Nikolić	10,883	24.16	15
Democratic Party of Serbia–Vojislav Koštunica	4,804	10.66	6
G17 Plus–Miroljub Labus	4,405	9.78	6
Strength of Serbia Movement–Bogoljub Karić	2,539	5.64	3
Citizens' Group: Dunavski Venac	2,457	5.45	3
Socialist Party of Serbia	2,030	4.51	3
Serbian Renewal Movement–Vuk Drašković	1,568	3.48	2
Democratic Alternative–Social Democratic Party–Dr. Nebojša Čović	1,126	2.50	–
People's Democratic Party–Dr. Slobodan Vuksanović	592	1.31	–
Citizens' Group: For Palilula	338	0.75	–
People's Radical Party	295	0.65	–
New Serbia–Velimir Ilić	241	0.53	–
Roma Social Democratic Party of Serbia	228	0.51	–
Ecological Green Party	170	0.38	–
Workers Party of Yugoslavia	127	0.28	–
Roma Democratic Party	121	0.27	–
New Communist Party of Yugoslavia	99	0.22	–
Citizens' Group	85	0.19	–
Free Democratic Party	52	0.12	–
Total	45,052	100.00	55
Valid votes	45,052	97.76	
Invalid/blank votes	1,032	2.24	
Total votes	46,084	100.00	
Registered voters/turnout	142,631	32.31	

Danilo Bašić of the Democratic Party was chosen as mayor after the election.

===== Rakovica =====
Results of the election for the Municipal Assembly of Rakovica:

Party	Votes	%	Seats
Democratic Party–Boris Tadić	9,570	31.96	20
Serbian Radical Party–Tomislav Nikolić	8,453	28.23	18
Democratic Party of Serbia–Vojislav Koštunica	4,096	13.68	8
Strength of Serbia Movement–Bogoljub Karić	2,189	7.31	5
Socialist Party of Serbia–Duśan Đaković	1,536	5.13	3
G17 Plus–Miroljub Labus	1,456	4.86	3
Coalition for Rakovica Dr. Slobodan Vuksanović–People's Democratic Party, Serbian Renewal Movement–Vuk Drašković, Social Democracy, Roma Union of Serbia, Citizens' Association of Rakovica Straževica, Resnik Residents' Association "General Agricultural Co-operative Resnik"	1,020	3.41	2
Democratic Alternative–Social Democratic Party–Dr. Nebojša Čović	999	3.34	2
New Serbia–Velimir Ilić	275	0.92	–
Alliance of Communists of Yugoslavia and Serbia	162	0.54	–
Union of the Greens–Dr. Marija Milutinović	130	0.43	–
Socialist People's Party–Sava Ilić	62	0.21	–
Total	29,948	100.00	61
Valid votes	29,948	98.41	
Invalid/blank votes	485	1.59	
Total votes	30,433	100.00	
Registered voters/turnout	91,642	33.21	

Bojan Milić of the Democratic Party was chosen as mayor after the election.

===== Savski Venac =====
Results of the election for the Municipal Assembly of Savski Venac:

Party	Votes	%	Seats
Democratic Party–Boris Tadić	5,962	38.00	16
Serbian Radical Party–Tomislav Nikolić	2,935	18.71	8
Democratic Party of Serbia–Vojislav Koštunica	2,300	14.66	6
Strength of Serbia Movement–Bogoljub Karić	835	5.32	2
Socialist Party of Serbia	752	4.79	2
G17 Plus–Miroljub Labus	703	4.48	2
Democratic Alternative–Social Democratic Party–Dr. Nebojša Čović	485	3.09	1
League for Savski Venac–Civic Initiative Mr. Tatjana Janić	431	2.75	–
Serbian Renewal Movement–Dr. Mirjana Panić	284	1.81	–
Civic Initiative Against Corruption–Dr. R.A. Rajs	280	1.78	–
Citizens' Group: For Savski Venac–Krstić Zdravko	259	1.65	–
People's Democratic Party–Dr. Slobodan Vuksanović	150	0.96	–
Citizens' Group: Gavrilo Princip	119	0.76	–
New Serbia–Velimir Ilić	90	0.57	–
Citizens' Group: Cile – Senjak	82	0.52	–
Progressive Party–Progressives	21	0.13	–
Total	15,688	100.00	37
Valid votes	15,688	98.33	
Invalid/blank votes	266	1.67	
Total votes	15,954	100.00	
Registered voters/turnout	43,447	36.72	

Tomislav Đorđević of the Democratic Party was selected as mayor after the election. A member of the Democratic Party of Serbia was chosen as deputy mayor.

===== Sopot =====
Results of the election for the Municipal Assembly of Sopot:

Party	Votes	%	Seats
Citizens' Group: For the Municipality of Sopot–Živorad – Žika Milosavljević	2,751	39.05	14
Democratic Party–Boris Tadić	1,205	17.11	6
Serbian Radical Party–Tomislav Nikolić	1,145	16.25	6
For a Democratic Municipality–DSS Vojislav Koštunica–SPO Vuk Drašković	573	8.13	3
Socialist Party of Serbia Veroljub – Verko Sinđelić	271	3.85	2
Democratic Alternative–Dr. Nebojša Čović	250	3.55	1
Strength of Serbia Movement–Bogoljub Karić	231	3.28	1
Citizens' Group For the Development of the Municipality of Sopot	198	2.81	–
Citizens' Group For Youth and Progress in the Municipality of Sopot	169	2.40	–
G17 Plus–Miroljub Labus	123	1.75	–
New Serbia–Velimir Ilić	94	1.33	–
New Communist Party of Yugoslavia–Branko Kitanović	34	0.48	–
Total	7,044	100.00	33
Valid votes	7,044	96.74	
Invalid/blank votes	237	3.26	
Total votes	7,281	100.00	
Registered voters/turnout	16,799	43.34	

Incumbent mayor Živorad Milosavljević of the For the Municipality of Sopot list was confirmed for another term in office after the election.

===== Stari Grad =====
Results of the election for the Municipal Assembly of Stari Grad:

Party	Votes	%	Seats
Democratic Party–Boris Tadić	9,963	43.54	27
Democratic Party of Serbia–Vojislav Koštunica	3,823	16.71	11
Serbian Radical Party–Tomislav Nikolić	3,324	14.53	9
G17 Plus–Miroljub Labus	1,620	7.08	5
Strength of Serbia Movement–Bogoljub Karić	876	3.83	2
Socialist Party of Serbia	744	3.25	2
Democratic Alternative–Social Democratic Party–Dr. Nebojša Čović	530	2.32	–
Citizens' Group: Neighbours for Stari Grad–Predrag Rajčević	448	1.96	–
Serbian Renewal Movement–Dr. Jovan Novak	405	1.77	–
Civic Alliance of Serbia–Goran Svilanović	380	1.66	–
People's Democratic Party–Dr. Slobodan Vuksanović	362	1.58	–
New Serbia–Velimir Ilić	124	0.54	–
Social Democracy–Dr. Vuk Obradović	80	0.35	–
New Communist Party of Yugoslavia–Branko Kitanović	72	0.31	–
Socialist People's Party–Branislav Ivković	65	0.28	–
Democratic Reform European Party–Nebojša Mijušković	35	0.15	–
Citizens' Group: Association of Foreign Currency and Dinar Savers of Serbia and Montenegro (UDŠSCG)–Ivan B. Nedeljković	29	0.13	–
Total	22,880	100.00	56
Valid votes	22,800	97.97	
Invalid/blank votes	473	2.03	
Total votes	23,273	100.00	
Registered voters/turnout	59,873	38.87	

Incumbent mayor Mirjana Božidarević of the Democratic Party was confirmed for another term in office after the election. Nemanja Šarović was elected from the first position on the Radical Party's list.

===== Surčin =====
Results of the election for the Municipal Assembly of Surčin:

Party	Votes	%	Seats
Serbian Radical Party–Tomislav Nikolić	4,292	42.80	9
Democratic Party–Boris Tadić	2,257	22.51	5
Strength of Serbia Movement–Bogoljub Karić	1,022	10.19	2
Democratic Party of Serbia–Vojislav Koštunica	682	6.80	1
Socialist Party of Serbia	474	4.73	1
Democratic Alternative–Social Democratic Party–Dr. Nebojša Čović	316	3.15	1
Serbian Renewal Movement–Vuk Drašković	304	3.03	–
G17 Plus–Miroljub Labus	191	1.90	–
Citizens' Group: For Surčin	180	1.80	–
Citizens' Group: For Lepši and Donji Srem	110	1.10	–
New Serbia–Velimir Ilić	100	1.00	–
Citizens' Group: "Vinogradska–Donji Srem	61	0.61	–
Citizens' Group: Something New	38	0.38	–
Total	10,027	100.00	19
Valid votes	10,027	97.09	
Invalid/blank votes	300	2.91	
Total votes	10,327	100.00	
Registered voters/turnout	30,625	33.72	

Rajko Matović of the Radical Party was chosen as mayor after the election. After a period of political upheaval, Vojislav Janošević of the Democratic Party became mayor in November 2005.

===== Voždovac =====
Results of the election for the Municipal Assembly of Voždovac:

Party	Votes	%	Seats
Democratic Party–Boris Tadić	14,814	32.90	20
Serbian Radical Party–Tomislav Nikolić	11,017	24.46	15
Democratic Party of Serbia–Vojislav Koštunica	6,905	15.33	10
Strength of Serbia Movement–Bogoljub Karić	2,883	6.40	4
G17 Plus–Miroljub Labus	2,526	5.61	4
Socialist Party of Serbia	2,462	5.47	3
Democratic Alternative–Social Democratic Party–Dr. Nebojša Čović	1,110	2.46	–
Serbian Renewal Movement–Vuk Drašković	1,047	2.32	–
People's Democratic Party–Dr. Slobodan Vuksanović	556	1.23	–
People's Radical Party–Duško Jelić	291	0.65	–
Civic Alliance of Serbia–Social Democratic Union–Goran Svilanović	255	0.57	–
New Serbia–Velimir Ilić	237	0.53	–
Social Democracy–Dr. Vuk Obradović	184	0.41	–
Liberals of Serbia	129	0.29	–
Union of the Greens–Dr. Marija Milutinović	128	0.28	–
New Communist Party of Yugoslavia–Branislav Kitanović	118	0.26	–
International Party "Roma" of Serbia	101	0.22	–
Socialist People's Party–Ivana Petrović	86	0.19	–
Democratic Orthodox Party-Dr. Mihailo Petković	81	0.18	–
Labour Party of Serbia–Dragan Ružić Kanja	54	0.12	–
Citizens' Group: Association of Foreign Currency and Dinar Savers of Serbia and Montenegro (UDŠSCG)–Ivan B. Nedeljković	50	0.11	–
Total	45,034	100.00	56
Valid votes	45,034	97.72	
Invalid/blank votes	1,049	2.28	
Total votes	46,083	100.00	
Registered voters/turnout	140,907	32.70	

Goran Lukačević of the Democratic Party was chosen as mayor after the election.

===== Vračar =====
Results of the election for the Municipal Assembly of Vračar:

Party	Votes	%	Seats
Democratic Party–Boris Tadić	10,953	46.79	30
Democratic Party of Serbia–Vojislav Koštunica	3,839	16.40	10
Serbian Radical Party–Tomislav Nikolić	3,125	13.35	9
G17 Plus–Miroljub Labus	1,353	5.78	4
Socialist Party of Serbia	1,134	4.84	3
Strength of Serbia Movement–Bogoljub Karić	881	3.76	2
Democratic Alternative–Social Democratic Party–Dr. Nebojša Čović	793	3.39	2
Serbian Renewal Movement–People's Democratic Party–New Serbia–Slobodan Vuksanović–Vuk Drašković	639	2.73	–
Civic Alliance of Serbia–Goran Svilanović	357	1.53	–
Socialist People's Party–Dr. Zlata Ćetković	144	0.62	–
Union of the Greens–Dr. Marija Milutinović	131	0.56	–
Association of Foreign Currency and Dinar Savers of Serbia and Montenegro (UDŠSCG)–Ivan B. Nedeljković	59	0.25	–
Total	23,408	100.00	60
Valid votes	23,408	98.42	
Invalid/blank votes	375	1.58	
Total votes	23,783	100.00	
Registered voters/turnout	61,756	38.51	

Incumbent mayor Milena Milošević of the Democratic Party was confirmed for another term in office after the election. Her deputy mayor was a member of the Democratic Party of Serbia. Milošević was replaced by Branimir Kuzmanović on 13 June 2006.

Future parliamentarian Konstantin Samofalov appeared in the fifty-first position on the Democratic Party's list. He did not receive a mandate.

===== Zemun =====
Results of the election for the Municipal Assembly of Zemun:

Party	Votes	%	Seats
Serbian Radical Party–Tomislav Nikolić	18,086	40.16	26
Democratic Party–Boris Tadić	13,360	29.67	19
Democratic Party of Serbia–Vojislav Koštunica	4,663	10.36	7
Strength of Serbia Movement–Bogoljub Karić	2,462	5.47	3
Socialist Party of Serbia	1,628	3.62	2
G17 Plus–Miroljub Labus	1,153	2.56	–
Serbian Renewal Movement–Dr. Ljubiša Popović	957	2.13	–
Democratic Alternative–Social Democratic Party–Dr. Nebojša Čović	887	1.97	–
New Serbia–People's Democratic Party–Velimir Ilić–Dr. Slobodan Vuksanović	370	0.82	–
Pensioners' Party of Serbia	366	0.81	–
People's Radical Party	285	0.63	–
Workers Party of Yugoslavia	212	0.47	–
Municipal Organization of Disabled People of Zemun	204	0.45	–
Roma Democratic Party–Sevđedin Haliti Sevđa	158	0.35	–
New Communist Party of Yugoslavia–Branislav Kitanović	104	0.23	–
Free Democratic Party–Mr. Radoslav Stevanović Dosa	71	0.16	–
Progressive Party–Dragan Vulin	65	0.14	–
Total	45,031	100.00	57
Valid votes	45,031	98.34	
Invalid/blank votes	759	1.66	
Total votes	45,790	100.00	
Registered voters/turnout	137,769	33.24	

Gordana Pop Lazić of the Radical Party was chosen as mayor after the election, with support from the Socialists and the Strength of Serbia Movement. Parliamentarian Vjerica Radeta was elected as a Radical Party delegate.

Andreja Mladenović was elected from the second position on the Democratic Party of Serbia list and served in opposition.

===== Zvezdara =====
Results of the election for the Municipal Assembly of Zvezdara:

Party	Votes	%	Seats
Democratic Party–Boris Tadić	14,354	35.50	20
Serbian Radical Party–T. Nikolić	9,320	23.05	13
Democratic Party of Serbia–Dr. V. Koštunica	5,593	13.83	8
Strength of Serbia Movement–B. Karić	2,796	6.91	4
G17 Plus–Miroljub Labus	2,031	5.02	3
Socialist Party of Serbia	1,956	4.84	3
Democratic Alternative–Social Democratic Party–Dr. N. Čović	1,336	3.30	2
Serbian Renewal Movement–Zvezdara	1,197	2.96	–
People's Radical Party	419	1.04	–
Civic Alliance of Serbia–G. Svilanović	374	0.92	–
People's Democratic Party–Dr. S. Vuksanović	356	0.88	–
New Serbia–Velimir - Velja Ilić	316	0.78	–
New Communist Party of Yugoslavia–B. Kitanović	148	0.37	–
Citizens' Group: Mikica Tešić	137	0.34	–
Party "Serbian Unity"–D. Rašković	106	0.26	–
Total	40,439	100.00	53
Valid votes	40,439	98.06	
Invalid/blank votes	800	1.94	
Total votes	41,239	100.00	
Registered voters/turnout	125,534	32.85	

Milan Popović of the Democratic Party was chosen as mayor after the election. Ljubiša Stojmirović of the Radical Party became mayor on 18 February 2005; Popović returned to office on 28 June of the same year.

Aleksandra Tomić appeared in the eighth position on the Democratic Party of Serbia's list. She did not initially receive a seat in the assembly but was given a mandate as the replacement for another party member on 18 February 2005. She was appointed to the municipal council on 28 June 2005 and remained in this role until 2008.

=== Vojvodina ===
==== North Bačka District ====
Local elections were held in all three municipalities in the North Bačka District, and the Alliance of Vojvodina Hungarians won the mayoralties in all three jurisdictions. In Subotica, the party won a narrow victory over the Democratic Party; in the two other municipalities, candidates of the party won in local alliances with the Democrats.

===== Subotica =====
2004 Municipality of Subotica local election: Mayor of Subotica
Candidate	Party	First round		Second round	
Candidate	Party	Votes	%	Votes	%
Géza Kucsera (incumbent)	Alliance of Vojvodina Hungarians	16,667	31.89	25,018	50.11
Oliver Dulić	Democratic Party–Boris Tadić	8,474	16.21	24,905	49.89
Mirko Bajić	Coalition: Subotica Our City	6,878	13.16		
Radmilo Todosijević	Serbian Radical Party–Tomislav Nikolić	5,129	9.81		
József Miskolczi	Citizens' Group	3,322	6.36		
Blaško Gabrić	Citizens' Group: Da Subotici Svane	3,216	6.15		
Tomislav Stantić	G17 Plus	3,013	5.76		
Aleksandar Evetović	Strength of Serbia Movement	1,798	3.44		
Csaba Sepsey	Democratic Party of Vojvodina Hungarians	1,534	2.93		
Edit Stevanović	Coalition: "Together for Vojvodina–Nenad Čanak"	1,192	2.28		
Srećko Novaković	Democratic Party of Serbia	1,043	2.00		
Total		52,266	100.00	49,923	100.00
Valid votes		52,266	98.42	49,923	97.13
Invalid/blank votes		841	1.58	1,477	2.87
Total votes		53,107	100.00	51,400	100.00
Registered voters/turnout		127,986	41.49	127,986	40.16

Results of the election for the Municipal Assembly of Subotica:

Party	Votes	%	Seats
Alliance of Vojvodina Hungarians	11,158	21.53	16
Democratic Party–Boris Tadić	8,257	15.93	12
Serbian Radical Party–Tomislav Nikolić	6,414	12.38	9
Subotica Our City–Mirko Bajić (Reformists of Vojvodina, Social Democratic Party, People's Democratic Party, Democratic Alternative)	3,477	6.71	5
Democratic Alliance of Croats in Vojvodina–Martin Bačić	3,351	6.47	5
"Together for Vojvodina–Nenad Čanak"	2,775	5.35	4
G17 Plus–Miroljub Labus	2,633	5.08	4
Democratic Party of Vojvodina Hungarians–Ágoston András	2,416	4.66	3
Mogućnost–József Miskolczi	2,371	4.57	3
"Coalition: Da Subotici Svane"–Blaško Gabrić (Ecological Green Party, League of Communists of Yugoslavia in Serbia)	1,945	3.75	3
Strength of Serbia Movement–Bogoljub Karić	1,793	3.46	3
Democratic Party of Serbia–Dr. Vojislav Koštunica	1,115	2.15	–
Bunjevac Party–Dipl. Ing. Nikola Babić	767	1.48	–
"Coalition: Unity for Subotica"–Slobodan Vojinović (Citizens' Group, Socialist Party of Serbia, New Serbia, Party of Serbian Progress, Socialist People's Party)	765	1.48	–
"Citizens' Group: Penzioneri i Borci"–Jurković Bela	668	1.29	–
Croatian Bunjevac-Šokac Party, Blaško Temunović	581	1.12	–
Defence of Subotica–Branči	461	0.89	–
Citizens' Group: Ker–Mirko Gabrić Pićora	357	0.69	–
Citizens' Group: Movement for Peace and Civic Solidarity–Dragan Dašić	219	0.42	–
Citizens' Group: 67 Municipality of Subotica (GG 67)	154	0.30	–
Citizens' Group: Višnjevac Slobodan Žužić	149	0.29	–
Total	51,826	100.00	67
Valid votes	51,826	97.66	
Invalid/blank votes	1,241	2.34	
Total votes	53,067	100.00	
Registered voters/turnout	127,986	41.46	

Imre Kern was re-elected to the assembly from the second position on the Alliance of Vojvodina Hungarians list.

===== Bačka Topola =====
2004 Municipality of Bačka Topola local election: Mayor of Bačka Topola
Candidate	Party	First round		Second round	
Candidate	Party	Votes	%	Votes	%
Attila Bábi (incumbent)	Alliance of Vojvodina Hungarians–Democratic Party–Boris Tadić	4,387	34.64	6,151	53.07
János Hadzsy	Citizens' Group: Pro Commune	3,039	24.00	5,440	46.93
Bojan Mandić	Citizens' Group: Movement for Our Municipality	2,254	17.80		
Milan Mandić	G17 Plus	1,078	8.51		
Dr. Ferenc Major	Coalition: "Together for Vojvodina–Nenad Čanak"	986	7.79		
András Turcsányi	Democratic Fellowship of Vojvodina Hungarians	468	3.70		
Miksa Beer	Citizens' Group: For Miksa Beer	452	3.57		
Total		12,664	100.00	11,591	100.00
Valid votes		12,664	96.78	11,591	97.31
Invalid/blank votes		421	3.22	320	2.69
Total votes		13,085	100.00	11,911	100.00
Registered voters/turnout		31,612	41.39	31,612	37.68

Results of the election for the Municipal Assembly of Bačka Topola:

Party	Votes	%	Seats
Alliance of Vojvodina Hungarians–Sándor Egeresi	4,223	33.03	15
Serbian Radical Party–Tomislav Nikolić	1,602	12.53	6
Citizens' Group: Pro Commune for Bačka Topola–János Hadzsy	1,144	8.95	4
Democratic Party–Boris Tadić	1,117	8.74	4
Coalition: "Together for Vojvodina–Nenad Čanak"	892	6.98	3
G17 Plus–Miroljub Labus	785	6.14	3
Citizens' Group: "Movement for Our Municipality"–Bojan Mandić	745	5.83	2
Socialist Party of Serbia	475	3.71	2
Democratic Party of Vojvodina Hungarians–András Ágoston	473	3.70	2
Democratic Fellowship of Vojvodina Hungarians–Dr. Sándor Páll	347	2.71	–
Strength of Serbia Movement Bogoljub Karić	312	2.44	–
Political Organization for Democratic Change "New Serbia"–Sándor Lovas	219	1.71	–
Serbian Renewal Movement–Social Democracy–People's Democratic Party–Milorad Savić-Mijad	198	1.55	–
Proposal of the Candidate of the Citizens' Group Stara Moravica	178	1.39	–
Proposal of the Candidate of the Citizens' Group Njegoševo	77	0.60	–
Total	12,787	100.00	41
Valid votes	12,787	97.48	
Invalid/blank votes	330	2.52	
Total votes	13,117	100.00	
Registered voters/turnout	31,612	41.49	

Future parliamentarian Árpád Fremond appeared on the list of the Alliance of Vojvodina Hungarians, although he was not awarded a mandate on this occasion.

===== Mali Iđoš =====
2004 Municipality of Mali Iđoš local election: Mayor of Mali Iđoš
Candidate	Party	First round		Second round	
Candidate	Party	Votes	%	Votes	%
István Szűgyi (incumbent)	For a European Mali Iđoš – Coalition: Alliance of Vojvodina Hungarians (SVM) and Democratic Party (DS)	1,561	38.39	2,291	62.94
Veselin Vušurović	"Socialist Party of Serbia–Slobodan Milošević"	449	11.04	1,349	37.06
Dragan Kaluđerović Guto	Serbian Radical Party	430	10.58		
Mihály Csordás	G17 Plus	391	9.62		
Goran Bulatović	Citizens' Group: Mali Iđoš, Lovćenac, Feketić	360	8.85		
Dr. István Biró	Social Democratic Party–Reformists of Vojvodina	330	8.12		
Miodrag Strugar	Strength of Serbia Movement Bogoljub Karić	236	5.80		
Slavko Rađenović	Social Democracy Dr. Vuk Obradović	155	3.81		
Predrag Lubarda	Democratic Party of Serbia–Vojislav Koštunica	154	3.79		
Total		4,066	100.00	3,640	100.00
Source: The first round totals are preliminary.

Results of the election for the Municipal Assembly of Mali Iđoš:

Party	Votes	%	Seats
Alliance of Vojvodina Hungarians–For the Municipality of Mali Iđoš–Pál Károly	1,285	31.63	9
Citizens' Group: Farmers Association of the Municipality of Mali Iđoš–Bači Gabor	563	13.86	4
Serbian Radical Party–Tomislav Nikolić	513	12.63	3
"Socialist Party of Serbia–Slobodan Milošević"–Petar Pejović	336	8.27	2
Democratic Party–Boris Tadić	265	6.52	2
"Strength of Serbia Movement" Bogoljub Karić	265	6.52	2
G17 Plus–Miroljub Labus	203	5.00	1
Democratic Party of Serbia–Vojislav Koštunica	194	4.77	1
Democratic Party of Vojvodina Hungarians–András Ágoston	151	3.72	1
Citizens' Group: Independent Candidate for the Assembly–Žadanji Peter	125	3.08	–
Coalition: Social Democracy Dr. Vuk Obradović, Social Democratic Party and Reformists of Vojvodina Mile Isakov–Rađenović Slavko	88	2.17	–
Serbian Renewal Movement–Medić Nebojša	75	1.85	–
Total	4,063	100.00	25
Valid votes	4,063	97.25	
Invalid/blank votes	115	2.75	
Total votes	4,178	100.00	
Registered voters/turnout	10,674	39.14	

==== South Bačka District ====
Elections were held in the one city (Novi Sad) and all eleven separate municipalities in the South Bačka District.

The City of Novi Sad comprises two municipalities (the City municipality of Novi Sad and Petrovaradin), although their powers are very limited relative to the city government. Unlike Belgrade, Niš, and Vranje, Novi Sad does not have directly elected municipal assemblies.

The Radical Party performed unexpectedly well in South Bačka, narrowly winning the mayoral contest in Novi Sad and also winning the mayoralties of five other municipalities. The Democratic Party and G17 won two mayoral contests apiece, a candidate of the People's Democratic Party won in Bečej, and independent candidate Branko Gajin won in Srbobran.

===== Novi Sad =====
2004 City of Novi Sad local election: Mayor of Novi Sad
Candidate	Party	First round		Second round	
Candidate	Party	Votes	%	Votes	%
Maja Gojković	Serbian Radical Party	44,013	42.65	60,235	50.29
Borislav Novaković (incumbent)	Democratic Party	34,300	33.24	59,540	49.71
Branislav Pomoriški	Together for Vojvodina	8,450	8.19		
Đorđe Bašić	Strength of Serbia Movement	5,243	5.08		
Dejan Mikavica	Democratic Party of Serbia	3,942	3.82		
Miodrag Isakov	Serbian Renewal Movement–Reformists of Vojvodina	3,556	3.45		
Miloš Tomić	G17 Plus	2,171	2.10		
Branislav Švonja	Community of Serbs of Croatia and Bosnia and Herzegovina	894	0.87		
Zoran Stojanović	New Serbia	628	0.61		
Total		103,197	100.00	119,775	100.00

Results of the election for the City Assembly of Novi Sad:

Party	Votes	%	Seats
Serbian Radical Party–Tomislav Nikolić	35,466	36.09	34
Democratic Party–Boris Tadić	25,772	26.22	27
"Together for Vojvodina" (League of Social Democrats of Vojvodina, Democratic Vojvodina, Vojvodinian Movement, Vojvodina Union–Vojvodina My Home, Union of Socialists of Vojvodina)–Mr. Branislav Pomoriški	8,999	9.16	9
Democratic Party of Serbia–Dr. Vojislav Koštunica	4,946	5.03	5
Citizens' Groups (ten different lists)	4,481	4.56	–
Socialist Party of Serbia–Novi Sad	3,612	3.68	3
G17 Plus, Miroljub Labus	3,392	3.45	3
"Clean Hands of Novi Sad–SPO–RV–Otpor" Miodrag Mile Isakov–Slobodan Živkucin	2,949	3.00	–
Strength of Serbia Movement–Bogoljub Karić	2,886	2.94	–
SNP Svetozar Miletić–People's Democratic Party Dr. Slobodan Vuksanović	1,333	1.36	–
Democratic Alternative–Dr. Nebojša Čović	1,037	1.06	–
People's Party–Milan Paroški	801	0.82	–
Democratic Party of Vojvodina Hungarians–Ágoston András	731	0.74	–
New Serbia–Dr. Zoran Stojanović	379	0.39	–
Association of Serbs of Vojvodina–Dušan Salatić	342	0.35	–
Democratic Alliance of Croats in Vojvodina	257	0.26	–
To Live Normally LS, DHSS, Patriotic Party of the Diaspora	205	0.21	–
Socialist People's Party–Prof. Dr. Branislav Ivković	168	0.17	–
New Communist Party of Yugoslavia Branko Kitanović	163	0.17	–
Ravna Gora Movement D.M.	149	0.15	–
Party of Serbian Unity	134	0.14	–
New Democratic Party of Roma of Serbia–Lazar Dimić	76	0.08	–
Total	98,278	100.00	81
Valid votes	98,278	98.44	
Invalid/blank votes	1,562	1.56	
Total votes	99,840	100.00	
Registered voters/turnout	266,806	37.42	

The Radicals attained a working majority in the assembly with the support of the Socialists and the Democratic Party of Serbia (whose delegates aligned themselves with the Radicals over the objections of the party's leadership).

Former mayor Milorad Mirčić, who had been defeated in 2000, was re-elected to the assembly after receiving the seventh position on the Radical Party's list. Future parliamentarian Nada Lazić, a member of the League of Social Democrats of Vojvodina, was elected from the third position on the Together for Vojvodina list.

===== Bač =====
2004 Municipality of Bač local election: Mayor of Bač
Candidate	Party	First round		Second round	
Candidate	Party	Votes	%	Votes	%
Tomislav Bogunović (incumbent)	Democratic Party			4,212	52.97
Milenko Babić	For the Revival of the Municipality of Bač			3,740	47.03
Miloš Vuković	Democratic Party of Serbia				
Dragan Medić	Serbian Radical Party				
Pavle Dajić	G17 Plus				
Total				7,952	100.00

Results of the election for the Municipal Assembly of Bač:

Party	Votes	%	Seats
Democratic Party	2,927	39.90	11
Serbian Radical Party	1,948	26.56	8
Democratic Party of Serbia	714	9.73	3
Socialist Party of Serbia	532	7.25	2
G17 Plus	349	4.76	1
Citizens' Groups (two different lists)	196	2.67	–
Reformists of Vojvodina and Slovački Centar	189	2.58	–
Vojvodina for Everyone (League of Social Democrats of Vojvodina, Vojvodina Coalition, Civic Alliance of Serbia, Vojvodina Green Party)	158	2.15	–
Alliance of Vojvodina Hungarians	155	2.11	–
Serbian Renewal Movement	91	1.24	–
Strength of Serbia Movement–Bogoljub Karić	76	1.04	–
Total	7,335	100.00	25
Valid votes	7,335	95.95	
Invalid/blank votes	310	4.05	
Total votes	7,645	100.00	
Registered voters/turnout	13,389	57.10	

===== Bačka Palanka =====
2004 Municipality of Bačka Palanka local election: Mayor of Bačka Palanka
Candidate	Party	First round		Second round	
Candidate	Party	Votes	%	Votes	%
Dragan Bozalo	Serbian Radical Party	4,952	27.94	6,233	51.16
Slobodan Škorić	Socialist Party of Serbia	2,717	15.33	5,951	48.84
Jovan Palalić	Democratic Party of Serbia	2,645	14.92		
Kosta Stakić	Democratic Party	2,503	14.12		
Milutin Rujević	Strength of Serbia Movement	1,733	9.78		
Goran Milošev	New Serbia	951	5.37		
Slobodan Stojnović	Serbian Renewal Movement	911	5.14		
Bogoljub Trkulja	Citizens' Group	740	4.17		
Tatjana Drobac	Christian Democratic Party of Serbia	573	3.23		
Total		17,725	100.00	12,184	100.00

Results of the election for the Municipal Assembly of Bačka Palanka:

Party	Votes	%	Seats
Serbian Radical Party–Tomislav Nikolić	5,409	30.54	16
Democratic Party–Boris Tadić	2,967	16.75	9
Socialist Party of Serbia	2,092	11.81	6
Democratic Party of Serbia–Vojislav Koštunica	1,520	8.58	4
Strength of Serbia Movement Bogoljub Karić	1,172	6.62	3
Citizens' Groups other than Klub Pivničana (ten different lists)	1,011	5.71	–
Serbian Renewal Movement	766	4.33	2
Citizens' Group: Klub Pivničana	735	4.15	2
G17 Plus–Miroljub Labus	424	2.39	–
Reformists of Vojvodina and Slovački Centar	362	2.04	–
League of Social Democrats of Vojvodina	297	1.68	–
New Serbia–Dr. Dušica Višekruna	273	1.54	–
Pensioners Party of Serbia	200	1.13	–
Alliance of Vojvodina Hungarians–Jožef Kasa	173	0.98	–
Christian Democratic Party of Serbia	126	0.71	–
Coalition for a Better Life: Miroslav Glavaš, Civic Alliance of Serbia, Slovak National Party	126	0.71	–
Vojvodina Civil Movement–Sima Jovin	56	0.32	–
Total	17,709	100.00	42
Valid votes	17,709	96.83	
Invalid/blank votes	580	3.17	
Total votes	18,289	100.00	
Registered voters/turnout	47,460	38.54	

The Serbian Radical Party and the Socialist Party of Serbia formed a coalition government after the election. In August 2005, the Serbian government dismissed the local administration on the grounds that the assembly had never been properly constituted and introduced a five-member temporary council pending a new local election on 18 December. Dragan Bozalo, as a directly elected mayor, was not affected by this decision and remained in office.

===== Bački Petrovac =====
2004 Municipality of Bački Petrovac local election: Mayor of Bački Petrovac
Candidate	Party	First round		Second round	
Candidate	Party	Votes	%	Votes	%
Jan Sabo	G17 Plus			1,912	53.23
Pavel Zima (incumbent)	Citizens' Group			1,680	46.77
Miloš Jojić	Serbian Radical Party				
other candidates					
Total				3,592	100.00

Results of the election for the Municipal Assembly of Bački Petrovac:

Party	Votes	%	Seats
Citizens' Groups (four different lists)	1,073	24.04	7
Democratic Party–Boris Tadić	917	20.54	7
G17 Plus–Miroljub Labus	753	16.87	5
Together for Vojvodina–Nenad Čanak	574	12.86	4
Serbian Radical Party–Tomislav Nikolić	390	8.74	3
Socialist Party of Serbia	294	6.59	2
Slovak National Party	287	6.43	2
Strength of Serbia Movement Bogoljub Karić	176	3.94	1
Total	4,464	100.00	31
Valid votes	4,464	97.83	
Invalid/blank votes	99	2.17	
Total votes	4,563	100.00	
Registered voters/turnout	12,120	37.65	

===== Bečej =====
2004 Municipality of Bečej local election: Mayor of Bečej
Candidate	Party	First round		Second round	
Candidate	Party	Votes	%	Votes	%
Đorđe Predin Badža	People's Democratic Party	1,879	14.26	7,215	53.31
József F. Varga	Coalition: Alliance of Vojvodina Hungarians and Christian Democratic European Movement	3,068	23.29	6,319	46.69
Dragan Živkov Džaja	Serbian Radical Party	1,828	13.87		
Zoran Subotički	G17 Plus	1,821	13.82		
Sándor Páll	Democratic Fellowship of Vojvodina Hungarians	1,500	11.39		
Živan Gavrilović	Socialist Party of Serbia	1,239	9.40		
Zoran Stojšin (incumbent)	Democratic Party	937	7.11		
Šandor Reperger	Strength of Serbia Movement	583	4.43		
Đorđe Tot	Citizens' Group	320	2.43		
Total		13,175	100.00	13,534	100.00
Valid votes		13,175	97.60	13,534	98.31
Invalid/blank votes		324	2.40	233	1.69
Total votes		13,499	100.00	13,767	100.00
Registered voters/turnout		34,466	39.17	34,466	39.94

The People's Democratic Party merged into the Democratic Party of Serbia in late 2004; Predin did not participate in the merger but instead joined the Strength of Serbia Movement. He was defeated in a recall election in late 2005, and a new mayoral election was held the following year. The latter election was won by Dušan Jovanović of the Democratic Party of Serbia.

Results of the election for the Municipal Assembly of Bečej:

Party	Votes	%	Seats
Serbian Radical Party–Tomislav Nikolić	2,324	17.72	7
DZVM–Dr. Sándor Páll	1,668	12.72	5
People's Democratic Party–Đorđe Predin Badža	1,657	12.64	5
Together for Our Municipality–Kosanov Pal–Coalition: Alliance of Vojvodina Hungarians and Christian Democratic European Movement	1,619	12.35	4
G17 Plus–Miroljub Labus	1,290	9.84	4
Democratic Party–Boris Tadić	1,116	8.51	3
Democratic Party of Vojvodina Hungarians–Ágoston András	912	6.95	2
Socialist Party of Serbia–Živan Gavrilović	719	5.48	2
Together for Vojvodina–Nenad Čanak	637	4.86	2
Strength of Serbia Movement–Bogoljub Karić	600	4.58	2
Democratic Party of Serbia–Dr. Vojislav Koštunica	236	1.80	–
Citizens' Group: To Protect the Rights of Workers–Dragiša Radenković	195	1.49	–
SPO–Bečej Municipal Board–Slobodan Stanojević Cobi	140	1.07	–
Total	13,113	100.00	36
Valid votes	13,113	97.14	
Invalid/blank votes	386	2.86	
Total votes	13,499	100.00	
Registered voters/turnout	34,466	39.17	

===== Beočin =====
2004 Municipality of Beočin local election: Mayor of Beočin (second round results)
Candidate	Party	Votes	%
Zoran Tešić	Serbian Radical Party	2,501	52.79
Stevan Gudurić	Socialist People's Party	2,237	47.21
Total		4,738	100.00

Results of the election for the Municipal Assembly of Beočin:

Party	Votes	%	Seats
Serbian Radical Party	1,336	23.87	11
Citizens' Groups (ten different lists)	892	15.94	–
Democratic Party	573	10.24	5
Socialist People's Party	565	10.09	4
Democratic Party of Serbia	374	6.68	3
G17 Plus	345	6.16	3
Strength of Serbia Movement	345	6.16	3
Roma Social Democratic Party of Serbia	308	5.50	2
Socialist Party of Serbia	281	5.02	2
New Serbia	273	4.88	2
Serbian Renewal Movement	142	2.54	–
Coalition: Christian Democratic Party of Serbia and People's Peasant Party	91	1.63	–
Democratic Vojvodina–Socialdemocratic Party	72	1.29	–
Total	5,597	100.00	35
Valid votes	5,597	95.87	
Invalid/blank votes	241	4.13	
Total votes	5,838	100.00	
Registered voters/turnout	12,281	47.54	

===== Srbobran =====
2004 Municipality of Srbobran local election: Mayor of Srbobran (second round results)
Candidate	Party	Votes	%
Branko Gajin	Citizens' Group: Alliance for Our Municipality of Srbobran	3,608	57.72
Bore Kutić	Serbian Radical Party–Tomislav Nikolić	2,643	42.28
Total		6,251	100.00

Results of the election for the Municipal Assembly of Srbobran:

Party	Votes	%	Seats
Serbian Radical Party–Tomislav Nikolić	1,789	28.88	9
Citizens' Groups (seven different lists)	1,385	22.36	6
Democratic Party–Boris Tadić	643	10.38	3
Socialist Party of Serbia	473	7.64	2
Strength of Serbia Movement–Bogoljub Karić	447	7.22	2
Coalition: Together for Vojvodina (LSV, DV-PSD, and DHSS)	364	5.88	2
Alliance of Vojvodina Hungarians	333	5.38	2
G17 Plus	237	3.83	1
Serbian Renewal Movement	203	3.28	1
Democratic Fellowship of Vojvodina Hungarians	149	2.41	–
Democratic Party of Vojvodina Hungarians	143	2.31	–
Social Democratic Party	29	0.47	–
Total	6,195	100.00	28
Valid votes	6,195	95.87	
Invalid/blank votes	267	4.13	
Total votes	6,462	100.00	
Registered voters/turnout	13,546	47.70	

===== Sremski Karlovci =====
2004 Municipality of Sremski Karlovci local election: Mayor of Sremski Karlovci
Candidate	Party	First round		Second round	
Candidate	Party	Votes	%	Votes	%
Milenko Filipović	Coalition: G17 Plus–DS–DSS–SPO			1,278	53.29
Branislav Pop Jovanov	Citizens' Group: Non-Partisan Citizens of Sremski Karlovci			1,120	46.71
Živan Đuragić	Serbian Radical Party				
other candidates					
Total				2,398	100.00

Results of the election for the Municipal Assembly of Sremski Karlovci:

Party	Votes	%	Seats
Citizens' Groups (three different lists)	693	23.44	6
Serbian Radical Party–Tomislav Nikolić	649	21.96	6
Democratic Party–Boris Tadić	374	12.65	3
Let Karlovci Win–SNP Svetozar Miletić–Socialist Party of Serbia–People's Party	316	10.69	3
Democratic Party of Serbia–Dr. Vojislav Koštunica	237	8.02	2
G17 Plus–Miroljub Labus	233	7.88	2
"Together for Vojvodina"	181	6.12	2
Strength of Serbia Movement–Bogoljub Karić	118	3.99	1
Serbian Renewal Movement	86	2.91	–
Ravna Gora Freedom Movement	69	2.33	–
Total	2,956	100.00	25
Valid votes	2,956	96.76	
Invalid/blank votes	99	3.24	
Total votes	3,055	100.00	
Registered voters/turnout	7,609	40.15	

===== Temerin =====
2004 Municipality of Temerin local election: Mayor of Temerin
Candidate	Party	First round		Second round	
Candidate	Party	Votes	%	Votes	%
Stojan Tintor	Serbian Radical Party–Tomislav Nikolić	3,821	35.85	6,155	53.16
Tomislav Barna	Democratic Party–Boris Tadić	2,329	21.85	5,423	46.84
Gustonj Andraš	Democratic Party of Vojvodina Hungarians–Ágoston András	1,862	17.47		
Zoran Svitić	Socialist Party of Serbia–Zoran Svitić	926	8.69		
Ðuro Žiga (incumbent)	Democratic Party of Serbia–Dr. Vojislav Koštunica	643	6.03		
Vid Malešević	Strength of Serbia Movement	642	6.02		
Dragan Mićić	Coalition: G17 Plus Serbian Renewal Movement Christian Democratic Party of Serbia	231	2.17		
Siniša Milićević	Reformists of Vojvodina–Mile Isakov	205	1.92		
Total		10,659	100.00	11,578	100.00

Results of the election for the Municipal Assembly of Temerin:

Party	Votes	%	Seats
Serbian Radical Party–Tomislav Nikolić	3,653	34.33	12
Democratic Party–Boris Tadić	1,725	16.21	6
Democratic Party of Vojvodina Hungarians–Ágoston András	1,346	12.65	5
Alliance of Vojvodina Hungarians	808	7.59	3
Socialist Party of Serbia–Zoran Svitić	721	6.78	2
Citizens' Group: List for the Prosperity of the Municipality of Temerin	641	6.02	2
Strength of Serbia Movement–Bogoljub Karić	479	4.50	2
Democratic Party of Serbia–Dr. Vojislav Koštunica	328	3.08	1
Citizens' Group: Nedeljko Ðukić	269	2.53	–
Coalition: G17 Plus SPO DHSS	221	2.08	–
Reformists of Vojvodina–Mile Isakov	130	1.22	–
Citizens' Group: Tera Varga Laslo	115	1.08	–
Party of Serbian Unity	112	1.05	–
Citizens' Group: Miodrag Popadić	69	0.65	–
Citizens' Group: Simo Kalaba	25	0.23	–
Total	10,642	100.00	33
Valid votes	10,642	98.09	
Invalid/blank votes	207	1.91	
Total votes	10,849	100.00	
Registered voters/turnout	22,147	48.99	

Future parliamentarian Rozália Ökrész appeared on the Alliance of Vojvodina Hungarians list but did not receive a mandate.

===== Titel =====
2004 Municipality of Titel local election: Mayor of Titel (second round results)
Candidate	Party	Votes	%
Milivoj Petrović (incumbent)	Democratic Party–Boris Tadić	2,731	51.28
Ivana Zečević	Serbian Radical Party	2,595	48.72
Total		5,326	100.00

Results of the election for the Municipal Assembly of Titel:

Party	Votes	%	Seats
Democratic Party–Boris Tadić	1,496	27.66	8
Serbian Radical Party–Tomislav Nikolić	1,190	22.00	7
Citizens' Groups (seven different lists)	621	11.48	2
Socialist Party of Serbia	552	10.21	3
Strength of Serbia Movement–Bogoljub Karić	426	7.88	2
Democratic Party of Serbia–Dr. Vojislav Koštunica	422	7.80	2
Serbian Renewal Movement Dragica Radić	233	4.31	1
Together for Vojvodina	141	2.61	–
G17 Plus–Miroljub Labus	139	2.57	–
Social Democratic Union	121	2.24	–
Vojvodina Autonomist Movement	67	1.24	–
Total	5,408	100.00	25
Valid votes	5,408	96.18	
Invalid/blank votes	215	3.82	
Total votes	5,623	100.00	
Registered voters/turnout	11,888	47.30	

===== Vrbas =====
2004 Municipality of Vrbas local election: Mayor of Vrbas
Candidate	Party	First round		Second round	
Candidate	Party	Votes	%	Votes	%
Željko Lainović	Serbian Radical Party–Tomislav Nikolić	3,903	26.26	7,471	53.97
Milan Stanimirović (incumbent)	Democratic Party–Boris Tadić	2,836	19.08	6,372	46.03
Rajko Krivokapić Mićo	Socialist Party of Serbia	1,516	10.20		
Miroslav Aleksić	People's Democratic Party	1,447	9.74		
Dr. Bratislav Kažić	Democratic Party of Serbia–Dr. Vojislav Koštunica	1,266	8.52		
Miodrag Vukotić	New Social Democracy of Vojvodina	1,033	6.95		
Sava Šuvakov	Strength of Serbia Movement–Bogoljub Karić	747	5.03		
Dragan Marković Gago	Citizens' Group	660	4.44		
Slavko Vujačić	G17 Plus–Miroljub Labus	435	2.93		
Saša Bajić	Citizens' Group: Alone Against All	404	2.72		
Borislav Mušikić	Citizens' Group: In the Interests of the Citizens, Not the Political Parties	339	2.28		
Jelena Perković	Citizens' Group	275	1.85		
Total		14,861	100.00	13,843	100.00
Valid votes		14,861	97.44	13,843	97.55
Invalid/blank votes		390	2.56	348	2.45
Total votes		15,251	100.00	14,191	100.00
Registered voters/turnout		36,220	42.11	36,274	39.12

Results of the election for the Municipal Assembly of Vrbas:

Party	Votes	%	Seats
Serbian Radical Party–Tomislav Nikolić	4,720	31.86	14
Democratic Party–Boris Tadić	3,252	21.95	9
Socialist Party of Serbia	1,292	8.72	4
Democratic Party of Serbia–Dr. Vojislav Koštunica	851	5.74	2
People's Democratic Party–Blagoje Baković	783	5.28	2
Strength of Serbia Movement–Bogoljub Karić	600	4.05	2
New Social Democracy of Vojvodina–Miodrag Vukotić	577	3.89	2
G17 Plus–Miroljub Labus	471	3.18	1
Citizens' Group: Dr. Miodrag Ivanović	409	2.76	–
Reformists of Vojvodina–Dragan Marković	328	2.21	–
League of Social Democrats of Vojvodina–Nenad Čanak	245	1.65	–
Citizens' Group: Ecological Movement–Citizens' Parliament	244	1.65	–
Serbian Renewal Movement	214	1.44	–
Citizens' Group: Radenko Šimun	206	1.39	–
Citizens' Group: Pensioners	172	1.16	–
Citizens' Group: Workers' List	112	0.76	–
New Serbia–Capital for the Municipality of Vrbas	99	0.67	–
Social Democratic Party	71	0.48	–
Citizens' Group: Dušan Jovović	68	0.46	–
Civic Alliance of Serbia–Dijana Kovačević	55	0.37	–
Citizens' Group: Jovan Rodić	47	0.32	–
Total	14,816	100.00	36
Valid votes	14,816	97.23	
Invalid/blank votes	422	2.77	
Total votes	15,238	100.00	
Registered voters/turnout	36,274	42.01	

===== Žabalj =====
2004 Municipality of Žabalj local election: Mayor of Žabalj
Candidate	Party	First round		Second round	
Candidate	Party	Votes	%	Votes	%
Vojislav Duvnjak	Serbian Radical Party	1,911	28.32	3,068	59.71
Boro Milić	Democratic Party–Boris Tadić	1,072	15.89	2,070	40.29
Miodrag Zlokolica Mile	Strength of Serbia Movement	929	13.77		
Miodrag Janjoš	Democratic Party of Serbia–Vojislav Koštunica	685	10.15		
Zoran Jakšić	Alliance of Serbs of Vojvodina	678	10.05		
Zoran Radomir Keser	Serbian Renewal Movement–Vasa Zlokolica	620	9.19		
Miloš Šovljanski	Socialist Party of Serbia	508	7.53		
Miroslav Ninić	G17 Plus	345	5.11		
Total		6,748	100.00	5,138	100.00
Valid votes		6,748	95.72	5,138	97.37
Invalid/blank votes		302	4.28	139	2.63
Total votes		7,050	100.00	5,277	100.00
Registered voters/turnout		20,137	35.01	20,137	26.21

Results of the election for the Municipal Assembly of Žabalj:

Party	Votes	%	Seats
Serbian Radical Party–Tomislav Nikolić	2,406	36.04	12
Democratic Party–Boris Tadić	1,054	15.79	5
Strength of Serbia Movement–Bogoljub Karić	622	9.32	3
G17 Plus–Miroljub Labus	527	7.89	2
Serbian Renewal Movement–Vasa Zlokolica	496	7.43	2
Socialist Party of Serbia	345	5.17	2
Victory Coalition–Svetozar Panić Batika–Dragan Zlokolica (League of Social Democrats of Vojvodina, Citizens' Group)	340	5.09	2
Alliance of Serbs of Vojvodina–Radovan Jakovljević	329	4.93	2
Democratic Party of Serbia–Dr. Vojislav Koštunica	230	3.45	1
Reformists of Vojvodina–SDP–Mile Isakov	167	2.50	–
Citizens' Group: Pensioners	83	1.24	–
Citizens' Group: Prometheus	40	0.60	–
Citizens' Group: Injured Workers of the Municipality of Žabalj	37	0.55	–
Total	6,676	100.00	31
Valid votes	6,676	94.70	
Invalid/blank votes	374	5.30	
Total votes	7,050	100.00	
Registered voters/turnout	20,137	35.01	

==== Srem District ====
Elections were held in all seven municipalities of the Srem District. In each jurisdiction, the second-round mayoral vote saw a representative of the far-right Serbian Radical Party face a candidate from a centrist party. The Radicals won in Ruma, Šid, and Stara Pazova; a Democratic Party of Serbia candidate won in Sremska Mitrovica, a G17 Plus candidate won in Irig, a Democratic Party candidate won in Pećinci, and a member of the Civic Alliance of Serbia won in Inđija.

===== Sremska Mitrovica =====
2004 Municipality of Sremska Mitrovica local election: Mayor of Sremska Mitrovica
Candidate	Party	First round		Second round	
Candidate	Party	Votes	%	Votes	%
Zoran Miščević	Democratic Party of Serbia			11,898	52.55
Milenko Makivić	Serbian Radical Party			10,745	47.45
other candidates					
Total				22,643	100.00

Results of the election for the Municipal Assembly of Sremska Mitrovica:

Party	Votes	%	Seats
Serbian Radical Party	7,420	29.54	20
Democratic Party	4,451	17.72	12
Democratic Party of Serbia	3,723	14.82	10
Strength of Serbia Movement	2,169	8.63	6
Together for Vojvodina (League of Social Democrats of Vojvodina, Liberals of Serbia, Civic Alliance of Serbia, USV, Vojvodina Movement, Vojvodina Union, Democratic Vojvodina)	1,682	6.70	4
Citizens' Groups (six different lists)	1,366	5.44	–
G17 Plus	1,164	4.63	3
Coalition: Serbian Renewal Movement–Social Democracy	873	3.48	2
Socialist People's Party	832	3.31	2
Socialist Party of Serbia	783	3.12	2
New Serbia	285	1.13	–
Workers Party of Jugoslavia	157	0.62	–
PO Alliance of Serbs of Vojvodina	135	0.54	–
Coalition: Blok Communist (New Communist Party of Yugoslavia, Yugoslav Communists)	82	0.33	–
Total	25,122	100.00	61
Valid votes	25,122	96.82	
Invalid/blank votes	824	3.18	
Total votes	25,946	100.00	
Registered voters/turnout	66,845	38.82	

===== Inđija =====
2004 Municipality of Inđija local election: Mayor of Inđija
Candidate	Party	First round		Second round	
Candidate	Party	Votes	%	Votes	%
Goran Ješić (incumbent)	Citizens' Group: Only the Best for Inđija			9,117	52.19
Ruža Avalić	Serbian Radical Party			8,351	47.81
other candidates					
Total				17,468	100.00

Ješić was a member of the Civic Alliance of Serbia in 2004. He left that party in 2006 to join the Democratic Party.

Results of the election for the Municipal Assembly of Inđija:

Party	Votes	%	Seats
Serbian Radical Party	5,459	33.29	15
Citizens' Groups (four different lists)	3,734	22.77	8
Democratic Party	1,785	10.89	5
Socialist Party of Serbia	1,190	7.26	3
For Inđija and Progressive Villages (People's Peasant Party, Movement for Vojvodina)	951	5.80	2
Democratic Party of Serbia	783	4.78	2
Strength of Serbia Movement	642	3.92	2
G17 Plus	410	2.50	–
People's Democratic Party	404	2.46	–
Together for Vojvodina	335	2.04	–
Movement of Veterans of Serbia	328	2.00	–
Serbian Renewal Movement	236	1.44	–
New Serbia	139	0.85	–
Total	16,396	100.00	37
Valid votes	16,396	97.05	
Invalid/blank votes	499	2.95	
Total votes	16,895	100.00	
Registered voters/turnout	38,018	44.44	

===== Irig =====
2004 Municipality of Irig local election: Mayor of Irig
Candidate	Party	First round		Second round	
Candidate	Party	Votes	%	Votes	%
Radovan Ercegovac	G17 Plus			2,278	64.22
Vitomir Plužarević	Serbian Radical Party			1,269	35.78
other candidates					
Total				3,547	100.00

Results of the election for the Municipal Assembly of Irig:

Party	Votes	%	Seats
Serbian Radical Party	1,027	25.51	6
Citizens' Groups (six different lists)	697	17.31	2
Democratic Party	591	14.68	3
League of Social Democrats of Vojvodina	476	11.82	3
Socialist Party of Serbia	394	9.79	2
Coalition: DSS–SPO	297	7.38	2
G17 Plus	283	7.03	1
Strength of Serbia Movement	175	4.35	1
Social Democratic Party	86	2.14	–
Total	4,026	100.00	20
Valid votes	4,026	88.85	
Invalid/blank votes	505	11.15	
Total votes	4,531	100.00	
Registered voters/turnout	8,889	50.97	

===== Pećinci =====
2004 Municipality of Pećinci local election: Mayor of Pećinci
Candidate	Party	First round		Second round	
Candidate	Party	Votes	%	Votes	%
Nikola Pavković (incumbent)	Democratic Party			2,865	55.58
Lazar Čavić	Serbian Radical Party			2,290	44.42
other candidates					
Total				5,155	100.00

Results of the election for the Municipal Assembly of Pećinci:

Party	Votes	%	Seats
Citizens' Groups (eight different lists)	1,836	27.83	6
Serbian Radical Party	1,501	22.75	8
Democratic Party	1,090	16.52	6
Democratic Party of Serbia	485	7.35	3
Socialist Party of Serbia	386	5.85	2
Coalition: Serbian Renewal Movement and New Serbia	341	5.17	2
Strength of Serbia Movement	300	4.55	2
G17 Plus	244	3.70	1
League of Social Democrats of Vojvodina	181	2.74	–
People's Peasant Party	160	2.43	–
Party of Serbian Unity	73	1.11	–
Total	6,597	100.00	30
Valid votes	6,597	95.53	
Invalid/blank votes	309	4.47	
Total votes	6,906	100.00	
Registered voters/turnout	15,261	45.25	

===== Ruma =====
2004 Municipality of Ruma local election: Mayor of Ruma
Candidate	Party	First round		Second round	
Candidate	Party	Votes	%	Votes	%
Srđan Nikolić	Serbian Radical Party	5,255	35.34	8,630	62.86
Snežana Nikolajević	Democratic Party	1,971	13.25	5,098	37.14
Smilja Lončar	Democratic Party of Serbia	1,571	10.56		
Dragan Krstić	Socialist Party of Serbia	1,333	8.96		
Biljana Milošević	Strength of Serbia Movement	920	6.19		
Jovica Doroški	not listed	733	4.93		
Nebojša Vitomirović	League of Social Democrats of Vojvodina	718	4.83		
Slobodan Negovanović	not listed	703	4.73		
Stevan Mijić	not listed	603	4.06		
Jovan Krompić	not listed	547	3.68		
Oliver Ognjenović	not listed	516	3.47		
Total		14,870	100.00	13,728	100.00
Valid votes		14,870	97.01	13,728	97.73
Invalid/blank votes		458	2.99	319	2.27
Total votes		15,328	100.00	14,047	100.00
Registered voters/turnout		45,607	33.61	45,604	30.80

Results of the election for the Municipal Assembly of Ruma:

Party	Votes	%	Seats
Serbian Radical Party–Tomislav Nikolić	5,551	37.30	20
Democratic Party–Boris Tadić	2,246	15.09	8
Citizens' Groups (nine different lists)	1,447	9.72	–
Socialist Party of Serbia–Dr. Milutin Stojković	1,306	8.78	5
Democratic Party of Serbia–Vojislav Koštunica	945	6.35	3
Strength of Serbia Movement–Bogoljub Karić	847	5.69	3
League of Social Democrats of Vojvodina Srem for the Municipality of Ruma–Nebojša Vitomirović	532	3.57	2
G17 Plus–Miroljub Labus	517	3.47	2
New Serbia and Alliance of Serbs of Vojvodina	288	1.94	–
Coalition: Reformists of Vojvodina–People's Peasant Party, Social Democracy and Party of Workers and Pensioners	251	1.69	–
Serbian Renewal Movement	222	1.49	–
Coalition: Patriotic Party of the Diaspora and Social Democratic Party (Socijaldemokratska Stranka)	216	1.45	–
United Peasant Party	198	1.33	–
Civic Alliance of Serbia	167	1.12	–
Coalition: Blok Komunista (NKPJ–Yugoslav Communists)	149	1.00	–
Total	14,882	100.00	43
Valid votes	14,882	97.03	
Invalid/blank votes	456	2.97	
Total votes	15,338	100.00	
Registered voters/turnout	45,604	33.63	

The Serbian Radical Party and Democratic Party of Serbia formed a coalition government after the election. Future parliamentarian Aleksandar Martinović was a member of the municipal council.

In 2007, three Radical Party assembly members aligned with the opposition, which allowed the Democratic Party to form a new coalition government. Nenad Borović was chosen as president (i.e., speaker) of the assembly. This prompted a crisis in the local government, as the former administration refused to turn over the seals of government or allow the new administration access to the official premises of the municipality. After six months of a stalemate, the Serbian government dissolved the assembly in March 2008 and appointed a provisional administration with Borović as its leader. Nikolić also continued in the office of mayor pending the formation of a new government.

===== Šid =====
2004 Municipality of Šid local election: Mayor of Šid
Candidate	Party	First round		Second round	
Candidate	Party	Votes	%	Votes	%
Mita Avramov	Serbian Radical Party			5,323	51.17
Ljubomir Valentirović	Citizens' Group: Healthy Serbia–Movement for Šid			5,079	48.83
other candidates					
Total				10,402	100.00

Results of the election for the Municipal Assembly of Šid:

Party	Votes	%	Seats
Serbian Radical Party	3,387	30.10	13
Democratic Party	1,931	17.16	7
Citizens' Groups (three different lists)	1,552	13.79	5
Democratic Party of Serbia	894	7.94	3
Socialist Party of Serbia	702	6.24	3
Strength of Serbia Movement	659	5.86	2
Coalition: SPO–NSS	625	5.55	2
G17 Plus	565	5.02	2
Socialist People's Party	451	4.01	2
Together for Vojvodina	275	2.44	–
Liberals of Serbia	212	1.88	–
Total	11,253	100.00	39
Valid votes	11,253	96.88	
Invalid/blank votes	362	3.12	
Total votes	11,615	100.00	
Registered voters/turnout	29,770	39.02	

===== Stara Pazova =====
2004 Municipality of Stara Pazova local election: Mayor of Stara Pazova
Candidate	Party	First round		Second round	
Candidate	Party	Votes	%	Votes	%
Srđo Komazec	Serbian Radical Party			8,566	56.54
Jovan Tišma (incumbent)	Democratic Party			6,583	43.46
other candidates					
Total				15,149	100.00

Results of the election for the Municipal Assembly of Stara Pazova:

Party	Votes	%	Seats
Serbian Radical Party	5,313	31.86	16
Democratic Party	3,990	23.92	12
Democratic Party of Serbia	1,822	10.92	6
Strength of Serbia Movement	1,250	7.49	4
Socialist Party of Serbia	1,115	6.69	4
Citizens' Groups (six different lists)	978	5.86	–
G17 Plus	764	4.58	2
Coalition: Serbian Renewal Movement and New Serbia	760	4.56	2
League of Social Democrats of Vojvodina	582	3.49	2
New Communist Party of Yugoslavia	104	0.62	–
Total	16,678	100.00	48
Valid votes	16,678	97.30	
Invalid/blank votes	463	2.70	
Total votes	17,141	100.00	
Registered voters/turnout	47,389	36.17	

==== West Bačka District ====
Elections were held in all four municipalities of the West Bačka District. The Democratic Party won the mayoralty in Sombor, the largest community, while the Socialists won in Apatin and the Radicals won in Kula and Odžaci. Subsequently, the Radical Party mayor in Kula was defeated in a recall election, and the Democratic Party won the by-election that followed.

===== Sombor =====
2004 Municipality of Sombor local election: Mayor of Sombor
Candidate	Party	First round		Second round	
Candidate	Party	Votes	%	Votes	%
Dr. Jovan Slavković	Democratic Party			13,052	56.94
Stevan Kesejić	Serbian Radical Party			9,869	43.06
Čedomir Backović	Citizens' Group: 25,000 Euros				
Goran Bulajić	Democratic Party of Serbia				
Rajko Bulatović	information missing				
Kosta Dedić	Strength of Serbia Movement				
Zlata Đerić	New Serbia–Social Democracy–Revival of Serbia–"Svetozar Miletić" Movement (Affiliation: New Serbia)				
Vladislav Kronić	G17 Plus				
Marta Horvat Odri	Democratic Fellowship of Vojvodina Hungarians				
Dušan Popović	Socialist Party of Serbia				
Miodrag Sekulić	Independent (endorsed by Serbian Renewal Movement–People's Democratic Party)				
Total				22,921	100.00

Results of the election for the Municipal Assembly of Sombor:

Party	Votes	%	Seats
Serbian Radical Party	6,453	25.03	17
Democratic Party	5,580	21.64	15
Democratic Party of Serbia–Dr. Vojislav Koštunica	2,307	8.95	6
"Zajedno–Miodrag Sekulić, SPO–NDS"	1,636	6.34	5
G17 Plus–Miroljub Labus	1,449	5.62	4
Alliance of Vojvodina Hungarians	1,190	4.61	3
VMDK–LSV–Step Forward	1,189	4.61	3
Strength of Serbia Movement–Bogoljub Karić	1,109	4.30	3
Citizens' Groups (four different lists)	932	3.61	–
New Serbia Velja Ilić–for 205	920	3.57	3
Socialist Party of Serbia–Dr. Dušan Popović	873	3.39	2
Democratic Party of Vojvodina Hungarians-DSVM–Neveda Ferenc	519	2.01	–
Convention for Sombor	305	1.18	–
Pensioners' Party of Serbia–Dušan Bajić	302	1.17	–
Vojvodina Citizens' Movement–Zoran Terzin	295	1.14	–
Sombor Party of Prosperity–Dušan Radusin	270	1.05	–
For Truth and Justice, Without Deception–Petar Relić Saka: Democratic Party of Vojvodina, Party of Free Patriots, Christian Democratic Party of Serbia, Labour Party of Serbia	148	0.57	–
Democratic Centre of Serbia–Branko Svilar	130	0.50	–
Ravna Gora Movement D.M.	65	0.25	–
Party of Citizens of Serbia	60	0.23	–
Reformists of Vojvodina–Social Democratic Party	54	0.21	–
Total	25,786	100.00	61
Valid votes	25,786	97.23	
Invalid/blank votes	734	2.77	
Total votes	26,520	100.00	
Registered voters/turnout	77,920	34.03	

Future parliamentarian Žika Gojković of the Serbian Renewal Movement was elected on the SPO–NDS list. Former and future parliamentarian Zlata Đerić was elected on the New Serbia list.

===== Apatin =====
2004 Municipality of Apatin local election: Mayor of Apatin
Candidate	Party	First round		Second round	
Candidate	Party	Votes	%	Votes	%
Živorad Smiljanić	Socialist Party of Serbia			5,688	64.32
information missing				3,155	35.68
Milan Škrbić	Serbian Radical Party				
other candidates					
Total				8,843	100.00

Results of the election for the Municipal Assembly of Apatin:

Party	Votes	%	Seats
Democratic Party–Boris Tadić	2,660	29.43	10
Socialist Party of Serbia–Dr. Živorad Smiljanić	1,952	21.60	8
Serbian Radical Party–Tomislav Nikolić	1,912	21.16	7
Democratic Party of Serbia–Dr. Vojislav Koštunica	637	7.05	3
Strength of Serbia Movement–Bogoljub Karić	292	3.23	1
Citizens' Group: For the Municipality of Apatin–Dr. Milka Zorić	246	2.72	–
G17 Plus–Miroljub Labus	225	2.49	–
Roma Social Democratic Party–Antun Čonka	212	2.35	–
Citizens' Group: Roma Settlement–Petrović Josip Sepika	190	2.10	–
Pensioners' Party of Serbia–Gojko Korica	166	1.84	–
Citizens' Group: "Petar Kočić"–Đorđo Kuridža	164	1.81	–
New Serbia–Milorad Mrđa	144	1.59	–
Citizens' Group: Ratko Nikšić	112	1.24	–
Serbian Renewal Movement–Vuk Drašković	49	0.54	–
Citizens' Group: Radmanović Đuro	45	0.50	–
Citizens' Group: City Choir–Gojko Rađenović	24	0.27	–
Party of Citizens of Serbia	7	0.08	–
Total	9,037	100.00	29
Valid votes	9,037	96.47	
Invalid/blank votes	331	3.53	
Total votes	9,368	100.00	
Registered voters/turnout	26,952	34.76	

===== Kula =====
2004 Municipality of Kula local election: Mayor of Kula
Candidate	Party	First round		Second round	
Candidate	Party	Votes	%	Votes	%
Tihomir Đuričić - Tiho	Serbian Radical Party–Tomislav Nikolić			5,613	55.10
Slaviša Božović	Democratic Party–Boris Tadić			4,574	44.90
Svetozar Bukvić	Citizens' Group				
Ratko Miletić	Socialist Party of Serbia–Yugoslav Communists				
Željko Tatalović	Democratic Party of Serbia–Dr. Vojislav Koštunica				
Stanko Zrakić	Citizens' Group: Stanko Zrakić				
Saša Maksimović	Serbian Renewal Movement–Otpor Kula				
Hercen Radonjić - Keka	Vojvodina Green Party–Hercen Radonjić Keka				
Zoran Prekajac	G17 Plus–Miroljub Labus				
Branislav Vlahović	Strength of Serbia Movement–Bogoljub Karić				
Dr. Marija Popin	Liberals of Serbia				
Milan Egić	Citizens' Group: Milan Egić				
Total				10,187	100.00

Đuričić was defeated in a recall election in 2006, and a mayoral by-election was held later in that year.

Results of the election for the Municipal Assembly of Kula:

Party	Votes	%	Seats
Citizens' Groups (ten different lists)	3,495	28.39	9
Serbian Radical Party–Tomislav Nikolić	3,043	24.72	11
Democratic Party–Boris Tadić	2,222	18.05	8
Democratic Party of Serbia–Dr. Vojislav Koštunica	623	5.06	2
Coalition: Socialist Party of Serbia–Yugoslav Communists	516	4.19	2
Vojvodina Green Party	493	4.00	2
G17 Plus–Miroljub Labus	420	3.41	2
Serbian Renewal Movement–Otpor Kula	393	3.19	1
Strength of Serbia Movement–Bogoljub Karić	300	2.44	–
Pensioners' Party of Serbia	202	1.64	–
Liberals of Serbia–Dr. Marija Popin	198	1.61	–
Coalition: Reformists of Vojvodina–Social Democratic Party–Branko Popović	147	1.19	–
Coalition: Social Democracy–Socialist People's Party–Labour Party of Serbia	136	1.10	–
People's Democratic Party	71	0.58	–
New Serbia	51	0.41	–
Total	12,310	100.00	37
Valid votes	12,310	96.71	
Invalid/blank votes	419	3.29	
Total votes	12,729	100.00	
Registered voters/turnout	37,367	34.06	

===== Odžaci =====
2004 Municipality of Odžaci local election: Mayor of Odžaci (second round results)
Candidate	Party	Votes	%
Milan Ćuk	Serbian Radical Party	4,152	51.34
Predrag Cvetanović	Democratic Party	3,936	48.66
Total		8,088	100.00

Results of the election for the Municipal Assembly of Odžaci:

Party	Votes	%	Seats
Serbian Radical Party	3,067	29.77	9
Democratic Party	2,202	21.37	7
Coalition: SPS–Social Democracy	1,233	11.97	4
Democratic Party of Serbia	859	8.34	3
Strength of Serbia Movement	775	7.52	2
Citizens' Groups (three different lists)	751	7.29	2
Serbian Renewal Movement	344	3.34	1
People's Democratic Party	236	2.29	–
G17 Plus	235	2.28	–
Together for Vojvodina	225	2.18	–
Pensioners' Party of Serbia	182	1.77	–
Social Democratic Party	140	1.36	–
New Serbia	54	0.52	–
Total	10,303	100.00	28
Valid votes	10,303	96.74	
Invalid/blank votes	347	3.26	
Total votes	10,650	100.00	
Registered voters/turnout	28,562	37.29	

=== Central Serbia (excluding Belgrade) ===
==== Mačva District ====
Local elections were held in all eight municipalities of the Mačva District. The Democratic Party won the mayoral contests in Šabac, Krupanj, and Vladimirci, while G17 Plus won in Loznica. The Socialist Party of Serbia won in Bogatić and Vladimirci, Social Democracy won Mali Zvornik, and independent candidate Veroljub Matić won in Koceljeva.

===== Šabac =====
2004 Municipality of Šabac local election: Mayor of Šabac
Candidate	Party	First round		Second round	
Candidate	Party	Votes	%	Votes	%
Miloš Milošević	Democratic Party–Serbian Renewal Movement (Affiliation: Democratic Party)	13,543	38.82	16,696	63.58
Srboljub Živanović	Serbian Radical Party–Tomislav Nikolić	5,832	16.72	9,564	36.42
Jasmina Milutinović	Democratic Party of Serbia–Vojislav Koštunica, NDS (Affiliation: Democratic Party of Serbia)	4,205	12.05		
Mile Isaković	Strength of Serbia Movement	3,341	9.58		
Stanoje Pantelić	not listed	3,325	9.53		
Negoslav Gačić	G17 Plus	1,683	4.82		
Marko Maksimović	Citizens' Group: Voice of the People	1,626	4.66		
Marko Todorović	Citizens' Group: For a Better Life for All Citizens	731	2.10		
Momir Glišić	New Serbia	597	1.71		
Total		34,883	100.00	26,260	100.00
Valid votes		34,883	96.92		
Invalid/blank votes		1,109	3.08		
Total votes		35,992	100.00		
Registered voters/turnout		100,390	35.85		
Source: The first round results may be preliminary rather than final totals.

Results of the election for the Municipal Assembly of Šabac:

Party	Votes	%	Seats
Democratic Party–Serbian Renewal Movement	11,553	33.03	24
Serbian Radical Party–Tomislav Nikolić	5,908	16.89	12
Democratic Party of Serbia–Vojislav Koštunica, NDS	4,964	14.19	11
Socialist Party of Serbia–Zoran Bortić	3,926	11.23	8
Strength of Serbia Movement–Bogoljub Karić	2,577	7.37	6
Citizens' Groups (seven different lists)	2,361	6.75	2
G17 Plus–Miroljub Labus	1,738	4.97	4
People's Peasant Party–Marijan Rističević	1,102	3.15	2
New Serbia–Velimir Ilić–Božidar Katić	473	1.35	–
Yugoslav Communists Šabac	232	0.66	–
New Democratic Party of Roma in Serbia	141	0.40	–
Total	34,975	100.00	69
Valid votes	34,975	96.74	
Invalid/blank votes	1,178	3.26	
Total votes	36,153	100.00	
Registered voters/turnout	100,383	36.02	

===== Bogatić =====
2004 Municipality of Bogatić local election: Mayor of Bogatić
Candidate	Party	First round		Second round	
Candidate	Party	Votes	%	Votes	%
Radenko Petrić	Socialist Party of Serbia–Socialist People's Party (Affiliation: Socialist Party of Serbia)			6,033	53.07
Darko Pajčić	G17 Plus–Serbian Renewal Movement–Otpor			5,335	46.93
Zoran Milošević	Serbian Radical Party				
other candidates					
Total				11,368	100.00

Petrić faced a recall election in 2007 but remained in office.

Results of the election for the Municipal Assembly of Bogatić:

Party	Votes	%	Seats
Socialist Party of Serbia–Socialist People's Party	2,238	19.24	6
Serbian Renewal Movement	2,131	18.32	6
Serbian Radical Party	2,073	17.83	6
Democratic Party	1,481	12.74	4
Democratic Party of Serbia	1,051	9.04	3
Citizens' Groups (four different lists)	770	6.62	1
Strength of Serbia Movement	661	5.68	2
G17 Plus	647	5.56	2
New Serbia	577	4.96	1
Total	11,629	100.00	31
Valid votes	11,629	96.18	
Invalid/blank votes	462	3.82	
Total votes	12,091	100.00	
Registered voters/turnout	26,100	46.33	

Control of the local assembly changed several times in the term that followed. After the failed mayoral recall election in 2007, the assembly was dissolved and replaced with a provisional council.

===== Koceljeva =====
2004 Municipality of Koceljeva local election: Mayor of Koceljeva
Candidate	Party	First round		Second round	
Candidate	Party	Votes	%	Votes	%
Veroljub Matić	Citizens' Group			3,609	70.74
Mihajlo Paunović	Serbian Renewal Movement–G17 Plus (Affiliation: Serbian Renewal Movement)			1,493	29.26
Branko Ranković	Serbian Radical Party				
other candidates					
Total				5,102	100.00

Results of the election for the Municipal Assembly of Koceljeva:

Party	Votes	%	Seats
Serbian Radical Party	1,069	18.46	6
Citizens' Groups (four different lists)	1,034	17.86	2
Socialist Party of Serbia	812	14.02	5
Democratic Party	687	11.86	4
Coalition: Serbian Renewal Movement–G17 Plus	520	8.98	3
Democratic Party of Serbia	513	8.86	3
New Democratic Party of Roma in Serbia	347	5.99	2
Strength of Serbia Movement	278	4.80	2
Liberals of Serbia	270	4.66	2
New Serbia	261	4.51	2
Total	5,791	100.00	31
Valid votes	5,791	94.66	
Invalid/blank votes	327	5.34	
Total votes	6,118	100.00	
Registered voters/turnout	12,760	47.95	

===== Krupanj =====
2004 Municipality of Krupanj local election: Mayor of Krupanj
Candidate	Party	First round		Second round	
Candidate	Party	Votes	%	Votes	%
Zoran Grujičić Mindo	Democratic Party–Serbian Renewal Movement (Affiliation: Democratic Party)			4,275	61.95
Milojko Grujić	Socialist Party of Serbia			2,626	38.05
Rade Milićević	Serbian Radical Party				
other candidates					
Total				6,901	100.00

Grujičić was removed as mayor in a January 2007 recall vote, and a mayoral by-election took place later in the year.

Results of the election for the Municipal Assembly of Krupanj:

Party	Votes	%	Seats
Socialist Party of Serbia	1,502	21.90	8
Democratic Party of Serbia	1,483	21.62	8
Democratic Party	1,223	17.83	6
Serbian Radical Party	787	11.47	4
G17 Plus	510	7.44	3
Serbian Renewal Movement	448	6.53	2
Strength of Serbia Movement	399	5.82	2
Christian Democratic Party of Serbia	297	4.33	2
Citizens' Group	128	1.87	–
New Serbia–People's Democratic Party	82	1.20	–
Total	6,859	100.00	35
Valid votes	6,859	95.72	
Invalid/blank votes	307	4.28	
Total votes	7,166	100.00	
Registered voters/turnout	15,983	44.84	

===== Ljubovija =====
2004 Ljubovija municipal election: Mayor of Ljubovija
Candidate	Party	First round		Second round	
Candidate	Party	Votes	%	Votes	%
Vidoje Jovanović (incumbent)	Socialist Party of Serbia			3,286	52.24
Zoran Nikolić	Democratic Party			3,004	47.76
Sreto Perić	Serbian Radical Party				
other candidates					
Total				6,290	100.00

Results of the election for the Municipal Assembly of Ljubovija:

Party	Votes	%	Seats
Socialist Party of Serbia	2,045	30.02	11
Democratic Party	1,469	21.57	8
Serbian Radical Party	1,176	17.27	7
Democratic Party of Serbia	683	10.03	3
Strength of Serbia Movement	630	9.25	3
Serbian Renewal Movement	500	7.34	3
G17 Plus	183	2.69	–
Citizens' Groups (two different lists)	125	1.84	–
Total	6,811	100.00	35
Valid votes	6,811	93.51	
Invalid/blank votes	473	6.49	
Total votes	7,284	100.00	
Registered voters/turnout	13,103	55.59	

The Socialist Party of Serbia, the Serbian Radical Party, and the Democratic Party of Serbia formed a local coalition government after the election. Parliamentarian Sreto Perić of the Radicals was elected to the assembly and served afterward on the municipal council (i.e., the executive branch of the municipal government).

A chaotic situation emerged in 2007, when two rival coalitions both claimed to hold a majority of seats in the local assembly.

===== Loznica =====
2004 Loznica municipal election: Mayor of Loznica
Candidate	Party	First round		Second round	
Candidate	Party	Votes	%	Votes	%
Vidoje Petrović	G17 Plus			14,661	63.75
Zoran Nikolić	Citizens' Group			8,335	36.25
Milivoje Krasavac	Serbian Radical Party				
other candidates					
Total				22,996	100.00

Results of the election for the Municipal Assembly of Loznica:

Party	Votes	%	Seats
Democratic Party–Serbian Renewal Movement	5,377	18.42	11
Citizens' Groups (six different lists)	3,956	13.56	7
Serbian Radical Party	3,711	12.72	7
Socialist Party of Serbia	3,349	11.48	7
G17 Plus	3,279	11.24	7
Democratic Party of Serbia	2,709	9.28	5
Strength of Serbia Movement	2,105	7.21	4
New Serbia	1,356	4.65	3
Social Democratic Party (Socijaldemokratska stranka)	840	2.88	–
People's Radical Party	424	1.45	–
People's Peasant Party	406	1.39	–
People's Party–DHSS	399	1.37	–
New Serbian Radical Party	299	1.02	–
Serbian Liberal Party	227	0.78	–
Social Democratic Party (Socijaldemokratska partija)	192	0.66	–
SSJ–Socialist People's Party	177	0.61	–
Workers Party of Yugoslavia	170	0.58	–
People's Democratic Party	112	0.38	–
New Communist Party of Yugoslavia	96	0.33	–
Total	29,184	100.00	51
Valid votes	29,184	95.74	
Invalid/blank votes	1,298	4.26	
Total votes	30,482	100.00	
Registered voters/turnout	72,148	42.25	

===== Mali Zvornik =====
2004 Mali Zvornik municipal election: Mayor of Mali Zvornik
Candidate	Party	First round		Second round	
Candidate	Party	Votes	%	Votes	%
Jovo Rogan	Social Democracy			2,551	51.83
Milan Marković	Serbian Radical Party			2,371	48.17
other candidates					
Total				4,922	100.00

Results of the election for the Municipal Assembly of Mali Zvornik:

Party	Votes	%	Seats
Serbian Radical Party	1,114	20.17	7
Citizens' Groups (four different lists)	924	16.73	4
Social Democracy	894	16.19	6
Democratic Party	872	15.79	5
Socialist Party of Serbia	802	14.52	5
Democratic Party of Serbia	371	6.72	2
G17 Plus	148	2.68	–
Strength of Serbia Movement	138	2.50	–
Serbian Renewal Movement	128	2.32	–
New Serbia	81	1.47	–
New Communist Party of Yugoslavia	50	0.91	–
Total	5,522	100.00	29
Valid votes	5,522	96.76	
Invalid/blank votes	185	3.24	
Total votes	5,707	100.00	
Registered voters/turnout	11,483	49.70	

===== Vladimirci =====
2004 Vladimirci municipal election: Mayor of Vladimirci
Candidate	Party	First round		Second round	
Candidate	Party	Votes	%	Votes	%
Janko Đurić	Democratic Party			4,258	64.95
not listed				2,298	35.05
Vladimir Živković	Serbian Radical Party				
other candidates					
Total				6,556	100.00

Results of the election for the Municipal Assembly of Vladimirci:

Party	Votes	%	Seats
Democratic Party	1,416	20.13	5
Socialist Party of Serbia	1,144	16.27	4
Serbian Radical Party	1,135	16.14	4
Democratic Party of Serbia	1,028	14.62	4
Serbian Renewal Movement–G17 Plus	921	13.10	3
Citizens' Groups (two different lists)	600	8.53	2
Strength of Serbia Movement	434	6.17	2
People's Peasant Party	355	5.05	1
Total	7,033	100.00	25
Valid votes	7,033	96.71	
Invalid/blank votes	239	3.29	
Total votes	7,272	100.00	
Registered voters/turnout	16,833	43.20	

==== Nišava District ====
Local elections were held in the City of Niš, the five constituent municipalities of Niš, and five of the six other municipalities in the Nišava District. The exception was Ražanj, where the last elections had taken place in 2002. In the constituent municipalities of Niš, elections were held for nine-member municipal councils rather than full municipal assemblies.

Smiljko Kostić of New Serbia's political coalition somewhat unexpectedly won the mayoral contest in Niš, defeating Democratic Party incumbent Goran Ćirić in the second round. It was only with difficulty that Kostić established a functional coalition government supported by the assembly, where New Serbia won only four out of sixty-one seats.

The Democratic Party won two of Niš's municipal mayoralties, and a candidate of the Serbian Renewal Movement aligned with the Democratic Party won a third. The Serbian Radical Party and the Democratic Party of Serbia split the remaining two. There was no clear pattern outside the city, where the Radicals won in Aleksinac, a local group aligned with the Strength of Serbia Movement won in Doljevac, the Socialist Party of Serbia won in Gadžin Han, an independent won in Merošina, and G17 Plus won in Svrljig. Generally, there was a trend toward membership of the local assemblies being divided among multiple parties, often with no group holding a clear advantage.

===== Niš =====
2004 City of Niš local election: Mayor of Niš
Candidate	Party	First round		Second round	
Candidate	Party	Votes	%	Votes	%
Smiljko Kostić	Political Organization for Democratic Change "New Serbia"–Velimir Ilić	15,115	23.68	38,291	63.63
Goran Ćirić (incumbent)	Democratic Party–Boris Tadić	18,640	29.21	21,887	36.37
Dragoljub Stamenković	Serbian Radical Party–Tomislav Nikolić	8,220	12.88		
Branislav Jovanović	G17 Plus	6,774	10.61		
Goran Ilić	Democratic Party of Serbia–Vojislav Koštunica	5,356	8.39		
Zoran Bojanić	Strength of Serbia Movement–Bogoljub Karić	4,685	7.34		
Vlastimir Đokić	Socialist Party of Serbia–Tomislav Jovanović	3,692	5.78		
two other candidates		1,342	2.10		
Total		63,824	100.00	60,178	100.00
Valid votes		63,824	97.04		
Invalid/blank votes		1,946	2.96		
Total votes		65,770	100.00		
Registered voters/turnout		220,595	29.81		

Results of the election for the City Assembly of Niš:

Party	Votes	%	Seats
Democratic Party–Boris Tadić	16,392	26.13	18
Serbian Radical Party–Tomislav Nikolić	11,265	17.96	12
Democratic Party of Serbia–Vojislav Koštunica	7,310	11.65	8
G17 Plus	6,480	10.33	7
Strength of Serbia Movement–Bogoljub Karić	6,414	10.22	7
Socialist Party of Serbia–Tomislav Jovanović	4,511	7.19	5
Citizens' Groups (nine different lists)	3,985	6.35	–
Political Organization for Democratic Change "New Serbia"–Velimir Ilić	3,374	5.38	4
Democratic Alternative–Social Democratic Party–Dr. Nebojša Čović	636	1.01	–
Green Party	403	0.64	–
Civic Alliance of Serbia	360	0.57	–
People's Peasant Party	346	0.55	–
Roma Democratic Party	323	0.51	–
People's Democratic Party–Dr. Slobodan Vuksanović	290	0.46	–
Coalition: Liberals of Serbia–Serbian Truth	290	0.46	–
Green Party EKO	144	0.23	–
"Revival"–Miroslav Šolević	106	0.17	–
Party of the Serbian People	105	0.17	–
Total	62,734	100.00	61
Valid votes	62,734	96.24	
Invalid/blank votes	2,450	3.76	
Total votes	65,184	100.00	
Registered voters/turnout	220,595	29.55	

====== Crveni Krst ======
2004 City of Niš local election: Mayor of Crveni Krst
Candidate	Party	First round		Second round	
Candidate	Party	Votes	%	Votes	%
Dragan Bojković	Serbian Radical Party–Tomislav Nikolić	1,187	19.38	4,165	61.93
Slavica Tomić	Democratic Party–Boris Tadić	1,124	18.35	2,560	38.07
Živomir Jovanović	Socialist Party of Serbia	688	11.23		
Vlado Davkovski	G17 Plus–Dr. Miroljub Labus	610	9.96		
Biljana Stanić Jovanović	information missing	581	9.49		
Bogoljub Popović	Democratic Party of Serbia–Vojislav Koštunica	520	8.49		
Aleksandar Radojković	information missing	457	7.46		
Goran Gojković	information missing	373	6.09		
Aleksandar Vulić	information missing	340	5.55		
Muharem Alijević	information missing	148	2.42		
Igor Novaković	information missing	96	1.57		
Total		6,124	100.00	6,725	100.00
Source: The first round totals are likely provisional rather than final.

Results of the election for the Municipal Council of Crveni Krst:

Party	Votes	%	Seats
Serbian Radical Party–Tomislav Nikolić	1,777	23.55	2
Democratic Party–Boris Tadić	1,329	17.61	2
Strength of Serbia Movement–Bogoljub Karić	807	10.69	1
G17 Plus–Dr. Miroljub Labus	801	10.61	1
Citizens' Groups (four different lists)	703	9.31	–
Political Organization for Democratic Change "New Serbia"–Velimir Ilić	686	9.09	1
Democratic Party of Serbia–Vojislav Koštunica	649	8.60	1
Socialist Party of Serbia	643	8.52	1
Democratic Alternative–Social Democratic Party–Dr. Nebojša Čović	95	1.26	–
Political Alliance "Movement for Niš" (Social Democratic Party (SDS), Labour Party of Serbia, Social Democratic Party of Roma of Serbia)	57	0.76	–
Total	7,547	100.00	9
Valid votes	7,547	95.45	
Invalid/blank votes	360	4.55	
Total votes	7,907	100.00	
Registered voters/turnout	28,283	27.96	

====== Medijana ======
2004 City of Niš local election: Mayor of Medijana
Candidate	Party	First round		Second round	
Candidate	Party	Votes	%	Votes	%
Dragoslav Ćirković	Democratic Party–Boris Tadić	8,216	35.15	13,799	59.22
Vlastimir Jovanović	Serbian Radical Party–Tomislav Nikolić	3,585	15.34	9,501	40.78
Rade Arsić	information missing	2,734	11.70		
Miodrag Medar	Democratic Party of Serbia–Vojislav Koštunica	2,565	10.97		
Radosav Tanasković	information missing	2,191	9.37		
Biljana Živković	Socialist Party of Serbia	1,923	8.23		
Dragan Stevanović	Political Organization for Democratic Change New Serbia–Velimir Ilić	1,311	5.61		
Ratko Đenić	information missing	848	3.63		
Total		23,373	100.00	23,300	100.00

Results of the election for the Municipal Council of Medijana:

Party	Votes	%	Seats
Democratic Party–Boris Tadić	8,028	33.04	3
Serbian Radical Party–Tomislav Nikolić	3,863	15.90	2
Democratic Party of Serbia–Vojislav Koštunica	2,782	11.45	1
Strength of Serbia Movement–Bogoljub Karić	2,479	10.20	1
G17 Plus–Dr. Miroljub Labus	2,440	10.04	1
Socialist Party of Serbia	2,025	8.33	1
Political Organization for Democratic Change "New Serbia"–Velimir Ilić	1,309	5.39	–
Citizens' Group: Pure Democracy–Dr. Milan Višnjić	520	2.14	–
Democratic Alternative–Social Democratic Party–Dr. Nebojša Čović	414	1.70	–
Citizens' Group: Coalition for Niš–Miodrag Stanković	308	1.27	–
Political Alliance "Movement for Niš" (Social Democratic Party (SDS), Labour Party of Serbia, Social Democratic Party of Roma of Serbia)	130	0.54	–
Total	24,298	100.00	9
Valid votes	24,298	96.65	
Invalid/blank votes	843	3.35	
Total votes	25,141	100.00	
Registered voters/turnout	80,158	31.36	

====== Niška Banja ======
2004 City of Niš local election: Mayor of Niška Banja
Candidate	Party	First round		Second round	
Candidate	Party	Votes	%	Votes	%
Zoran Vidanović	Democratic Party of Serbia–Vojislav Koštunica	1,598	33.99	2,763	62.58
Aleksandar Mitić	Democratic Party–Boris Tadić	1,017	21.63	1,652	37.42
Goran Živković	Serbian Radical Party–Tomislav Nikolić	718	15.27		
Luka Kostić	G17 Plus	661	14.06		
Miroljub Vidojković	information missing	390	8.29		
Živorad Petković	Socialist Party of Serbia	207	4.40		
Mirosav Živković	Civic Alliance of Serbia	111	2.36		
Total		4,702	100.00	4,415	100.00

Results of the election for the Municipal Council of Niška Banja:

Party	Votes	%	Seats
Democratic Party of Serbia–Vojislav Koštunica	1,313	28.14	3
Democratic Party–Boris Tadić	929	19.91	2
Serbian Radical Party–Tomislav Nikolić	836	17.92	2
G17 Plus–Dr. Miroljub Labus	592	12.69	1
Strength of Serbia Movement–Bogoljub Karić	360	7.72	1
Socialist Party of Serbia	217	4.65	–
Social Democratic Party–Marijana Matić	117	2.51	–
People's Peasant Party	103	2.21	–
Political Organization for Democratic Change "New Serbia"–Velimir Ilić	89	1.91	–
Civic Alliance of Serbia	51	1.09	–
Citizens' Group: Pure Democracy	36	0.77	–
Political Alliance "Movement for Niš" (Social Democratic Party (SDS), Labour Party of Serbia, Social Democratic Party of Roma of Serbia)	23	0.49	–
Total	4,666	100.00	9
Valid votes	4,666	96.68	
Invalid/blank votes	160	3.32	
Total votes	4,826	100.00	
Registered voters/turnout	12,642	38.17	

====== Palilula, Niš ======
2004 City of Niš local election: Mayor of Palilula
Candidate	Party	First round		Second round	
Candidate	Party	Votes	%	Votes	%
Miroslav Đorđević	Serbian Renewal Movement (endorsed by Democratic Party–Boris Tadić)	3,390	26.00	7,438	51.30
Milosav Lukić	Serbian Radical Party–Tomislav Nikolić	2,250	17.26	7,060	48.70
Milan Lapčević	Democratic Party of Serbia–Vojislav Koštunica	1,583	12.14		
Milica Marković	information missing	1,538	11.80		
Aleksandar Milićević	G17 Plus	1,353	10.38		
Miloš Stojković	information missing	858	6.58		
Velibor Petrović	Political Organization for Democratic Change "New Serbia"–Velimir Ilić	801	6.14		
Miodrag Stanković	Citizens' Group: Coalition for Niš–Miodrag Stanković	695	5.33		
Miodrag Mitić	Strength of Serbia Movement–Bogoljub Karić	334	2.56		
Miodrag Mladenović	Democratic Alternative–Social Democratic Party–Dr. Nebojša Čović	234	1.80		
Total		13,036	100.00	14,498	100.00

Đorđević left the Serbian Renewal Movement in November 2007 and joined G17 Plus in March 2008.

Results of the election for the Municipal Council of Palilula, Niš:

Party	Votes	%	Seats
Democratic Party–Boris Tadić	3,878	24.59	2
Serbian Radical Party–Tomislav Nikolić	3,105	19.69	2
Strength of Serbia Movement–Bogoljub Karić	1,777	11.27	1
G17 Plus–Dr. Miroljub Labus	1,766	11.20	1
Democratic Party of Serbia–Vojislav Koštunica	1,671	10.60	1
Socialist Party of Serbia	1,223	7.75	1
Citizens' Groups (three different lists)	1,014	6.43	–
Political Organization for Democratic Change "New Serbia"–Velimir Ilić	992	6.29	1
Democratic Alternative–Social Democratic Party–Dr. Nebojša Čović	197	1.25	–
Political Alliance "Movement for Niš" (Social Democratic Party (SDS), Labour Party of Serbia, Social Democratic Party of Roma of Serbia)	148	0.94	–
Total	15,771	100.00	9
Valid votes	15,771	96.13	
Invalid/blank votes	635	3.87	
Total votes	16,406	100.00	
Registered voters/turnout	61,116	26.84	

====== Pantelej ======
2004 City of Niš local election: Mayor of Pantelej
Candidate	Party	First round		Second round	
Candidate	Party	Votes	%	Votes	%
Bratislav Blagojević	Democratic Party	2,816	28.23	5,017	51.47
Nebojša Lović	Serbian Radical Party–Tomislav Nikolić	1,579	15.83	4,731	48.53
Vlastimir Zdravković	information missing	1,338	13.41		
Miljan Jovanović	Democratic Party of Serbia–Vojislav Koštunica	1,124	11.27		
Siniša Stojanović	G17 Plus	970	9.73		
Slobodan Jovanović	Political Organization for Democratic Change "New Serbia"–Velimir Ilić	792	7.94		
Srbislav Živić	information missing	659	6.61		
Ljubiša Mitić	Citizens' Group: Pantelej–Ljubiša Mitić	604	6.06		
Danijela Milojić	information missing	92	0.92		
Total		9,974	100.00	9,748	100.00

Bratislav Blagojević was expelled from the Democratic Party in June 2005 and later joined G17 Plus.

Results of the election for the Municipal Council of Pantelej:

Party	Votes	%	Seats
Democratic Party–Boris Tadić	2,786	26.39	2
Serbian Radical Party–Tomislav Nikolić	2,023	19.16	2
Strength of Serbia Movement–Bogoljub Karić	1,218	11.54	1
Democratic Party of Serbia–Vojislav Koštunica	1,060	10.04	1
G17 Plus–Dr. Miroljub Labus	987	9.35	1
Citizens' Groups (four different lists)	926	8.77	–
Political Organization for Democratic Change "New Serbia"–Velimir Ilić	772	7.31	1
Socialist Party of Serbia	624	5.91	1
Political Alliance "Movement for Niš" (Social Democratic Party (SDS), Labour Party of Serbia, Social Democratic Party of Roma of Serbia)	86	0.81	–
Democratic Alternative–Social Democratic Party–Dr. Nebojša Čović	75	0.71	–
Total	10,557	100.00	9
Valid votes	10,557	96.68	
Invalid/blank votes	362	3.32	
Total votes	10,919	100.00	
Registered voters/turnout	38,396	28.44	

===== Aleksinac =====
2004 Municipality of Aleksinac local election: Mayor of Aleksinac (second round results)
Candidate	Party	Votes	%
Nenad Stanković	Serbian Radical Party	5,883	52.43
Zoran Aleksić	Citizens' Group: Movement for the Municipality of Aleksinac	5,338	47.57
Total		11,221	100.00

Results of the election for the Municipal Assembly of Aleksinac:

Party	Votes	%	Seats
Serbian Radical Party	4,136	24.51	15
Democratic Party of Serbia	2,109	12.50	8
Citizens' Groups (four different lists)	1,993	11.81	6
Democratic Party	1,814	10.75	7
Socialist Party of Serbia	1,775	10.52	7
Strength of Serbia Movement	1,061	6.29	4
G17 Plus	929	5.51	3
Serbian Renewal Movement	777	4.60	3
Democratic Alternative–Social Democratic Party	578	3.43	2
Socialist People's Party	439	2.60	–
New Serbia	427	2.53	–
People's Peasant Party	274	1.62	–
United Peasant Party	233	1.38	–
Christian Democratic Party of Serbia	139	0.82	–
People's Democratic Party	111	0.66	–
Party of the Serbian People	79	0.47	–
Total	16,874	100.00	55
Valid votes	16,874	96.10	
Invalid/blank votes	684	3.90	
Total votes	17,558	100.00	
Registered voters/turnout	46,269	37.95	

===== Doljevac =====
2004 Municipality of Doljevac local election: Mayor of Doljevac
Candidate	Party	First round		Second round	
Candidate	Party	Votes	%	Votes	%
Goran Ljubić	Strength of Serbia Movement			4,814	51.27
Predrag Stanojević (incumbent)	Socialist Party of Serbia			4,575	48.73
Goran Jocić	Serbian Radical Party				
other candidates					
Total				9,389	100.00

Ljubić later switched his affiliation at the republican level to New Serbia. He was also the leader of a local group called "Movement for the South," which worked in alignment both the Strength of Serbia Movement and New Serbia at different times. There was an effort to initiate a recall vote against Ljubić in 2005, although it is not clear from online reports if the initiative made it to a vote.

Results of the election for the Municipal Assembly of Doljevac:

Party	Votes	%	Seats
Socialist Party of Serbia	3,066	30.26	12
Citizens' Groups (three different lists)	1,994	19.68	7
Strength of Serbia Movement	1,312	12.95	5
Serbian Radical Party	1,276	12.59	5
Social Democratic Party	813	8.02	3
Democratic Party and Serbian Renewal Movement	757	7.47	3
Democratic Party of Serbia	445	4.39	2
New Serbia	255	2.52	–
G17 Plus	214	2.11	–
Total	10,132	100.00	37
Valid votes	10,132	96.20	
Invalid/blank votes	400	3.80	
Total votes	10,532	100.00	
Registered voters/turnout	15,003	70.20	

Subsequent elections were held in Doljevac on 1 October 2006 to elect members of the municipal assembly. The results do not appear to be available online. Goran Ljubić's status as mayor was not affected, and the next subsequent assembly elections took place as part of the regular cycle in 2008.

===== Gadžin Han =====
2004 Municipality of Gadžin Han local election: Mayor of Gadžin Han
Candidate	Party	First round		Second round	
Candidate	Party	Votes	%	Votes	%
Saša Đorđević	Socialist Party of Serbia, Liberals of Serbia, and People's Peasant Party			2,553	52.28
Siniša Grozdanović	Citizens' Group: Zaplanje My Home			2,330	47.72
Dragan Sretenović	Serbian Radical Party				
other candidates					
Total				4,883	100.00

Results of the election for the Municipal Assembly of Gadžin Han:

Party	Votes	%	Seats
Socialist Party of Serbia	1,331	27.49	12
Citizens' Groups (two different lists)	952	19.67	8
Serbian Radical Party	668	13.80	6
Democratic Party of Serbia	461	9.52	4
Strength of Serbia Movement	415	8.57	4
Democratic Party	280	5.78	3
G17 Plus	262	5.41	2
Liberals of Serbia	241	4.98	2
Serbian Renewal Movement	231	4.77	2
Total	4,841	100.00	43
Valid votes	4,841	94.55	
Invalid/blank votes	279	5.45	
Total votes	5,120	100.00	
Registered voters/turnout	9,122	56.13	

===== Merošina =====
2004 Municipality of Merošina local election: Mayor of Merošina
Candidate	Party	First round		Second round	
Candidate	Party	Votes	%	Votes	%
Goran Mikić	Citizens' Group: Finally, a Real Man			3,544	52.19
Goran Lazić	Socialist Party of Serbia			3,247	47.81
Dejan Veljković	Serbian Radical Party				
other candidates					
Total				6,791	100.00

Results of the election for the Municipal Assembly of Merošina:

Party	Votes	%	Seats
Socialist Party of Serbia	2,045	27.54	11
Citizens' Groups (six different lists)	1,967	26.49	9
Serbian Radical Party	1,023	13.78	6
Democratic Party of Serbia	632	8.51	3
Strength of Serbia Movement	480	6.46	3
Coalition: Serbian Renewal Movement–Christian Democratic Party of Serbia	449	6.05	2
Democratic Party	438	5.90	2
New Serbia	264	3.56	1
G17 Plus	128	1.72	–
Total	7,426	100.00	37
Valid votes	7,426	95.35	
Invalid/blank votes	362	4.65	
Total votes	7,788	100.00	
Registered voters/turnout	11,758	66.24	

Future parliamentarian Sanja Miladinović was one of the Democratic Party's two elected representatives.

===== Ražanj =====
There were no municipal elections in Ražanj in 2004. The previous elections had taken place in 2002-03, and the next elections took place in 2006.

===== Svrljig =====
2004 Municipality of Svrljig local election: Mayor of Svrljig
Candidate	Party	First round		Second round	
Candidate	Party	Votes	%	Votes	%
Saša Golubović (incumbent)	G17 Plus		18.71	3,408	62.88
Radiša Savić	Socialist Party of Serbia		13.90	2,012	37.12
Vlastimir Milkić	Movement for Svrljig "New Serbia"		12.50		
Aleksandar Batanjac	Citizens' Group: Sloga				
Slavica Božinović	Democratic Party				
Mariola Gagić	Citizens' Group				
Srbislav Đorđević	Serbian Radical Party				
Mašan Jovanović	Serbian Renewal Movement				
Zoran Lazarević	Strength of Serbia Movement–Bogoljub Karić				
Milinko Marković	Democratic Party of Serbia				
Milija Miletić	United Peasant Party				
Srboljub Milovanović	Citizens' Group				
Gordon Perić	Citizens' Group				
Vlastimir Petrović	Citizens' Group: Radoš Božinović				
Total				5,420	100.00

Results of the election for the Municipal Assembly of Svrljig:

Party	Votes	%	Seats
Citizens' Groups (four different lists)	1,254	19.40	8
United Peasant Party	951	14.71	6
Socialist Party of Serbia	905	14.00	6
Democratic Party of Serbia	669	10.35	4
Serbian Radical Party	569	8.80	4
Democratic Party	530	8.20	3
G17 Plus	418	6.47	3
Serbian Renewal Movement	390	6.03	3
Strength of Serbia Movement	196	3.03	–
Social Democratic Party	191	2.95	–
Party of Serbian Unity	175	2.71	–
Liberals of Serbia	127	1.96	–
Revival of Serbia	89	1.38	–
Total	6,464	100.00	37
Valid votes	6,464	98.43	
Invalid/blank votes	103	1.57	
Total votes	6,567	100.00	
Registered voters/turnout	14,711	44.64	

==== Podunavlje District ====
Local elections were held in the one city (Smederevo) and the two other municipalities of the Podunavlje District. The Democratic Party won the greatest number of seats in both Smederevo and Smederevska Palanka but did not win the mayoralty in either community; independent candidate Jasna Avramović won in the former community, while Radoslav Cokić won in the latter. The Democratic Party of Serbia won in Velika Plana.

===== Smederevo =====
2004 Municipality of Smederevo local election: Mayor of Smederevo
Candidate	Party	First round		Second round	
Candidate	Party	Votes	%	Votes	%
Jasna Avramović	Citizens' Group: Movement for Smederevo–Dr. Jasna Avramović			11,359	55.78
Dobrica Janković	Democratic Party–Boris Tadić			9,004	44.22
Ljubomir Kapsarev	G17 Plus–Miroljub Labus				
Slobodan Miladinović (incumbent)	Democratic Party of Serbia–Dr. Vojislav Koštunica				
Zoran Mišeljić	Strength of Serbia Movement–Bogoljub Karić				
Dobrivoje Petrović	Serbian Radical Party–Tomislav Nikolić				
Branče Stojanović	Socialist Party of Serbia				
Hranislav Virijević	People's Democratic Party–Dr. Slobodan Vuksanović				
other candidates					
Total				20,363	100.00

Jasna Avramović was defeated in a recall election in 2005. A by-election to choose her successor took place in early 2006.

Results of the election for the Municipal Assembly of Smederevo:

Party	Votes	%	Seats
Democratic Party–Boris Tadić	5,797	20.32	16
Democratic Party of Serbia–Dr. Vojislav Koštunica	4,310	15.11	12
Serbian Radical Party–Tomislav Nikolić	4,301	15.08	12
Citizens' Groups (four different lists)	3,881	13.60	9
Socialist Party of Serbia	3,470	12.16	10
Strength of Serbia Movement–Bogoljub Karić	3,087	10.82	8
Serbian Renewal Movement and Coalition: Smederevo Must Move Forward (Civic Alliance of Serbia, Democratic Alternative, Social Democratic Party)	1,104	3.87	3
G17 Plus–Miroljub Labus	790	2.77	–
New Serbia–Velimir Ilić	777	2.72	–
Smederevo Democratic Party	457	1.60	–
People's Democratic Party–Dr. Slobodan Vuksanović	304	1.07	–
League of Communists of Yugoslavia in Serbia	186	0.65	–
League of Social Democrats of Vojvodina	64	0.22	–
Total	28,528	100.00	70
Valid votes	28,528	95.95	
Invalid/blank votes	1,204	4.05	
Total votes	29,732	100.00	
Registered voters/turnout	94,667	31.41	

===== Smederevska Palanka =====
2004 Municipality of Smederevska Palanka local election: Mayor of Smederevska Palanka (second round results)
Candidate	Party	First round		Second round	
Candidate	Party	Votes	%	Votes	%
Radoslav Cokić	Coalition: Serbian Renewal Movement–New Serbia–Dr. Dušan Narić			10,235	60.97
Radoslav Ljubisavljević (incumbent)	Democratic Party–Boris Tadić			6,551	39.03
Goran Pirivatrić	Serbian Radical Party–Tomislav Nikolić				
other candidates					
Total				16,786	100.00

Results of the election for the Municipal Assembly of Smederevska Palanka:

Party	Votes	%	Seats
Democratic Party–Boris Tadić	3,338	19.16	11
Citizens' Groups (eight different lists)	2,600	14.93	4
Coalition: Serbian Renewal Movement–New Serbia–Dr. Dušan Narić	2,495	14.32	8
Serbian Radical Party–Tomislav Nikolić	2,137	12.27	7
Socialist Party of Serbia	1,931	11.09	6
Democratic Party of Serbia	1,636	9.39	5
Strength of Serbia Movement–Bogoljub Karić	1,378	7.91	4
Democratic Centre of Serbia–Serbian Liberal Party	648	3.72	2
G17 Plus–Miroljub Labus	647	3.71	2
Socialist People's Party	478	2.74	–
Christian Democratic Party of Serbia	130	0.75	–
Total	17,418	100.00	49
Valid votes	17,418	95.97	
Invalid/blank votes	731	4.03	
Total votes	18,149	100.00	
Registered voters/turnout	46,113	39.36	

===== Velika Plana =====
2004 Municipality of Velika Plana local election: Mayor of Velika Plana
Candidate	Party	First round		Second round	
Candidate	Party	Votes	%	Votes	%
Dejan Šulkić	Democratic Party of Serbia			5,767	62.09
Nebojša Todorović	Democratic Party			3,521	37.91
Slobodan Milosavljević	Serbian Radical Party				
other candidates					
Total				9,288	100.00

Results of the election for the Municipal Assembly of Velika Plana:

Party	Votes	%	Seats
Democratic Party of Serbia	2,680	20.83	9
Democratic Party	2,427	18.86	8
Socialist Party of Serbia	1,927	14.98	6
Serbian Radical Party	1,896	14.73	6
Strength of Serbia Movement	954	7.41	3
Coalition: Serbian Renewal Movement and New Serbia	846	6.57	3
Citizens' Groups (three different lists)	631	4.90	–
G17 Plus	572	4.45	2
Coalition: For Our Place (Socialist People's Party–Liberals of Serbia)	419	3.26	1
United Serbia	412	3.20	1
Party of Serbian Unity	104	0.81	–
Total	12,868	100.00	39
Valid votes	12,868	96.30	
Invalid/blank votes	494	3.70	
Total votes	13,362	100.00	
Registered voters/turnout	38,483	34.72	

==== Pomoravlje District ====
Elections were held in four of the six municipalities of the Pomoravlje District. The exceptions were Despotovac, which had elected a mayor and assembly members in 2002, and Ćuprija, which had done so in 2003. The newly formed United Serbia party won a significant victory in its home base of Jagodina, and independent populist Dobrivoje Budimirović (formerly of the Socialist Party of Serbia) won a first-round victory in Svilajnac. The Democratic Party won in Paraćin, and a former Democrat aligned with the Serbian Renewal Movement won the mayoral election in Rekovac.

===== Jagodina =====
2004 Municipality of Jagodina local election: Mayor of Jagodina
Candidate	Party	First round		Second round	
Candidate	Party	Votes	%	Votes	%
Dragan Marković Palma	United Serbia			18,756	67.01
Snežana Mitrović	Democratic Party			9,234	32.99
Slavoljub Filipović	Serbian Renewal Movement				
Desimir Milenković	Serbian Radical Party				
other candidates					
Total				27,990	100.00

Results of the election for the Municipal Assembly of Jagodina:

Party	Votes	%	Seats
United Serbia–Dragan Marković Palma	8,775	33.74	16
Democratic Party–Boris Tadić	3,969	15.26	8
Coalition: Democratic Party of Serbia and People's Democratic Party	2,331	8.96	4
Citizens' Groups (seven different lists)	2,254	8.67	2
Serbian Radical Party–Tomislav Nikolić	1,769	6.80	3
G17 Plus–Miroljub Labus	1,540	5.92	3
Serbian Renewal Movement–Slavoljub Filipović	1,338	5.14	3
Socialist Party of Serbia	1,287	4.95	2
Strength of Serbia Movement–Bogoljub Karić	801	3.08	–
Liberals of Serbia–Petar Jaksić	572	2.20	–
Citizens' Group–New Serbia	509	1.96	–
Social Democratic Party	368	1.41	–
Christian Democratic Party of Serbia	185	0.71	–
Socialist People's Party	132	0.51	–
Moravian League	98	0.38	–
New Communist Party of Yugoslavia	81	0.31	–
Total	26,009	100.00	41
Valid votes	26,009	96.39	
Invalid/blank votes	974	3.61	
Total votes	26,983	100.00	
Registered voters/turnout	61,467	43.90	

Petar Petrović of United Serbia was elected to the Jagodina municipal assembly and served afterward on the municipal council (i.e., the executive branch of government).

===== Ćuprija =====
There were no municipal elections in Ćuprija in 2004. The previous elections had taken place in 2003, and the next elections appear to have taken place in 2008.

===== Despotovac =====
There were no municipal elections in Despotovac in 2004. The previous elections had taken place in 2002, and the next elections took place in 2006.

===== Paraćin =====
2004 Municipality of Paraćin local election: Mayor of Paraćin (second round results)
Candidate	Party	Votes	%
Saša Paunović	Democratic Party	9,576	58.80
Zoran Stojanović	Serbian Radical Party	6,711	41.20
Total		16,287	100.00

Results of the election for the Municipal Assembly of Paraćin:

Party	Votes	%	Seats
Democratic Party	6,816	30.51	18
Serbian Radical Party	3,736	16.72	10
Citizens' Groups (five different lists)	3,493	15.63	8
G17 Plus	1,834	8.21	5
Serbian Renewal Movement	1,721	7.70	5
Strength of Serbia Movement	1,300	5.82	3
Socialist Party of Serbia	1,173	5.25	3
Democratic Party of Serbia	979	4.38	3
United Serbia	629	2.82	–
Social Democratic Party	335	1.50	–
New Serbia–People's Democratic Party	176	0.79	–
Republican Union	150	0.67	–
Total	22,342	100.00	55
Valid votes	22,342	97.03	
Invalid/blank votes	685	2.97	
Total votes	23,027	100.00	
Registered voters/turnout	49,877	46.17	

===== Rekovac =====
2004 Municipality of Rekovac local election: Mayor of Rekovac
Candidate	Party	First round		Second round	
Candidate	Party	Votes	%	Votes	%
Dr. Pavle Mijajlović (incumbent)	Coalition: Serbian Renewal Movement and Citizens' Group: For Levač (Affiliation: For Levač)			4,315	61.52
Dragoslav Jovanović	Democratic Party			2,699	38.48
Jagoš Kuburović	Serbian Radical Party				
other candidates					
Total				7,014	100.00

Results of the election for the Municipal Assembly of Rekovac:

Party	Votes	%	Seats
Democratic Party	1,684	23.90	8
Citizens' Groups (two different lists)	1,038	14.73	5
Socialist Party of Serbia	858	12.18	4
Serbian Renewal Movement	717	10.17	4
Serbian Radical Party	668	9.48	3
People's Democratic Party	604	8.57	3
New Serbia	385	5.46	2
Democratic Party of Serbia	378	5.36	2
Strength of Serbia Movement	258	3.66	1
Social Democratic Party	243	3.45	1
G17 Plus	214	3.04	–
Total	7,047	100.00	33
Valid votes	7,047	95.45	
Invalid/blank votes	336	4.55	
Total votes	7,383	100.00	
Registered voters/turnout	11,639	63.43	

===== Svilajnac =====
2004 Svilajnac municipal election: Mayor of Svilajnac
Candidate	Party	Votes	%
Dobrivoje Budimirović	Citizens' Group: For a Rich Municipality of Svilajnac	7,127	55.85
Milija Jovanović (incumbent)	Democratic Party	1,624	12.73
Gorica Gajić	Democratic Party of Serbia	1,579	12.37
Mića Nešić	G17 Plus	852	6.68
Branislav Marinković	Serbian Renewal Movement–Citizen's Group: Successful People for a Successful Municipality	794	6.22
Radovan Radosavljević	Strength of Serbia Movement	440	3.45
Staniša Strainović	Socialist Party of Serbia	232	1.82
Ljubiša Radosavljević	People's Democratic Party–Democratic Movement of Romanians of Serbia	114	0.89
Total		12,762	100.00

Gorica Gajić was chosen as the municipality's deputy mayor after the election. Budimirović won a recall election in 2007.

Results of the election for the Municipal Assembly of Svilajnac:

Party	Votes	%	Seats
Citizens' Group: For a Rich Municipality of Svilajnac	4,902	38.97	19
Democratic Party	2,216	17.62	8
Democratic Party of Serbia	1,586	12.61	6
Coalition: Serbian Renewal Movement and Citizens' Group: Successful People for a Successful Municipality	787	6.26	3
G17 Plus	745	5.92	3
Serbian Radical Party	713	5.67	3
Socialist Party of Serbia	699	5.56	3
Strength of Serbia Movement	652	5.18	2
Coalition: NDS and Democratic Movement of Romanians of Serbia	216	1.72	–
New Serbia	64	0.51	–
Total	12,580	100.00	47
Valid votes	12,580	95.56	
Invalid/blank votes	584	4.44	
Total votes	13,164	100.00	
Registered voters/turnout	26,400	49.86	

==== Raška District ====
Local elections were held in four of the five municipalities of the Raška District. The exception was Kraljevo, the capital, where the previous election had taken place in 2003.

The List for Sandžak coalition won the elections in the predominantly Bosniak municipalities of Novi Pazar and Tutin. It failed to win a majority in the Novi Pazar assembly, however, and the rival Sandžak Democratic Party was able to form a coalition administration with other parties in the assembly.

The Socialist Party of Serbia won in Raška, and an independent list led by a former Socialist won in Vrnjačka Banja.

===== Kraljevo =====
There were no municipal elections in Kraljevo in 2004. The previous mayoral and assembly elections had taken place in 2003, the next mayoral election took place in 2006, and the next assembly elections appear to have taken place in 2008.

===== Novi Pazar =====
2004 Municipality of Novi Pazar local election: Mayor of Novi Pazar
Candidate	Party	First round		Second round	
Candidate	Party	Votes	%	Votes	%
Sulejman Ugljanin	Coalition: List for Sandžak Dr. Sulejman Ugljanin (Affiliation: Party of Democratic Action of Sandžak)	14,147	42.87	18,863	52.33
Sait Kačapor	SDP–Rasim Ljajić	10,624	32.19	17,180	47.67
Fevzija Murić	Party for Sandžak Dr. Fevzija Murić	2,373	7.19		
Milan Veselinović	Serbian Radical Party–Tomislav Nikolić	2,127	6.45		
Milutin Cvetić	Serb Democratic Alliance – Coalition: DSS, Citizens' Group, SPS, SPO, NS, DA, SSJ, DHSS	1,618	4.90		
Tarik Imamović Dip. Ing. El. Teh.	Sandžak Alternative	702	2.13		
Ruždija Agušević	Citizens' Group	518	1.57		
Dragić Pavlović	Strength of Serbia Movement	353	1.07		
Mehmed Slezović	G17 Plus	289	0.88		
Zehnija Bulić	Sandžak Democratic Union	250	0.76		
Total		33,001	100.00	36,043	100.00

Results of the election for the Municipal Assembly of Novi Pazar:

Party	Votes	%	Seats
Coalition: List for Sandžak Dr. Sulejman Ugljanin	13,572	40.98	21
SDP–Rasim Ljajić	10,766	32.51	17
Serbian Radical Party–Tomislav Nikolić	2,202	6.65	4
Party for Sandžak Dr. Fevzija Murić	2,155	6.51	3
Serb Democratic Alliance – Coalition: DSS, Citizens' Group, SPS, SPO, NS, DA, SSJ, DHSS	1,217	3.67	2
Democratic Party–Boris Tadić	927	2.80	–
Sandžak Alternative Dr. Fadil Skrijelj	740	2.23	–
Sandžak Democratic Union–Dr. Rešad Hazirović	533	1.61	–
G17 Plus–Miroljub Labus	368	1.11	–
Coalition: Srpska Sloga	303	0.91	–
Strength of Serbia Movement	268	0.81	–
Sandžak People's Movement (NPS)–Džemail Suljević	67	0.20	–
Total	33,118	100.00	47
Valid votes	33,118	97.36	
Invalid/blank votes	897	2.64	
Total votes	34,015	100.00	
Registered voters/turnout	66,064	51.49	

On 11 September 2004, violence broke out between supporters of the Party of Democratic Action of Sandžak (SDA) and the Sandžak Democratic Party (SDP), and two passers-by were injured by gunfire in the ensuing melee. Both parties accused the other of having caused the situation.

Ahmedin Škrijelj of the SDA appeared in the thirty-first position on the List for Sandžak's list and was awarded one of its "optional" mandates. Mirza Hajdinović, also of the SDA, appeared in the thirteenth position on the same list and did not receive a mandate.

Although Sulejman Ugljanin won the mayoral election, the Sandžak Democratic Party was able to form a coalition government with the Serbian Radical Party, the Party for Sandžak, and the Serb Democratic Alliance. Ugljanin refused to accept the legitimacy of the SDP's government and tried to set up a parallel administration. Serbia's ministry of state administration and local self-government ultimately recognized the SDP's rule as legitimate, and there were various efforts to resolve the situation. Both the election violence and the divided nature of the city's government led to an extremely tense atmosphere in the municipality.

The government of Serbia introduced a provisional administration to Novi Pazar on 7 April 2006 on the grounds that the assembly did not adopt a budget within the legal deadline. A new assembly election was scheduled for 10 September 2006. Zekirija Dugopoljac of the Reformists of Sandžak was appointed to lead a five-member provisional council responsible for carrying out the work of the assembly. Škrijelj was one of the council's members.

At the time this happened, there was already an effort underway to recall Ugljanin as mayor. The effort ended in chaos, with two separate votes taking place. The first recall election, held on 14 May 2006, was organized by an election commission appointed by the former SDP-led administration. In this vote, ninety-eight per cent of voters supported recall. The second election, held on 25 June 2006, was held by a commission appointed by the interim government, and in this vote about ninety-seven per cent of voters opposed recall. Ultimately, Ugljanin was not removed from office.

===== Raška =====
2004 Municipality of Raška local election: Mayor of Raška (second round results)
Candidate	Party	Votes	%
Bojan Milovanović	Socialist Party of Serbia	5,264	56.11
Milan Pejčinović	Strength of Serbia Movement	4,118	43.89
Total		9,382	100.00

Results of the election for the Municipal Assembly of Raška:

Party	Votes	%	Seats
Socialist Party of Serbia	2,484	25.86	10
Serbian Radical Party	1,506	15.68	6
Strength of Serbia Movement	1,302	13.55	5
Democratic Party	1,065	11.09	4
Democratic Party of Serbia	993	10.34	4
Liberals of Serbia	506	5.27	2
Citizens' Groups (two different lists)	496	5.16	1
G17 Plus	410	4.27	2
Christian Democratic Party of Serbia	340	3.54	1
Serbian Renewal Movement	287	2.99	–
New Serbia	91	0.95	–
Party of Serbian Unity	85	0.88	–
Patriotic Party of the Diaspora	41	0.43	–
Total	9,606	100.00	35
Valid votes	9,606	96.87	
Invalid/blank votes	310	3.13	
Total votes	9,916	100.00	
Registered voters/turnout	21,544	46.03	

===== Tutin =====
2004 Municipality of Tutin local election: Mayor of Tutin
Candidate	Party	Votes	%
Šemsudin Kučević	List for Sandžak (Affiliation: Party of Democratic Action of Sandžak)	8,588	59.33
Mujo Muković	Sandžak Democratic Party	2,882	19.91
Šerif Hamzagić	G17 Plus	1,226	8.47
Sead Ademović	Strength of Serbia Movement	820	5.66
Mithat Eminović	People's Movement of Sandžak	809	5.59
Osman Bejtović	Citizens' Group	151	1.04
Total		14,476	100.00

Results of the election for the Municipal Assembly of Tutin:

Party	Votes	%	Seats
Coalition: List for Sandžak	8,324	57.75	22
Sandžak Democratic Party	3,102	21.52	8
Sandžak People's Movement	681	4.72	2
G17 Plus	616	4.27	2
Democratic Party–Boris Tadić	586	4.07	2
Strength of Serbia Movement	456	3.16	1
Citizens' Groups (two different lists)	257	1.78	–
Party for Sandžak	219	1.52	–
Democratic Party of Serbia	172	1.19	–
Total	14,413	100.00	37
Valid votes	14,413	97.84	
Invalid/blank votes	318	2.16	
Total votes	14,731	100.00	
Registered voters/turnout	26,755	55.06	

Bajro Gegić of the Party of Democratic Action of Sandžak was chosen as deputy mayor after the election and served in the role for the next four years.

===== Vrnjačka Banja =====
2004 Municipality of Vrnjačka Banja local election: Mayor of Vrnjačka Banja
Candidate	Party	Votes	%
Rodoljub Džamić	Citizens' Group: We Know How	6,935	61.82
Mateja Mijatović (incumbent)	Democratic Party	4,283	38.18
Radoslav Erdoglić	Serbian Radical Party		
Total		11,218	100.00

Results of the election for the Municipal Assembly of Vrnjačka Banja:

Party	Votes	%	Seats
Citizens' Group (nine different lists)	3,656	32.62	11
Democratic Party of Serbia	1,690	15.08	6
Democratic Party	1,632	14.56	5
Serbian Radical Party	1,356	12.10	4
Socialist Party of Serbia	727	6.49	2
Serbian Renewal Movement	545	4.86	2
Socialist People's Party	535	4.77	2
G17 Plus	358	3.19	1
New Serbia	333	2.97	–
Strength of Serbia Movement	318	2.84	–
New Communist Party of Yugoslavia	31	0.28	–
People's Democratic Party	28	0.25	–
Total	11,209	100.00	33
Valid votes	11,209	96.38	
Invalid/blank votes	421	3.62	
Total votes	11,630	100.00	
Registered voters/turnout	22,642	51.36	

==== Šumadija District ====
Local elections were held in all seven of the Šumadija District's municipalities. The Serbian Renewal Movement won the mayoral contests in four jurisdictions (including Kragujevac), either on its own or in alliance with other parties. The Democratic Party won in Batočina, and a party candidate also won in Knić in alliance with the Serbian Renewal Movement. The Serbian Radical Party won in Aranđelovac, while a Democratic Party of Serbia–New Serbia alliance won in Topola.

===== Kragujevac =====
2004 City of Kragujevac local election: Mayor of Kragujevac
Candidate	Party	First round		Second round	
Candidate	Party	Votes	%	Votes	%
Veroljub Stevanović Verko	Together for Kragujevac	22,032	38.59	32,610	73.72
Dragutin Radosavljević	Democratic Party–Boris Tadić	9,856	17.26	11,624	26.28
Slavica Đukić Dejanović	Socialist Party of Serbia	6,232	10.92		
Mileta Poskurica	Serbian Radical Party–Tomislav Nikolić	5,822	10.20		
Dragan Bataveljić	Strength of Serbia Movement–Bogoljub Karić	3,288	5.76		
Goran Davidović	Democratic Party of Serbia–Vojislav Koštunica	2,899	5.08		
Vladan Vučićević	New Serbia	2,479	4.34		
Dobrica Milovanović	For Our City	2,253	3.95		
Miroslav Marinković	G17 Plus–Miroljub Labus	1,094	1.92		
Radiša Pavlović	Workers' Resistance	574	1.01		
Branislav Kovačević Cole	League for Šumadija	562	0.98		
Total		57,091	100.00	44,234	100.00

Results of the election for the Municipal Assembly of Kragujevac:

Party	Votes	%	Seats
Together for Kragujevac–Veroljub Verko Stevanović (Serbian Renewal Movement, Social Democracy, People's Democratic Party)	16,091	28.47	28
Democratic Party–Boris Tadić	10,539	18.65	18
Serbian Radical Party–Tomislav Nikolić	7,191	12.72	13
Socialist Party of Serbia–Obren Ćetković Ćetko	4,485	7.94	8
Democratic Party of Serbia–Dr. Vojislav Koštunica	3,676	6.50	6
Strength of Serbia Movement–Bogoljub Karić	2,750	4.87	5
For Our City–Prof. Dr. Dobrica Milovanović (Liberals of Serbia, Citizens' Group, Labour Party of Serbia)	2,738	4.84	5
New Serbia–Vladan Vučićević	2,146	3.80	4
G17 Plus–Miroljub Labus	1,685	2.98	–
Citizens' Group: Pensioners of Kragujevac	1,035	1.83	–
My Capital City–Branislav Kovačević Cole (League for Šumadija)	752	1.33	–
Workers' Resistance–Radiša Pavlović	687	1.22	–
Social Democratic Party (Socijaldemokratska stranka)–Dragoljub Slović Leka	409	0.72	–
Democratic Alternative–Social Democratic Party (Socijaldemokratska partija) Dr. Nebojša Čović	408	0.72	–
Citizens' Group: I Love Kragujevac–Jevđa Jevđević	289	0.51	–
Citizens' Group: Kragujevac Resistance	285	0.50	–
Citizens' Group: Differently Equal–Milan Grbović	231	0.41	–
Citizens' Group: Na prvom mestu naše mesto–Zoran Marković - Vulkanizer	186	0.33	–
Citizens' Group: For a Better Tomorrow–Roma from Kragujevac–Nataša Nikolić	183	0.32	–
Citizens' Group: Forgotten Beloševac–Zoran Jokić	181	0.32	–
Citizens' Group: Toma Todorović	176	0.31	–
Citizens' Group: Health Is Our Greatest Asset–Mališa Varjačić	112	0.20	–
Citizens' Group: Peli Rosić - Petrovac	89	0.16	–
Citizens' Group: For the Better	75	0.13	–
Citizens' Group: Sloga–Milan Prokić	53	0.09	–
Citizens' Group: For a Better Kragujevac and Šumadija	34	0.06	–
Citizens' Group: Initiative for a Better Kragujevac	32	0.06	–
Total	56,518	100.00	87
Valid votes	56,518	97.63	
Invalid/blank votes	1,373	2.37	
Total votes	57,891	100.00	
Registered voters/turnout	145,740	39.72	

Parliamentarian Nataša Jovanović was elected from the lead position on the Serbian Radical Party's list.

===== Aranđelovac =====
2004 Municipality of Aranđelovac local election: Mayor of Aranđelovac (second round results)
Candidate	Party	Votes	%
Radosav Švabić	Serbian Radical Party	6,272	54.21
Dimitrije Jovanović Mita	Democratic Party–Serbian Renewal Movement	5,297	45.79
Total		11,569	100.00

Results of the election for the Municipal Assembly of Aranđelovac:

Party	Votes	%	Seats
Serbian Radical Party	3,487	24.56	11
Democratic Party of Serbia	2,533	17.84	8
Democratic Party–Serbian Renewal Movement	2,481	17.47	8
Socialist Party of Serbia	1,827	12.87	6
Citizens' Groups (six different lists)	1,056	7.44	–
New Serbia	1,015	7.15	3
G17 Plus	793	5.58	3
Strength of Serbia Movement	705	4.96	2
New Democratic Party of Roma of Serbia	215	1.51	–
Peasant Party of Serbia	88	0.62	–
Total	14,200	100.00	41
Valid votes	14,200	96.88	
Invalid/blank votes	458	3.12	
Total votes	14,658	100.00	
Registered voters/turnout	37,833	38.74	

===== Batočina =====
2004 Municipality of Batočina local election: Mayor of Batočina
Candidate	Party	First round		Second round	
Candidate	Party	Votes	%	Votes	%
Radiša Milošević	Democratic Party			3,228	61.22
Srđan Biorac	Coalition: For Batočina (SPO, NS, and League for Šumadija)			2,045	38.78
Vlasta Kovinić	Serbian Radical Party				
other candidates					
Total				5,273	100.00

Results of the election for the Municipal Assembly of Batočina:

Party	Votes	%	Seats
Democratic Party	1,587	27.10	10
Coalition: For Batočina (SPO, NS, and League for Šumadija)	964	16.46	6
Serbian Radical Party	737	12.59	5
Democratic Party of Serbia	672	11.48	4
Strength of Serbia Movement	410	7.00	3
Socialist Party of Serbia	391	6.68	2
Coalition: United Serbia, DHSS, GSS	295	5.04	2
Citizens' Group: Salvation for the Municipality of Batočina	265	4.53	2
G17 Plus	239	4.08	–
Ravna Gora Movement	173	2.95	–
Socialist People's Party	123	2.10	–
Total	5,856	100.00	34
Valid votes	5,856	96.28	
Invalid/blank votes	226	3.72	
Total votes	6,082	100.00	
Registered voters/turnout	10,267	59.24	

===== Knić =====
2004 Municipality of Knić local election: Mayor of Knić
Candidate	Party	First round		Second round	
Candidate	Party	Votes	%	Votes	%
Bratislav Nikolić	Coalition: Serbian Renewal Movement and New Serbia			3,206	54.95
information missing				2,628	45.05
Mileta Marinković	Serbian Radical Party				
other candidates					
Total				5,834	100.00

Results of the election for the Municipal Assembly of Knić:

Party	Votes	%	Seats
Citizens' Groups (three different lists)	1,505	25.35	8
Coalition: Serbian Renewal Movement and New Serbia	1,001	16.86	6
Democratic Party of Serbia	808	13.61	5
Democratic Party	778	13.10	4
Socialist Party of Serbia	662	11.15	4
Serbian Radical Party	629	10.59	3
Strength of Serbia Movement	309	5.20	2
G17 Plus	245	4.13	1
Total	5,937	100.00	33
Valid votes	5,937	95.56	
Invalid/blank votes	276	4.44	
Total votes	6,213	100.00	
Registered voters/turnout	12,822	48.46	

===== Lapovo =====
2004 Municipality of Lapovo local election: Mayor of Lapovo
Candidate	Party	First round		Second round	
Candidate	Party	Votes	%	Votes	%
Dragan Zlatković	Serbian Renewal Movement	936	25.68	2,389	72.95
Borivoje Jelenković	Democratic Party	642	17.61	886	27.05
Zlatko Radić	Serbian Radical Party	603	16.54		
Dragan Mikić	Citizens' Group: For Lapovo	384	10.53		
Dragan Petković	Socialist Party of Serbia	282	7.74		
Miroslav Jovanović	Strength of Serbia Movement	171	4.69		
Ratomir Kojanic	Democratic Party of Serbia	163	4.47		
Dragutin Dostanić	Liberals of Serbia–Movement for Lapovo	144	3.95		
Miladin Džinović	G17 Plus	102	2.80		
Veroljub Milojković	Citizens' Group: Revival of Lapovo	89	2.44		
Sašimir Gajić	Party of Serbian Unity	71	1.95		
Dragan Lazarević	Citizens' Group: Delom na Videlo	58	1.59		
Total		3,645	100.00	3,275	100.00

Results of the election for the Municipal Assembly of Lapovo:

Party	Votes	%	Seats
Serbian Radical Party–Tomislav Nikolić	717	19.77	6
Serbian Renewal Movement	686	18.91	6
Democratic Party–Boris Tadić	625	17.23	5
Socialist Party of Serbia–Ljutica Krstić	394	10.86	3
Citizens' Group: For Lapovo–Dragan Mikić	360	9.93	3
Democratic Party of Serbia–Vojislav Koštunica	334	9.21	3
Strength of Serbia Movement–Bogoljub Karić	210	5.79	2
Liberals of Serbia–Prešić Radoslav Rade	130	3.58	1
G17 Plus–Miroljub Labus	95	2.62	–
Party of Serbian Unity–Prof. Ljubiša Gajić	76	2.10	–
Total	3,627	100.00	29
Valid votes	3,627	96.77	
Invalid/blank votes	121	3.23	
Total votes	3,748	100.00	
Registered voters/turnout	7,161	52.34	

===== Rača =====
2004 Municipality of Rača local election: Mayor of Rača
Candidate	Party	First round		Second round	
Candidate	Party	Votes	%	Votes	%
Dragan Stevanović	Serbian Renewal Movement–Democratic Party (Affiliation: Democratic Party)	1,948	39.43	2,634	53.35
Dragan Mijatović Draganče	Socialist Party of Serbia–OO Rača	1,096	22.18	2,303	46.65
Radoslav Zdravković	Democratic Party of Serbia–Vojislav Koštunica	804	16.27		
Mileta Radovanović	Strength of Serbia Movement–Bogoljub Karić	460	9.31		
Verica Karić	Serbian Radical Party–Tomislav Nikolić	370	7.49		
Nebojša Pavlović	G17 Plus–Miroljub Labus	263	5.32		
Total		4,941	100.00	4,937	100.00

Results of the election for the Municipal Assembly of Rača:

Party	Votes	%	Seats
Serbian Renewal Movement–Democratic Party	1,899	38.44	13
Socialist Party of Serbia–Dragan Mijatović Draganče	788	15.95	5
Democratic Party of Serbia–Vojislav Koštunica	641	12.98	4
Strength of Serbia Movement–Bogoljub Karić	466	9.43	3
Serbian Radical Party–Tomislav Nikolić	405	8.20	3
G17 Plus–Miroljub Labus	275	5.57	2
New Serbia–Velja Ilić	199	4.03	1
Citizens' Group: Party for Undecided Voters–Budimir Milenković	141	2.85	–
Citizens' Group: Young Farmers–Slađan Milanović Karabaš	108	2.19	–
Citizens' Group: Milorad Petrović	18	0.36	–
Total	4,940	100.00	31
Valid votes	4,940	97.40	
Invalid/blank votes	132	2.60	
Total votes	5,072	100.00	
Registered voters/turnout	10,610	47.80	

===== Topola =====
2004 Municipality of Topola local election: Mayor of Topola (first round results)
Candidate	Party	Votes	%
Dragan Jovanović	New Serbia–Democratic Party of Serbia (Affiliation: New Serbia)	5,334	56.04
all other candidates (combined total)		4,185	43.96
Dušan Mladenović	Serbian Radical Party		
Total		9,519	100.00

Results of the election for the Municipal Assembly of Topola:

Party	Votes	%	Seats
Coalition: Democratic Party of Serbia and New Serbia	4,412	46.13	20
Democratic Party	1,445	15.11	6
Serbian Radical Party	885	9.25	4
Strength of Serbia Movement	691	7.23	3
Citizens' Groups (two different lists)	630	6.59	3
Socialist Party of Serbia	592	6.19	3
Serbian Renewal Movement	338	3.53	1
G17 Plus	311	3.25	1
Christian Democratic Party of Serbia	190	1.99	–
"Greens"	70	0.73	–
Total	9,564	100.00	41
Valid votes	9,564	97.23	
Invalid/blank votes	272	2.77	
Total votes	9,836	100.00	
Registered voters/turnout	19,800	49.68	

==== Zlatibor District ====
Local elections were held in nine of the ten municipalities of the Zlatibor District. The exception was Priboj, where the last election had taken place the previous year.

Incumbent mayor Miroslav Martić won the mayoral contest in the capital of Užice, while his Democratic Party won the assembly election and remained the dominant power in the local government. (Two years later, he was defeated in a recall election and a candidate of the Democratic Party of Serbia came to power.)

The Democratic Party also won the elections in Arilje and formed a coalition government in Bajina Bašta, notwithstanding that the Socialist Party of Serbia won the mayoral contest in the latter jurisdiction. The Socialists also won the elections in Nova Varoš, while the Democratic Party of Serbia won in Čajetina, and the Serbian Radical Party won in Požega. In Kosjerić, the Democratic Party of Serbia won the mayoral contest and formed a coalition government with the Serbian Renewal Movement and several other parties.

The Sandžak Democratic Party won the mayoral election in the predominantly Bosniak municipality of Sjenica and initially emerged as the dominant force in its coalition government. The party also won the mayoral contest in Prijepolje, due in part to a quirk in the voting process that saw two members of the municipality's minority Bosniak community advance to the second round. The coalition government that was ultimately formed in that municipality included the Sandžak Democratic Party and several parties representing the Serb community.

===== Užice =====
2004 Municipality of Užice local election: Mayor of Užice
Candidate	Party	First round		Second round	
Candidate	Party	Votes	%	Votes	%
Miroslav Martić (incumbent)	Democratic Party	4,874	23.82	7,041	51.81
Milovan Petrović	Socialist Party of Serbia	2,425	11.85	6,548	48.19
Nadežda Milivojević	Serbian Radical Party	2,011	9.83		
Đorđe Mijušković	Serbian Renewal Movement	1,879	9.18		
Dragan Nešović	League for Užice	1,299	6.35		
Danijela Đorđević	Strength of Serbia Movement	1,278	6.25		
Desimir Mićović	Democratic Party of Serbia	1,208	5.90		
Ivan Milutinović	Entrepreneurs' Group – Citizens	1,152	5.63		
Zoran Plećević	Civic Alliance of Serbia	1,116	5.45		
Ilija Misailović	Citizens' Group: Dr. Ilija Misailović	920	4.50		
Borko Tanović	Citizens' Group	870	4.25		
Dušan Novaković	G17 Plus	806	3.94		
Boris Karaičić	People's Democratic Party	624	3.05		
Total		20,462	100.00	13,589	100.00
Valid votes		20,462	97.64	13,589	98.35
Invalid/blank votes		494	2.36	228	1.65
Total votes		20,956	100.00	13,817	100.00
Registered voters/turnout		69,214	30.28	69,214	19.96

Miroslav Martić was defeated in a recall election in 2006. Tihomir Petković of the Democratic Party of Serbia won a by-election to determine a new mayor held later in the same year.

Results of the election for the Municipal Assembly of Užice:

Party	Votes	%	Seats
Democratic Party–Boris Tadić	4,375	21.47	16
Serbian Radical Party–Tomislav Nikolić	2,579	12.65	9
Democratic Party of Serbia–Dr. Vojislav Koštunica	2,037	9.99	7
Serbian Renewal Movement–Dr. Dragić Jezdić	1,823	8.94	7
Socialist Party of Serbia	1,710	8.39	6
League for Užice–Dr. Momo Arsenijević	1,490	7.31	6
Strength of Serbia Movement–Bogoljub Karić	1,424	6.99	5
G17 Plus–Miroljub Labus	1,088	5.34	4
Civic Alliance of Serbia–Zoran Plećević	982	4.82	4
Democratic Alternative–Social Democratic Party–Dr. Nebojša Čović	852	4.18	3
People's Democratic Party, Boris Karaičić	578	2.84	–
Citizens' Group: Dr. Ilija Misailović	403	1.98	–
New Serbia–Dragan Stojanović Ćumur	301	1.48	–
For My City–DHSS, LPS–Bogoljub Zečević	217	1.06	–
Citizens' Group: Petar Perišić	172	0.84	–
Citizens' Group: Selaković Nikola	135	0.66	–
Socialist People's Party–Sreten Simović	111	0.54	–
Citizens' Group: Dragan Tanasković	104	0.51	–
Total	20,381	100.00	67
Valid votes	20,381	97.27	
Invalid/blank votes	573	2.73	
Total votes	20,954	100.00	
Registered voters/turnout	69,214	30.27	

Former parliamentarian Bogoljub Zečević of the Christian Democratic Party of Serbia was the lead candidate on the For My City list.

The Democratic Party formed a coalition government after the election with the Democratic Party of Serbia, the Serbian Renewal Movement, the Civic Alliance of Serbia, the Social Democratic Party, and the Democratic Alternative. In November 2005, G17 Plus joined the coalition as well.

There was a change in government after Tihomir Petković won the mayoral by-election in 2006. The Serbian government eventually appointed a provisional administration govern the municipality with Petković.

===== Arilje =====
2004 Municipality of Arilje local election: Mayor of Arilje
Candidate	Party	First round		Second round	
Candidate	Party	Votes	%	Votes	%
Zoran Mićović (incumbent)	Democratic Party–Boris Tadić	3,381		2,891	54.34
Radojko Mladenović	Democratic Party of Serbia–Vojislav Koštunica	1,125		2,429	45.66
Milan Nikolić	Serbian Radical Party–Tomislav Nikolić				
other candidates					
Total				5,320	100.00

Results of the election for the Municipal Assembly of Arilje:

Party	Votes	%	Seats
Democratic Party–Boris Tadić	2,695	36.03	13
Serbian Radical Party–Tomislav Nikolić	1,101	14.72	5
Socialist Party of Serbia–Prof. Dr. Svetislav Petrović	809	10.82	4
Democratic Party of Serbia–Dr. Vojislav Koštunica Mr. Radojko Mladenović	756	10.11	4
Strength of Serbia Movement–Bogoljub Karić	705	9.43	4
Serbian Renewal Movement	506	6.76	3
Citizens' Groups (two different lists)	323	4.32	–
G17 Plus–Miroljub Labus	297	3.97	1
Party of Serbian Unity	139	1.86	–
New Serbia	114	1.52	–
Democratic Alternative	35	0.47	–
Total	7,480	100.00	34
Valid votes	7,480	96.19	
Invalid/blank votes	296	3.81	
Total votes	7,776	100.00	
Registered voters/turnout	15,967	48.70	

The Democratic Party formed a coalition government after the election with the Democratic Party of Serbia, G17 Plus, and the Serbian Renewal Movement.

===== Bajina Basta =====
2004 Bajina Bašta local election: Mayor of Bajina Bašta
Candidate	Party	First round		Second round	
Candidate	Party	Votes	%	Votes	%
Miloje Savić	Socialist Party of Serbia			4,789	51.38
Boban Tomić (incumbent)	Democratic Party			4,531	48.62
Zlatan Jovanović	Serbian Radical Party				
other candidates					
Total				9,320	100.00

Results of the election for the Municipal Assembly of Bajina Bašta:

Party	Votes	%	Seats
Democratic Party	2,596	26.69	13
Serbian Radical Party	1,788	18.38	9
Socialist Party of Serbia	1,766	18.15	9
Democratic Party of Serbia	1,019	10.47	5
Serbian Renewal Movement	654	6.72	3
Citizens' Groups (five different lists)	458	4.71	–
New Serbia	380	3.91	2
Strength of Serbia Movement	334	3.43	2
G17 Plus	332	3.41	2
Social Democratic Party	231	2.37	–
Socialist People's Party	170	1.75	–
Total	9,728	100.00	45
Valid votes	9,728	97.11	
Invalid/blank votes	290	2.89	
Total votes	10,018	100.00	
Registered voters/turnout	22,210	45.11	

Although Miloje Savić of the Socialist Party of Serbia won the mayoral contest, the Democratic Party was able to form a coalition government with the Democratic Party of Serbia, the Serbian Renewal Movement, and New Serbia.

===== Čajetina =====
2004 Municipality of Čajetina local election: Mayor of Čajetina
Candidate	Party	First round		Second round	
Candidate	Party	Votes	%	Votes	%
Milan Stamatović	Democratic Party of Serbia			3,797	58.54
information missing				2,689	41.46
Milka Rosić	Serbian Radical Party				
other candidates					
Total				6,486	100.00

Results of the election for the Municipal Assembly of Čajetina:

Party	Votes	%	Seats
Democratic Party of Serbia	2,121	32.24	10
Democratic Party	1,439	21.87	7
Strength of Serbia Movement	866	13.16	4
Socialist Party of Serbia	778	11.83	4
Serbian Renewal Movement	590	8.97	3
Serbian Radical Party	561	8.53	2
G17 Plus	224	3.40	1
Total	6,579	100.00	31
Valid votes	6,579	97.89	
Invalid/blank votes	142	2.11	
Total votes	6,721	100.00	
Registered voters/turnout	12,749	52.72	

The Democratic Party of Serbia formed a coalition government after the election with the Serbian Renewal Movement, the Strength of Serbia Movement, and G17 Plus.

===== Kosjerić =====
2004 Municipality of Kosjerić local election: Mayor of Kosjerić
Candidate	Party	First round		Second round	
Candidate	Party	Votes	%	Votes	%
Željko Prodanović	Democratic Party of Serbia–New Serbia (Affiliation: Democratic Party of Serbia)			3,303	63.95
Milovan Joksimović	Democratic Party			1,862	36.05
Momir Milovanović	Serbian Radical Party				
other candidates					
Total				5,165	100.00

Results of the election for the Municipal Assembly of Kosjerić:

Party	Votes	%	Seats
Democratic Party	1,139	20.38	6
Citizens' Groups (five different lists)	969	17.34	4
Serbian Renewal Movement	687	12.29	4
Democratic Party of Serbia	667	11.94	3
New Serbia	551	9.86	3
Socialist Party of Serbia	516	9.23	3
Serbian Radical Party	488	8.73	2
Strength of Serbia Movement	416	7.44	2
G17 Plus	155	2.77	–
Total	5,588	100.00	27
Valid votes	5,588	95.82	
Invalid/blank votes	244	4.18	
Total votes	5,832	100.00	
Registered voters/turnout	11,307	51.58	

The assembly election did not produce a clear winner, and a coalition government was later formed by the Serbian Renewal Movement, the Democratic Party of Serbia, New Serbia, the Socialist Party of Serbia, the Serbian Radical Party, and the "For Kosjerić" Citizens' Group.

===== Nova Varoš =====
2004 Municipality of Nova Varoš local election: Mayor of Nova Varoš
Candidate	Party	First round		Second round	
Candidate	Party	Votes	%	Votes	%
Branislav Dilparić	Socialist Party of Serbia	2,642	28.68	4,277	57.91
Milojko Šunjevarić	Democratic Party–Boris Tadić	1,478	16.05	3,108	42.09
all other candidates (combined total)		5,091	55.27		
Radivoje Bujišić Raco	Citizens' Group: New People for Nova Varoš				
Milenko Drobnjaković	New Serbia–Velimir Ilić				
Milan Knežević	Serbian Radical Party–Tomislav Nikolić				
Zoran Knežević	Citizens' Group: Movement for Nova Varoš				
Snežana Krdžavac Nedović	Strength of Serbia Movement				
Dragutin Kurćubić Dragan	Citizens' Group				
Dr. Branko Popović	Serbian Renewal Movement				
Zoran Tatović	Democratic Citizens' Group Nova Varoš				
Nenad Todorović	G17 Plus				
Zoran Vasojević	Citizens' Group: Nova Varoš Renewal Movement				
Miladin Zeković	Democratic Party of Serbia–Vojislav Koštunica				
Total		9,211	100.00	7,385	100.00
Source: All candidates except Dilparić and Šunjevarić are listed alphabetically.

Results of the election for the Municipal Assembly of Nova Varoš:

Party	Votes	%	Seats
Citizens' Groups (three different lists)	2,005	22.18	6
Socialist Party of Serbia Branislav Dilparić	1,742	19.27	5
Democratic Party–Boris Tadić	1,494	16.53	4
Serbian Radical Party–Tomislav Nikolić	920	10.18	3
Serbian Renewal Movement–Dr. Branko Popović	878	9.71	3
New Serbia–Velimir Ilić	558	6.17	2
Democratic Party of Serbia–Vojislav Koštunica	527	5.83	2
Strength of Serbia Movement–Bogoljub Karić	373	4.13	1
G17 Plus–Miroljub Labus	341	3.77	1
Sandžak Democratic Party	201	2.22	–
Total	9,039	100.00	27
Valid votes	9,039	98.09	
Invalid/blank votes	176	1.91	
Total votes	9,215	100.00	
Registered voters/turnout	15,801	58.32	

The Socialist Party of Serbia formed a coalition government after the election with the "New People for Nova Varoš" Citizens' Group, the Serbian Radical Party, the Democratic Party of Serbia, and the Strength of Serbia Movement.

===== Požega =====
2004 Municipality of Požega local election: Mayor of Požega (second round results)
Candidate	Party	Votes	%
Milan Stevović Bane	Serbian Radical Party	4,422	52.52
Nada Krstić	Democratic Party	3,997	47.48
Total		8,419	100.00

Results of the election for the Municipal Assembly of Požega:

Party	Votes	%	Seats
Serbian Radical Party	1,869	18.58	11
Citizens' Groups (fifteen different lists)	1,664	16.54	3
Democratic Party	1,395	13.87	8
Serbian Renewal Movement	1,216	12.09	7
Socialist Party of Serbia	1,168	11.61	7
Democratic Party of Serbia	1,099	10.92	6
Strength of Serbia Movement	805	8.00	5
G17 Plus	480	4.77	3
New Serbia	365	3.63	2
Total	10,061	100.00	52
Valid votes	10,061	96.95	
Invalid/blank votes	316	3.05	
Total votes	10,377	100.00	
Registered voters/turnout	26,181	39.64	

The Serbian Radical Party formed a coalition government after the election with the Socialist Party of Serbia, the Democratic Party of Serbia, the Strength of Serbia Movement, and G17 Plus.

===== Priboj =====
There were no local elections in Priboj in 2004. The previous elections took place in 2003 and the next elections apparently took place in 2008.

===== Prijepolje =====
2004 Municipality of Prijepolje local election: Mayor of Prijepolje
Candidate	Party	First round		Second round	
Candidate	Party	Votes	%	Votes	%
Mr. Nedžad Turković	Sandžak Democratic Party–Rasim Ljajić	3,148	19.68	7,396	70.72
Aziz Hadžifejzović	"List for Sandžak Dr. Sulejman Ugljanin" (Affiliation: Party of Democratic Action of Sandžak)	2,816	17.61	3,062	29.28
Branko Ćubić Ćuba	Serbian Radical Party–Tomislav Nikolić	2,634	16.47		
Vukosav Tomašević	Democratic Party of Serbia–Vojislav Koštunica	2,597	16.24		
Slobodan Gojković	Democratic Party–Boris Tadić	1,096	6.85		
Budimir Tešević Bude	Social Democracy	968	6.05		
Milan Gačević	New Serbia–Velimir Ilić	802	5.01		
Dragomir Malešić	Citizens' Group: For Prijepolje	557	3.48		
Dragan Ćosović	Socialist Party of Serbia	550	3.44		
Prof. Dr. Milan Martinović Mišo	Social Democratic Party	307	1.92		
Veka Radonjić	Strength of Serbia Movement–Bogoljub Karić	225	1.41		
Nebojša Žunić	Serbian Renewal Movement	185	1.16		
Slobodan Martinović	G17 Plus–Miroljub Labus	110	0.69		
Total		15,995	100.00	10,458	100.00
Valid votes		15,995	98.62	10,458	97.56
Invalid/blank votes		223	1.38	262	2.44
Total votes		16,218	100.00	10,720	100.00
Registered voters/turnout		33,894	47.85	33,895	31.63

Results of the election for the Municipal Assembly of Prijepolje:

Party	Votes	%	Seats
Sandžak Democratic Party–Rasim Ljajić	3,010	18.80	13
Serbian Radical Party–Tomislav Nikolić	2,765	17.27	11
"List for Sandžak Dr. Sulejman Ugljanin"	2,495	15.58	10
Democratic Party of Serbia–Vojislav Koštunica	1,586	9.91	7
Democratic Party–Boris Tadić	1,432	8.94	6
Socialist Party of Serbia	927	5.79	4
New Serbia–Velimir Ilić Velja	876	5.47	4
Social Democracy–Bude Tešević	783	4.89	3
Civic Alliance of Serbia–Goran Svilanović	656	4.10	3
Strength of Serbia Movement–Bogoljub Karić	471	2.94	–
Serbian Renewal Movement–Milisav Konatar Mića	292	1.82	–
Social Democratic Party	198	1.24	–
G17 Plus–Miroljub Labus	174	1.09	–
Citizens' Group: Agan Alomerović	124	0.77	–
Citizens' Group: List: From Under the Cockade	109	0.68	–
Citizens' Group: Pavle	71	0.44	–
Citizens' Group: Sulejman Đurđević	43	0.27	–
Total	16,012	100.00	61
Valid votes	16,012	97.92	
Invalid/blank votes	340	2.08	
Total votes	16,352	100.00	
Registered voters/turnout	33,894	48.24	

The Sandžak Democratic Party formed a coalition government after the election with the Democratic Party of Serbia, the Democratic Party, New Serbia, the Civic Alliance of Serbia, and Social Democracy. When the assembly convened on 9 November 2004, Dragan Svičević of the Democratic Party of Serbia was chosen as assembly president and Slobodan Gojković of the Democratic Party as assembly vice-president. Former mayor Radojko Petrić of the Socialist Party of Serbia, as the oldest delegate, presided over the assembly on an interim basis.

Gojković was elected to the assembly from the first position on the Democratic Party's list and Petrić from the second position on the Socialist Party's list.

===== Sjenica =====
2004 Municipality of Sjenica local election: Mayor of Sjenica
Candidate	Party	First round		Second round	
Candidate	Party	Votes	%	Votes	%
Esad Zornić	Sandžak Democratic Party–Rasim Ljajić	3,703		7,029	52.60
Ismet Mahmutović	"List for Sandžak Dr. Sulejman Ugljanin" (Affiliation: Party of Democratic Action of Sandžak)	4,250		6,333	47.40
Džemail Suljević	Sandžak People's Movement	2,831			
Stevica Tripković	Coalition: Serb Democratic Alliance (Christian Democratic Party of Serbia, Socialist Party of Serbia, New Serbia, Serbian Renewal Movement) (Affiliation: Socialist Party of Serbia)	1,625			
Goran Brajević	Serbian Radical Party				
other candidates					
Total				13,362	100.00

Esad Zornić won a recall election in 2006.

Results of the election for the Municipal Assembly of Sjenica:

Party	Votes	%	Seats
"List for Sandžak Dr. Sulejman Ugljanin"	4,307	33.50	14
Sandžak Democratic Party	3,496	27.20	11
Sandžak People's Movement	2,348	18.27	8
Coalition: Serb Democratic Alliance (Christian Democratic Party of Serbia, Socialist Party of Serbia, New Serbia, Serbian Renewal Movement)	703	5.47	2
Serbian Radical Party	703	5.47	2
Democratic Party of Serbia	535	4.16	2
Democratic Party	228	1.77	–
Social Democratic Party	186	1.45	–
G17 Plus	178	1.38	–
Strength of Serbia Movement	90	0.70	–
Party for Sandžak	46	0.36	–
Citizens' Group	35	0.27	–
Total	12,855	100.00	39
Valid votes	12,855	97.58	
Invalid/blank votes	319	2.42	
Total votes	13,174	100.00	
Registered voters/turnout	24,527	53.71	

The municipal administration was initially formed by the List for Sandžak and the Sandžak People's Movement; this alliance, however, fell apart within weeks. Subsequently, the Sandžak Democratic Party formed a coalition government after the election with the Sandžak People's Movement, the Socialist Party of Serbia, the Serbian Radical Party, and the Democratic Party of Serbia.

The municipal assembly was dissolved in early 2006 and a new assembly election was held on 10 September of that year. Zornić's standing as mayor was not affected.
