= List of minority political parties =

This is a list of political parties of minorities.

== Africa ==
Country	Party	Minority
Algeria	Berber Socialism and Revolution Party	Berbers
South Africa	Minority Front	Indian South Africans
South Africa	Inkatha Freedom Party	Zulu people
South Africa	Africa Muslim Party	South African Muslims
South Africa	Freedom Front Plus	Afrikaners

== Americas ==
Country	Party	Minority
Bolivia	Indigenous Pachakuti Movement	Indigenous peoples in Bolivia
Bolivia	Revolutionary Liberation Movement Tupaq Katari	Indigenous peoples in Bolivia
Chile	Wallmapuwen	Mapuche
Costa Rica	Costa Rican Renewal Party	Evangelical Christians
Costa Rica	National Restoration Party	Evangelical Christians
Costa Rica	New Republic Party	Evangelical Christians
Costa Rica	Accessibility without Exclusion	People with disabilities
Suriname	Pertjajah Luhur	Javanese people
Suriname	Party for National Unity and Solidarity	Javanese people
United States	African People's Socialist Party	African Americans
United States	All-African People's Revolutionary Party	African Americans
United States	Black Panther Party	African Americans
United States	Black Riders Liberation Party	African Americans
United States	Friends of Sinn Féin	Irish Americans
United States	Irish Republican Socialist Committees of North America	Irish Americans
United States	Raza Unida Party	Mexican Americans
United States	People's Constitutional Party	Mexican Americans
United States	American Indian Movement	Native Americans

== Asia ==
Country	Party	Minority
India	All India Minorities Front	
Iraq	Assyrian Democratic Movement	Assyrians in Iraq
Iraq	Chaldean Syriac Assyrian Popular Council	Assyrians in Iraq
Iraq	Sons of Mesopotamia	Assyrians in Iraq
Iraq	Assyria Liberation Party	Assyrians in Iraq
Iraq	Chaldean Democratic Union Party	Assyrians in Iraq
Iraq	Turkmen Development List	Iraqi Turkmen
Iraq	Erbil Turkmen	Iraqi Turkmen
Iraq	Turkmen Change and Renewal	Iraqi Turkmen
Iraq	Iraqi Turkmen Front	Iraqi Turkmen
Iraq	Kurdistan Democratic Party	Kurds in Iraq
Iraq	Gorran Movement	Kurds in Iraq
Iraq	Patriotic Union of Kurdistan	Kurds in Iraq
Iraq	Kurdistan Socialist Democratic Party	Kurds in Iraq
Iraq	Kurdistan Islamic Union	Kurds in Iraq
Iraq	Kurdistan Islamic Group	Kurds in Iraq
Israel	Balad	Arab-Israelis
Israel	United Arab List	Arab-Israelis
Israel	Ta'al	Arab-Israelis
Israel	Arab Democratic Party	Arab-Israelis
Israel	Democratic List for Israeli Arabs	Arab-Israelis
Israel	United Arab List (1976)	Arab-Israelis
Israel	Sephardim and Oriental Communities	Sephardi Jews and Mizrahi Jews
Israel	Shas	Sephardi Jews and Mizrahi Jews
Israel	Yemenite Association	Yemenite Jews
Israel	Tami	Mizrahi Jews
Israel	Yisrael Beiteinu	Russian Jews in Israel
Israel	Yisrael BaAliyah	Russian Jews in Israel
Malaysia	Malaysian Chinese Association	Malaysian Chinese
Malaysia	Liberal Democratic Party,	Malaysian Chinese
Malaysia	Malaysian Indian Congress	Malaysian Indians
Malaysia	Parti Gerakan Rakyat Malaysia|	Malaysian Chinese, Malaysian Indians and others
Malaysia	Parti Bersatu Sabah	Kadazan-Dusun, Murut people, Bajau people, and others
Malaysia	United Pasokmomogun Kadazandusun Murut Organisation	Kadazan-Dusun and Murut people
Lebanon	Syriac Union Party	Assyrians in Lebanon
Lebanon	Shuraya Party	Assyrians in Lebanon
Lebanon	Aramean Democratic Organization	Assyrians in Lebanon
Lebanon	Armenian Revolutionary Federation	Armenians in Lebanon
Lebanon	Social Democrat Hunchakian Party	Armenians in Lebanon
Lebanon	Ramgavar	Armenians in Lebanon
Lebanon	Free Lebanese Armenian Movement	Armenians in Lebanon
Lebanon	Kurdish Democratic Party	Kurds in Lebanon
Lebanon	Razkari Party	Kurds in Lebanon
Pakistan	Muttahida Qaumi Movement-Pakistan	Muhajir people
Singapore	Pertubuhan Kebangsaan Melayu Singapura	Malay Singaporeans
Sri Lanka	Tamil National Alliance	Sri Lankan Tamils
Sri Lanka	Illankai Tamil Arasu Kachchi	Sri Lankan Tamils
Sri Lanka	All Ceylon Tamil Congress	Sri Lankan Tamils
Sri Lanka	Tamil Eelam Liberation Organization	Sri Lankan Tamils
Sri Lanka	Tamil People's Council	Sri Lankan Tamils
Sri Lanka	Tamil United Liberation Front	Sri Lankan Tamils
Sri Lanka	Sri Lanka Muslim Congress	Muslims in Sri Lanka
Sri Lanka	All Ceylon Makkal Congress	Muslims in Sri Lanka
Sri Lanka	Ceylon Workers' Congress	Indian Tamils of Sri Lanka
Sri Lanka	Democratic People's Front	Indian Tamils of Sri Lanka
Sri Lanka	National Union of Workers	Indian Tamils of Sri Lanka
Sri Lanka	Up-Country People's Front	Indian Tamils of Sri Lanka
Taiwan	Hakka Party	Hakka people
Taiwan	Taiwan First Nations Party	Taiwanese indigenous peoples

== Europe ==
Country	Party	Minority
Albania	Macedonian Alliance for European Integration	Macedonians in Albania
Albania	Party of the Vlachs of Albania	Aromanians in Albania
Albania	Unity for Human Rights Party	Greeks in Albania
Austria	Enotna Lista	Carinthian Slovenes
Belgium	Démocrate, Fédéraliste, Indépendant	French Community of Belgium
Belgium	Pro Deutschsprachige Gemeinschaft	German-speaking Belgians
Bulgaria	Movement for Rights and Freedoms	Turks in Bulgaria
Bulgaria	Civil Union "Roma"	Roma people
Bulgaria	Euroroma	Roma people
Croatia	Democratic Union of Hungarians of Croatia	Hungarians of Croatia
Croatia	German People's Union - National Association of Danubian Schwaben in Croatia	Danube Swabians
Croatia	Party of Democratic Action of Croatia	Bosniaks of Croatia
Croatia	Independent Democratic Serb Party	Serbs of Croatia
Croatia	Party of Danube Serbs	Serbs of Croatia
Croatia	Serb People's Party (Croatia)	Serbs of Croatia
Denmark	Schleswig Party	North Schleswig Germans
Estonia	Constitution Party	Russians in Estonia
Estonia	Russian Party in Estonia	Russians in Estonia
Estonia	Estonian Centre Party	Russians in Estonia
Estonia	Estonian United Left Party	Russians in Estonia
Finland	Swedish People's Party of Finland	Swedish speakers
France	Parti Breton	Breton people
France	Union Démocratique Bretonne	Breton people
France	Emgann	Breton people
Germany	All-German Bloc/League of Expellees and Deprived of Rights	German refugees
Germany	Die Friesen	Frisians
Germany	South Schleswig Voters' Association	Danish people
Germany	Lusatian Alliance	Sorbs
Greece	Rainbow	Macedonians in Greek Macedonia
Greece	Party of Friendship, Equality and Peace	Turks of Western Thrace
Hungary	National Self-Government of Germans in Hungary	Germans of Hungary
Hungary	National Self-Government of Bulgarians	Bulgarians in Hungary
Italy	Slovenska Skupnost	Slovene minority in Italy
Italy	South Tyrolean People's Party	South Tyroleans
Italy	South Tyrolean Freedom	South Tyroleans
Italy	Die Freiheitlichen	South Tyroleans
Italy	Valdostan Union	French speakers
Latvia	Latvian Russian Union	Russians in Latvia and Latgalians
Latvia	Russian Party	Russians in Latvia and Latgalians
Latvia	For the Native Language!	Russians in Latvia and Latgalians
Lithuania	General Jewish Labour Bund	Lithuanian Jews
Lithuania	Folkspartei	Lithuanian Jews
Lithuania	Electoral Action of Poles in Lithuania	Poles in Lithuania
Lithuania	Lithuanian Russian Union	Russians in Lithuania
Lithuania	Alliance of Russians	Russians in Lithuania
Montenegro	Democratic Alliance in Montenegro	Albanians in Montenegro
Montenegro	Democratic Union of Albanians	Albanians in Montenegro
Montenegro	Albanian Alternative	Albanians in Montenegro
Montenegro	Bosniak Party	Bosniaks of Montenegro
Montenegro	Croatian Civic Initiative	Croats of Montenegro
Netherlands	Frisian National Party	Frisians
Netherlands	DeFriezen	Frisians
Netherlands	DENK	Turks and Moroccans in Netherlands
Netherlands	Islam Democrats	Muslims in the Netherlands
Netherlands	NIDA	Muslims in the Netherlands
North Macedonia	Democratic Party of Albanians	Albanians in North Macedonia
North Macedonia	Democratic Union for Integration	Albanians in North Macedonia
North Macedonia	Party for Democratic Prosperity	Albanians in North Macedonia
North Macedonia	Democratic Union of the Vlachs of Macedonia	Aromanians in North Macedonia
North Macedonia	Party of the Vlachs of Macedonia	Aromanians in North Macedonia
North Macedonia	Democratic League of Bosniaks	Bosniaks in North Macedonia
North Macedonia	Democratic Party of Serbs in Macedonia	Serbs in North Macedonia
North Macedonia	Democratic Party of Turks	Turks in North Macedonia
North Macedonia	Union of Roma in Macedonia	Roma people
Norway	Sámi People's Party	Sámi people
Poland	General Jewish Labour Bund	Polish Jews
Poland	Folkspartei	Polish Jews
Poland	German Minority (political party)	Germans in Poland
Romania	Democratic Alliance of Hungarians in Romania	Hungarians in Romania
Romania	Bratstvo Community of Bulgarians in Romania	Bulgarians in Romania
Romania	Bulgarian Union of Banat–Romania	Bulgarians in Romania
Romania	Association of Italians of Romania	Italians in Romania
Romania	Association of Macedonians of Romania	Macedonians of Romania
Romania	Cultural Union of Ruthenians of Romania	Rusyns of Romania
Romania	Community of the Lipovan Russians in Romania	Lipovans
Romania	Union of the Ukrainians of Romania	Ukrainians in Romania
Romania	Democratic Forum of Germans in Romania	Germans of Romania
Romania	Democratic Turkish Union of Romania	Turks of Romania
Romania	Democratic Union of Turkish-Muslim Tatars of Romania	Tatars of Romania
Romania	Democratic Union of Slovaks and Czechs of Romania	Slovaks of Romania and Czechs of Romania
Romania	Federation of the Jewish Communities in Romania	Jews of Romania
Romania	Hellenic Union of Romania	Greeks in Romania
Romania	League of Albanians of Romania	Albanians of Romania
Romania	Party of the Roma	Roma of Romania
Romania	Union of Armenians of Romania	Armenians of Romania
Romania	Union of Croatians of Romania	Croats of Romania
Romania	Union of Poles of Romania	Poles in Romania
Romania	Union of Serbs of Romania	Serbs of Romania
Serbia	Alliance of Vojvodina Hungarians	Hungarians in Serbia
Serbia	Democratic Fellowship of Vojvodina Hungarians	Hungarians in Serbia
Serbia	Democratic Party of Vojvodina Hungarians	Hungarians in Serbia
Serbia	Hungarian Civic Alliance	Hungarians in Serbia
Serbia	Hungarian Coalition	Hungarians in Serbia
Serbia	Hungarian Hope Movement	Hungarians in Serbia
Serbia	Hungarian Union	Hungarians in Serbia
Serbia	Bosniac Democratic Party of Sanjak	Bosniaks of Serbia
Serbia	Bosniak Democratic Union	Bosniaks of Serbia
Serbia	Party of Democratic Action of Sandžak	Bosniaks of Serbia
Serbia	Social Liberal Party of Sandžak	Bosniaks of Serbia
Serbia	Party of Democratic Action of Sandžak	Bosniaks of Serbia
Serbia	Justice and Reconciliation Party	Bosniaks of Serbia
Serbia	Roma Union of Serbia	Roma people
Serbia	Roma Party	Roma people
Serbia	Party for Democratic Action	Albanians in Serbia
Serbia	Albanian Coalition of Preševo Valley	Albanians in Serbia
Serbia	Democratic League of Croats in Vojvodina	Croats of Serbia
Serbia	Croatian Bunjevac-Šokac Party	Croats of Serbia
Serbia	Bunjevac-Šokac Party	Croats of Serbia
Serbia	Croatian National Alliance	Croats of Serbia
Serbia	Croatian Syrmian Initiative	Croats of Serbia
Serbia	Democratic Union of Croats	Croats of Serbia
Serbia	Democratic Party of Macedonians	Macedonians in Serbia
Serbia	Montenegrin Party	Montenegrins in Serbia
Serbia	Russian Party	Russians in Serbia
Serbia	Party of Russians of Serbia	Russians in Serbia
Serbia	Green Party	Slovaks in Serbia
Serbia	Slovaks Forward	Slovaks in Serbia
Serbia	Vlach National Party	Timok Vlachs
Slovakia	Most-Híd	Hungarians in Slovakia
Slovakia	Party of the Hungarian Coalition	Hungarians in Slovakia
Turkey	Peoples' Democratic Party	Kurds in Turkey
Turkey	Democratic Regions Party	Kurds in Turkey
Turkey	Freedom and Socialism Party	Kurds in Turkey
Turkey	Participatoric Democracy Party	Kurds in Turkey
Turkey	Rights and Freedoms Party	Kurds in Turkey
Ukraine	Qurultai-Rukh	Crimean Tatars
Ukraine	Party of Hungarians of Ukraine	Hungarians in Ukraine
Ukraine	Hungarian Democratic Party of Ukraine	Hungarians in Ukraine
United Kingdom	Scottish National Party	Scottish people
United Kingdom	Plaid Cymru	Welsh people
United Kingdom	Sinn Fein	Irish people
United Kingdom	Democratic Unionist Party	Northern Irish people (Anglo-Irish and Ulster Scots)
United Kingdom	Ulster Unionist Party	Northern Irish people (Anglo-Irish and Ulster Scots)
United Kingdom	Mebyon Kernow	Cornish people

== Oceania ==
Country	Party	Minority
Australia	Australia's First Nations Political Party	Aboriginal Australians
Australia	Australia's Indigenous Peoples Party	Aboriginal Australians
Australia	Indigenous-Aboriginal Party of Australia	Aboriginal Australians
New Caledonia	Union océanienne	Wallisians and Futunians
New Caledonia	Rassemblement démocratique océanien	Wallisians and Futunians
New Zealand	Māori Party	Māori

== See also ==
- Minority group
- Ethnic party
