= Stojan Tintor =

Serbian politician (born 1955)

Stojan Tintor (Serbian Cyrillic: Стојан Тинтор; born 29 June 1955) is a politician in Serbia. He served in the National Assembly of Serbia from 2004 to 2007 and the Assembly of Vojvodina from 2004 to 2016, and he was the mayor of Temerin from 2004 to 2008. He was a member of the far-right Serbian Radical Party during his political career, although in 2014 he provided support to the centre-left Democratic Party in a pivotal confidence vote in the Vojvodina assembly.

== Private career ==
Tintor graduated from the University of Novi Sad's Faculty of Electrical Engineering in 1979, with a focus on energy.

== Politician ==
=== Municipal politics ===
Tintor sought election to the Temerin municipal assembly in the 2000 Serbian local elections, running as the Radical candidate in the municipality's tenth division. He was defeated; the Radicals did not win any seats in the assembly in 2000. This was the last local electoral cycle in Serbia in which candidates were elected in constituency seats; all subsequent local elections have been held under a system of proportional representation.

Serbia introduced the direct election of mayors in the 2004 local elections. Tintor ran as the Radical Party's candidate in Temerin and was elected in the second round. He served in this role for the next four years. Serbia abandoned the direct election of mayors after the 2004 cycle; since then, mayors have been chosen by the elected members of city and municipal assemblies.

Tintor appeared in the lead position on the Radical Party's electoral list for Temerin in the 2008 Serbian local elections and took a mandate when the list won eleven seats in the local assembly. (For the 2008 local elections, all mandates were assigned to candidates on successful lists at the discretion of the sponsoring parties or coalitions. Tintor did not automatically receive a mandate by virtue of leading the list.) Although the Radicals won the greatest number of seats in the local assembly, they fell short of a majority, and Tintor did not continue as mayor. The Radicals experienced a serious split later in 2008, with several party members joining the more moderate Serbian Progressive Party under the leadership of Tomislav Nikolić and Aleksandar Vučić. Tintor remained with the Radicals.

Serbia's electoral system was reformed yet again in 2011, such that mandates in local, provincial, and parliamentary elections were awarded in numerical order to candidates on successful lists. Tintor again led the Radical list for Temerin in the 2012 Serbian local elections and was re-elected when the list won four seats. He was not a candidate for re-election in 2016.

=== Parliamentarian ===
Tintor appeared in the seventy-seventh position on the Radical Party's list in the 2003 Serbian parliamentary election. The list won eighty-two seats, and Tintor was chosen as a member of the party's delegation when the assembly met in January 2004. (From 2000 to 2011, mandates in Serbian parliamentary elections were awarded to sponsoring parties or coalitions rather than individual candidates, and it was common practice for the mandates to be assigned out of numerical order. Tintor's position on the list had no specific bearing on his chances of election.) Although the Radicals won more seats than any other party, they fell well short of a majority and ultimately served in opposition. Tintor served a full term in the assembly; he was a member of the committee for industry and the committee for science and technological development.

Tintor was included on the Radical Party's lists for the 2007 and 2008 parliamentary elections, although he was not awarded a mandate on either occasion. Following the 2011 electoral reform, Tintor appeared in the 121st position on the Radical Party's list in the 2012 Serbian parliamentary election and the 107th position in the 2014 election. The party did not cross the electoral threshold on either occasion.

=== Provincial politics ===
From 2004 to 2012, half of the mandates in the Vojvodina provincial assembly were determined by election in single-member constituencies, and the other half were determined by proportional representation. Tintor was elected to the provincial assembly for the Temerin constituency in the 2004 and 2008 provincial elections. In the 2012 provincial election, he appeared in the fourth position on the Radical Party's list and was re-elected when the list won five mandates. The Radicals served in opposition throughout this period.

In 2014, Tintor provided support to a new provincial administration led by Bojan Pajtić in a key vote of confidence. Some online sources suggest that he crossed the floor from the Radicals to the Democratic party at this time, although this does not appear to have happened. In any event, he was not a candidate for re-election in 2016.

== Electoral record ==
=== Provincial (Vojvodina) ===
2008 Vojvodina assembly election Temerin (constituency seat) - First and Second Rounds
Candidate	Party or Coalition	Votes	%	Votes	%
Stojan Tintor (incumbent)	Serbian Radical Party	4,344	27.68	4,896	50.15
Mihalj Matuška	Hungarian Coalition–István Pásztor	4,104	26.16	4,867	49.85
Marko Vulić	"For a European Vojvodina, Democratic Party–G17 Plus, Boris Tadić"	2,530	16.12		
Vesna Vajagić	Socialist Party of Serbia (SPS)–Party of United Pensioners of Serbia (PUPS)	1,496	9.53		
Slobodan Tomić	Democratic Party of Serbia, New Serbia	1,487	9.48		
Milomir Radić	Strength of Serbia Movement–Bogoljub Karić	1,055	6.72		
Nedeljko Ðukić	Citizens' Group: Good Neighbour–Nedeljko Ðukić	675	4.30		
Total valid votes		15,691	100	9,763	100
Invalid ballots		514		251	
Total votes casts		16,205	68.30	10,014	42.20

2004 Vojvodina assembly election Temerin (constituency seat) - First and Second Rounds
Candidate	Party or Coalition	Votes	%	Votes	%
Stojan Tintor	Serbian Radical Party–Tomislav Nikolić	4,001	38.13	6,511	56.49
Ferenc Dujmović	Alliance of Vojvodina Hungarians	1,978	18.85	5,015	43.51
Tibor Pal	Democratic Party of Vojvodina Hungarians	1,409	13.43		
Zoran Pekez	Socialist Party of Serbia	924	8.81		
Rodoljub Tica	Strength of Serbia Movement–Bogoljub Karić	853	8.13		
Nebojša Jović	Democratic Party of Serbia–Dr. Vojislav Koštunica	718	6.84		
Ferenc Slimak	Together for Vojvodina–Nenad Čanak	610	5.81		
Total valid votes		10,493	100	11,526	100
Invalid ballots		373		213	
Total votes casts		10,866	49.06	11,739	53.00

=== Municipal (Temerin) ===
2004 Temerin municipal election Mayor of Temerin - First and Second Round Results
Candidate	Party or Coalition	Votes	%	Votes	%
Stojan Tintor	Serbian Radical Party–Tomislav Nikolić	3,821	35.85	6,155	53.16
Tomislav Barna	Democratic Party–Boris Tadić	2,329	21.85	5,423	46.84
Gustonj Andraš	Democratic Party of Vojvodina Hungarians–Ágoston András	1,862	17.47		
Zoran Svitić	Socialist Party of Serbia–Zoran Svitić	926	8.69		
Ðuro Žiga (incumbent)	Democratic Party of Serbia–Dr. Vojislav Koštunica	643	6.03		
Vid Malešević	Strength of Serbia Movement	642	6.02		
Dragan Mićić	Coalition: G17 Plus Serbian Renewal Movement Christian Democratic Party of Serbia	231	2.17		
Siniša Milićević	Reformists of Vojvodina–Mile Isakov	205	1.92		
Total valid votes		10,659	100	11,578	100
Source: Službeni List (Opštine Temerin), Volume 37 Number 12 (26 October 2004), pp. 6-7.
