= Mihály Szecsei =

Serbian politician

Mihály Szecsei (Serbian: Михаљ Сечеи, Mihalj Sečei; 25 September 1929 – 17 February 2013) was a Serbian politician from the country's Hungarian community. He was a member of the Serbian national assembly from 1991 to 2001 and also served several terms in the Subotica local assembly and the Yugoslavian parliament's Chamber of Republics.

A member of the League of Communists of Vojvodina (SKV) while Serbia was a socialist state, Szecsei was a prominent local official in Subotica in the 1960s and 1970s. He joined the Democratic Fellowship of Vojvodina Hungarians (VMDK) after the restoration of political pluralism in 1990 and later became a leading figure in the breakaway Alliance of Vojvodina Hungarians (VMSZ).

== Early life and private career ==
Szecsei was born in the village of Adorjan, near Kanjiža, in what was then the Belgrade Oblast of the Kingdom of Serbs, Croats, and Slovenes. Eight days after his birth, the country's name was changed to the Kingdom of Yugoslavia, and Adorjan was incorporated into the newly formed Danube Banovina.

Szecsei attended high school in Senta. In 1949, four years after the establishment of the Federal People's Republic of Yugoslavia, he was sentenced to four years in prison for agitating against compulsory product delivery and agricultural collectivization, as well as for Hungarian national activities. More than two years of his sentence were spent at the notorious Goli Otok prison in Croatia.

Following his release, he studied in Skopje in what was then the People's Republic of Macedonia, earning an economics degree in 1956. He became head of planning for the People's District Committee in Subotica in 1960, and for two decades he worked at the Faculty of Economics at the University of Novi Sad (Subotica division). He also taught at the Faculty of Law in Novi Sad for four years and was deputy general manager for the Agros Agricultural Industrial Complex for a decade.

== Politician ==
=== League of Communists of Vojvodina ===
After the 1969 Serbian local elections, Szecesi was chosen as president of the Subotica local assembly's public service council (i.e., one of the assembly's three constituent bodies, along with the municipal council and the economic council). (Note: Szecsei was initially a candidate for the municipal council's thirty-second division, but he appears to have withdrawn his candidacy for that body prior to election day. It was reported the Antun Kopilović, the local leader of the Socialist Alliance of Working People (SSRN), strongly objected to his candidacy.) In 1971, he was one of a number of Hungarian officials in Subotica who supported the establishment of a local Hungarian language journal on science, art, and culture.

Szecsei also appears to have served on the economic council of the Vojvodina provincial assembly during the 1969–74 term, possibly after winning a by-election. In January 1973, he spoke to the council about declining sales of tractors relative to cars in several agricultural villages, citing this as evidence of a sector-wide decline in farming.

=== Democratic Fellowship of Vojvodina Hungarians ===
==== First parliamentary term ====
Serbia transitioned from a one-party socialist state to a (nominally) multi-party democracy in 1990; in practice, the country's political life for the next decade was dominated by the authoritarian rule of Slobodan Milošević, leader of the Socialist Party of Serbia (SPS). Szecsei joined the VMDK, which was then the dominant party in Serbia's Hungarian community.

Szecsei was first elected to the Serbian national assembly in the 1990 Serbian parliamentary election, winning Subotica's third constituency seat by a significant margin in the first round of voting with a combined endorsement from the VMDK, the Union of Reform Forces of Yugoslavia in Vojvodina (SRSJ-V), the Democratic Alliance of Croats in Vojvodina (DSHV), and the People's Peasant Party (NSS). The Socialists won a landslide majority overall, and the VMDK, with eight seats, served in opposition.

The Socialist Federal Republic of Yugoslavia (SFRY) officially ceased to exist in April 1992, and the Federal Republic of Yugoslavia (FRY) came into being as a successor state of sorts, comprising the republics of Serbia and Montenegro. The new federation had a bicameral assembly, and its upper house, known as the Chamber of Republics, was composed of twenty representatives each from the Serbian and Montenegrin parliaments. On 27 May 1992, Szecsei was chosen as a member of the Serbian parliament's inaugural delegation. He supported Yugoslavian prime minister Milan Panić's economic and social program in a November 1992 debate, while noting that the chamber had scarcely taken note of it. (Panić was at this time a rival to Milošević.)

Szecsei was also elected to the Subotica local assembly, which was by this time unicameral, in the May 1992 Serbian local elections. The VMDK and DSHV formed government in the city, and he supported the local administration.

In 1992, Szecsei served on an all-party committee of Serbian parliamentarians which was commissioned to draft a resolution on the government's measures and Serbia's strategy in response to international sanctions against Yugoslavia.

==== Second and third parliamentary terms ====
Serbia adopted a system of proportional representation at the republican level prior to the 1992 parliamentary election. Under this system, one-third of mandates were assigned to candidates on successful electoral lists in numerical order, while the remaining two-thirds were distributed to other candidates at the discretion of the sponsoring parties or coalitions. Szecsei appeared in the third position on the VMDK's list for the Zrenjanin division and was automatically elected (due to rounding) when the list won seven seats. The Socialists won a plurality victory overall with 101 out of 250 seats and initially governed with informal support from the far-right Serbian Radical Party (SRS). The VMDK, with nine members, continued to serve in opposition.

Szecsei was also re-elected to the Subotica assembly in the December 1992 Serbian local elections, which took place concurrently with the parliamentary vote. The VMDK and DSHV won an increased victory in the city, and he continued to support the local government.

In the national assembly, Szecsei served on the committee for development and economic relations with foreign countries and the committee for agriculture, food industry, energy, water management, and rural development. He was not included in the Serbian parliament's new delegation to the Yugoslavian Chamber of Republics elected on 28 January 1993.

The Socialist–Radical alliance broke down later in 1993, and a new Serbian parliamentary election was held in December of that year. This time, Szecsei received the fourth position on the VMDK's list for Zrenjanin. The list won five seats, and although he was not automatically re-elected he received a new mandate all the same. The Socialists won an increased plurality victory overall with 123 seats and afterward gained a parliamentary majority though an alliance with the small New Democracy (ND) party. The VMDK did not win any seats other than their five mandates in the Zrenjanin division. Szecsei was not given any committee assignments when the new parliament convened, although he was chosen in February 1994 for another term in Serbia's delegation to the Yugoslavian Chamber of Republics.

=== Alliance of Vojvodina Hungarians ===
The VMDK experienced a serious split in 1994, with several of its leading members forming the breakaway Alliance of Vojvodina Hungarians (VMSZ). Szecsei was a founding member of the new party and was chosen as one of its vice-presidents at its inaugural meeting in June 1994. The VMSZ soon replaced the VMDK as the main party of Vojvodina Hungarians; in Subotica, the sitting VMDK mayor József Kasza joined the VMSZ, which afterward became the dominant force in the local government.

The VMSZ won a reduced victory in Subotica in the 1996 local elections. Although the Socialist Party lost control over several major Serbian cities in this cycle, it actually increased its standing in Subotica, and Szecsei was personally defeated by a Socialist candidate in his bid for re-election to the local assembly. With no party or alliance holding a viable majority, the VMSZ ultimately formed a grand coalition administration with the Socialists and the Alliance of Citizens of Subotica (SGS).

Szecsei led the VMSZ's list for the smaller, redistributed Zrenjanin division in the 1997 Serbian parliamentary election and was automatically re-elected when the list won a single mandate. He was the oldest member of the parliament elected in 1997 and, accordingly, had the right to preside over the assembly in a "father of the house" role pending the election of a new speaker. He was unable to attend the constitutive session due to an injury sustained in a recent traffic accident, however, and the second-oldest member, Jovan Krkobabić of the Socialists, fulfilled the responsibility instead.

The Socialist Party and its allies, the Yugoslav Left (JUL) and New Democracy, fell to 110 seats out of 250 in the 1997 parliamentary election. Szecsei represented the VMSZ in talks on the formation of a new government and indicated that the party was willing to support a "national unity" administration. In February 1998, while these negotiations were still in progress, he was elected to another term in the Yugoslavian Chamber of Republics. Ultimately, the SPS and JUL formed a coalition government with the Radicals, and the VMSZ remained in opposition.

In early 2000, the VMSZ joined the Democratic Opposition of Serbia (DOS), a broad and ideologically diverse coalition of parties opposed to Slobodan Milošević's continued rule. Szecsei's term in the Chamber of Republics came to an end in May 2000, when the Serbian parliament elected a new delegation composed exclusively of SPS, JUL, and SRS representatives.

DOS candidate Vojislav Koštunica defeated Milošević in the 2000 Yugoslavian presidential election, and Milošević fell from power on 5 October 2000, a watershed moment in Serbian and Yugoslavian politics. The DOS also won several major victories in the 2000 Serbian local elections, which occurred concurrently with the Yugoslavian vote. In Subotica, the DOS won fifty-nine out of sixty-seven seats. Szecsei was re-elected to the local assembly and once again supported the administration, which continued to be dominated by the VMSZ.

Szecsei was not a candidate in the 2000 Serbian parliamentary election, and his parliamentary tenure ended when the new assembly convened in January 2001. He served in the Subotica local assembly until 2004, at which time he retired from politics.

== Death ==
Szecsei died on 17 February 2013 at the age of eighty-three, following a long and serious illness.

== Electoral record ==
=== National Assembly of Serbia ===
1990 Serbian parliamentary election: Subotica III
Candidate	Party	Votes	%
Mihály Szecsei	Democratic Fellowship of Vojvodina Hungarians–Union of Reform Forces of Yugoslavia in Vojvodina– Democratic Alliance of Croats in Vojvodina–People's Peasant Party (Affiliation: Democratic Fellowship of Vojvodina Hungarians)	11,991	61.95
József Agárdi	Socialist Party of Serbia	3,655	18.88
Đorđe Škrbić	Serbian Renewal Movement	1,498	7.74
Stanislav Žitnik	Party of Yugoslavs	1,340	6.92
Jovo Jovetić	Citizens' Group	871	4.50
Total		19,355	100.00
Valid votes		19,355	92.78
Invalid/blank votes		1,507	7.22
Total votes		20,862	100.00

=== Local (Subotica) ===
2000 Subotica city election: Division 34 (Kertvaroš I)
Candidate	Party	Votes	%
Mihály Szecsei	Democratic Opposition of Serbia (Affiliation: Alliance of Vojvodina Hungarians)		elected
Vera Adžić	Serbian Radical Party		
László Bartus	Citizens' Group		
Vojin Kalinić	Socialist Party of Serbia–Yugoslav Left		
Klara Kodžoman Pejić	Alliance of Citizens of Subotica–Reformists of Vojvodina (Affiliation: Alliance of Citizens of Subotica)		
Mária Silák	Democratic Party of Vojvodina Hungarians		
Total			
Source: All candidates except Szecsei are listed alphabetically.

1996 Subotica city election: Division 34 (Kertvaroš I)
Candidate	Party	First round		Second round	
Candidate	Party	Votes	%	Votes	%
Dragan Vukdelija	Socialist Party of Serbia		17.22		elected in the second round
Mihály Szecsei (incumbent for Division 48)	Alliance of Vojvodina Hungarians		34.21		defeated in the second round
Stojimir Andonović Stole	Serbian Radical Party				
Mgr. Mirjana Dokmanović	Citizens' Group				
Dušanka Ivančević	Citizens' Group				
Dr. Lászlo Laki	Yugoslav Left				
Dr. Sava Lutkić	Federal Party of Yugoslavs–JUL				
Mária Silák	Democratic Fellowship of Vojvodina Hungarians				
Total					
Source: All candidates except Vukdelija and Szecsei are listed alphabetically.

December 1992 Subotica city election: Division 48 (Bačseleš)
Candidate	Party	Votes	%
Mihály Szecsei (incumbent)	Democratic Fellowship of Vojvodina Hungarians		elected in the first round
Ferenc Pap	Coalition for Subotica (Reformist Democratic Party of Vojvodina– Democratic Party–Civic Movement for Subotica – Doves of Subotica– League of Social Democrats of Vojvodina–Democratic Movement of Serbia) (Affiliation: Reformist Democratic Party of Vojvodina)		defeated
Total			

May 1992 Subotica city election: Division 48 (Bačseleš)
Candidate	Party	Votes	%
Mihály Szecsei	Democratic Fellowship of Vojvodina Hungarians		elected in the first round
Gábor Hompoth	Civic Movement for Subotica – Doves of Subotica		defeated
Total			
