= Sándor Páll =

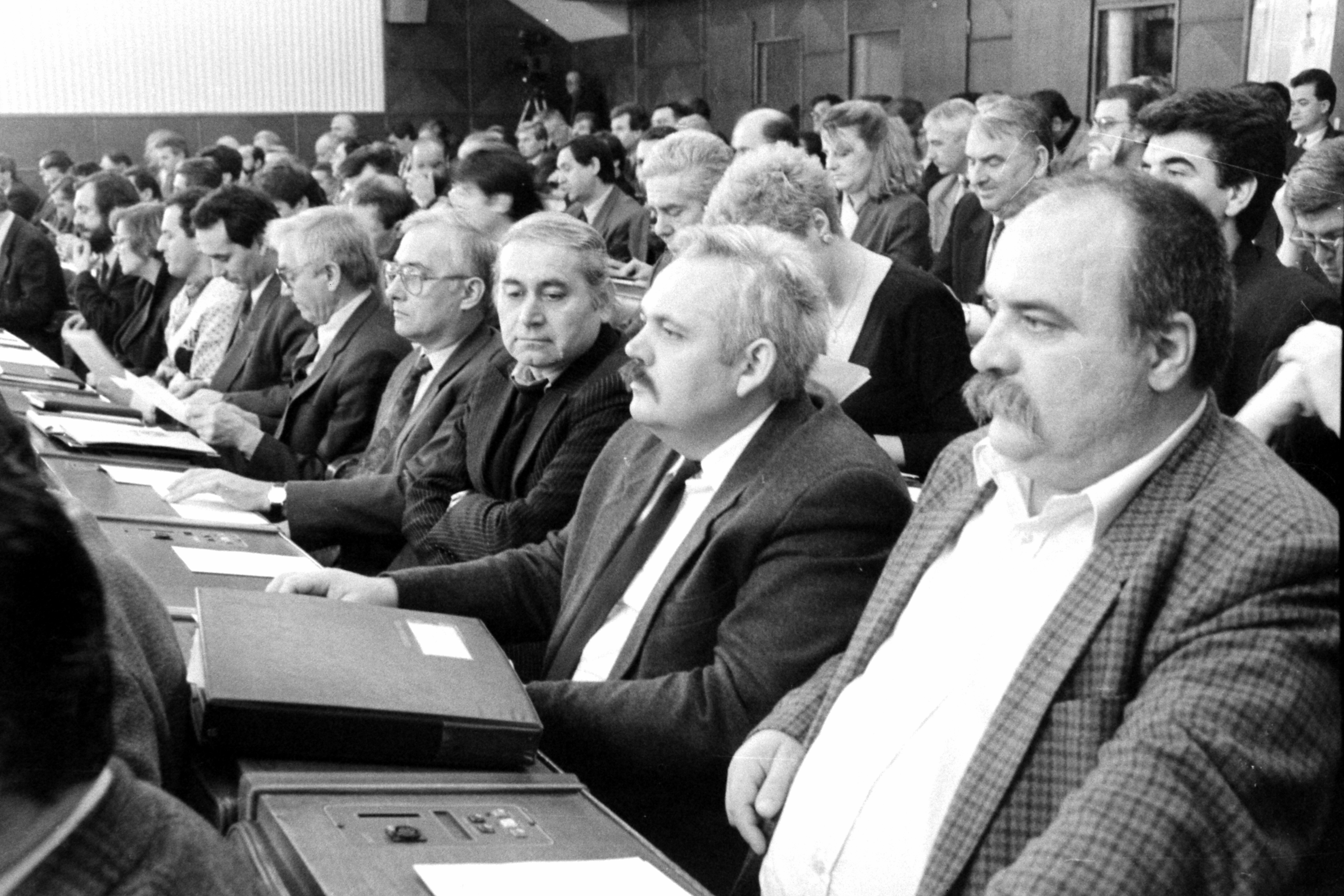

Sándor Páll (Serbian: Шандор Пал, Šandor Pal) (15 February 1954, Bačko Petrovo Selo – 7 July 2010, Novi Sad) was an ethnic Hungarian politician in Serbia and leader of Democratic Fellowship of Vojvodina Hungarians.

Born in Bačko Petrovo Selo in Serbia to Hungarian father and Serbian mother, he graduated in 1977 as a teacher of Yugoslav literature at the University of Novi Sad and got his MB in 1988. Formerly a schoolteacher, he was afterwards a professor at the University of Novi Sad. He died in Novi Sad, Serbia on 7 July 2010 at the age of 56.

Along with András Ágoston, he was one of the leaders of the coalition "Hungarian Union" which contested the 2007 Serbian parliamentary election, but won no seats. He later became (and remained till his death) a member of the "Hungarian Coalition", together with István Pásztor's Alliance of Vojvodina Hungarians and Ágoston's Democratic Party of Vojvodina Hungarians, created for the purpose of the 2008 Serbian parliamentary election.
