= 2008 Serbian parliamentary election =

← 2007	11 May 2008	2012 →
- All 250 seats in the National Assembly; 126 seats needed for a majority
- Turnout: 61.33% (▲0.72pp)
Party	Leader	Vote %	Seats	+/–
ZES	Boris Tadić	39.25	102	+15
SRS	Tomislav Nikolić	30.10	78	−3
DSS–NS	Vojislav Koštunica	11.87	30	−13
SPS–PUPS–JS	Ivica Dačić	7.75	20	+4
LDP–DHSS–SDU	Čedomir Jovanović	5.35	13	+2
Minority lists
MK	István Pásztor	1.85	4	+1
LZS	Sulejman Ugljanin	0.94	2	0
KSLP	Riza Halimi	0.41	1	0
This lists parties that won seats. See the complete results below.
Results by municipalities
ZES SRS DSS–NS MK LZS KSLP
Prime Minister before	Prime Minister after
Vojislav Koštunica; DSS	Mirko Cvetković; Independent

Parliamentary elections were held in Serbia on 11 May 2008 to elect members of the National Assembly. The election was held barely a year after the previous parliamentary election. There were 6,749,886 eligible electors who were able to vote in 8,682 voting places, as well as 157 special voting stations for refugees from Kosovo.

== Background ==
The Government of Serbia had passed through weeks of severe crisis after the unilateral declaration of independence of its southern province of Kosovo on 17 February 2008. Its stability, however, was also tested and questioned before, being comprised by two very different political currents. Kosovo's independence was gradually recognized by the United States and numerous European Union countries, leading to strain in their relations with Serbia. Prime Minister Vojislav Koštunica of the Democratic Party of Serbia (DSS) offered in late February to the Democratic Party (Serbia) (DS), which holds governmental majority, a restructuring of the governmental contract including an annex according to which Serbia can continue European exclusively with Kosovo as its integral part. The controversy was further heated up when Olli Rehn, the European Commissioner for enlargement of the European Union, offered to continue negotiations with Serbia. President Boris Tadić of the DS responded that European integrations of Serbia cannot be questioned by anyone or anything, and that since the province of Kosovo-Metohija is written into the constitution, meaning that the proposal would mean that the Constitution is being questioned.

After days of DS and G17+ utilising their majority to outnumber the DSS-New Serbia (NS) populist coalition, the Premier finally stated on 8 March 2008 in a press conference that the government had fallen. He scheduled an irregular session of the Serbian government for 10 March 2008, in which his proposal to issue a request to the President to dismiss the parliament and schedule pre-term parliamentary elections for 11 May 2008, the same as the local elections. In the event that this did not occur, he would announce his imminent resignation. Subsequently, all parliamentary leaders, save for Ivica Dačić of the Socialist Party of Serbia who called for forming a government of national unity and Dragan Marković Palma of United Serbia, supported his proposal. Hours later, the President confirmed he would dismiss the parliament and schedule the election upon receiving the government's request, although unlike the PM he stated that there is no dispute in the government regarding Kosovo, but exclusively regarding European integration. The dissolution took place on 13 March 2008.

A revote was held in three polling stations (in Kraljevo, Žagubica and Srbica) on 18 May 2008 due to irregularities in the electoral process.

== Electoral lists ==
A list of registered electoral lists:

#	Ballot name	Ballot carrier	Main ideology	Political position	Note
1	For a European Serbia – Boris Tadić; DS, G17+, SDP, LSV, SPO, DSHV	Dragoljub Mićunović	Social liberalism	Centre to centre-left	
2	Liberal Democratic Party – Čedomir Jovanović; LDP, SDU, DHSS	Čedomir Jovanović	Liberalism	Centre	
3	Democratic Party of Serbia – New Serbia – Vojislav Koštunica; DSS, NS	Vojislav Koštunica	National conservatism	Right-wing	
4	Serbian Radical Party – Dr Vojislav Šešelj; SRS	Vojislav Šešelj	Ultranationalism	Far-right	
5	Socialist Party of Serbia – Party of United Pensioners of Serbia – United Serbia; SPS, PUPS, JS	Ivica Dačić	Populism	Big tent	
6	Bosniak List for European Sandžak – dr Sulejman Ugljanin; SDAS, SLPS, BDSS, RS	Sulejman Ugljanin	Minority politics	Centre to centre-right	^{M}
7	Hungarian Coalition – István Pásztor; VMSZ/SVM, VMDK/DZVM, VMDP/DSVM	István Pásztor	Minority politics	Centre-right	^{M}
8	Reformist Party – dr Aleksandar Višnjić; RS	Snežana Miljković	Reformism	Centre	
9	The Village is Asked – People's Peasant Party – Marijan Rističević; NSS	Radiša Pavlović	Agrarianism	Right-wing	
10	Strength of Serbia Movement – Bogoljub Karić; PSS	Dragomir Karić	Conservatism	Centre-right	
11	Civic Initiative of Gora – GIG; GIG	Orhan Dragaš	Minority politics		^{M}
12	United Vlachs of Serbia – Predrag Balašević; VNS, VDSB, VDSN, VDSK	Predrag Balašević	Minority politics	Centre	^{M}
13	Vojvodina Party – mr Igor Kurjački; VP	Zoran Trifunac	Vojvodina autonomism	Left-wing	
14	Romas for Roma – Miloš Paunković; RZR	Miloš Paunković	Minority politics		^{M}
15	Montenegrin Party – Nenad Stevović; CP	Nenad Stevović	Minority politics		^{M}
16	Roma Union of Serbia – dr Rajko Đurić; URS	Rajko Đurić	Minority politics		^{M}
17	Albanian Coalition of Preševo Valley; PVD/PDD	Riza Halimi	Minority politics	Centre-right	^{M}
18	Alliance of Bunjevci of Bačka – Mirko Bajić; SBB	Mirko Bajić	Minority politics		^{M}
19	My Serbia Movement – Branislav Lečić; MS	Branislav Lečić	Liberalism	Centre	
20	People's Movement for Serbia – Milan Paroški; NPS	Milan Paroški	Serbian nationalism	Right-wing	
21	Patriotic Party of the Diaspora – Zoran Milinković; PSD	Branko Opačić	Diaspora politics		
22	Roma Party – Srđan Šajn; RP	Srđan Šajn	Minority politics		^{M}

^{M} — national minority list

== Campaign ==
The parties' campaign slogans for the 2008 election:

Party	English slogan	Serbian slogan
For a European Serbia	For a European Serbia	Za evropsku Srbiju
Liberal Democratic Party	Spread further! Serbia without borders	Širi dalje! Srbija bez granica
DSS-NS	Support Serbia!	Podrži Srbiju!
Serbian Radical Party	Go Serbia!	Napred Srbijo!
SPS-PUPS-JS	Stand up Serbia	Ustani Srbijo
Strength of Serbia Movement	Not giving Serbia up	Ne dam Srbiju

== Party lists ==
=== For a European Serbia coalition ===
1. For a European Serbia - Boris Tadić

President Boris Tadić has gathered a large pro-EU coalition around his DS and G17 Plus. On the list 166 candidates are from DS, 60 from G17+ and 8 members from each of the following parties Sanjak Democratic Party and League of Social Democrats of Vojvodina. 25 seats are guaranteed for G17+, 4 seats and a Ministry in the future government for both SDP and SPO and 3 seats for LSV. However, if the alliance wins over 100 seats, their seats will gradually increase. The list's name is For a European Serbia – Boris Tadić and its leader is Dragoljub Mićunović.

The List won 102 seats, of which 25 went to G17+.

=== DSS-NS coalition ===
The populist coalition of incumbent Prime Minister Koštunica's Democratic Party of Serbia (DSS) and their coalition partner New Serbia (NS) ran together in the election. 70% of the seats went to DSS and 30% to NS. Its campaign slogan was Support Serbia!. Koštunica was its candidate for Prime Minister.

The Populists won 30 seats, 21 of which went to DSS and 9 to NS.

=== Serbian Radical Party ===
The Serbian Radical Party ran alone in this parliamentary election. The party presented its list of 250 candidates.

=== SPS-PUPS-JS coalition ===
5. Rise up Serbia!

The Socialist Party of Serbia and the Party of United Pensioners of Serbia have strengthened their links by forming a coalition, on which United Serbia and Movement of Veterans of Serbia will be present. 151 candidates are from SPS (with 1 from PVS), 69 from PUPS and 30 from JS. The Socialists' presidential candidate Milutin Mrkonjić was nominated for Prime Minister.

=== Liberal Democrats ===
Liberal Democratic Party, Social Democratic Union and the Christian Democratic Party of Serbia formed pre-electoral coalition. Čedomir Jovanović was its candidate for Prime Minister.

=== Minorities ===
The Party for Democratic Action is determined to go on the election and gather the ethnic Albanian minority parties from the Preševo Valley. The Hungarian Coalition of Alliance of Vojvodina Hungarians, Democratic Fellowship of Vojvodina Hungarians and Democratic Party of Vojvodina Hungarians ran together after the presidential elections success in an attempt to strengthen the Magyar minority's representation. The Civic Initiative of Gora ran for the first time representing the Goranis in the Serbian parliament for the very first time. The Bosniak Democratic Party of Sandžak gathered a Bosniac List – For a European Sanjak – Sulejman Ugljanin (Бошњачка листа – За европски Санџак – Сулејман Угљанин) coalition.

On proposal of SRS the electoral boards has changed the electoral rules for the minority parties, which now need the standard 10,000 signatures instead of privileged 3,000. This has caused an outbreak of public protest amongst Roma and Albanian minorities, who consider this a scandalous removal of positive discrimination of the national minorities, as it opens the question whether they could accumulate that many signatures in time.

== Opinion polls ==
Party	Medium Gallup, March 2008	Strategic Marketing, March 2008	CeSID, May 2008	Medium Gallup, May 2008
SRS	91	90	86	90
ZES	88	83	81	85
DSS-NS	30	30	35	30
SPS	16	17	19	19
LDP	15	20	19	16
minorities	10	10	10	10
total	250	250	250	250

- Election References:

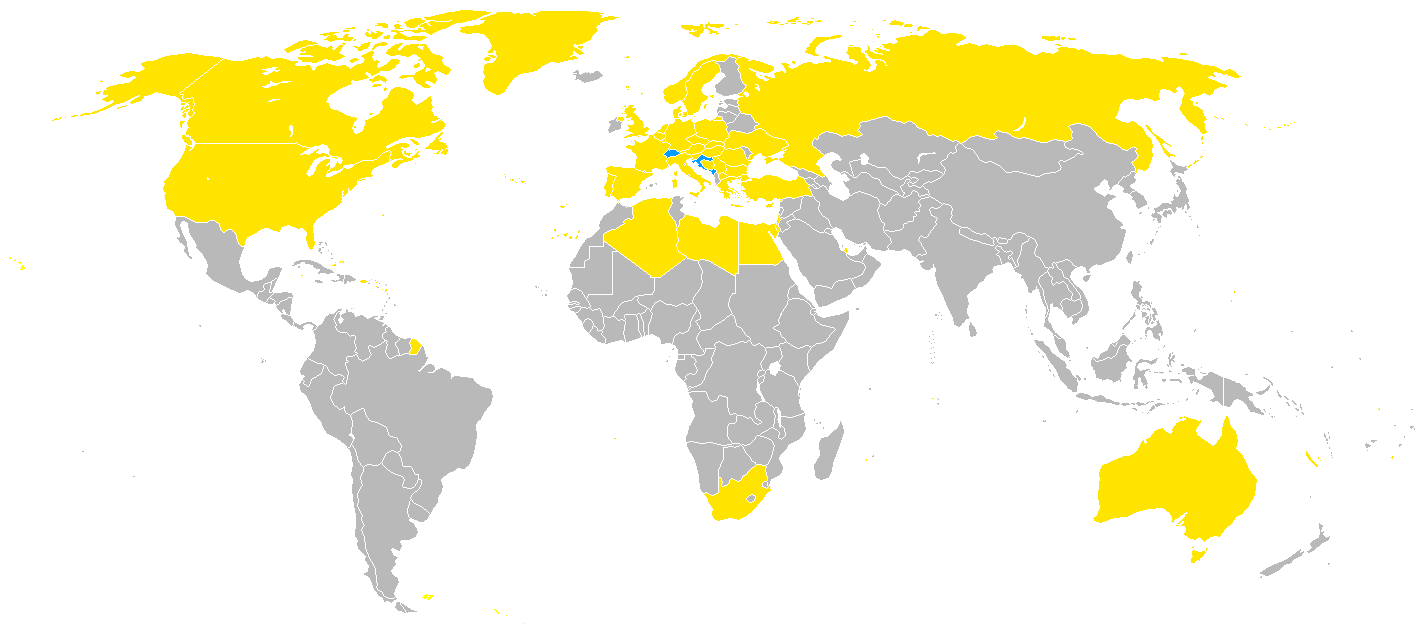
Diaspora voting results

== Results ==
Party	Votes	%	Seats	+/–
For a European Serbia (Note: List included Democratic Party (64 seats), G17 Plus (24), League of Social Democrats of Vojvodina (5), the Social Democratic Party of Serbia (4), the Serbian Renewal Movement (4) and the Democratic Alliance of Croats in Vojvodina (1))	1,590,200	39.25	102	+15
Serbian Radical Party	1,219,436	30.10	78	–3
Democratic Party of Serbia − New Serbia (Note: The Democratic Party of Serbia won 21 seats and New Serbia 9)	480,987	11.87	30	–13
SPS coalition (Note: The Socialist Party of Serbia won 12 seats, the Party of United Pensioners of Serbia 5 and United Serbia (3))	313,896	7.75	20	+2
Liberal Democratic Party coalition (Note: List included Liberal Democratic Party (11 seats), the Christian Democratic Party of Serbia (1) and the Social Democratic Union (1))	216,902	5.35	13	+2
Hungarian Coalition (Note: The Alliance of Vojvodina Hungarians won all four seats)	74,874	1.85	4	+1
Bosniak List for a European Sandžak (Note: The Party of Democratic Action of Sandžak and Bosniak Democratic Party of Sandžak won one seat each)	38,148	0.94	2	0
Strength of Serbia Movement	22,250	0.55	0	0
Albanian Coalition of Preševo Valley	16,801	0.41	1	0
People's Peasant Party	12,001	0.30	0	0
Reformist Party	10,563	0.26	0	0
Roma Party	9,103	0.22	0	–1
My Serbia Movement	8,879	0.22	0	New
United Vlachs of Serbia	6,956	0.17	0	New
Civic Initiative of Gora	5,453	0.13	0	New
Romas for Roma	5,115	0.13	0	New
Roma Union of Serbia	4,732	0.12	0	–1
Vojvodina's Party	4,208	0.10	0	0
People's Movement for Serbia	3,795	0.09	0	New
Montenegrin Party	2,923	0.07	0	New
Alliance of Bačka Bunjevci	2,023	0.05	0	New
Patriotic Party of the Diaspora	1,991	0.05	0	New
Total	4,051,236	100.00	250	0
Valid votes	4,051,236	97.87		
Invalid/blank votes	88,148	2.13		
Total votes	4,139,384	100.00		
Registered voters/turnout	6,749,688	61.33		
Source: Republican Electoral Commission

== Government formation ==
SRS has declared post-electoral cooperation forming a government with DSS, which in turn didn't disregard this possibility, but stated that there will be no more cooperation with DS or G17+, on the allegation that they do not really want to protect Kosovo. NS excluded cooperation with G17+ and LSV, calling them "anti-state" parties who "had brought down the government twice", but also did not rule out a coalition with the SRS, and furthermore claimed that the DS had talked with the DSS about throwing G17+ out of the government and having it supported by the SPS. SPS-PUPS-JS confirmed its determined to form a post-electoral coalition with SRS and DSS-NS and excluded the possibility of any cooperation with the Europeists because of G17+ and LSV, but its leaders have continually left an option of open dialog with the DS.

The European Coalition excluded all cooperation with SRS and stated that all other coalitions are in option, as long as they accept the pro-EU cause and the five principles of the former government. Regarding coalition with DSS, Koštunica can no longer count on the PM seat. LDP however, excluded the possibility to take part in any government with DSS, SPS or NS under any circumstance.

According to a post-electoral poll conducted by Strategic Marketing from 22 to 24 May 2008, 51% of the citizens support a pro-European Coalition with the Socialists and minority support (ZES, SPS-PUPS-JS & minorities), 45% a Patriotic government (SRS, DSS-NS & SPS-PUPS-JS) and 6% are undecided. On the question regarding the possibility of repeated elections:

- ZES - 111
- SRS - 75
- DSS-NS - 28
- SPS-PUPS-JS - 16
- LDP - 13
- minorities - 7

After long and difficult negotiations, the new pro-European government was formed on 7 July 2008 by 128 out of 250 parliamentary votes of ZES, SPS-PUPS-JS and 6 of 7 minorities representatives. Mirko Cvetković became the new Prime Minister, a non-partisan candidate endorsed by the Democratic Party.

=== Involvement of the United States ===
"We got him to flip over and join the pro-Europeans...he put a knife in Koštunica's back."

— US Ambassador Cameron Munter on Ivica Dačić

After the embassy of the United States was set on fire during the protest against Kosovo's declaration of independence on February 17, 2008, Ambassador Cameron Munter insisted on undermining Prime Minister Koštunica's party, DSS. His rationale was based on an allegation that Koštunica approved of an attack on the US embassy during demonstrations. Munter helped arrange a meeting for SPS leader Ivica Dačić with José Luis Rodríguez Zapatero and George Papandreou, who helped persuade Dačić to have his party form a majority pro-European coalition, as opposed to remaining in the bloc with DSS. After the election was over, SPS joined the coalition supported by the US and Dačić was promoted to Deputy Prime Minister.
