= 2007 Serbian parliamentary election =

- 21 January 2007
- All 250 seats in the National Assembly; 126 seats needed for a majority
- Turnout: 60.61% ▲1.87 pp
Party	Leader	Vote %	Seats	+/–
SRS	Tomislav Nikolić	29.07	81	−1
DS	Boris Tadić	23.08	64	+38
DSS–NS	Vojislav Koštunica	16.83	47	−15
G17+	Mlađan Dinkić	6.93	19	−12
SPS	Ivica Dačić	5.74	16	−6
LDP–GSS–SDU–LSV	Čedomir Jovanović	5.40	15	+8
Minority lists
VMSZ	József Kasza	1.32	3	+3
LZS	Sulejman Ugljanin	0.85	2	0
URS	Rajko Đurić	0.43	1	New
KSLP	Riza Halimi	0.43	1	New
RP	Srđan Šajn	0.37	1	New
This lists parties that won seats. See the complete results below.
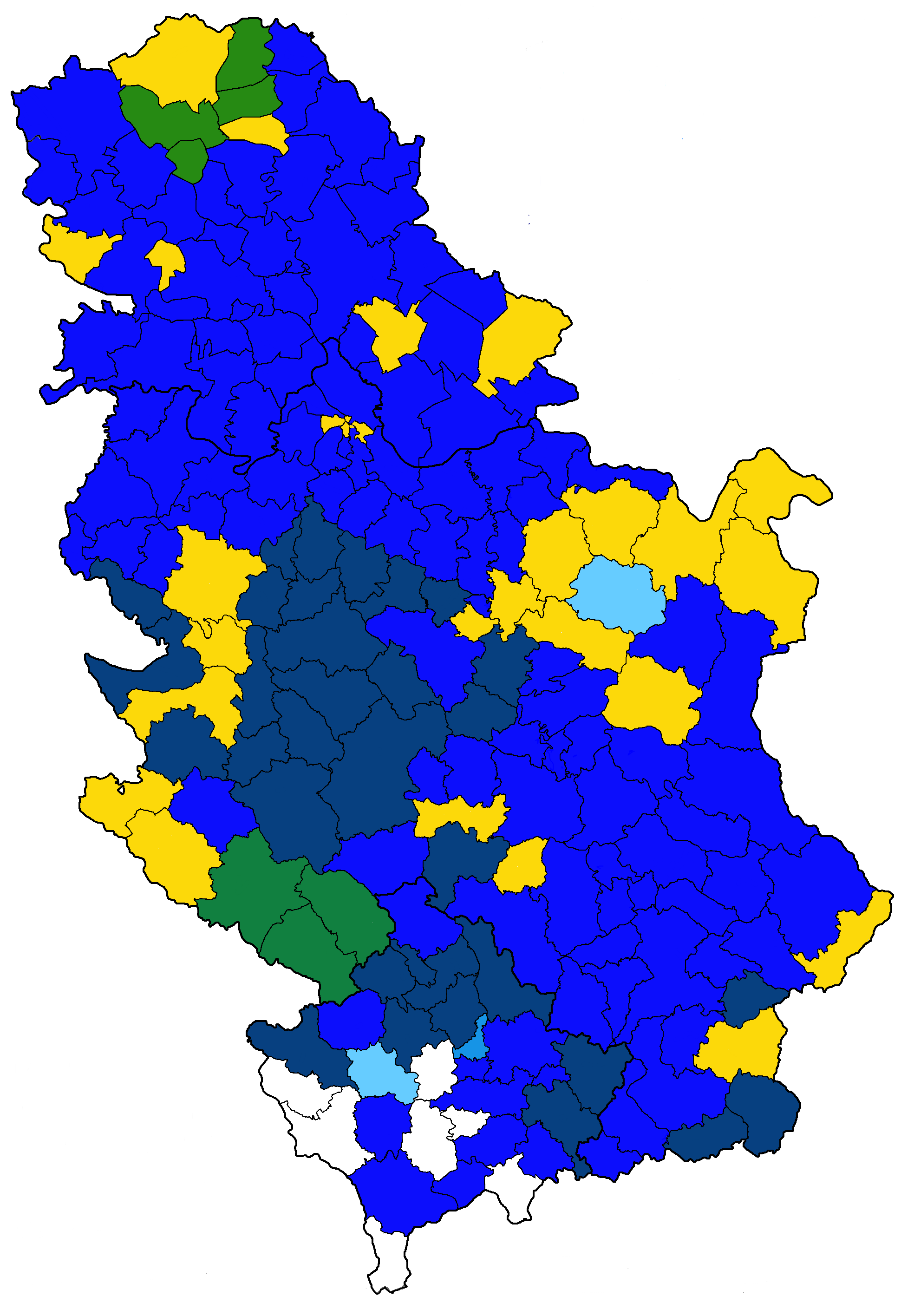
Results by municipalities
SRS DS DSS–NS G17+ SPO VMSZ LZS
Prime Minister before	Prime Minister after
Vojislav Koštunica; DSS	Vojislav Koštunica; DSS

Parliamentary elections were held in Serbia on 21 January 2007 to elect members of the National Assembly. The first session of the new National Assembly of the Republic of Serbia was held on 14 February 2007. The elections enabled the coalition of DS; DSS & G17+ to continue.

== Electoral system ==
The d'Hondt method was used to distribute parliamentary mandates following the election. Parties and coalitions had 10 days following the announcement of the final results to decide which candidates will take their allotted seats in parliament. Parties then had three months to negotiate a government.

Parties registering as ethnic minority parties (options 8, 10, 14, 17, 19 and 20) did not need to surpass the 5% threshold to gain seats in the parliament, but instead needed to pass a natural threshold at 0.4%. For the first time in a decade, Albanian parties from the Preševo Valley participated in the elections, but Kosovo Albanian parties continued their boycott of Serbian elections.

6,652,105 voters were eligible to vote, an increase of 14,000 voters when compared to the constitutional referendum held a few months before. 31,370 of the eligible voters were living abroad, and 7,082 were in prison.

== Electoral lists ==
Twenty party lists registered with the electoral commission before the deadline of 5 January 2007:

#	Ballot name	Ballot carrier	Main ideology	Political position	Note
1	Democratic Party – Boris Tadić; DS, DSHV, SDP, NDSV, BNS, NSSNM	Ružica Đinđić	Social liberalism	Centre to centre-left	
2	G17 Plus – Mlađan Dinkić; G17+	Mlađan Dinkić	Liberal conservatism	Centre-right	
3	Liberal Democratic Party – Civic Alliance of Serbia – Social Democratic Union – League of Social Democrats of Vojvodina – Čedomir Jovanović; LDP, GSS, SDU, LSV, DHSS	Čedomir Jovanović	Liberalism	Centre	
4	Serbian Radical Party – dr Vojislav Šešelj; SRS	Vojislav Šešelj	Ultranationalism	Far-right	
5	Democratic Party of Serbia – New Serbia – dr Vojislav Koštunica; DSS, NS, JS, SDPO	Vojislav Koštunica	Conservatism	Right-wing	
6	Strength of Serbia Movement – Bogoljub Karić; PSS	Milanka Karić	Conservatism	Centre-right	
7	Serbian Renewal Movement – Vuk Drašković; SPO, LS, NSS, ŽZK, SLPS	Vuk Drašković	Liberalism	Centre-right	
8	Alliance of Vojvodina Hungarians – József Kasza; VMSZ/SVM	József Kasza	Minority politics	Centre-right	^{M}
9	Party of United Pensioners of Serbia (PUPS) – dr Jovan Krkobabić and the Social Democratic Party (SDP) – dr Nebojša Čović; PUPS, SDP, SNP	Jovan Krkobabić	Social democracy	Centre-left	
10	Coalition List for Sandžak dr Sulejman Ugljanin; SDAS, SLPS, BDSS, RS, SDSS	Sulejman Ugljanin	Minority politics	Centre	^{M}
11	Socialist Party of Serbia; SPS	Ivica Dačić	Democratic socialism	Left-wing	
12	Branko Pavlović – Because it has to be better; ZŠMB	Branko Pavlović	Youth politics	Centre	
13	Coalition "Vojvodina Parties" – mr Igor Kurjački; VP, VGP, NV, SS, SMAPN, PRRS	Dušica Karabenč	Vojvodina autonomism	Left-wing	
14	Roma Union of Serbia – dr Rajko Đurić; URS, VDS	Rajko Đurić	Minority politics	Centre	^{M}
15	Reformist Party – dr Aleksandar Višnjić; RS	Aleksandar Višnjić	Reformism	Centre	
16	Democratic Community of Serbia – dr Obren Joksimović; DZS, PI	Obren Joksimović	Right-wing populism	Far-right	
17	Albanian Coalition of Preševo Valley; PVD/PDD, BDL/DUV	Riza Halimi	Minority politics	Centre-right	^{M}
18	Social Democracy – Nenad Vukasović; SD, SDS, KPS, SKMS	Vuk Obradović	Social democracy	Centre-left	
19	Coalition Hungarian Union – András Ágoston – Sándor Páll; VMDP/DSVM, VMDK/DZVM, HVIM/OP64Ž	Gyula László	Minority politics		^{M}
20	Roma Party – Srđan Šajn; RP	Srđan Šajn	Minority politics		^{M}

== Campaign ==
=== Slogans ===
The parties' campaign slogans for the 2007 election:

Party	English slogan	Serbian slogan
Democratic Party	Because life can't wait	Zato što život ne može da čeka Зато што живот не може да чека
G17 Plus	Expertise before politics	Stručnost ispred politike Стручност испред политике
Liberal-Democratic Party-Civic Alliance of Serbia-Social Democratic Union-League of Social Democrats of Vojvodina	It depends on us	Od nas zavisi Од нас зависи
Serbian Radical Party	So that things become better already today	Da već danas bude bolje Да већ данас буде боље
Democratic Party of Serbia / New Serbia	Long live Serbia	Živela Srbija; Живела Србија
Strength of Serbia Movement	Serbia has strength	Srbija ima snage Србија има снаге
Serbian Renewal Movement	It's worth fighting for	Vredi se boriti Вреди се борити
Socialist Party of Serbia	Serbia, Chin Up	Srbijo, glavu gore Србијо, главу горе
Alliance of Vojvodina Hungarians	New chance	Nova šansa Új esély (*)
List for Sandžak	For Sandžak in European Serbia	Za Sandžak u evropskoj Srbiji; За Санџак у европској Србији
Albanian Coalition from Preševo Valley	For better life of Albanians in Preševo Valley	Za bolji život Albanaca u Preševskoj dolini За бољи живот Албанаца у Прешевској долини

The change figure for the Democratic Party of Serbia/New Serbia list is in comparison to the 2003 result for the Democratic Party of Serbia; New Serbia was aligned to the Serbian Renewal Movement in 2003. The grouping headed by the Liberal Democratic Party is new: the Liberal Democratic Party split off from the Democratic Party in 2005; Civic Alliance of Serbia and the Social Democratic Union were part of the Democratic Party list in 2003; and the League of Social Democrats of Vojvodina were in a list with the Alliance of Vojvodina Hungarians in 2003. The Coalition List for Sandžak previously stood as part of the Democratic Party list.

== Results ==
The Republican Electoral Commission finally published the final results after the repetition of voting in several places:

Party	Votes	%	Seats	+/–
Serbian Radical Party	1,153,453	29.07	81	–1
Democratic Party coalition (Note: List included Democratic Party (60 seats), SDP (3) Democratic Alliance of Croats in Vojvodina (1))	915,854	23.08	64	+41
Democratic Party of Serbia − New Serbia coalition (Note: List included Democratic Party of Serbia (33 seats), New Serbia (10), United Serbia (2), Serbian Democratic Renewal Movement (2))	667,615	16.83	47	–10
G17 Plus	275,041	6.93	19	–12
Socialist Party of Serbia	227,580	5.74	16	–6
Liberal Democratic Party coalition (Note: List included Liberal Democratic Party (6 seats), League of Social Democrats of Vojvodina (4), Civic Alliance of Serbia (3), Social Democratic Union (1), Christian Democratic Party of Serbia (1))	214,262	5.40	15	+8
Serbian Renewal Movement coalition	134,147	3.38	0	–13
PUPS − SDP	125,342	3.16	0	–3
Strength of Serbia Movement	70,727	1.78	0	New
Alliance of Vojvodina Hungarians	52,510	1.32	3	+3
List for Sandžak (Note: Both seats won by Party of Democratic Action of Sandžak)	33,823	0.85	2	0
Roma Union of Serbia	17,128	0.43	1	New
Albanian Coalition of Preševo Valley (Note: Seat won by Party for Democratic Action)	16,973	0.43	1	New
Branko Pavlović — Because it has to be better	15,722	0.40	0	New
Roma Party	14,631	0.37	1	New
Hungarian Union Coalition	12,940	0.33	0	New
Vojvodina Parties	7,359	0.19	0	New
Democratic Community of Serbia	5,438	0.14	0	New
Social Democracy	4,909	0.12	0	0
Reformist Party	1,881	0.05	0	New
Total	3,967,335	100.00	250	0
Valid votes	3,967,335	98.38		
Invalid/blank votes	65,468	1.62		
Total votes	4,032,803	100.00		
Registered voters/turnout	6,653,851	60.61		
Source: Republican Electoral Commission

== Reactions ==
- Dutch foreign minister Ben Bot congratulated Boris Tadić with the result, stating "the fact that Mr. Tadić has doubled his position in the parliament is of great importance, since it means that the Serbian people value a "pro-European" course".
- EU foreign policy chief Javier Solana stated "The majority voted for forces that are democratic and pro-European", continuing "I hope very much there will be a speedy formation of a government that will be on the line of "pro-European" forces."
- German Foreign Minister Frank-Walter Steinmeier said "The radicals got most votes but nevertheless two thirds of the seats in parliament will go to "democratic" forces."
- Michael C. Polt, US ambassador to Serbia, congratulated Serbian people on results, stating that "the United States looks forward to continuing to work with you and your leadership as your country fulfills the promise of October 2000".
- Jean Asselborn, Deputy Prime Minister of Luxembourg, stated that EU should show support to Serbia, after "democratic" forces won the elections, as NATO did when Serbia was invited to join "Partnership for Peace" despite not cooperating with the ICTY.
- Sergey Baburin, Vice-president of the Russian State Duma stated “the parties to form the government will soon hear Martti Ahtisaari’s recommendations for the settlement of the Kosovo issue, and I deem their position unenviable. In my opinion, parties are making a big mistake by not letting Serbian Radicals partake in the government. Patriotic parties in Serbia are getting potentially stronger”.
