= Predrag Matejin =

Serbian politician

Predrag Matejin (Serbian Cyrillic: Предраг Матејин; 13 April 1963) is a politician in Serbia. He was a member of the Assembly of Vojvodina from 2012 to 2020, serving as a member of the Serbian Progressive Party.

== Private career ==
Matejin is a doctor specializing in plastic surgery. He lives in Zrenjanin.

== Politician ==
=== Provincial politics ===
Matejin was first elected to the Vojvodina assembly in the 2012 provincial election, winning Zrenjanin's first constituency seat. This election was won by the Democratic Party and its allies, and the Progressives served in opposition. Matejin was the leader of the Progressive Party's assembly group and was a member of the committee on health, social policy, and labour.

Vojvodina switched to a system of full proportional representation for the 2016 provincial election. Matejin was awarded the ninth position on the Progressive Party's electoral list and was re-elected when the list won a majority victory with sixty-three out of 120 mandates. There were rumours that he would be appointed to a position in the provincial executive, but this did not occur. He chaired the assembly's health committee and was not a candidate for re-election in 2020.

=== Municipal politics ===
Matejin received the (largely ceremonial) final position on the Progressive Party's list for the Zrenjanin city assembly in the 2012 Serbian local elections. Election from this position was a mathematical impossibility, and indeed he was not elected when the list won twenty-four out of sixty-seven mandates.

He received the second position on the Progressive list in the 2016 local elections and was elected to the city assembly when the list won a majority victory with thirty-five mandates. He did not seek re-election in 2020.

== Electoral record ==
=== Provincial (Vojvodina) ===
2012 Vojvodina assembly election Zrenjanin I (constituency seat) - First and Second Rounds
Predrag Matejin	Let's Get Vojvodina Moving (Affiliation: Serbian Progressive Party)	6,111	30.16	9,756	55.51
Vladimir Vasiljev	League of Social Democrats of Vojvodina	2,963	14.62	7,819	44.49
Milan Zvekić (incumbent)	Choice for a Better Vojvodina (Affiliation: Democratic Party)	2,418	11.93		
Dragan Basta	Socialist Party of Serbia–Party of United Pensioners of Serbia–United Serbia–Social Democratic Party of Serbia	2,415	11.92		
Danilo Babić	Serbian Radical Party	1,396	6.89		
Zdravko Deurić	Citizens' Group: Movement for Equality – I Love Zrenjanin	1,353	6.68		
Dragan Bosić	Democratic Party of Serbia	1,346	6.64		
Nikola Đurić	U-Turn	831	4.10		
Aleksandar Arvaji	Coalition: For the Survival of Zrenjanin – United Regions of Serbia – Dušan Juvanin	641	3.16		
Arpad Seke	Alliance of Vojvodina Hungarians	529	2.61		
Ištvan Hanđa	Democratic Fellowship of Vojvodina Hungarians	258	1.27		
Total valid votes		20,261	100	17,575	100
