= 1993 Serbian parliamentary election =

- 19 December 1993
- All 250 seats in the National Assembly; 126 seats needed for a majority
- Turnout: 61.30% (▼8.28pp)
Party	Leader	Vote %	Seats	+/–
SPS	Slobodan Milošević	38.21	123	+22
DEPOS	Vuk Drašković	17.34	45	+14
SRS	Vojislav Šešelj	14.43	39	−34
DS	Dragoljub Mićunović	12.06	29	+23
DSS	Vojislav Koštunica	5.29	7	−11
Minority lists
VMDK	András Ágoston	2.73	5	−4
PVD–DPS	Riza Halimi	0.71	2	+2
This lists parties that won seats. See the complete results below.
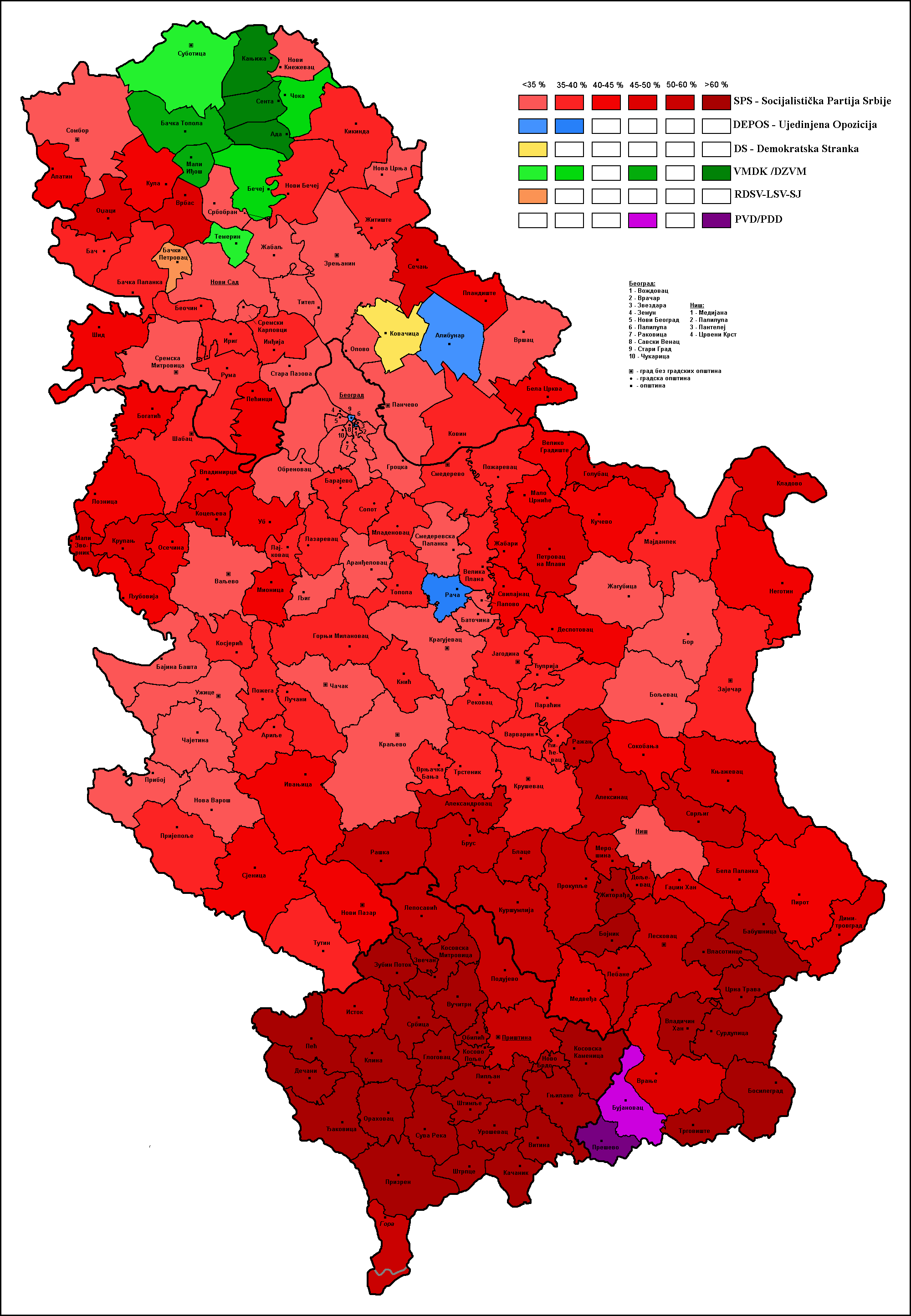
Results by municipality
Prime Minister before	Prime Minister after
Nikola Šainović; SPS	Mirko Marjanović; SPS

Parliamentary elections were held in the Yugoslav republic of Serbia on 19 December 1993, to elect members of the National Assembly. The Socialist Party of Serbia (SPS) of Slobodan Milošević emerged as the largest party in the National Assembly, winning 123 of the 250 seats. Following the elections, the SPS formed a government with New Democracy, which had run as part of the Democratic Movement of Serbia coalition.

== Background ==
The elections were boycotted by political parties of ethnic Kosovo Albanians, who made up about 17% of the population. The Albanian minority from other parts of Serbia were represented by the Party for Democratic Action.

== Electoral lists ==
Following electoral lists are electoral lists that received seats in the National Assembly after the 1993 election:

#	Ballot name	Representative	Main ideology	Political position
1	Socialist Party of Serbia – Slobodan Milošević; SPS	Slobodan Milošević	Populism	Left-wing
2	DEPOS – United Opposition; SPO, ND, GSS	Vuk Drašković	Anti-Milošević	Big tent
3	Serbian Radical Party – dr Vojislav Šešelj; SRS	Vojislav Šešelj	Ultranationalism	Far-right
4	Democratic Party – Dragoljub Mićunović; DS	Zoran Đinđić	Liberalism	Centre-right
5	Democratic Party of Serbia – DSS – dr Vojislav Koštunica; DSS	Vojislav Koštunica	Conservatism	Centre-right
6	Democratic Fellowship of Vojvodina Hungarians – András Ágoston; VMDK/DZVM	András Ágoston	Minority politics	Centre
7	Party for Democratic Action and Democratic Party of Albanians Coalition; PVD/PDD, PDS/DPA	Ramadan Dači	Minority politics	Centre

== Results ==
Party	Votes	%	Seats	+/–
Socialist Party of Serbia	1,576,287	38.21	123	+22
DEPOS – United Opposition	715,564	17.34	45	+14
Serbian Radical Party	595,467	14.43	39	–34
Democratic Party	497,582	12.06	29	+23
Democratic Party of Serbia	218,056	5.29	7	–11
Democratic Fellowship of Vojvodina Hungarians	112,456	2.73	5	–4
Peasants Party of Serbia	65,623	1.59	0	–3
People's Party	48,331	1.17	0	0
Party of Serbian Unity	41,362	1.00	0	–5
Democratic Coalition for Vojvodina (RDSV–LSV–SJ)	41,097	1.00	0	–2
United Left	34,366	0.83	0	0
Party for Democratic Action – Democratic Party of Albanians	29,342	0.71	2	+2
Foreign Currency Depositors Party	17,452	0.42	0	New
Serb Democratic Party	15,447	0.37	0	0
Serbian National Renewal	15,187	0.37	0	0
New Communist Movement of Yugoslavia	9,854	0.24	0	0
People's Party and People's Radical Party	8,590	0.21	0	0
People's Radical Party	8,347	0.20	0	0
Communist Party of Yugoslavia in Serbia	8,104	0.20	0	New
Social Democratic Party	5,959	0.14	0	0
Reform Democratic Party of Sandžak	5,530	0.13	0	New
Foreign Currency Depositors Association	4,877	0.12	0	New
Democratic Alliance of Croats in Vojvodina	3,946	0.10	0	0
Serbian Royalist Movement	3,627	0.09	0	New
Workers' Party of Serbia	3,019	0.07	0	0
Movement for the Protection of Human Rights	2,950	0.07	0	0
Agrarian Party	2,790	0.07	0	New
Democratic Reform Party of Muslims	2,697	0.07	0	–1
Serbian Royalist Bloc	2,402	0.06	0	New
Progressive Party — Progressives	2,216	0.05	0	0
United Social Democracy	2,041	0.05	0	New
Bunjevac-Šokac Party	1,745	0.04	0	0
New Green Party "The Greens"	1,288	0.03	0	0
Green Party	827	0.02	0	0
Movement of Vlachs and Romanians of Yugoslavia	725	0.02	0	0
Communist Party of Yugoslavia	544	0.01	0	0
Federal Party of Yugoslavs	524	0.01	0	0
Movement "Vojvoda Vuk 1903–1993"	509	0.01	0	New
Party for Peace and Prosperity	420	0.01	0	0
New Serbia Movement	323	0.01	0	New
Yugoslav Democratic Party	277	0.01	0	0
Liberal Party of Valjevo	275	0.01	0	New
Democratic Union of the Centre	180	0.00	0	0
Party of Multi-Party Socialism	149	0.00	0	New
Liberal Party and Belgrade Party	134	0.00	0	0
Republican Party	104	0.00	0	0
Independents	17,017	0.41	0	0
Total	4,125,609	100.00	250	0
Valid votes	4,125,609	96.00		
Invalid/blank votes	171,824	4.00		
Total votes	4,297,433	100.00		
Registered voters/turnout	7,010,389	61.30		
Source: Republican Electoral Commission
