= András Ágoston =

Serbian politician (born 1944)

- Occupation: Politician

András Ágoston (Serbian: Андраш Агоштон, romanized: Andraš Agošton; born 1944) is a Serbian retired politician. An ethnic Hungarian, he led the Democratic Fellowship of Vojvodina Hungarians (VMDK) from 1990 to 1997 and then led the breakaway Democratic Party of Vojvodina Hungarians (VMDP) from 1997 to 2012.

He was one of the leaders of the coalition "Hungarian Union" on 2007 Serbian parliamentary election together with Sándor Páll that won no seats. He was then a member of the "Hungarian Coalition" together with István Pásztors Alliance of Vojvodina Hungarians and Sándor Pálls Democratic Fellowship of Vojvodina Hungarians, created for the purpose of the 2008 Serbian parliamentary election.
