= Saša Todorović =

Serbian politician

Saša Todorović (Serbian Cyrillic: Саша Тодоровић; born 1974) is a politician in Serbia. He served in the Assembly of Vojvodina from 2008 to 2014 and was the mayor of Sombor from 2014 to 2016. Originally a member of the far-right Serbian Radical Party (Srpska radikalna stranka, SRS), he later joined the breakaway Serbian Progressive Party (Srpska napredna stranka, SNS).

== Early life and career ==
Todorović was born in Sombor, in what was then the Socialist Republic of Serbia in the Socialist Federal Republic of Yugoslavia. He graduated from the University of Novi Sad's Department of History, and from 2002 to 2013 he worked as a history teacher at a variety of schools in Sombor.

== Politician ==
From 2004 to 2015, Vojvodina used a system of mixed proportional representation for provincial elections. Todorović was given the twenty-sixth position on the Radical Party's electoral list in the 2008 provincial election and was awarded a mandate when the list won twenty seats. (During this period, mandates were awarded to political parties or coalitions rather than individual candidates, and it was common practice for the mandates to be assigned out of numerical order. Todorović's position on the list had no specific bearing on his chances of election.) The coalition around the Democratic Party (Demokratska stranka, DS) won a majority victory, and the Radicals served in opposition. Todorović also led the SRS list for Sombor in the 2008 Serbian local elections and was elected to the city assembly when the list won twenty-three mandates. As at the provincial level, the Radicals served in opposition.

The Radical Party experienced a serious split later in 2008, with several members joining the more moderate Progressive Party under the leadership of Tomislav Nikolić and Aleksandar Vučić. Todorović sided with the Progressives.

Serbia's electoral system was revised in 2011, such that mandates were awarded in numerical order to candidates on successful lists. He was given the fourteenth position on the SNS's list in the 2012 Vojvodina provincial election and was re-elected when the list won exactly fourteen mandates. The DS alliance again won the election, and Todorović continued to serve in opposition. He also received the eleventh position on the SNS list for Sombor in the 2012 local elections and was re-elected when the list won eleven seats. The DS initially continued in government at the city level as well.

During his second term in the provincial assembly, Todorović was deputy chair of the committee for co-operation with the committees of the National Assembly of Serbia in exercising the competencies of the province. He was also a member of the committee on education, science, culture, youth, and sports.

Shifting political alliances brought the Progressives to power in Sombor in April 2014, and Todorović was chosen as the city's new mayor. By virtue of holding this position, he was required to resign from the provincial assembly, which he did on 23 September.

Todorović led the Progressives to victory in Sombor in the 2016 local elections. He did not continue as mayor after the election and resigned from the city assembly on 19 July 2016. He was subsequently appointed as a consular officer at the embassy of the Republic of Serbia in Sweden.
