= Rajko Đurić =

Serbian Romani writer (1947–2020)

(undated)

Raјko Đurić (Serbian Cyrillic: Рајко Ђурић, Romani: Raiko Juric; 3 October 1947 – 2 November 2020) was a Serbian Romani writer and academic. He was also politically active as the leader of one of Romani parties in Serbia - Roma Union of Serbia.

== Biography ==
Đurić was born on 3 October 1947 in Malo Orašje, Smederevo, SR Serbia, SFR Yugoslavia. He studied philosophy at the University of Belgrade Faculty of Philosophy (1967–1972). In 1986 he obtained a Doctorate of Sociology writing the dissertation Culture of the Roma in S.F.R. Yugoslavia. In 1991 he moved to Berlin avoiding involvement in the Yugoslavian wars.

He wrote more than 500 articles as well as 34 books and he has also collaborated with the production of the films I Even Met Happy Gypsies (Skupljaci perja) by Aleksandar Petrović; he is also the co-writer of the film Time of the Gypsies (Dom za vešanje) by Emir Kusturica.

Until leaving Yugoslavia, was the chief redactor for the cultural section of the newspaper Politika in Belgrade. He was the President of the International Romani Union and was the General Secretary of the Romani Centre of International PEN. His literary works have been translated into more than five languages. In 2011, he co-founded a Romani academy of arts and sciences in Belgrade and was its president until his death.

In politics, Rajko Đurić defended the interests of the Romani people in Serbia. In the 2007 Serbian parliamentary election, Đurić presented and led a list of 249 candidates for the Roma Union of Serbia. He obtained 17,128 votes, or 0.42% of the vote, which allowed him to be elected to the National Assembly of Serbia. In the 2008 Serbian presidential election, Rajko Đurić supported the candidacy of outgoing President Boris Tadić in the first round of the ballot. In the early 2008 Serbian parliamentary election, Đurić once again headed the list of the Roma Union of Serbia, which included 200 candidates.

Đurić died on 2 November 2020 in Belgrade at the age of 73.

== Writings ==
- Bi kheresko-Bi limoresko, 1975
- Purano svato o dur themestar, 1980
- A i U - A thai U, 1982
- Kultur der Roma und interkulturelle Beziehungen, 1988–1990
- Paradigmen in der Kultur der Roma, 1992
- Die Kultur der Roma und Sinti, 1993
