= For a European Serbia =

Serbian political coalition

For a European Serbia За европску Србију Za evropsku Srbiju
- Abbreviation: ZES
- Leader: Boris Tadić
- Parliamentary leader: Nada Kolundžija
- Ballot carrier: Dragoljub Mićunović
- Founded: 2008
- Dissolved: 2011
- Succeeded by: Choice for a Better Life; United Regions of Serbia
- Headquarters: Belgrade
- Ideology: Catch-all alliance; Third Way; Pro-Europeanism
- Slogan: "For a strong, stable... European Serbia" (Za jaku, stabilnu... Evropsku Srbiju)

Website
- zaevropskusrbiju.rs

For a European Serbia (Serbian: За европску Србију / Za evropsku Srbiju, ZES) was a big tent and pro-EU electoral alliance, led by Boris Tadić, which participated in the 2008 Serbian parliamentary election. It received 38.42% of the popular vote, translating into 102 seats in the 250-seat Parliament of Serbia.

== History ==
=== 2008 parliamentary election ===
President of Serbia, Boris Tadić has gathered a large pro-EU coalition for the 2008 parliamentary election, around his centre-left Democratic Party (DS) and centre-right G17 Plus. On the list 166 candidates are from DS, 60 from G17+ and 8 members from each of the following minor parties Social Democratic Party of Serbia (SDPS) and League of Social Democrats of Vojvodina (LSV). 25 seats are guaranteed for G17+, 4 seats and a Ministry in the future government for both SDPS and Serbian Renewal Movement (SPO) and 3 seats for LSV. However, if the alliance wins over 100 seats, their seats will gradually increase. The list's name is For a European Serbia – Boris Tadić and its leader is Dragoljub Mićunović. Boris Tadić claimed victory at the election, despite only gaining a plurality.

The victory was contested by the opposing Tomislav Nikolić, of the far-right Serbian Radical Party (SRS), which received 29.46% of the popular vote. In the election aftermath, ZES alliance formed a big tent coalition government together with the SPS-PUPS-JS electoral alliance and ethnic minority parties (Hungarian Coalition, List for Sandžak) on 7 July 2008, after securing 128 seats in the 250-seat parliament. This coalition government ruled Serbia until the 2012 elections.

=== 2008 presidential election ===
On 3 February 2008, Boris Tadić won in the second round of the presidential election, for the second time, his opponent Tomislav Nikolić, of the far-right SRS. He held that position until April 5, 2012, when he resigned, and scheduled new presidential elections, which would coincide with the parliamentary election on 6 May 2012.

== Coalition members ==
Party	Abbr.	Leader	Ideology	Political position	MPs (2008)
Democratic Party; Демократска странка Demokratska stranka	DS	Boris Tadić	Social democracy Social liberalism Pro-Europeanism	Centre-left	64 / 250
G17 Plus; Г17 плус G17 plus	G17+	Mlađan Dinkić	Liberal conservatism Economic liberalism Pro-Europeanism	Centre-right	24 / 250
League of Social Democrats of Vojvodina; Лига социјалдемократа Војводине; Liga socijaldemokrata Vojvodine	LSV	Nenad Čanak	Social democracy Autonomism; Pro-Europeanism	Centre-left	5 / 250
Social Democratic Party of Serbia; Социјалдемократска партија Србије; Socijaldemokratska partija Srbije	SDPS	Rasim Ljajić	Social democracy Populism; Pro-Europeanism	Centre-left	4 / 250
Serbian Renewal Movement; Српски покрет обнове Srpski pokret obnove	SPO	Vuk Drašković	Monarchism; Economic liberalism Pro-Europeanism	Centre-right	4 / 250
Democratic Alliance of Croats in Vojvodina; Демократски савез Хрвата у Војводини; Demokratski savez Hrvata u Vojvodini	DSHV	Petar Kuntić	Croat minority interests Autonomism; Pro-Europeanism	Centre-right	1 / 250

== Electoral results ==
=== Parliamentary election ===
National Assembly of Serbia
Year	Popular vote	% of popular vote	# of seats	Seat change	Status
2008	1,590,200	38.42%	102 / 250	▲15	government

=== Presidential election ===
President of Serbia
Year	Candidate	Party	#	1st round vote	% of vote	#	2nd round vote	% of vote
2008	Boris Tadić	DS	2nd	1,457,030	35.39%	1st	2,304,467	50.31%
