= Borisz Bájity =

Serbian politician (born 1982)

- Борис Бајић; Boris Bajić

Member of the National Assembly of the Republic of Serbia
- Incumbent
- Assumed office 6 February 2024

Substitute Member of the Parliamentary Assembly of the Council of Europe
- Incumbent
- Assumed office 15 April 2024

Personal details
- Born: 1982 (age 43–44) Subotica, SAP Vojvodina, SR Serbia, SFR Yugoslavia
- Party: VMSZ

Borisz Bájity (Serbian Cyrillic: Борис Бајић, romanized: Boris Bajić; born 1982) is a Serbian politician from the country's Hungarian community. He is a delegate in Serbia's Hungarian National Council and has served in the National Assembly of Serbia since February 2024. Bájity is a member of the Alliance of Vojvodina Hungarians (VMSZ).

== Early life and career ==
Bájity was born in Subotica in what was then the Socialist Autonomous Province of Vojvodina in the Socialist Republic of Serbia, Socialist Federal Republic of Yugoslavia. He holds a master's degree from the University of Novi Sad Faculty of Law. After completing an internship, he began working for the provincial government's secretariat for education, regulations, governance, and national minority communities. He was appointed as first deputy secretary-general of the Assembly of Vojvodina in October 2017.

== Politician ==
Bájity appeared in the eighty-ninth position on the VMSZ's electoral list in the 2016 Serbian parliamentary election and the fiftieth position in the 2020 parliamentary election. Election from either of these positions was not a realistic prospect, and he was not elected when the party won four and nine seats, respectively.

He later appeared in the thirtieth position out of thirty-five on the Hungarian Unity list for Serbia's Hungarian National Council in the 2022 election. The outcome of the election was not in doubt; no other lists participated, and Hungarian Unity won every seat. He is now a member of the council's committee on official language and use of writing.

=== Parliamentarian ===
Bájity appeared in the third position on the VMSZ's list in the 2023 Serbian parliamentary election and was elected to the national assembly when the list won six seats. He is a deputy member of the committee on the rights of the child, the committee on human and minority rights and gender equality, and the committee on the judiciary, public administration, and local self government. In the assembly, the VMSZ supports Serbia's government led by the Serbian Progressive Party (SNS).

Bájity was elected as a vice-president of the VMSZ in March 2024. He also became a substitute member of Serbia's delegation to the Parliamentary Assembly of the Council of Europe (PACE) on 15 April 2024. He serves with the European People's Party (EPP) group and is an alternate member of the committee on equality and non-discrimination.

Bájity has received the symbolic next-to-last position (twenty-ninth out of thirty) on the VMSZ's electoral list for the Novi Sad city assembly in the 2024 Serbian local elections.
