= Social Liberal Party of Sandžak =

Social Liberal Party of Sandžak Socijalno-liberalna partija Sandžaka
- Serbian name: Социјално-либерална партија Санџака
- Leader: Bajram Omeragić
- Dissolved: 20 April 2010
- Ideology: Bosniak minority interests

The Social Liberal Party of Sandžak (Socijalno-liberalna partija Sandžaka) was a centre-left Bosniak minority political party in Serbia. Its only leader was Bajram Omeragić.

== History ==
During the renewed registration in April 2010, the party did not register and merged into the Party of Democratic Action of Sandžak, to which it transferred its only seat.

== Electoral results ==
=== Parliamentary elections ===
Year	Popular vote	% of popular vote	# of seats	Seat change	Coalitions	Government
2003	481,249	12.58%	1 / 250	▲1	With DS–GSS–DC–SDU	opposition
2007	33,823	0.84%	2 / 250	▲1	List for Sandžak	opposition
2008	38,148	0.92%	1 / 250	▼1	List for Sandžak	government

== See also ==
- Liberalism in Serbia
- Sandžak
