= Roma Union of Serbia =

Political party in Serbia

Roma Union of Serbia Унија Рома Србије
- Abbreviation: URS
- Leader: Miloš Mihajlović
- Founder: Rajko Đurić
- Founded: May 2004; 22 years ago
- Registered: 26 January 2012; 14 years ago
- Headquarters: Mije Jovanovića 5, Bogatić
- Ideology: Romani minority interests
- European affiliation: European Free Alliance
- International affiliation: International Romani Union
- Colours: Light blue
- National Assembly: 0 / 250
- Assembly of Vojvodina: 0 / 120
- City Assembly of Belgrade: 0 / 110

Website
- unijaromasrbije.org

Roma Union of Serbia (Serbian: Унија Рома Србије, romanised: Unija Roma Srbije, abbr. URS) is a political party in Serbia, representing the Romani minority. It was founded in May 2004. Its current leader is Miloš Mihajlović.

Miloš Paunković and Rajko Đurić previously served as party presidents. The party took part in the 2007 Serbian parliamentary election as an independent list and won one seat.

URS announced that it would take part in the 2023 parliamentary and local elections.
