= List for Sandžak =

List for Sandžak Листа за Санџак Lista za Sandžak
- Abbreviation: LZS
- President: Sulejman Ugljanin
- Founded: 7 October 1996; 29 years ago
- Dissolved: ~2012; 14 years ago
- Ideology: Bosniak minority interests
- Political position: Right-wing
- Colors: Green
- Slogan: For Sandžak in European Serbia
- National Assembly: 0 / 250

The List for Sandžak (Bosnian: Листа за Санџак, romanized: Lista za Sandžak, abbr. LZS) was a minority coalition representing ethnic Bosniaks in Serbia. It was led by Sulejman Ugljanin and included:

- Party of Democratic Action of Sandžak
- Bosniak Democratic Party of Sandžak
- Social Liberal Party of Sandžak
- Sandžak Reform Party
- Sandžak Social Democratic Party

At its foundation on 7 October 1996 and the general election in 1997, it won three new seats in the National Assembly. In 1998, the coalition accused Slobodan Milošević's government of "hatred, hostility and continuing discrimination" against Muslims. At the legislative election in 2007, it has won two seats in the National Assembly.
