= Vojvodina Parties =

Coalition Vojvodina parties (Serbian: Коалиција "Војвођанске партије", Koalicija "Vojvođanske partije") was a political alliance in the last legislative elections in Serbia, on 21 January, 2007. The alliance won 0.18% of the popular vote, and no seats in the parliament. The alliance was formed by the Vojvodina's Party, Civic Movement of Vojvodina, Our Vojvodina, Party of Syrmia, Party of Minority Investors, Pensioners and Unemployed and the Pensioner-Workers' Party of Serbia. The leader of the political alliance was Igor Kurjački.
