= Roma Party =

Political party in Serbia

Roma Party Ромска партија
- Abbreviation: RP
- President: Srđan Šajn
- Founded: 15 November 2003; 22 years ago
- Ideology: Romani minority interests
- Colours: Green; Blue; Red
- National Assembly: 0 / 250

Party flag

The Roma Party (Serbian: Ромска партија, romanized: Romska partija, abbr. RP) is a political party in Serbia representing the Romani minority. Founded in 2003, it has been led by Srđan Šajn since its foundation. The party was represented in the National Assembly from 2007 to 2008, and from 2012 to 2014 on the list of the Serbian Progressive Party. It did not run in the 2026 parliamentary election, instead backing the Student List.

== History ==
The Roma Party was founded on 15 November 2003 and is registered as a political party of the Romani national minority, led by Šajn. In the 2007 election, its list "Roma Party – Srđan Šajn" won 14,631 votes (0.37%) and one seat, which went to Šajn. It lost the seat in the 2008 election, when it won 9,103 votes. In the 2012 election, the party ran on the "Let's Get Serbia Moving" list led by the Serbian Progressive Party (SNS), on which Šajn was elected to the National Assembly again.

The party ran alone again in the 2022 election, with Saćip Saćipović as the first candidate on its list; it won 6,393 votes (0.17%) and no seats.

In June 2026, ahead of the snap parliamentary election, the party launched a campaign called "Don't sell your vote", urging socially vulnerable citizens, many of them Roma, to resist pressure to sell their votes. On 13 September, it announced that it would run independently, having left talks with other Roma parties, but on 2 October it instead backed the Student List, saying that almost all anti-government parties had sided with it.

== Electoral performance ==
=== Parliamentary elections ===
National Assembly
Year	Leader	Popular vote	% of popular vote	#	# of seats	Seat change	Coalition	Status	Ref.
2007	Srđan Šajn	14,631	0.37%	15th	1 / 250	New	–	Opposition	
2008	Srđan Šajn	9,103	0.22%	▲12th	0 / 250	▼1	–	Extra-parliamentary	
2012	Srđan Šajn	940,659	25.16%	▲1st	1 / 250	▲1	PS	Support	
2014	Srđan Šajn	Did not participate			0 / 250	▼1	–	Extra-parliamentary	–
2016	Srđan Šajn	Did not participate			0 / 250	0	–	Extra-parliamentary	–
2020	Srđan Šajn	Did not participate			0 / 250	0	–	Extra-parliamentary	–
2022	Srđan Šajn	6,393	0.17%	18th	0 / 250	0	–	Extra-parliamentary	
2023	Srđan Šajn	Did not participate			0 / 250	0	–	Extra-parliamentary	–
2026	Srđan Šajn	Did not participate			0 / 250	0	Supported SL	Extra-parliamentary	
