= 2008 Vojvodina provincial election =

Provincial elections were held for the unicameral Assembly of Serbia's northern Autonomous Province of Vojvodina on 11 May 2008, with a second-round to be held on 25 May 2008. They were scheduled by the Speaker of the National Assembly of the Republic of Serbia Oliver Dulić on 29 December 2007, as required per the Constitutional Law adopted by the National Assembly of Serbia on 30 September 2006 that proclaimed the new Constitution.

Negotiations regarding the new electoral law in the current provincial assembly had failed. The Democratic Party wanted to add 12 guaranteed seats in the parliament for national minorities next to the existing 120, but the proposal didn't reach much overall support. The League of Social Democrats of Vojvodina wanted to replace the parallel voting (60 through popular vote and 60 through representative) with the more ordinary party-list proportional representation, but that would require changing the Statute of the Autonomous Province of Vojvodina. The present electoral law is favored by the Socialist Party of Serbia.

In the second-round, SRS, DSS-NS and SPS-PUPS decided to cooperate.

== Lists approved by Provincial Electoral Commission ==
1. "Za evropsku Vojvodinu, Demokratska stranka – G17 plus, Boris Tadić"

The Democratic Party and G17 Plus have formed a coalition that will go at the election under the list "For a European Vojvodina, Democratic Party-G17 Plus, Boris Tadić". The coalition was also joined by the Serbian Renewal Movement. If coalition gets support from voters, Bojan Pajtić will spend another mandate as the President of the Executive Council of Vojvodina (Provincial government).

2. "Zajedno za Vojvodinu – Nenad Čanak"

The "Together for Vojvodina - Nenad Čanak" alliance will stand again as in the last election in 2004, with minor changes. The alliance is formed by the several mostly regionalist political parties including League of Vojvodina Social Democrats, Democratic Vojvodina, Vojvodina Union - Vojvodina my home, Union of Socialists of Vojvodina, Vojvodinian Movement, Democratic Union of Croats.

3. "Liberalno demokratska partija - Čedomir Jovanović"

Coalition from elections for Serbian parliament - Liberal Democratic Party, the Social Democratic Union and the Christian Democratic Party of Serbia - will run on Vojvodina parliamentary elections. Milivoj Vrebalov, president of Novi Bečej municipality is candidate No. 1 on this list.

4. "Srpska radikalna stranka - Tomislav Nikolić"

As well as on elections for Parliament of Serbia, Serbian Radical Party will run alone in race for seats of the Provincial parliament. They already offered cooperation in formation of new provincial government to DSS and SPS. Bearer of the list is Milorad Mirčić.

5. "Socijalistička partija Srbije - Partija ujedinjenih penzionera Srbije"

The Socialist Party of Serbia and the Party of United Pensioners of Serbia will take part in Provincial elections, with Dušan Bajatović as list bearer.

6. "Demokratska stranka Srbije - Nova Srbija"

The Populist Coalition from Serbian parliamentary elections, composed by the Democratic Party of Serbia (DSS) and New Serbia (NS) will also run together on Provincial level, with 80% of seats designated for DSS, and 20% for NS. Bearer of the list is Zoran Lončar, minister of education in former government, and the president of the Provincial council of DSS.

7. "Mađarska koalicija - István Pásztor"

Leader of the Alliance of Vojvodina Hungarians, Pásztor István is the bearer of "Hungarian coalition", an alliance of all ethnic Hungarian political parties in Vojvodina, which will run together, but are expected to become post-electoral partners with pro-European coalition.

8. "Grupa građana «Maja Gojković» - Maja Gojković"

Mayor of Novi Sad, Maja Gojković, with civic group with which she is running for Novi Sad city assembly, also takes part in Provincial election.

9. "Vojvodina je snaga Srbije – mr Igor Kurjački"

Igor Kurjački, former member of League of Vojvodina Social Democrats, formed his own list that will run the electoral race.

== Results ==
| Party | Proportional | | | Constituency | | | Total seats |
| Party | Votes | % | Seats | Votes | % | Seats | Total seats |
|---|---|---|---|---|---|---|---|
| For a European Vojvodina | 354,198 | 34.78 | 23 | | | 41 | 64 |
| Serbian Radical Party | 310,599 | 30.50 | 20 | | | 4 | 24 |
| Together for Vojvodina | 86,653 | 8.51 | 5 | | | 1 | 6 |
| Hungarian Coalition | 77,390 | 7.60 | 5 | | | 4 | 9 |
| Democratic Party of Serbia–New Serbia | 59,248 | 5.82 | 4 | | | 2 | 6 |
| Socialist Party–Party of United Pensioners | 57,093 | 5.61 | 3 | | | 2 | 5 |
| Liberal Democratic Party | 45,313 | 4.45 | 0 | | | 1 | 1 |
| Vojvodina is the Strength of Serbia | 6,996 | 0.69 | 0 | | | 0 | 0 |
| Civic groups | 20,937 | 2.06 | 0 | | | 5 | 5 |
| Total | 1,018,427 | 100.00 | 60 | | | 60 | 120 |
| Registered voters/turnout | 1,720,818 | – | | 1,720,818 | – | | |
Source: PIK, B92

== See also ==
- Parliament of Vojvodina
- Vojvodina
- Politics of Vojvodina
- 2008 Serbian elections in Kosovo
