= Democratic Fellowship of Vojvodina Hungarians =

Political party in Serbia

Democratic Fellowship of Vojvodina Hungarians Демократска заједница војвођанских Мађара Demokratska zajednica vojvođanskih Mađara Vajdasági Magyarok Demokratikus Közössége
- Abbreviation: VMDK, DZVM
- Leader: Áron Csonka
- Founder: András Ágoston
- Founded: 31 March 1990
- Headquarters: Republikanska 144, Bečej
- Ideology: Hungarian minority interests; Regionalism
- Political position: Centre
- Colours: Green
- National Assembly: 0 / 250
- Assembly of Vojvodina: 0 / 120

Website
- vmdk.org.rs

The Democratic Fellowship of Vojvodina Hungarians (Hungarian: Vajdasági Magyarok Demokratikus Közössége, abbr. VMDK; Serbian: Демократска заједница војвођанских Мађара, romanised: Demokratska zajednica vojvođanskih Mađara, abbr. DZVM) is a political party in Serbia, representing the Hungarian minority.

Established in 1990, it was first led by András Ágoston and then by Sándor Páll until his death in 2010. As of 2021 it is led by Áron Csonka. The party's headquarters are in Bečej. It was the first party of the Hungarian minority in Serbia, and it had MPs in several compositions of the National Assembly of Serbia during the 1990s. However, the Alliance of Vojvodina Hungarians took the primate among Hungarian voters in 1997, and VMDK has seen only sporadic participation in the National Assembly and the Parliament of Vojvodina since. It was a part of the United for the Victory of Serbia coalition in the 2022 general election, but it did not win any seats.

== History ==
On 19 December 1989, in the eve of multi-party system in Serbia, a group of 11 activists started an initiative for creation of an authentic organisation of Hungarians in Serbia. Democratic Fellowship of Vojvodina Hungarians was formed on 31 March 1990 in Doroslovo, a village in northern Vojvodina. Its first leader was András Ágoston. On the first post-communist parliamentary elections in Serbia held the same year, they won 2.64% of the vote, earning 8 seats in the National Assembly.

Amidst the growing ethnic tensions, the Yugoslav Wars of the 1990s and pressure from Serbian nationalism, the party radicalised their programme and demanded a strong autonomy for Hungarians in Serbia, similar to ones sought by Serbs in Croatia and Bosnia at the time. Since the new course was perceived as too radical, several parties split from VMDK in 1994, and the Alliance of Vojvodina Hungarians went off to become the dominant party among Serbian Hungarians. In 1997, Ágoston left the VMDK, forming the Democratic Party of Vojvodina Hungarians. Sándor Páll took over as the president of VMDK, but the party has never regained its previous influence.

In the 1992 parliamentary elections, the party won 2.98% of the popular vote and 9 seats in the National Assembly. In the 1993 parliamentary elections, the party won 2.61% of the popular vote and 5 seats in the National Assembly. In the 1997 parliamentary elections, the party won 1.5% of the popular vote, but no seats in the National Assembly. The majority of Hungarian votes went to the newly formed Alliance of Vojvodina Hungarians, which would remain the major Hungarian political party in Serbia to this day. In the 2000 and 2003 parliamentary elections the party again failed to win any seats in the National Assembly. In the 2008 elections, the party was part of the Hungarian Coalition, which won 4 seats in the Serbian parliament. In the 2012 elections, the party was part of the All Together coalition, which won 1 seat in the Serbian parliament. In the 2014 elections, the party participated on Boris Tadić's coalition list. In the 2016 elections, they formed a coalition with the Hungarian Movement, but it did not participate in the state elections, opting instead only for municipal and provincial elections in Vojvodina.

== Election results ==
=== Parliamentary elections ===
Year	Leader	Popular vote	% of popular vote	Number of seats	Seat change	Coalition	Status
1990	András Ágoston	132,726	2.64%	8 / 250	New		Opposition
1992	András Ágoston	140,825	2.98%	9 / 250	▲1		Opposition
1993	András Ágoston	112,342	2.61%	5 / 250	▼4		Opposition
1997	Sándor Páll	16,812	0.41%	0 / 250	▼5		Non-parliamentary
2000	Sándor Páll	Did not participate		0 / 250	0		Non-parliamentary
2003	Sándor Páll	Did not participate		0 / 250	0		Non-parliamentary
2007	Sándor Páll	12,940	0.32%	0 / 250	0	Hungarian Union	Non-parliamentary
2008	Sándor Páll	74,874	1,81%	0 / 250	0	Hungarian Coalition	Non-parliamentary
2012	Áron Csonka	24,993	0.63%	0 / 250	0	All Together	Non-parliamentary
2014	Áron Csonka	204,767	5.70	0 / 250	0	With NDS–Z–LSV–ZZS	Non-parliamentary
2016	Áron Csonka	Did not participate		0 / 250	0		Non-parliamentary
2020	Áron Csonka	Did not participate		0 / 250	0		Non-parliamentary
2022	Áron Csonka	520,469	14.09%	0 / 250	0	UZPS	Extra-parliamentary
2023	Áron Csonka	902,450	24.32%	0 / 250	0	SPN	Extra-parliamentary
2026	Áron Csonka	Did not participate		0 / 250	0	Supported SL	Extra-parliamentary

=== Provincial elections ===
In the provincial elections in Vojvodina in 2008, the party was part of the Hungarian Coalition, which won 7% of votes in the first election round.

In the provincial elections in Vojvodina in 2012, the party was part of the All Together coalition, which won 0.47% of votes in the first election round and which won no seats in the provincial parliament.

=== Local elections ===
In the local elections in Serbia in 2008, the party was part of the Hungarian Coalition, which won the majority of votes in Kanjiža (50.91%), as well as plurality of votes in Senta (31.87%), Bačka Topola (46.25%), Mali Iđoš (37.18%), and Bečej (29.63%).

In the local elections in Serbia in 2012, the party was part of the All Together coalition, which did not won the plurality of votes in any municipality in Vojvodina.
