= Democratic Party of Vojvodina Hungarians =

Serbian political party

Democratic Party of Vojvodina Hungarians Vajdasági Magyar Demokrata Párt Демократска странка војвођанских Мађара
- Abbreviation: VMDP, DSVM
- Leader: Béla Csorba
- Founder: András Ágoston
- Founded: 22 August 1997 in Srbobran
- Split from: Democratic Fellowship of Vojvodina Hungarians
- Headquarters: Temerin
- Ideology: Hungarian minority interests Vojvodina autonomism
- Colours: Green; Red; White
- National Assembly: 0 / 250
- Assembly of Vojvodina: 0 / 120

Website
- www.vmdp.org

Democratic Party of Vojvodina Hungarians (Hungarian: Vajdasági Magyar Demokrata Párt, VMDP, Serbian: Демократска странка војвођанских Мађара, romanized: Demokratska stranka vojvođanskih Mađara, DSVM) is a political party in Serbia representing the Hungarian minority. It advocates for a "personal autonomy" for Hungarians in Vojvodina. It is led by Béla Csorba.

== Electoral results ==
=== Parliamentary elections ===
Year	Popular vote	% of popular vote	Overall seats won	Seat change	Notes	Government
1997	16,986	0.41%	0 / 250	Steady		opposition
2000			0 / 250	Steady		opposition
2003			0 / 250	Steady		opposition
2007	12,940	0.32%	0 / 250	Steady	Coalition MS	opposition
2008	74,874	1.81%	0 / 250	Steady	Coalition MK	opposition
2012			0 / 250	Steady		opposition
2014			0 / 250	Steady		opposition
2016	56,620	1,50 %	0 / 250	Steady	With VMSZ	gov′t support
2020	supported VMSZ		0 / 250	Steady		gov′t support
2022	supported VMSZ		0 / 250	Steady		gov′t support
2023	supported VMSZ		0 / 250	Steady		gov′t support
2026	supported VMSZ		0 / 250	Steady		TBA

=== Provincial elections ===
Following the provincial elections in Vojvodina in 2004, the party had one member in the regional parliament of Vojvodina, in Novi Sad.

On the provincial elections in Vojvodina in 2008, the party was part of Hungarian Coalition, which won 7% of votes in the first election round.

=== Local elections ===
In the local elections in Serbia in 2008, the party was part of Hungarian Coalition, which won the majority of votes in Kanjiža (50.91%), as well as plurality of votes in Senta (31.87%), Bačka Topola (46.25%), Mali Iđoš (37.18%), and Bečej (29.63%).
