= József Kasza =

Serbian politician

- Јожеф Каса; Jožef Kasa
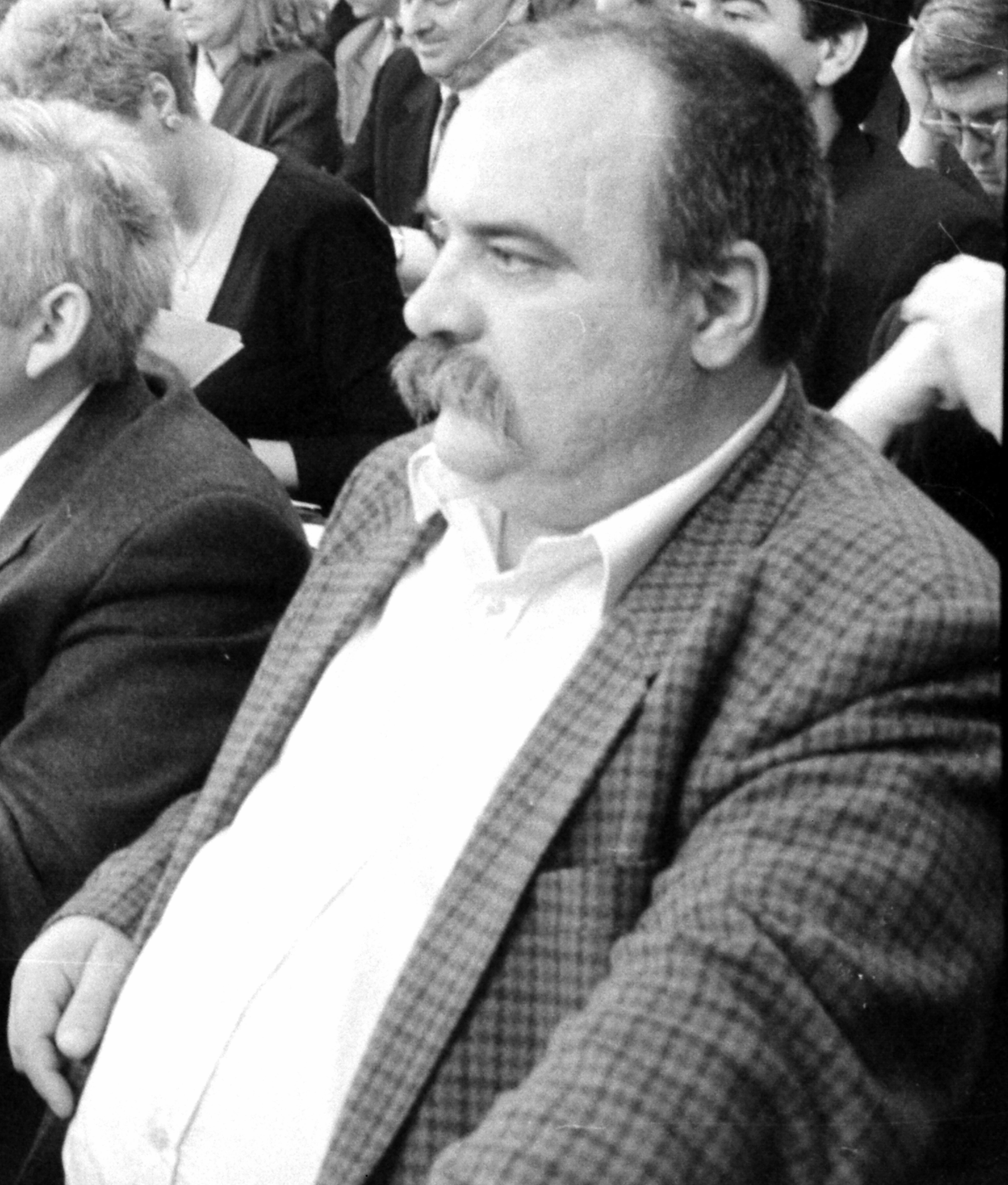
- Kasza c. 1990s

Deputy Prime Minister of Serbia
- In office 25 January 2001 – 3 March 2004
- Prime Minister: Zoran Đinđić; Zoran Živković

Personal details
- Born: 6 February 1945 Subotica, Serbia, DF Yugoslavia
- Died: 3 February 2016 (aged 70) Subotica, Serbia
- Citizenship: Serbian
- Party: Alliance of Vojvodina Hungarians (1995–2010)
- Spouse: Ildikó Árpási
- Children: Kinga; Csongor; Miksa
- Parent(s): Sándor Kasza; Erzsébet Pásztás

József Kasza (Serbian Cyrillic: Јожеф Каса, romanized: Jožef Kasa, 6 February 1945 – 3 February 2016) was a Serbian politician, economist, and banker. An ethnic Hungarian, he led the Alliance of Vojvodina Hungarians from 1995 to 2007.

He was the Deputy Prime Minister of Serbia in the Governments of Zoran Đinđić and Zoran Živković, and the chairman of the Alliance of Vojvodina Hungarians from 1995 to 2007. Kasza was then an honorary president of the party until the title was revoked because of various disagreements on internal issues.

== Personal life ==
His parents were Sándor Kasza and Erzsébet Pásztás. He was married. His wife was Ildikó Árpási. They had three children - a daughter, Kinga and two sons, Csongor and Miksa.
