= Igor Kurjački =

Serbian politician (1968–2020)

Igor Kurjački (Serbian Cyrillic: Игор Курјачки; 1968–2020) was a Serbian politician and former regional agriculture secretary. He was the leader of the Vojvodina's Party and coalition "Vojvodina parties", which participated on 2007 Serbian parliamentary election. Igor Kurjački was previously a member of Social Democratic League of Vojvodina which he had left.
