= Srđan Šajn =

Serbian politician

Member of the National Assembly of the Republic of Serbia

Personal details
- Born: 28 March 1963 (age 63) Samoš, PR Serbia, FPR Yugoslavia
- Party: Roma Party

Srđan Šajn (Serbian Cyrillic: Срђан Шајн, Romani: Srdjan Šajn; born 28 March 1963) is a Serbian politician. He is the leader of one of Romani parties in Serbia, Roma Party. He was first elected to the Serbian Parliament in January 2007, one of only two deputies specifically representing the Romani constituency.
