= Euroroma =

Bulgarian political party representing Romani people

Coordinates: 42°40′7.9″N 23°21′37.8″E

Euroroma (Bulgarian: Евророма) is the biggest political party representing the interests of the Romani people in Bulgaria.

Established on 12 December 1998, Euroroma is not strictly an ethnic party, as it is open to everybody who shares its ideas and goals. In accordance with the stability pact, over 30% of the leadership of the political party are ethnic Bulgarians. Similarly, members of Euroroma's municipal and regional structures are not only Romani people, but also Bulgarians and Turks.

== Main goals of Euroroma ==
- Education for all children from low income families, regardless of their ethnicity.
- Access to medical treatment
- Increased employment opportunities
