= Hungarian Union (Serbia) =

Hungarian Union (Hungarian: Magyar Összefogás Koalíció; Serbian: Коалиција Мађарска слога / Koalicija Mađarska sloga) was a political coalition in the legislative elections in Serbia, on 21 January, 2007. The alliance won 0.32% of the popular vote, and no seats in the parliament. The alliance was formed by the Democratic Fellowship of Vojvodina Hungarians led by Sándor Páll and Democratic Party of Vojvodina Hungarians led by András Ágoston.
