= Riza Halimi =

Serbian politician (born 1947)

- Риза Халими
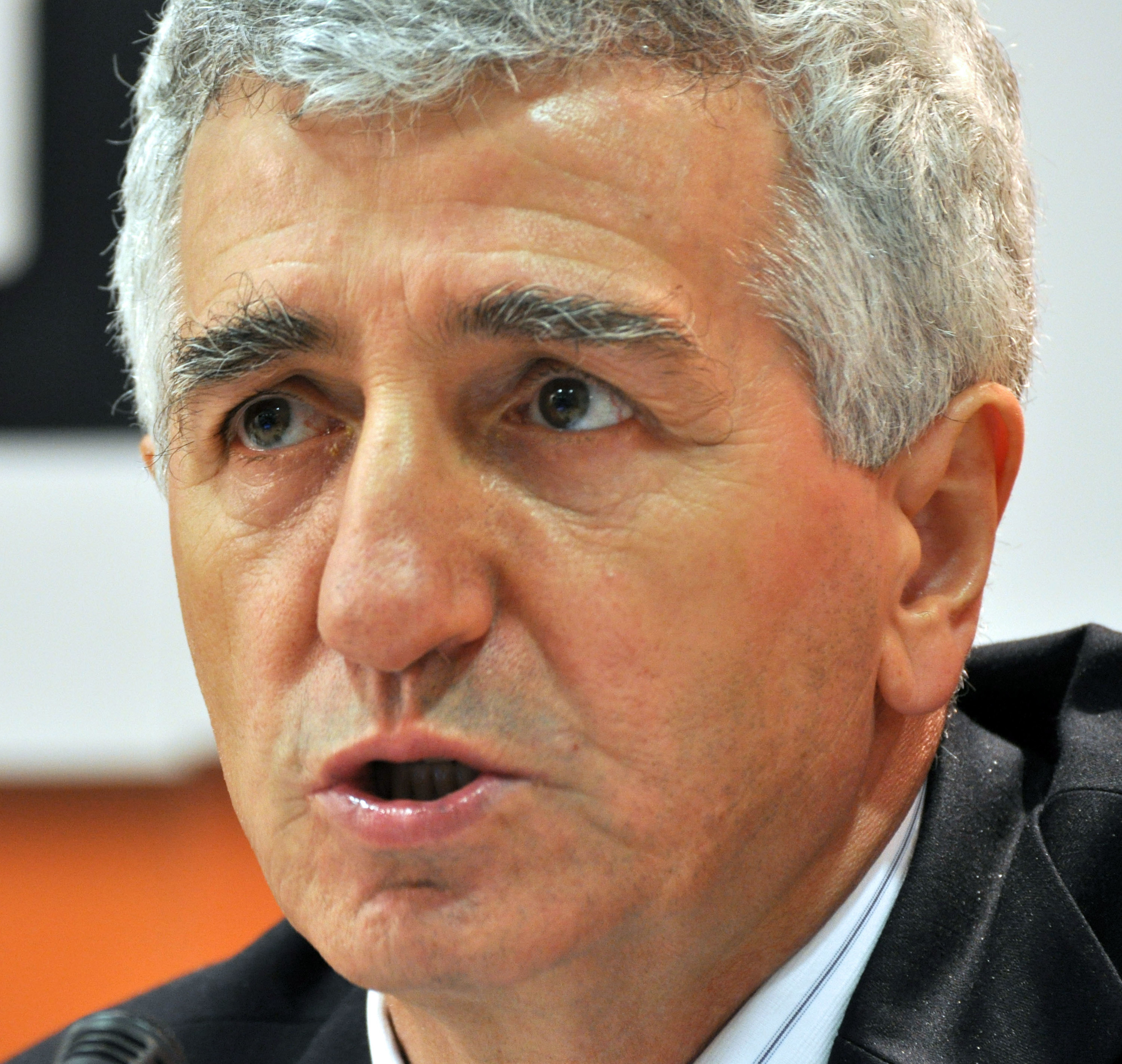

Personal details
- Born: 16 September 1947 (age 79) Preševo, PR Serbia, FPR Yugoslavia
- Party: Party for Democratic Action

Riza Halimi (Serbian Cyrillic: Риза Халими; born 16 September 1947) is a Serbian politician. An ethnic Albanian, he was the president of the Party for Democratic Action from its foundation until 2018, and now serves as the honorary president of the party.

== Life ==
After his education as a physicist, he started teaching physics in high school.

In March 2000, he was sentenced to three months in prison, and to a one-year probation sentence for obstructing a police officer from performance of his duties on at a protest by the citizens of Preševo over the Drenica massacre.

He was elected a member of the National Assembly three times. He was the president of the assembly of the municipality of Preševo. He was the only member of the Coalition of Albanians of the Preševo Valley in the assembly from 2008 and 2012.

In April 2013, he supported the signing of the Brussels Agreement between Serbia and Kosovo.

In the 2014 Serbian parliamentary election, his Party for Democratic Action won two seats in Parliament. His Party for Democratic Action formed a parliamentary club together with the Party of Democratic Action of Sandžak.

In 2018, he stepped down as the president of the party, and now serves as the honorary president.
