= Hungarian Coalition =

Former political coalition in Serbia

The Hungarian Coalition (Hungarian: Magyar Koalíció (MK); Serbian: Мађарска Коалиција (МК), Mađarska Koalicija (MK)) was a political coalition composed of three ethnic Hungarian political parties in Serbia: the Alliance of Vojvodina Hungarians, the Democratic Party of Vojvodina Hungarians, and the Democratic Fellowship of Vojvodina Hungarians. The leader of the Hungarian Coalition was István Pásztor.

== Political goals ==
The Hungarian Coalition advocates the creation of an autonomous multiethnic region in northern Serbia (see: Hungarian Regional Autonomy), which would include municipalities with a Hungarian ethnic majority (Kanjiža, Senta, Ada, Bačka Topola, Mali Iđoš, Čoka), as well as ethnically mixed municipalities of Subotica and Bečej and municipality of Novi Kneževac, in which the majority of population are Serbs. The center of this autonomous region would be Subotica.

== Participation in elections ==
=== State elections ===
In 2008 Serbian parliamentary election, the Hungarian Coalition won 4 seats in the Serbian parliament. On April 25, 2008 the Hungarian Coalition got the support of Croat party Democratic Union of Croats for these elections.

=== Provincial elections ===
On the provincial elections in Vojvodina in 2008, the Hungarian Coalition won 7% of votes in the first election round.

=== Local elections ===
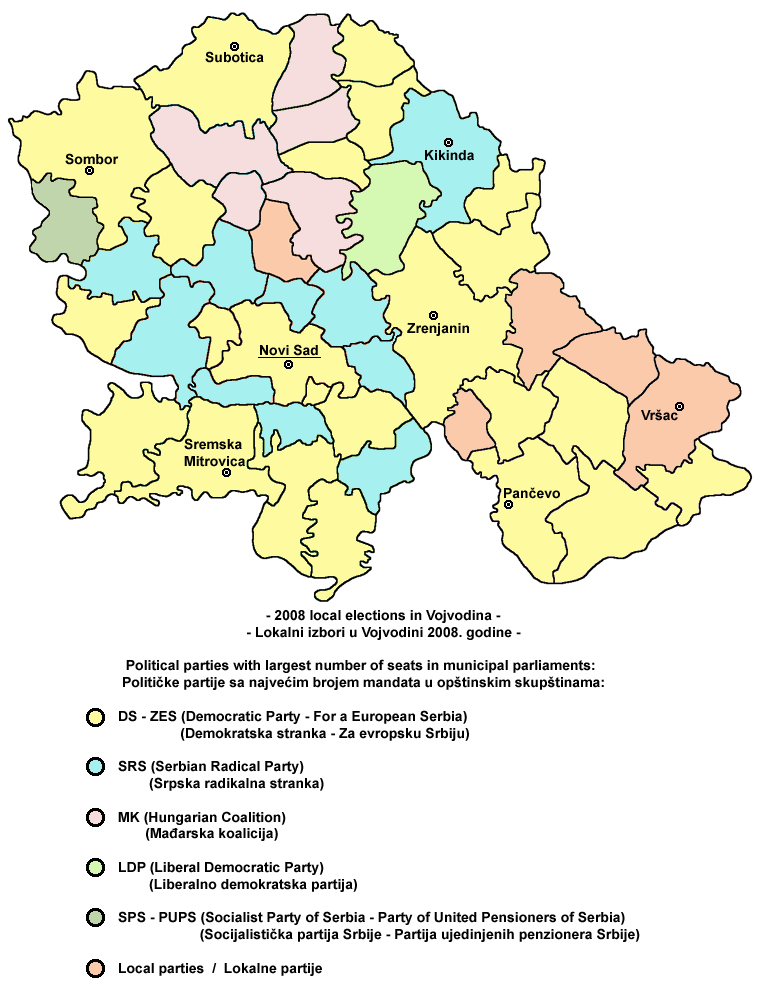
Results of 2008 local elections in Vojvodina

In 2008 local elections in Serbia, the expectations of the Hungarian Coalition were to win majority of votes in the local parliaments of municipalities of Serbia with ethnic Hungarian majority, but this was the case only in municipality of Kanjiža, where Hungarian Coalition won 50.91% of votes. The Coalition also won the plurality of votes in municipalities of Senta (31.87%), Bačka Topola (46.25%), and Mali Iđoš (37.18%), while in municipalities of Čoka and Ada, the Hungarian Coalition was second largest political option, after Democratic Party (In Čoka, Democratic Party won 29.08% of votes and Hungarian Coalition won 24.47% of votes; in Ada, the coalition led by Democratic Party won 29.25% of votes and Hungarian Coalition won 25.70% of votes). In the ethnically mixed municipality of Subotica, the Hungarian Coalition was also second largest political option after coalition led by Democratic Party (Democratic Party coalition won 40.16% of votes and Hungarian Coalition won 27.14% of votes in Subotica), while in the ethnically mixed municipality of Bečej, the Hungarian Coalition won the plurality of votes (29.63%). In the municipality of Novi Kneževac with an ethnic Serb majority (claimed by Hungarian Coalition as part of future autonomous region), the Hungarian Coalition was third largest political option with 17.63% of votes (Largest political option in Novi Kneževac municipality was coalition led by Democratic Party with 27.18% of votes, and the second largest was Serbian Radical Party with 22.46% of the votes).
