= István Pásztor (politician) =

Serbian politician (1956–2023)

- Иштван Пастор
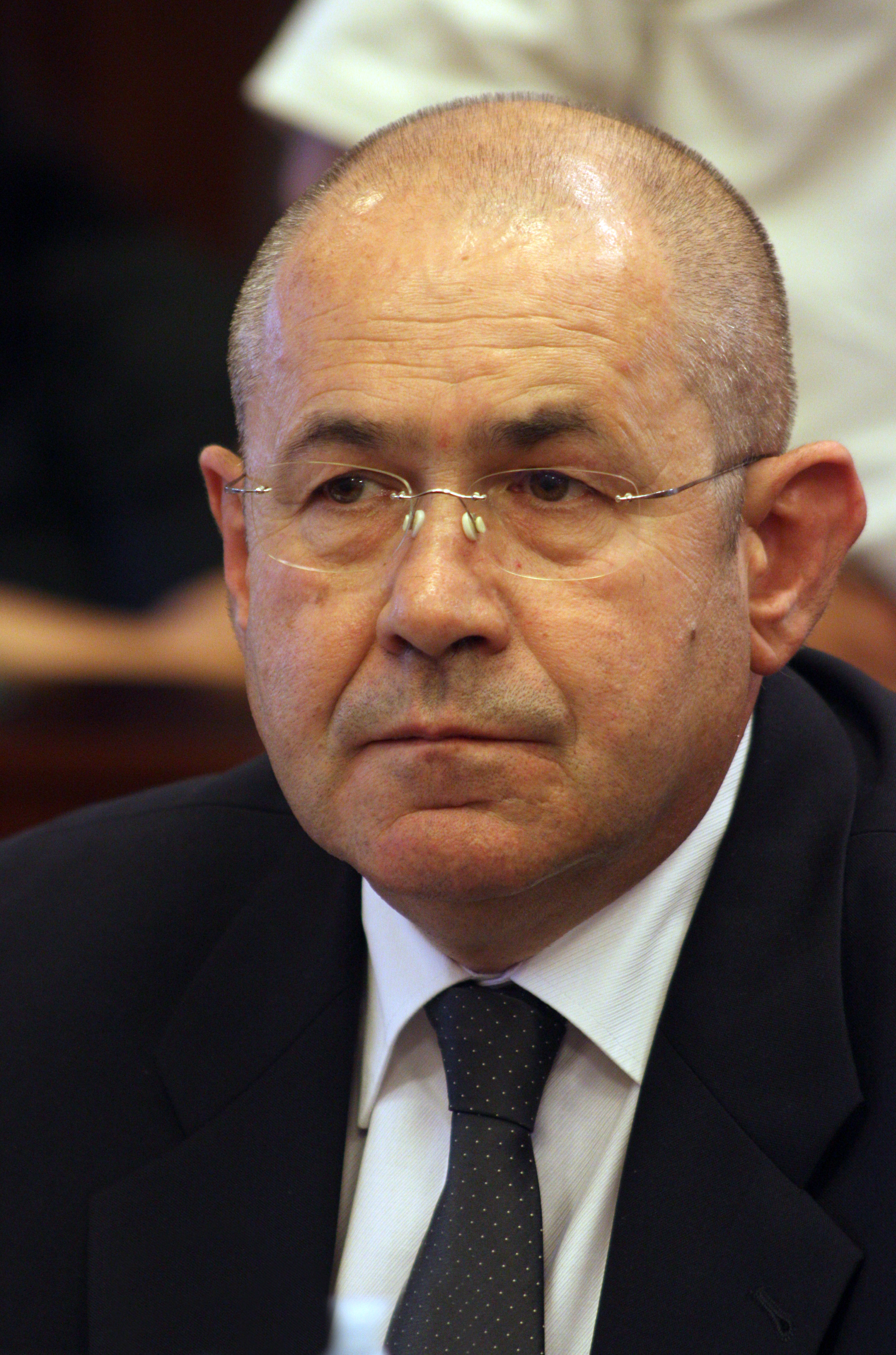
- Pásztor in 2012

President of the Assembly of Vojvodina
- In office 22 June 2012 – 30 October 2023
- Preceded by: Sándor Egeresi
- Succeeded by: Momo Čolaković

Vice-President of the Government of Vojvodina in charge of Economy
- In office 2008–2012

Provincial Secretary of Privatisation, Entrepreneurship and Small and Medium-sized Enterprises
- In office 2000–2008

Personal details
- Born: 20 August 1956 Novi Kneževac, SAP Vojvodina, PR Serbia, FPR Yugoslavia
- Died: 30 October 2023 (aged 67) Novi Sad, Serbia
- Citizenship: Serbian
- Party: Alliance of Vojvodina Hungarians
- Children: Bálint Pásztor
- Education: University of Novi Sad
- Occupation: Politician
- Awards: Commander's Cross of the Hungarian Order of Merit with Star

István Pásztor (Note: Hungarian pronunciation: [ˈiʃtvaːn ˈpaːstor]; Serbian: Иштван Пастор, Ištvan Pastor) (20 August 1956 – 30 October 2023) was a Serbian politician who served as the president of the Assembly of Vojvodina from 2012 until his death in 2023. An ethnic Hungarian, he led the Alliance of Vojvodina Hungarians from 2008 to 2023.

== Biography ==
István Pásztor was born in Novi Kneževac, SAP Vojvodina on 20 August 1956. He graduated from the University of Novi Sad Faculty of Law. In his later years, Pásztor was the chairman of the Alliance of Vojvodina Hungarians and president of the Assembly of Vojvodina. He was once a leader of the Hungarian Coalition, which also included two other ethnic Hungarian political parties in Serbia.

Pásztor was the candidate of the Hungarian Coalition in the 2008 Serbian presidential election. He won 2.26% of the vote in the first round, and supported Boris Tadić in the second round.

Pásztor died on 30 October 2023, at the age of 67. His death received condolences from politicians in Serbia and Hungary, and his funeral on November 4 was attended by President of Serbia Aleksandar Vučić, President of Republika Srpska Milorad Dodik and Prime Minister of Hungary Viktor Orbán.
