= Alliance of Vojvodina Hungarians =

Political party in Serbia

Alliance of Vojvodina Hungarians Vajdasági Magyar Szövetség Савез војвођанских Мађара
- Abbreviation: VMSZ, SVM
- President: Bálint Pásztor
- Vice-Presidents: Borisz Bájity; József Kerekes; Annamária Vicsek
- Parliamentary leader: Bálint Pásztor
- Founder: József Kasza
- Founded: 18 June 1994; 32 years ago
- Split from: Democratic Fellowship of Vojvodina Hungarians
- Headquarters: Trg žrtava fašizma 9, Subotica
- Membership (2015): 12,000
- Ideology: Hungarian minority interests; Regionalism; Conservatism
- Political position: Centre-right
- European affiliation: European People's Party (associate)
- International affiliation: Centrist Democrat International
- Parliamentary group: Alliance of Vojvodina Hungarians
- Colours: Green
- National Assembly: 2 / 250
- Assembly of Vojvodina: 9 / 120
- City Assembly of Belgrade: 1 / 110

Party flag

Website
- vmsz.org.rs

The Alliance of Vojvodina Hungarians (Hungarian: Vajdasági Magyar Szövetség, abbr. VMSZ; Serbian: Савез војвођанских Мађара, romanized: Savez vojvođanskih Mađara, abbr. SVM) is a regionalist political party in Serbia, representing the Hungarian ethnic minority.

== History ==
=== Foundation and early history ===
The party was founded in 1994 in Senta by József Kasza and former members of the Democratic Fellowship of Vojvodina Hungarians as a citizen group which in 1995 was registered as a political party. They participated in the 1997 parliamentary election in which they won 1.23% of the vote and 4 seats in the National Assembly. In early 2000, it was one of the founding members of the Democratic Opposition of Serbia (DOS) which ousted the president Slobodan Milošević later that year. In the 2000 parliamentary election they participated under the DOS coalition and the party won 6 seats in the parliament.

=== Post-Milošević era and leadership change ===
From the early 2000s, they started promoting an idea to form a Hungarian Regional Autonomy in the northern part of Vojvodina. In the 2003 parliamentary election they ended up not passing the electoral threshold with 4.23% of the vote. In 2007 they participated alone and they won 1.3% of the vote and 3 seats in the parliament. They also participated in the 2004 provincial election in Vojvodina and the party won 8.50% of vote in the one-round voting system and was part of the ruling coalition in the Vojvodina provincial parliament. In the 2004 local elections, the party won the largest number of seats in the municipal parliaments of Subotica, Senta, Bačka Topola, Mali Iđoš, Kanjiža (where Reformists of Vojvodina won same number of seats) and Čoka. In 2008, the party elected István Pásztor as their new president while József Kasza remained as the honorary president until 2010, when his membership was revoked. In 2008, they participated in the provincial election in Vojvodina, local elections and parliamentary election and they were a part of the Hungarian Coalition which won 7% of the vote in the provincial election and 1.81% and 4 seats in the parliamentary election, while in Kanjiža they won 50.91%, in Senta 31.87%, Bačka Topola 46.25%, Mali Iđoš 37.18%, and Bečej 29.63%. Since the introduction of the multi-party system in Serbia, the mayor of Subotica was often from the Alliance of Vojvodina Hungarians. That has changed after local elections 2008, when Democratic Party won the largest number of votes in this city.

=== Modern period ===
In 2012, they participated in the parliamentary election, local elections, provincial election and presidential election. In the parliamentary election, they won 1.75% of the vote and 5 seats in the National Assembly, in Novi Sad they won one seat while in Subotica they won 22.52% of the vote, in the provincial election they won 5.83% of the vote and 7 seats, and in the presidential election, in the first round, Pásztor won 1.62% of the vote in the first round while in the second round he supported Boris Tadić. Since the 2014 parliamentary election, they have been supporting the ruling SNS-led coalition. In 2014 they won 2.1% of the vote and 6 seats in the parliament, in 2016 they won 1.5% of the vote and lost two seats and then in 2020 they won 2.23% of the vote and got 5 more seats in the parliament.

Bálint Pásztor was elected as leader of the VMSZ at a party convention in Senta on 2 March 2024. The only candidate for the position, he received the support of 333 out of 335 delegates in attendance. In the 2026 parliamentary election, the party ran on its own list, led by Pásztor, which won 35,461 votes (0.81%) and two seats, four fewer than in 2023.

== Political positions ==
Besides being supportive of Hungarian minority interests, the Alliance of Vojvodina Hungarians also maintains a conservative ideology, and is also supportive of regionalism. Its foreign policies are considered to be pro-Western, and it supports Serbia's accession to the European Union and NATO. It was considered a social-democratic party until 2010, when it shifted their support towards the Serbian Progressive Party and Fidesz.

It is positioned on the centre-right on the political spectrum. It is also an associate member of the European People's Party.

In the Parliamentary Assembly of the Council of Europe, VMSZ has been associated with the European People's Party since 2007.

== Electoral performance ==
=== Parliamentary elections ===
National Assembly of Serbia
Year	Leader	Popular vote	% of popular vote	#	# of seats	Seat change	Coalition	Status
1997	József Kasza	50,960	1.28%	▲7th	4 / 250	▲4	–	Opposition
2000	József Kasza	2,404,758	65.69%	▲1st	6 / 250	▲2	DOS	Government
2003	József Kasza	161,765	4.29%	▼7th	0 / 250	▼6	ZZT	Extra-parliamentary
2007	József Kasza	52,510	1.32%	▼10th	3 / 250	▲3	–	Opposition
2008	István Pásztor	74,874	1.85%	▲6th	4 / 250	▲1	MK	Support
2012	István Pásztor	68,323	1.83%	▼9th	5 / 250	▲1	–	Opposition
2014	István Pásztor	75,294	2.17%	9th	6 / 250	▲1	–	Support
2016	István Pásztor	56,620	1.54%	▲8th	4 / 250	▼2	VMSZ–VMDP	Support
2020	István Pásztor	71,893	2.32%	▲7th	9 / 250	▲5	–	Support
2022	István Pásztor	60,313	1.63%	▼11th	5 / 250	▼4	–	Support
2023	Bálint Pásztor	64,747	1.74%	▲7th	6 / 250	▲1	–	Support
2026	Bálint Pásztor	35,461	0.81%	▲5th	2 / 250	▼4	–	TBA

=== Presidential elections ===
President of Serbia
Year	Candidate	1st round popular vote		% of popular vote	2nd round popular vote		% of popular vote	Notes
Sep 1997	did not participate							Election annulled due to low turnout
Dec 1997	did not participate							
Sep–Oct 2002	did not participate							Election annulled due to low turnout
Dec 2002	did not participate							Election annulled due to low turnout
2003	did not participate							Election annulled due to low turnout
2004	did not participate							
2008	István Pásztor	6th	93,039	2.30%	—N/a	—	—	
2012	István Pásztor	9th	63,420	1.70%	—N/a	—	—	
2017	Aleksandar Vučić	1st	2,012,788	56.01%	—N/a	—	—	Supported Vučić
2022	Aleksandar Vučić	1st	2,224,914	60.01%	—N/a	—	—	Supported Vučić

=== Provincial elections ===
Assembly of Vojvodina
Year	Leader	Popular vote	% of popular vote	#	# of seats	Seat change	Coalition	Status
1996	József Kasza	–	–	▲3rd	13 / 120	▲13	–	Support
2000	József Kasza	–	–	▲2nd	14 / 120	▲1	–	Government
2004	József Kasza	54,380	8.80%	▼4th	11 / 120	▼3	–	Government
2008	István Pásztor	77,390	7.60%	4th	9 / 120	▼2	MK	Government
2012	István Pásztor	62,275	6.47%	▼6th	7 / 120	▼2	–	Government
2016	István Pásztor	47,034	5.03%	▼7th	6 / 120	▼1	–	Government
2020	István Pásztor	75,218	9.29%	▲3rd	11 / 120	▲5	–	Government
2023	Bálint Pásztor	63,721	6.68%	3rd	9 / 120	▼2	–	Government

== Positions held ==
Major positions held by Alliance of Vojvodina Hungarians members:

President of the Assembly of Vojvodina	Years
Sándor Egeresi	2008–2012
István Pásztor	2012–2023

== See also ==
- Hungarians in Serbia
