= Ethnic party =

Party formed to represent an ethnic group

An ethnic party is a political party that overtly presents itself as the champion of one ethnic group or sets of ethnic groups. Ethnic parties make such representation central to their voter mobilization strategy. An alternate designation is 'Political parties of minorities', but they should not be confused with regionalist or separatist parties, whose purpose is territorial autonomy or independence.

== Definitions ==
There are varied definitions of both ethnicity and ethnic parties.

=== Ethnicity ===
Kanchan Chandra defines ethnic identity narrowly as a subset of identity categories determined by the belief of common descent. She rejects expansive definitions of ethnic identity (such as those that include common culture, common language, common history and common territory). Jóhanna Birnir defines ethnicity as "group self-identification around a characteristic that is very difficult or even impossible to change, such as language, race, or location."

=== Ethnic party ===
According to Donna Lee Van Cott,

Ethnic party is defined here as an organization authorized to compete in local or national elections; the majority of its leadership and membership identify themselves as belonging to a nondominant ethnic group, and its electoral platform includes demands and programs of an ethnic or cultural nature.

According to Kanchan Chandra,

An ethnic party is a party that overtly represents itself as a champion of the cause of one particular ethnic category or set of categories to the exclusion of others, and that makes such a representation central to its strategy of mobilizing voters.

== Historical ethnic parties ==
The oldest prototypes of ethnic parties are the Jewish parties of the Russian and Austro-Hungarian empires, e.g. Bund, Folkspartei, World Agudath Israel, and the Swedish party in Finland, Svenska Folkpartiet (SFP), all of them founded in the end of the 19th century or in the first decade of the 20th.

== Ethnic parties and political ideologies ==
Ethnic parties may take different ideological positions.

For instance, the parties competing for Jewish votes in interwar Poland and Lithuania had a range of different political views. There were Zionist parties (themselves divided into Revisionist, General, Religious or Labour parties), there was Agudat Israel (an Orthodox religious party), the Bund (Marxist) and the Folkspartei (liberal).

In some political systems, party politics are mostly dominated by ethnicity, as in Bosnia-Herzegovina and its federal regions, in Israel, in Suriname, in Malaysia, or in Guyana. In Fiji, 46 seats out of 71 are elected from ethnically-closed Communal constituencies, as there was in the pre-Israel Palestine Jewish Assembly, the Asefat ha-Nivharim with separate 'curiae' for Ashkenaz, Sepharad and Oriental, and Yemeni Jews. In Malaysia, parties of different ethnic groups (Malay, Chinese, and Indian) which made up the demographics of the country, formed a coalition known as the Alliance Party in 1952. Along with its successor the Barisan Nasional (from 1974), the coalition ruled the country from 1955 to 2018.

As a consequence, it would be somewhat irrelevant to classify some parties in these systems as 'ideological' (social-democrat, liberal, christian democratic etc.) and some others as 'purely autonomist', 'purely ethnic' or 'purely minority' parties.

Particularly large minorities may develop a party system unto themselves; in interwar Czechoslovakia, the large Sudeten German minority had its own system of parties corresponding to the main political trends; the German Social Democratic Workers' Party, the Farmers' League and the Sudeten German Party representing the centre-left, centre-right, and far-right, respectively. Likewise, the Democratic Union for Integration and VLEN Coalition compete to represent Albanians in North Macedonia, and the various parties which compete for the votes of Arab citizens of Israel.

The Swedish People's Party of Finland (SFP) is a full-fledged member of the Liberal International, as well as the Movement for Rights and Freedoms, representing the Turkish minority in Bulgaria, the South Tyrol People's Party (SVP, grouping German- and Ladin-speaking inhabitants of Italy's South Tyrol province) is a member of the Christian Democratic European People's Party, whereas the Social Democratic and Labour Party (SDLP), an Irish Catholic party in Northern Ireland is a member of the Socialist International, etc.

Hungarians have ethnic parties in Slovakia (Hungarian Alliance), in Serbia (Alliance of Vojvodina Hungarians) and in Romania (Democratic Union of Hungarians in Romania).

In interwar Poland, Jewish, German and Ukrainian parties never attracted all Polish Jews, Germans and Ukrainians of whom some were members of 'national' ideological Polish parties, mostly the Socialist and Communist parties, who were considered more open-minded than the conservative or nationalist parties.

== Ethnic parties and elections ==
Common lists or electoral agreements can be organized either between ethnic parties (Flemish parties 'Kartel's for municipal elections in Brussels or Union des Francophones in Flemish Brabant, the coalition for the 2001 parliamentary elections in Bulgaria between the - mostly Turkish - Movement for Rights and Freedoms and the Roma party Euroroma) or between two parties having common ideological options beyond ethnic differences, as the Bund and the 'Polish' socialist party PPS for the municipal elections in 1939.

Some ethnic parties only take part in substatal electoral competition, thus making them somewhat invisible to outside observers: the South Schleswig Voter Federation in the German state of Schleswig-Holstein, the German parties in Denmark (Schleswig Party) and Poland (German Minority in Silesia), the Silesian Autonomy Movement in Poland, the Romani parties in Slovakia (Roma Civic Initiative).

It can occur that a single 'supra-ideological' party seeks, with varying degrees of success, to represent the whole of the ethnic group, as for the Swedish People's Party in Finland, the South Schleswig Voter Federation for Danes and Frisians in the German state of Schleswig-Holstein, the Unity for Human Rights Party for Greeks in Albania, the Slovene Union for Slovenes in north-eastern Italy, the Movement for Rights and Freedoms for Turks in Bulgaria, the Democratic Union of Hungarians in Romania. Alternatively, a separate system of left- and right-leaning ethnic parties may arise alongside the mainstream parties, as with the Democratic Union for Integration and the VLEN Coalition, which compete for the votes of Albanians in North Macedonia.

In most cases, ethnic parties compete inside electoral systems where voters aren't compelled to vote according to ethnic affiliations and may vote too for 'non-ethnic', 'transethnic' or 'supraethnic' ideological parties, in contrast to a political arrangement where parties' support bases are primarily found among specific ethnic or religious groups. In most Near Eastern Arab countries, the only such parties were the Communists, whose founders and subsequent leaders came mostly from ethnic/religious minorities (Arab Christians, Jews, Kurds, Armenians and others). The socialist movement in Thessaloniki (present Northern Greece) during the last decade of the Ottoman Empire was divided across ethnic lines between the Sephardi Jews (who formed the majority of the population), the Bulgarian and Macedonian Slavs and the Greeks, but all groups united when it came to election time.

A 2024 study found that when ethnic groups in Africa have an elected local ethnic party politician in parliament, they subsequently are more likely be employed.

=== Ethnic parties and electoral rules ===
Some countries have special electoral rules for ethnic parties. Some countries create reserved seats in their legislatures for ethnic minorities. In such a case, ethnic parties may primarily or solely compete to win these seats. Examples of this include the Independent Democratic Serb Party which competes for the Sabor's Serb reserved seats and the Maori Party, competing primarily in the Māori electorates. In Serbia, ethnic parties do not need to meet the electoral threshold vote of 3% to hold seats in parliament; they get the percentage in parliament equal to their percentage of vote share.

== 'Intraethnic parties', or political parties inside diasporic communities ==
There is also a specifically diasporic type of political parties that could be labelled as 'intraethnic parties', i.e. parties that compete only inside the diasporic political sphere.

The Jewish and Armenian (Dashnak, Ramgavar, or Hentchak) parties belong to this category, as well as the international sections of national parties, such as the (U.S.) Republicans Abroad and Democrats Abroad, the (French) Parti socialiste's Fédération des Français de l'étranger or the American and European branches of the Israeli Likud and of the Kuomintang (Nationalist Party of China).

There can also be specific political groupings representing members of a national community living abroad, such as the Association démocratique des Français de l'étranger - Français du Monde (left-wing) and the Union des Français de l'Étranger (right-wing), both competing for seats in the Assemblée des Français de l'étranger (fr), or the various political lists competing for the Comitati degli italiani all'estero (COMITES).

== See also ==
- Ethnic nationalism
- Diaspora politics
- Ethnocracy
- Votebank
