= Dimitrije Jovanović =

Serbian politician

Dimitrije Jovanović (Serbian Cyrillic: Димитрије Јовановић; born 28 August 1954) is a politician in Serbia. He was a member of the National Assembly of Serbia from 2001 to 2004, serving with the Democratic Party (Demokratska stranka, DS). He later joined the Serbian Progressive Party (Srpska napredna stranka, SNS) and became a member of the municipal council in his home community of Aranđelovac.

== Private career ==
Jovanović is a graduated pharmacist. His grandfather, Dimitrije K. Jovanović, was a senator in the Kingdom of Yugoslavia from 1939 to 1941.

== Politician ==
The DS participated in a multi-party coalition called the Democratic Opposition of Serbia (Demokratska opozicija Srbije, DOS) for the 2000 Serbian parliamentary election, and Jovanović appeared in the 206th position on the DOS's electoral list. The list won a landslide majority victory with 176 out of 250 mandates. He was not initially included in his party's assembly delegation but was given a mandate on 17 December 2001 as the replacement for another DS member. (From 2000 to 2011, mandates in Serbian parliamentary elections were awarded to successful parties or coalitions rather than individual candidates, and it was common practice for the mandates to be assigned out of numerical order. Jovanović's list position had no formal bearing on whether or when he received a mandate.) In parliament, he served as a member of the committee on Kosovo and Metohija.

The DOS alliance ended in late 2003, and the DS contested the 2003 parliamentary election on its own. Jovanović was given the seventy-third position on the party's list. The list won thirty-seven seats, and he was not chosen for a new parliamentary mandate. His term came to an end in January 2004.

Serbia introduced the direct election of mayors in the 2004 Serbian local elections. Jovanović ran for mayor of Aranđelovac with a combined endorsement from the DS and the Serbian Renewal Movement (Srpski pokret obnove, SPO). He was defeated in the second round by a candidate of the far-right Serbian Radical Party (Srpska Radikalna Stranka, SRS). He served as president of the local DS board after the vote; in 2006, he called for new elections against the backdrop of a dysfunctional local administration.

Jovanović later left the DS and joined the Progressive Party. He appeared in the fifteenth position on the party's list for the Aranđelovac municipal assembly in the 2014 local elections and was elected when the list won a majority victory with twenty-seven of forty-one mandates. He was appointed to the municipal council (i.e., the executive branch of the municipal government) following the election, with responsibility for development of economy and entrepreneurship. Jovanović appeared in the sixteenth position on the party's list in the 2018 local elections, was re-elected when the list won a majority victory, and was re-appointed to council in the same portfolio as before.

He is not a candidate in the 2022 local elections.

== Electoral record ==
=== Local (Aranđelovac) ===
2004 Municipality of Aranđelovac local election Mayor of Aranđelovac - Second Round Results
Candidate	Party or Coalition	Votes	%
Radosav Švabić	Serbian Radical Party	6,272	54.21
Dimitrije Jovanović Mita	Democratic Party–Serbian Renewal Movement	5,297	45.79
Total valid votes		11,569	100
