= Lazar Čavić =

Serbian politician (born 1973)

Lazar Čavić (Serbian Cyrillic: Лазар Чавић; born 14 April 1973) is a Serbian politician. He has served in the National Assembly of Serbia and the Assembly of Vojvodina as a member of the far-right Serbian Radical Party (SRS).

== Early life and private career ==
Čavić was born in the village of Subotište in the municipality of Pećinci, in what was then the Socialist Autonomous Province of Vojvodina in the Socialist Republic of Serbia, Socialist Federal Republic of Yugoslavia. He was raised in the municipality and ultimately worked in agriculture at his family's farm in the village of Donji Tovarnik.

== Politician ==
Čavić became president of the Radical Party's committee in Donji Tovarnik in 1994. He ran for Pećinci's seventh division in the 2000 Serbian local elections and, like all Radical Party candidates in the municipality for this cycle, was defeated.

=== Parliamentarian ===
Čavić appeared in the 101st position on the Radical Party's electoral list in the 2003 Serbian parliamentary election. The party won eighty-two seats; he was not initially included in the SRS assembly delegation but received a mandate on 17 February 2004 as the replacement for another member. (From 2000 to 2011, Serbian parliamentary mandates were awarded to sponsoring parties or coalitions rather than to individual candidates, and it was common practice for the mandates to be assigned out of numerical order. Čavić's position on the list had no bearing on whether or when he received a mandate.)

Although Radicals won more seats than any other party in the 2003 election, they fell well short of a majority and ultimately served in opposition. Čavić was a member of the committee for Kosovo and Metohija. He was not a candidate for re-election in 2007.

Serbia introduced the direct election of mayors in the 2004 local elections. Čavić ran for mayor of Pećinci and was defeated in the second round by Democratic Party (DS) candidate Nikola Pavković. He also appeared in the lead position on the SRS's list for the municipal assembly and was elected when the list won eight mandates. He served in opposition at this level as well.

=== Member of the provincial assembly ===
Čavić appeared in the tenth position on the Radical Party's electoral list in the 2008 Vojvodina provincial election and was given a mandate when the list won twenty seats. The Democratic Party and its allies won a majority government, and the Radicals again served in opposition.

The Radical Party experienced a serious split in late 2008, with several members joining the more moderate Serbian Progressive Party (SNS) under the leadership of Tomislav Nikolić and Aleksandar Vučić. Čavić remained with the Radicals.

Serbia's electoral system was reformed in 2011, such that all mandates were awarded to candidates on successful lists in numerical order. Čavić appeared in the seventh position on the SRS list in the 2012 provincial election and was not immediately re-elected when the list won five seats. He received a seat on 15 May 2014 as the replacement for another delegate and served on the committee for petitions and proposals. The Radicals remained in opposition during this time.

He appeared in the twenty-fifth position on the SRS list in the 2016 provincial election and was not re-elected when the list won ten mandates.

Čavić also appeared on the Radical Party's electoral list in the 2012 and 2014 Serbian parliamentary elections and led the party's list in Pećinci in the 2012, 2014, and 2017 Serbian local elections. In each case, the party fell below the electoral threshold for representation in the relevant assembly.

== Electoral record ==
=== Local (Pećinci) ===
2004 Municipality of Pećinci local election: Mayor of Pećinci
Candidate	Party	First round		Second round	
Candidate	Party	Votes	%	Votes	%
Nikola Pavković (incumbent)	Democratic Party			2,865	55.58
Lazar Čavić	Serbian Radical Party			2,290	44.42
other candidates					
Total				5,155	100.00
