= Milan Švabić =

Serbian politician (born 1951)

Milan Švabić (Serbian Cyrillic: Милан Швабић; born 1951) is a Serbian politician, administrator, and entrepreneur. He is a former mayor of Aranđelovac and has served in the assemblies of Serbia and Yugoslavia. Švabić is now a member of the Aranđelovac municipal assembly, serving as an independent delegate aligned with Dveri.

== Early life and career ==
Švabić was born in the village of Vrbica near Aranđelovac, in what was then the People's Republic of Serbia in the Federal People's Republic of Yugoslavia. He was raised in his home community and graduated from the University of Belgrade Faculty of Economics in 1976. Švabić worked for a local branch of Jugobanka until 1982, when he began working for the company Šamot.

== Politician ==
=== Mayor and parliamentarian (1989–1993) ===
Švabić was elected as mayor of Aranđelovac in the 1989 Serbian local elections. He was later elected to the National Assembly of Serbia for Aranđelovac in the 1990 Serbian parliamentary election as a candidate of the Socialist Party of Serbia (SPS). The SPS won a majority victory in 1990, and he initially served as a supporter of the administration. In March 1991, he was chosen as one of the Serbian parliament's twelve delegates to the Chamber of Republics in the assembly of the Socialist Federal Republic of Yugoslavia (SFRY). He stood down as mayor in December 1991, citing his other responsibilities. His term in the SFRY parliament ended in April 1992, when the country ceased to exist.

Švabić was one of four parliamentarians who left the SPS assembly group on 1 July 1992, dissatisfied with the party's policies. He later helped to form a breakaway group called the Social Democratic Party.

The 1990 Serbian parliamentary election was the last to be conducted in single-member constituency seats; all subsequent elections have been held under proportional representation. Švabić was not a candidate in the 1992 Serbian parliamentary election and his term ended when the new assembly convened in early 1993.

Švabić appeared in the second position on the electoral list of Vuk Obradović's Social Democracy (SD) party for the Kragujevac division in the 1997 parliamentary election. The list did not win any seats.

=== Out of politics ===
The SPS dominated Serbian politics until the fall of Slobodan Milošević in October 2000. During this period, after leaving office, Švabić worked in education and operated a private business at his family's farm. He became director of the company Venčac in 2001 and later worked in a leadership role at ED Aranđelovac.

=== Local politics in Aranđelovac (2014–present) ===
Švabić appeared in the seventh position on the electoral list of the Serbian Progressive Party (SNS) in Aranđelovac for the 2014 local elections and was elected when the list won a majority victory with twenty-seven out of forty-one seats. He served for the term that followed and was not a candidate for re-election in 2018.

He later joined the party Healthy Serbia (ZS). In the 2022 local elections, he appeared in the lead position on a coalition ZS–Dveri list in Aranđelovac and was elected when the list won three seats. The SNS won the election, and Švabić served in opposition.

Healthy Serbia joined the SNS's political coalition in late 2023. In November 2023, Švabić resigned from the party and said that he would work with Dveri in the local assembly as an independent member.

== Electoral record ==
=== National Assembly of Serbia ===
1990 Serbian parliamentary election: Aranđelovac
Candidate	Party
Radovan Anić	People's Radical Party
Dragan Đurović	Republican Party
Milan Živković	Movement for the Protection of Human Rights in Yugoslavia
Dr. Vlastimir Mirić	Democratic Party
Petar Stanković	Serbian Renewal Movement
Dragan Todorović	Serbian National Renewal–Citizens' Group
Života Švabić	Party of the Union of Peasants of Serbia
Milan Švabić (***WINNER***)	Socialist Party of Serbia
Total
