= Milan Ćuk =

Serbian politician

Milan Ćuk (Serbian Cyrillic: Милан Ћук; born 21 October 1956) is a politician in Serbia. He has been at different times a member of the National Assembly of Serbia, the Assembly of Serbia and Montenegro, and the Assembly of Vojvodina, as well as serving as the mayor of Odžaci. Ćuk is a member of the far-right Serbian Radical Party (Srpska radikalna stranka, SRS).

== Early life and private career ==
Ćuk was born in Odžaci, Autonomous Province of Vojvodina, in what was then the People's Republic of Serbia in the Federal People's Republic of Yugoslavia. He lives in the village of Bački Gračac and is a private entrepreneur.

== Politician ==
Ćuk became politically active in 1992. He appeared in the seventeenth position on the Radical Party's electoral list for Novi Sad in the 1993 Serbian parliamentary election; the list won seven mandates, and he was not included in the party's assembly delegation. (From 1992 to 2000, Serbia's electoral law stipulated that one-third of parliamentary mandates would be assigned to candidates from successful lists in numerical order, while the remaining two-thirds would be distributed amongst other candidates on the lists at the discretion of the sponsoring parties. It was common practice for the latter mandates to be awarded out of order. Ćuk could have been awarded a mandate despite his list position, although he was not.)

=== Parliamentarian ===
Ćuk appeared in the sixth and final position on the SRS's list for the redistributed Sombor division in the 1997 Serbian parliamentary election. The list won three mandates, and he was not initially given a mandate. The Radical Party joined a coalition government led by the Socialist Party of Serbia (Socijalistička partija Srbije, SPS) in March 1998; Stanko Studen, one of the Radical Party's deputies for Sombor, was appointed as deputy minister of agriculture and was required to resign from the assembly. Ćuk was given a mandate as his replacement on 26 May 1998 and served as a supporter of the administration.

SPS leader Slobodan Milošević was defeated in the 2000 Yugoslavian presidential election, a watershed moment in Serbian and Yugoslavian politics. Ćuk stood as a candidate for Odžaci's second constituency seat in the concurrent 2000 Vojvodina provincial election and for the municipality's fifth seat in the 2000 Serbian local elections. He was defeated in both contests.

Serbia's SPS-led administration fell after Milošević's defeat, and a new provisional government was established pending new elections; the new administration did not include the SRS. A new Serbian parliamentary election was held in December 2000. As a result of reforms introduced before the vote, the entire country was counted as a single electoral division and all mandates were awarded at the discretion of successful parties and coalitions, irrespective of numerical order. Ćuk appeared in the eighty-ninth position on the Radical Party's list. The list won twenty-three mandates, and he was not included in the party's delegation. The term ended when the new assembly convened in January 2001.

Ćuk was given the fourteenth position on the SRS's list for the 2003 parliamentary election. The party won eighty-two seats, and on this occasion, he was included in its delegation when the assembly met in January 2004. Although the Radicals were the largest party in the assembly after the election, they fell short of a majority and served in opposition.

By its performance in the 2003 parliamentary election, the SRS had the right to appoint thirty delegates to the federal assembly of Serbia and Montenegro. Ćuk was given a federal mandate on 12 February 2004; by this appointment, he was required to resign from the national assembly. Ćuk served as an opposition member in the federal parliament for the next two years. The federal union of Serbia and Montenegro ceased to exist in 2006 when Montenegro declared independence.

Ćuk appeared on the Radical Party's electoral lists in the 2007 and 2008 parliamentary elections, though he was not given a mandate on either occasion.

=== Mayor of Odžaci ===
Serbia introduced the direct election of mayors in the 2004 local elections. Ćuk was elected as mayor of Odžaci, defeating Democratic Party (Demokratska stranka, DS) candidate Predrag Cvetanović in the second round. He faced a recall vote on 3 December 2006 and survived the challenge.

The direct election of mayors proved to be a short-lived experiment; for the 2008 local elections, Serbia's local election laws were reformed such that mayors would be chosen by the elected members of city and municipal assemblies. Ćuk led the Radical Party to victory in the 2008 cycle and was confirmed for another term in office afterward.

The Radical Party experienced a serious split in late 2008, with several members joining the more moderate Serbian Progressive Party (Srpska napredna stranka, SNS) under the leadership of Tomislav Nikolić and Aleksandar Vučić. Ćuk remained with the Radicals.

Ćuk's administration in Odžaci fell in 2009 after the SPS withdrew its support. He stood down as mayor in August 2009 and was appointed as the SRS's representative in a multi-party provisional administration. A new off-year local election was held in January 2010; weakened by the 2008 split, the SRS finished in fourth place with only three mandates. Ćuk was elected as one of the party's delegates and served as an opposition member of the local assembly for the next four years.

In 2012, Ćuk was indicted on charges of accepting bribes during his tenure as mayor. He denied the charges. Online sources do not indicate how the matter was resolved.

=== Provincial delegate ===
Vojvodina introduced a system of mixed proportional representation for the 2004 Vojvodina provincial election. Ćuk ran for the Radical Party in the redistributed Odžaci division and was defeated in the second round by SPS incumbent Đorđe Bogdanović, the same candidate who defeated him in the 2000 provincial election.

He was elected for the Odžaci constituency seat in the 2008 provincial election, defeating Bogdanović in another rematch. The DS and its allies won a majority victory, and the Radicals served in opposition for the next term.

Serbia's electoral laws were reformed in 2011, such that mandates were awarded in numerical order to candidates on successful lists in elections held under proportional representation. Ćuk did not seek re-election for the Odžaci constituency seat in the 2012 provincial election but instead appeared in the fifth position on the SRS's electoral list; he was re-elected when the list won exactly five mandates. The DS and its allies won the election, and the Radicals remained in opposition. On 22 June 2012, Ćuk was selected as one of the assembly's deputy speakers. He also served on the committee for determining provincial regulations in languages of official use and the committee on urbanism, spatial planning, and environmental protection.

Ćuk led the SRS's list for Odžaci in the 2013 Serbian local elections and appeared in the sixty-first position on the party's list for the 2014 parliamentary election. In both cases, the party failed to cross the electoral threshold to win representation in the relevant assembly.

Vojvodina switched to a system of full proportional representation for the 2016 provincial election. Ćuk was promoted to the second position on the Radical Party's list and was elected to a third term when the list won ten mandates. The Progressive Party and its allies won the election, and the Radicals continued once again in opposition.

Ćuk led the SRS list for Odźaci again in the 2017 local elections and was on this occasion re-elected to the local assembly when the list won two seats. He did not seek re-election at either the provincial or the local level in 2020.

== Electoral record ==
=== Provincial (Vojvodina) ===
2008 Vojvodina assembly election Odžaci (constituency seat) – First and second rounds
Candidate	Party or Coalition	Votes	%	Votes	%
Milan Ćuk	Serbian Radical Party	6,293	39.02	3,615	52.96
Dr. Đorđe Bogdanović (incumbent)	Socialist Party of Serbia	3,330	20.65	3,211	47.04
Mirko Bomeštar	For a European Vojvodina, Democratic Party–G17 Plus, Boris Tadić (Affiliation: Democratic Party)	3,203	19.86		
Jelena Škrbić	Christian Democratic Party of Serbia	2,056	12.75		
Viktor Hajnal	Hungarian Coalition–István Pásztor	628	3.89		
Zoran Đorđević	Together for Odžaci and Vojvodina Serbian Renewal Movement–League of Social Democrats of Vojvodina	616	3.82		
Total valid votes		16,126	100	6,826	100
Invalid ballots		494		248	
Total votes casts		16,620	58.67	7,074	24.97

2004 Vojvodina assembly election Odžaci (constituency seat) – First and second rounds
Candidate	Party or Coalition	Votes	%	Votes	%
Dr. Đorđe Bogdanović (incumbent)	Socialist Party of Serbia	2,195	21.26	4,066	53.60
Milan Ćuk	Serbian Radical Party	2,230	21.60	3,520	46.40
Mirko Bomeštar	Democratic Party	1,437	13.92		
Vladimir Košutić	Democratic Party of Serbia	1,000	9.69		
Dr. Ljubomir Milenković	Citizens' Group: Milivoje Mića Stošić–No Politics - Work as Soon as Possible	703	6.81		
Nedeljko Bjeletić	Strength of Serbia Movement	699	6.77		
Vladimir Danilovac	Serbian Renewal Movement	659	6.38		
Mile Mandić	Coalition: To Live Normally	538	5.21		
Dr. Dragan Nalčić	Coalition: Together for Vojvodina–Nenad Čanak	514	4.98		
Stevan Mirković	G17 Plus	240	2.32		
Ljubiša Miljković	New Serbia	108	1.05		
Total valid votes		10,323	100	7,586	100
Invalid ballots		333		715	
Total votes casts		10,656	37.31	8,301	29.06

2000 Vojvodina assembly election Odžaci II (constituency seat)
Candidate	Party or Coalition	Result
Đorđe Bogdanović	Socialist Party of Serbia–Yugoslav Left (Affiliation: Socialist Party of Serbia)	elected
Milan Ćuk	Serbian Radical Party	
other candidates		

=== Local (Odžaci) ===
2004 Odžaci municipal election Mayor of Odžaci – second round results
Candidate	Party or Coalition	Votes	%
Milan Ćuk	Serbian Radical Party	4,152	51.34
Predrag Cvetanović	Democratic Party	3,936	48.66
Total valid votes		8,088	100
