= Goran Jocić =

Serbian politician

Goran Jocić (Serbian Cyrillic: Горан Јоцић; born 20 November 1966) is a Serbian politician. He has served in the National Assembly of Serbia and the Assembly of Serbia and Montenegro and is now a member of the Doljevac municipal assembly. A member of the far-right Serbian Radical Party (Srpska radikalna stranka, SRS) for many years, Jocić joined the Serbian Progressive Party (Srpska napredna stranka, SNS) in the late 2010s.

== Private career ==
Jocić is a sales technician.

== Politician ==
=== Serbian Radical Party ===
Jocić was the leader of the Radical Party's municipal board in Doljevac in the mid-1990s and was the party's endorsed candidate for mayor in the 1996 Serbian local elections. He was not successful; the party only won one seat out of thirty-seven in the municipal assembly. Online sources do not indicate if Jocić was the SRS candidate elected.

==== First term in the National Assembly ====
Jocić appeared in the third position on the Radical Party's list for the Prokuplje division in the 1997 Serbian parliamentary election and was awarded a mandate when the list won three seats. (From 1992 to 2000, Serbia's electoral law stipulated that one-third of parliamentary mandates would be assigned to candidates from successful lists in numerical order, while the remaining two-thirds would be distributed amongst other candidates on the lists at the discretion of the sponsoring parties. It was common practice for the latter mandates to be awarded out of order. Jocić's list position did not give him the automatic right to a seat in parliament, but he was given a mandate all the same.) The SRS joined a coalition government led by the Socialist Party of Serbia (Socijalistička partija Srbije, SPS) in early 1998, and Jocić served as a supporter of the administration.

During the 1990s, Serbian politics was dominated by SPS leader Slobodan Milošević and his allies. Milošević was defeated by opposition candidate Vojislav Koštunica in the 2000 Yugoslavian presidential election, a watershed moment in Serbian politics. In the concurrent 2000 Serbian local elections, Jocić was again the Radical Party's endorsed candidate for mayor of Doljevac and was again unsuccessful when the party won only two seats in the local assembly.

The Serbian government fell after Milošević's defeat in the Yugoslavian election, and a new Serbian parliamentary election was called for December 2000. Prior to the vote, Serbia's electoral laws were reformed such that the entire country became a single electoral division and all mandates were awarded to candidates on successful lists at the discretion of the sponsoring parties and coalitions, irrespective of numerical order. Jocić was given the 124th position on the Radical Party's list; the list won only twenty-three seats, and he was not awarded a new mandate. His first term ended when the new assembly met in January 2001.

==== Second term in the National Assembly ====
Jocić received the seventy-ninth position on the SRS's list in the 2003 Serbian parliamentary election. The Radicals won eighty-two seats, emerging as the largest party in the assembly but falling well short of a majority and ultimately serving in opposition. Despite his position on the list, Jocić was not immediately selected for a mandate.

By virtue of its performance in the 2003 Serbian election, the Radical Party had the right to appoint thirty members to the federal assembly of Serbia and Montenegro. Several SRS delegates resigned from the national assembly to take seats in the federal body in February 2004, and Jocić was given a mandate as a replacement on 17 February. In parliament, he served on the committee for poverty alleviation.

In the 2004 local elections, Serbia introduced both the direct election of mayors and elections by proportional representation for local assemblies. Jocić ran for mayor of Doljevac and was defeated in the first round of voting. He also appeared in the first position on the SRS's list for the local assembly and was elected when the list won five seats. The direct election of mayors proved to be a short-lived experiment and was discontinued in 2008.

==== Federal parliamentarian ====
Jocić was awarded a mandate in the federal assembly of Serbia and Montenegro on 2 November 2004 as a replacement for Dragan Ljubujević, who had died earlier in the year. By virtue of receiving a federal seat, he was required to resign from the national assembly.

The federal assembly ceased to exist on 3 June 2006, when Montenegro declared independence.

==== Political activity from 2006 ====
Doljevac held an off-year municipal assembly election in November 2006, and Jocić again led the Radical Party's list. The results of the election do not appear to be available online.

He appeared in the 153rd position on the Radical Party's in the 2008 Serbian parliamentary election. The list won seventy-eight seats, and he was not selected for a new mandate. He also appeared in the tenth position on the Radical Party's list for Doljevac in the 2008 local elections.

The Serbian Radical Party experienced a serious split later in 2008, with several members leaving to join the more moderate Serbian Progressive Party under the leadership of Tomislav Nikolić and Aleksandar Vučić. Jocić initially remained with the Radicals.

Serbia's electoral laws were reformed again in 2011, such that all mandates were awarded to candidates on successful lists in numerical order. Jocić appeared in the 238th position on the Radical Party's list in the 2012 parliamentary election. Election from this position would have been a numerical impossibility, and the SRS list did not cross the electoral threshold in any event. The Radicals also lost all of their seats in Doljevac in the concurrent 2012 local elections.

Jocić appeared in the 166th position on the SRS's list in the 2016 parliamentary election; the list won twenty-two seats, and he was not re-elected. He was once again elected to the Doljevac assembly in the 2016 local elections when the Radicals won two mandates.

=== Serbian Progressive Party ===
Jocić left the Radicals after the 2016 elections and joined the Progressive Party. Doljevac held an off-year election in 2018; Jocić received the fourteenth position on the SNS list and was re-elected when the list won a landslide majority victory with twenty-seven mandates. He was later given the twelfth position on the party's list in the 2022 local elections and was once again re-elected when the list won thirty seats.

== Electoral record ==
=== Local (Doljevac) ===
2004 Municipality of Doljevac local election: Mayor of Doljevac
Candidate	Party	First round		Second round	
Candidate	Party	Votes	%	Votes	%
Goran Ljubić	Strength of Serbia Movement			4,814	51.27
Predrag Stanojević	Socialist Party of Serbia			4,575	48.73
Goran Jocić	Serbian Radical Party				
other candidates					
Total				9,389	100.00
