= Nenad Milojičić =

Serbian politician

- Ненад Милојичић

Member of the National Assembly of the Republic of Serbia
- Incumbent
- Assumed office 6 February 2024

Mayor of Smederevska Palanka
- In office 2008–2010
- Preceded by: Radoslav Cokić
- Succeeded by: Živko Petrović

Personal details
- Party: DS (start of political career); Narodna (until 2023); NPS (since 2023)
- Relatives: Radoslav Milojičić (step-brother)

Nenad Milojičić (Serbian Cyrillic: Ненад Милојичић; born 1978) is a Serbian politician. He was the mayor of Smederevska Palanka from 2008 to 2010 and has served in the National Assembly of Serbia since February 2024. Formerly a member of the Democratic Party (DS) and the People's Party (Narodna), Milojičić is now with the People's Movement of Serbia (NPS).

He is the step-brother of Radoslav Milojičić, the founder of the Serbian Left (SL) party.

== Early life and career ==
Milojičić was born in Smederevska Palanka, in what was then the Socialist Republic of Serbia in the Socialist Federal Republic of Yugoslavia. He has a master's degree as an educator and has been a national champion in school competitions. From 2015 to 2018, he was principal of the Vuk Karadžić Elementary School.

== Politician ==
=== Local politics in Smederevska Palanka ===
The Democratic Party won fourteen out of forty-nine seats in Smederevska Palanka in the 2008 Serbian local elections, emerging as the largest party in the assembly though falling well short of a majority. The party afterward formed a local coalition government with the Socialist Party of Serbia (SPS) and other parties, and Milojičić was chosen as the municipality's mayor. At the time, he was the youngest mayor in Serbia. He resigned unexpectedly in June 2010, saying that he did not want to "be a puppet" of party officials in Belgrade telling him how to run the community. Prior to his resignation, he was the leader of the Democratic Party's regional organization for the Podunavlje District.

Milojičić later joined Vuk Jeremić's People's Party and led its electoral list for Smederevska Palanka in the 2018 local elections. Media reports noted that one of his electoral rivals was his step-brother, who was at this time the leader of the local Democratic Party organization. Milojičić was elected to the municipal assembly when the People's Party list won three seats. The Serbian Progressive Party (SNS) won a landslide majority victory, and he served afterward in opposition.

Milojičić again led the People's Party list for Smederevska Palanka in the 2022 local elections and was re-elected when the list won four seats. The SNS once again won a majority government.

The People's Party experienced a serious split in 2023, and Milojičić joined the breakaway People's Movement of Serbia.

=== Parliamentarian ===
The People's Movement of Serbia participated in the 2023 Serbian parliamentary election as part of the Serbia Against Violence coalition. Milojičić received the forty-second position on the coalition's electoral list and was elected when the list won sixty-five seats. The SNS and its allies won a majority victory, and he now serves in opposition as part of the NPS–New Face of Serbia (NLS) assembly group. Milojičić is a deputy member of the agriculture committee (Note: Formally known as the Agriculture, Forestry, and Water Management Committee.) and the labour committee. (Note: Formally known as the Committee on Labour, Social Issues, Social Inclusion, and Poverty Reduction.)
