= Živko Marković =

Serbian politician

Živko Marković (Serbian Cyrillic: Живко Марковић; born 23 March 1952), known as Bata, is a Serbian politician. He has served two terms in the Assembly of Vojvodina and three terms as president of the Pećinci municipal assembly. During his time as an elected official, Marković was a member of the Democratic Party (DS).

== Private career ==
Marković is from the village of Subotište in Pećinci. He is a graduated manager.

== Politician ==
Marković was the Democratic Party's candidate for Stara Pazova II and Pećinci in the 1990 Serbian parliamentary election, the first to be held after the re-introduction of multi-party democracy. He was not successful; the winning candidate was Tode Vojvodić of the Serb Democratic Party.

=== Municipal politics ===
The Democratic Party joined the Democratic Opposition of Serbia (DOS), an ideologically diverse coalition of parties opposed to Slobodan Milošević's administration, in early 2000. DOS candidate Vojislav Koštunica defeated Milošević in the 2000 Yugoslavian presidential election, a watershed moment in Serbian politics.

Milošević's Socialist Party of Serbia (SPS) actually won a majority victory in the Pećinci municipal assembly in the 2000 Serbian local elections, but the local Socialist board realized the party could not form a viable administration under the changed political circumstances and instead permitted the DOS govern the municipality. Marković was the vice-president of the assembly's executive board (i.e., effectively the deputy leader of the municipal government) in the 2000–04 term.

After the inconclusive 2004 local election in the municipality, the DS formed a coalition government with other parties, and Marković was named as assembly president. In a 2007 interview, he drew attention to the municipality's high level of investment after the creation of a special economic zone in Šimanovci.

The Democratic Party won the 2008 local election in Pećinci with twelve out of thirty seats. The party again formed a local coalition government, and Marković again served as assembly president for the term that followed. He continued to promote the local government's track record to attracting investment.

The DS once again won a plurality victory in Pećinci in the 2012 local election and afterward formed a new coalition government with the Socialist Party of Serbia (SPS) and two citizens' groups. Marković, who led the DS's electoral list for the municipality, was chosen for a third term as assembly president in June 2012. He did not remain in the position for long. The Serbian Progressive Party (SNS) and the United Regions of Serbia (URS) formed a new coalition administration with the SPS and other parties the following month; Marković was removed from office and served in opposition.

The local government formed in July 2012 proved unstable, and the municipal assembly was dissolved in October 2013. A provisional government was set up without DS representation, notwithstanding Marković's contention that the party deserved two seats by virtue of its performance in the previous election. Marković led the DS's list in the 2014 local election and was re-elected when the list won five mandates. The SNS and its allies won a majority victory, and Marković remained in opposition.

Marković appeared in the second position on the DS's list in the 2017 local election and was again elected when the list won three mandates. The SNS alliance again won a majority government.

The DS boycotted the 2020 Serbian local elections, and Marković was not a candidate for re-election.

=== Provincial politics ===
Marković appeared in the twenty-fourth position on the DS's electoral list in the 2008 Vojvodina provincial election and was awarded a mandate when the list won twenty-three seats. (Prior to a 2011 reform, mandates in elections held under proportional representation were assigned to candidates on successful lists at the discretion of the sponsoring parties or coalitions, and it was common practice for the mandates to be assigned out of numerical order. Marković's list position had no bearing on his chances of election.) The DS and its allies won a majority government, and he supported the administration in the assembly. He resigned his seat in May 2010 due to a change in Vojvodina's conflict-of-interest laws involving dual mandates.

Marković was re-elected to the provincial assembly for the Pećinci constituency seat in the 2012 provincial election. The DS-led alliance again won the election, and he served as a government supporter for the next four years. During his second term, he was a member of the committee on administrative and mandate issues and the committee on European integration and interregional cooperation.

Vojvodina switched to a system of full proportional representation for the 2016 Vojvodina provincial election. Marković received the sixty-seventh position on the DS's electoral list and was not re-elected when the list fell to only ten seats.

== Electoral record ==
=== Provincial (Vojvodina) ===
2012 Vojvodina provincial election: Pećinci
Candidate	Party	First round		Second round	
Candidate	Party	Votes	%	Votes	%
Živko Marković Bata	Choice for a Better Vojvodina–Bojan Pajtic (Affiliation: Democratic Party)	3,435	30.83	5,195	59.68
Đorđe Arsenijević	Let's Get Vojvodina Moving–Tomislav Nikolić (Serbian Progressive Party, New Serbia, Movement of Socialists, Strength of Serbia Movement)	2,271	20.38	3,510	40.32
Vukica Sever	United Regions of Serbia–Sava Čojčić	1,442	12.94		
Milan Stepanović	Socialist Party of Serbia (SPS), Party of United Pensioners of Serbia (PUPS), United Serbia (JS), Social Democratic Party of Serbia (SDP Serbia) (Affiliation: For Our Village–United Serbia)	1,326	11.90		
Jovan Devrnja	Citizens' Group: Prof. Đura Trudić, Teacher Jovan Devrnja	944	8.47		
Vesna Vilotijević	Serbian Radical Party	708	6.35		
Saša Ristivojević	Citizens' Group: Moj Šor, Avlija i Komšija	524	4.70		
Svetislav Štetić	Democratic Party of Serbia–Dr. Vojislav Koštunica	491	4.41		
Total		11,141	100.00	8,705	100.00

=== National Assembly of Serbia ===
1990 Serbian parliamentary election: Stara Pazova II and Pećinci
Candidate	Party
Dušan Bošković	Serbian National Renewal
Dr. Tode Vojvodić (***WINNER***)	Serb Democratic Party
Perica Koturović	Socialist Party of Serbia
Živko Marković	Democratic Party
Putnik Mitrić	Party of Independent Businessmen and Farmers
Mitar Mitrović	People's Peasant Party
Borivoje Petrović	People's Radical Party
Svetozar Rakić	Serbian Renewal Movement
Total
