= Sedlar =

Sedlar, Седлар is a South Slavic surname. Notable people with the surname include:

- Aleksandar Sedlar (born 1991), Serbian football player
- Jakov Sedlar (born 1952), Croatian film director
- Snežana Sedlar
- Zlatko Sedlar (born 1972), Croatian slalom canoeist
