= Nebojša Pavlović =

Nebojša Pavlović may refer to:

- Nebojša Pavlović (footballer)
- Nebojša Pavlović (politician)
