= Stambolić =

Stambolić is a Serbian surname Стамболић. Notable people with the surname include:

- Ivan Stambolić (1936–2000), Serbian politician
- Petar Stambolić (1912–2007), Yugoslav politician
- Vesna Stambolić (born 1961), Serbian politician
