= Jocic =

Jocić or Jočić are Serbian surnames. Notable people with the surname include:

== Jocić ==
- Đorđe Jocić (born 1991), Serbian footballer
- Goran Jocić (born 1966), Serbian politician
- Ljubica Živković, née Jocić (1936–2017), Serbian chess player
- Sonja Jocić (born 1988), Serbian fashion designer
- Sreten Jocić (born 1962), Serbian gangster
- Stanoje Jocić (born 1932), Serbian footballer
- Vera Jocić (1923–1944), Yugoslav partisan
- Vladimir Jocić (born 1953), Serbian football manager
- Živojin Jocić (1870–1914), Serbian organic chemist

== Jočić ==
- Bogdan Jočić (born 2001), Serbian football player
- Branimir Jočić (born 1994), Serbian footballer
- Dragan Jočić (born 1960), Serbian politician
- Miroslav Jočić (born 1962), Serbian judoka
