= Serbian Left =

Serbian Left may refer to:

- Serbian Left (2015), defunct political party in Serbia
- Serbian Left (2022), a political party in Serbia led by Radoslav Milojičić
