= Sava Čojčić =

Serbian politician (born 1968)

Sava Čojčić (Serbian Cyrillic: Сава Чојчић; born 15 January 1968) is a Serbian politician. He served in the National Assembly of Serbia from 2008 to 2011 and was the mayor Pećinci from 2012 to 2013. Čojčić has at different times been a member of G17 Plus, the United Regions of Serbia (URS), and the Serbian Progressive Party (SNS).

== Early life and private career ==
Čojčić was born in the Belgrade municipality of Zemun, in what was then the Socialist Republic of Serbia in the Socialist Federal Republic of Yugoslavia. He is a graduated economist.

== Politician ==
=== Deputy president of the Pećinci assembly (2004–12) ===
Čojčić led G17 Plus's electoral list for Pećinci in the 2004 Serbian local elections and was elected when the list won a single seat. The election was inconclusive, with eleven different lists winning representation in the municipal assembly. The Democratic Party (DS) ultimately formed a coalition government that included G17 Plus, and Čojčić was named as deputy president of the assembly.

G17 Plus won two seats in Pećinci in the 2008 Serbian local elections, and Čojčić was re-elected to the assembly. He was appointed to a second term as deputy president in June 2008.

=== Parliamentarian (2008–11) ===
G17 Plus contested the 2008 Serbian parliamentary election as part of the For a European Serbia (ZES) alliance led by the Democratic Party. Čojčić received the 243rd position (out of 250) on the list and received a mandate when the list won 102 seats. (From 2000 to 2011, Serbian parliamentary mandates were awarded to sponsoring parties or coalitions rather than to individual candidates, and it was common practice for the mandates to be assigned out of numerical order. Čojčić's position on the list, which was mostly alphabetical, had no bearing on his chances of election.) The overall result of the election was inconclusive, but ZES ultimately formed a coalition government with the Socialist Party of Serbia (SPS), and Čojčić served as a government supporter. He was a member of the committee for relations with Serbs outside Serbia. He resigned his seat on 2 March 2011 to permit G17 Plus leader Mlađan Dinkić to enter the assembly.

Serbia's electoral laws were reformed in 2011, such that all mandates were awarded to candidates on successful lists in numerical order. G17 Plus contested the 2012 parliamentary election at the head of an alliance known as the United Regions of Serbia. Čojčić appeared in the 131st position on the alliance's list and was not re-elected when it won only sixteen seats.

Čojčić also appeared in the seventh position on the URS's list in the 2012 Vojvodina provincial election. The list did not cross the electoral threshold for representation in the assembly.

=== Mayor of Pećinci (2012–13) ===
Čojčić appeared in the second position on the URS list for Pećinci in the 2012 local elections and was re-elected when the list won four seats. A governing coalition that did not include the URS was established in June 2012, and Čojčić initially served in opposition. The following month, however, the URS formed a new coalition with the Serbian Progressive Party (SNS) and the Socialist Party. Čojčić was chosen as the municipality's mayor.

The United Regions of Serbia became a unified political party in April 2013. Čojčić joined the new organization, although he did not remain a member for long. He and entire URS group in the Pećinci assembly joined the SNS in June of the same year.

The coalition government formed in Pećinci in 2012 proved to be unstable, and the local assembly was dissolved in November 2013. Čojčić was appointed to lead a provisional administration pending a new election. He appeared in the eleventh position on the SNS's list for the March 2014 local election and was re-elected when the list won a majority victory with seventeen seats. He was not chosen for another term as mayor but instead became president of the assembly for the term that followed.

=== Since 2014 ===
Čojčić did not appear on the SNS's electoral list in Pećinci for the 2017 local elections but was instead given the third position on the list of United Serbia (JS). The list did not cross the electoral threshold.
