= Latinka Vasiljković =

Serbian politician

Latinka Vasiljković (Serbian Cyrillic: Латинка Васиљковић; born 1981) is a politician in Serbia. She was the administrator of the West Bačka District from 2015 to 2017 and the mayor of Odžaci from 2017 to 2020. Since 2020, she has been a member of the Assembly of Vojvodina. Vasiljković is a member of the Serbian Progressive Party.

== Private career ==
Vasiljković is a master of technical sciences, specializing in traffic. She lives in Odžaci.

== Politician ==
=== Municipal and regional politics ===
Vasiljković became president of the community council for the Town of Odžaci (within the Odžaci municipality) in May 2014. In May 2015, she was appointed as administrator of the West Bačka District. She held this role for two years; in 2017, she was appointed as president of a provisional authority for the Odžaci municipality pending new local elections.

Vasiljković led the Progressive Party's electoral list to a majority victory in Odžaci for the 2017 Serbian local elections, with the list winning sixteen of twenty-seven mandates. She was chosen as mayor following the election and held this role for the next three years. She did not seek re-election at the local level in 2020.

=== Assembly of Vojvodina ===
Vasiljković received the thirty-fourth position on the Progressive Party's Aleksandar Vučić — For Our Children list in the 2020 Vojvodina provincial election and was elected when the list won a majority victory with seventy-six out of 120 mandates. She was appointed as chair of the assembly committee on gender equality in October 2020 and is also of a member of the committee on petitions and motions.
