= Communist Party (Serbia) =

Titoist political party in Serbia

Communist Party Комунистичка партија Komunistička partija
- Abbreviation: KP
- President: Joška Broz
- Secretary-General: Miroslav Jovanović
- Founder: Joška Broz
- Founded: 28 November 2010
- Dissolved: 23 January 2022
- Merger of: New Communist Party of Serbia; Social Democrats of Novi Sad
- Succeeded by: Serbian Left
- Headquarters: Uralska 9; 11060 Belgrade
- Youth wing: Communist Youth (KO)
- Ideology: Communism; Marxism–Leninism; Titoism; Yugoslavism
- Political position: Far-left
- Colours: Red and Ochre
- Slogan: “Workers of the World, Unite!”

Website
- www.kp.rs

The Communist Party (Serbian: Комунистичка партија, romanized: Komunistička partija; abbr. КП or KP) was a Titoist political party in Serbia.

== History ==
It was founded in Belgrade in November 2009, after two smaller communist parties (the New Communist Party of Serbia (NKPS) and the Social Democrats from Novi Sad) united with a group of communists. Josip Joška Broz (grandson of the former Yugoslav president and communist revolutionary Josip Broz Tito), was elected as its president. Its Secretary-General is Miroslav Jovanović.

The Communist Party competed in the 2012 parliamentary elections independently, receiving 28,977 votes or 0.74% of the popular vote, failing to enter parliament. A similar situation happened in the 2014 parliamentary elections when the Communist Party (in coalition with Montenegrin Party) received 6,388 votes or 0.18% of the popular vote and again failed to enter parliament. However, for the 2016 parliamentary elections, the Communist Party joined a coalition led by the Socialist Party of Serbia that received 413,770 votes or 10.95% of the popular vote and entered the Parliament of Serbia and also the Parliament of the Autonomous Province of Vojvodina.

In January 2022, it was announced that the Communist Party changed name to the Serbian Left, with Radoslav Milojičić being elected president.

== Organization ==
The head of the party is the President, next in the hierarchy is the Secretary-General and after him is the party's Central Committee. The party is split into committees led by committee secretaries and also into basic organizations led by commissioners.

== Presidents ==
#	President	Born–Died	Term start	Term end
1	Joška Broz	1947–2025	2010	2022

== Electoral results ==
=== Parliamentary elections ===
Year	Leader	Vote(s)	%	Seats	±	Arrangements	Status
2012	Joška Broz (Note: Party leader. Coalition leader is Ivica Dačić.)	28,977	0.74%	0 / 250	Steady		N/A
2014	Joška Broz	6,388	0.18%	0 / 250	Steady	With CP	N/A
2016	Joška Broz	413,770	10.95%	1 / 250	▲1	With SPS–JS–ZS	Government support
2020	Joška Broz	334,333	10.38%	1 / 250	Steady	With SPS–JS–ZS	Government support
