= Vesna Stambolić =

Serbian politician

Vesna Stambolić (Serbian Cyrillic: Весна Стамболић; born 5 February 1961) is a politician in Serbia. She was the mayor of Lučani from 2015 to 2019 and has served in the National Assembly of Serbia since 2020. Stambolić is a member of the Serbian Progressive Party.

== Early life and career ==
Stambolić was born in Leskovac, in what was then the People's Republic of Serbia in the People's Federal Republic of Yugoslavia. She graduated from the University of Belgrade Faculty of National Defence and subsequently worked as manager of the House of Culture in Lučani.

== Politician ==
=== Municipal ===
Stambolić received the third position on the Progressive Party's electoral list for the municipal assembly of Lučani in the 2014 Serbian local elections and was elected when the list won a majority victory with twenty-four mandates. She was chosen as mayor when the assembly met on 26 February 2015. The Progressive Party organization in Lučani was divided during this period, and Stambolić was an extremely vocal critic of her predecessor as mayor, fellow party member Slobodan Jolović, whom she accused of mismanaging various municipal projects.

She led the Progressive Party list in the 2018 local elections and was returned when the list won a second majority with twenty-seven mandates. She stood down as mayor after the election and was instead appointed as president (i.e., speaker) of the municipal assembly.

=== Member of the National Assembly ===
Stambolić received the 124th position on the Progressive Party's Aleksandar Vučić — For Our Children coalition list in the 2020 Serbian parliamentary election and was elected when the list won a landslide majority with 188 out of 250 mandates. She is now a member of the assembly committee on the economy, regional development, trade, tourism, and energy; a deputy member of the health and family committee and the committee on the rights of the child; and a member of the parliamentary friendship groups with Australia, Austria, Belgium, China, Egypt, France, Germany, Greece, Italy, Japan, Norway, Slovenia, Spain, Sweden, Switzerland, the United Kingdom, and the United States of America.
