= Predrag Cvetanović =

Serbian politician

Predrag Cvetanović (Serbian Cyrillic: Предраг Цветановић; born 1967) is a politician in Serbia. He was the mayor of Odžaci from 2010 to 2012 and served in the Assembly of Vojvodina from 2012 to 2016. During his time as an elected official, Cvetanović was a member of the Democratic Party (Demokratska stranka, DS).

== Private career ==
Cvetanović is an English teacher based in Odžaci.

== Politician ==
Serbia introduced the direct election of mayors in the 2004 local elections. Cvetanović was the DS's nominee in Odžaci; he was defeated by Milan Ćuk of the far-right Serbian Radical Party (Srpska radikalna stranka, SRS) in the second round. The direct election of mayors proved to be a short-lived experiment and was abandoned in the 2008 local elections.

Cvetanović was elected to the Odžaci municipal assembly in a 2010 off-year municipal election and was chosen as mayor when the DS won a plurality victory. The highlight of his mayoralty was signing an agreement in July 2012 with Magna Seating Chomutov (a unit of Canada's Magna International), in which the company received free land for a plant assembling car-seat covers.

He was elected to the Vojvodina assembly in the 2012 provincial election for the Odžaci constituency seat. The DS and its allies won the election, and Cvetanović served for the next four years as a supporter of the administration. He was a member of the province's security committee and the committee for the organization of administration and local self-government.

Vojvodina switched to a system of full proportional representation for the 2016 Vojvodina provincial election. Cvetanović was not a candidate for re-election.

== Electoral record ==
=== Provincial (Vojvodina) ===
2012 Vojvodina assembly election Odžaci (constituency seat) – first and second rounds
| Predrag Cvetanović | Choice for a Better Vojvodina–Bojan Pajtić (Affiliation: Democratic Party) | 3,094 | 20.61 | 7,199 | 57.40 |
| Đorđe Bogdanović | Socialist Party of Serbia (SPS), Party of United Pensioners of Serbia (PUPS), United Serbia (JS), Social Democratic Party of Serbia (SDP Serbia) | 3,668 | 24.43 | 5,962 | 45.30 |
| Nikola Stamenković | Let's Get Vojvodina Moving–Tomislav Nikolić (Serbian Progressive Party, New Serbia, Movement of Socialists, Strength of Serbia Movement) | 2,973 | 19.80 | | |
| Dobrislav Prelić | Serbian Radical Party | 1,562 | 10.40 | | |
| Snežana Sedlar | United Regions of Serbia–Snežana Sedlar | 1,444 | 9.62 | | |
| Goran Lazarević | Democratic Party of Serbia | 1,077 | 7.17 | | |
| Vensa Gorač | "Čedomir Jovanović–Vojvodina U-Turn (LDP–SPO–VP–SDU–Rich Serbia)" | 816 | 5.44 | | |
| Viktor Hajnal | Alliance of Vojvodina Hungarians | 379 | 2.52 | | |
| Total valid votes | | 15,013 | 100 | 13,161 | 100 |

=== Local (Odžaci) ===
2004 Odžaci municipal election Mayor of Odžaci – second round results
| Milan Ćuk | Serbian Radical Party | 4,152 | 51.34 |
| Predrag Cvetanović | Democratic Party | 3,936 | 48.66 |
| Total valid votes | | 8,088 | 100 |
