= Joška Broz =

Serbian politician (1947–2025)

- Јошка Броз
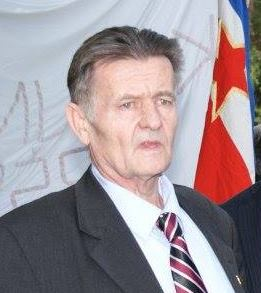
- Broz in 2014

President of the Communist Party of Serbia
- In office 28 November 2010 – 23 January 2022

Member of the National Assembly
- In office 3 June 2016 – 1 August 2022

Personal details
- Born: Josip Broz; 6 December 1947 Belgrade, PR Serbia, FPR Yugoslavia
- Died: 3 June 2025 (aged 77) Belgrade, Serbia
- Party: Communist Party (2010–2022); Serbian Left (2022–2025)
- Relations: Josip Broz Tito (grandfather)
- Education: University of Belgrade

Josip "Joška" Broz (Serbian Cyrillic: Јосип "Јошка" Броз; 6 December 1947 – 3 June 2025) was a Serbian politician. A self-professed Yugoslav, Broz was the grandson of Yugoslav president Josip Broz Tito and one of the most prominent supporters of the Titoist legacy within the former Yugoslavia.

Broz led Serbia's Communist Party from its formation in 2009 and served in the National Assembly of Serbia from 2016 to 2022, sitting with the Socialist Party of Serbia (SPS) parliamentary group.

== Background and private career ==
Broz was born in Belgrade, in what was then the People's Republic of Serbia in the Federal People's Republic of Yugoslavia. He was the eldest son of Tito's son Žarko Broz and Tamara Veger, a Russian. He earned a degree from the Belgrade University Faculty of Forest Management, and at different times worked at military game preserves (where he learned to cook wild game) and as a forester, metal worker, and policeman in charge of security for his grandfather. Although he was in frequent contact with Tito, he was not raised in affluent conditions and did not become wealthy by inheritance; a 2002 newspaper profile described him as living in a small, dilapidated house in Belgrade's Dedinje area and working as a cook in Zemun. "I am not sorry because the family has nothing," he was quoted as saying. "My grandpa raised me to be a modest man, not different from ordinary people." He added that his modesty helped him to survive the tragedies that befell Serbia and Yugoslavia in the 1990s.

Broz consistently defended Tito's political legacy and rejected charges that his grandfather was a dictator. At a memorial ceremony for Tito in 2000, he argued that his grandfather had permitted the 1968 student demonstrations in Yugoslavia to take place and subsequently addressed the underlying issues behind the protests by political means. He also remarked that Tito had confided to him in 1978 that his greatest mistake was allowing nationalists in Yugoslavia to present their beliefs for public discussion. Broz later welcomed the founding of the (ceremonial) "Republic of Titoslavia" in Rakovica, Bosnia and Herzegovina in 2005; he was quoted as saying, "This does not reflect some fashion trend or nostalgic feelings about Tito's state, which has been and forever gone. This reflects nostalgia about the time when we all lived well, when we all, generally, lived happy and dignified lives. Today, we are nobody and nothing." In 2010, he said that the Tito years were "a time of safety and security; a working father could support a whole family, education and healthcare was free for all [and] Yugoslavia had a good reputation around the globe."

== Political career ==
Broz campaigned for a coalition of four minor left-wing parties in the 2003 parliamentary election. He used Tito's image and the motto, "Where I stopped, you continue," in the campaign. Ultimately, the coalition did not win any seats.

On 23 November 2009, Broz was elected as the leader of Serbia's newly formed Communist Party, created via a merger of his own political organization with Novi Sad's Union of Social Democrats and Zrenjanin's New Communist Party. In an interview with Danas, Broz said that the new party would try to reconnect all of the former Yugoslav republics on social and economic issues; he added that he accepted the need for greater integration with the European Union but that only Russia could be a strategic partner for Serbia. The party was officially registered in December 2010.

In 2011, the Jamahiriya News Agency reported that Broz sent a cable of condolence to Muammar Gaddafi, his family, and the Libyan people following the death of Saif al-Arab Gaddafi in a North Atlantic Treaty Organization (NATO) bomb strike in the 2011 military intervention in Libya. According to the report, Broz described the attack on Libya as a criminal act.

Broz led the Communist Party's electoral list of sixty candidates in the 2012 Serbian parliamentary election. The party received 28,977 votes (0.74%), well below the five per cent threshold needed to enter the assembly. For the 2014 parliamentary election, he formed an alliance with the small Montenegrin Party and appeared in the second position on its electoral list. This list also failed to win any mandates.

=== Parliamentarian ===
Broz contested the 2016 parliamentary election on an electoral list led by the Socialist Party of Serbia, appearing in the twenty-eighth position. The list won twenty-nine mandates, and Broz was elected to the assembly. Although he was the leader of the Communist Party, he served as part of the Socialist Party's parliamentary group. The Socialist Party is a part of Serbia's coalition government, and Broz accordingly served as part of the government's parliamentary majority. During his first term, he was a member of the committee on labour, social issues, social inclusion, and poverty reduction; a deputy member of the environmental protection committee; and a member of the parliamentary friendship groups with Algeria, Belarus, China, Cuba, Greece, Iran, Palestine, Russia, Ukraine, Venezuela, Syria, and the countries of Sub-Saharan Africa. He was re-elected in the 2020 parliamentary election, again on the list of the Socialist Party.

In 2022, he helped to established the Serbian Left (SL) as a successor to the Communist Party. The Serbian Left did not participate in the 2022 parliamentary election, and his term in office ended that year.

== Personal life and death ==
Broz was an Eastern Orthodox Christian. Broz died in Belgrade on 3 June 2025, at the age of 77.
