= Nikola Pavković =

Serbian politician (born 1956)

Nikola Pavković (Serbian Cyrillic: Никола Павковић; born 1956) is a Serbian politician. He was the mayor of Pećinci from 2000 to 2008 and served in the Assembly of Vojvodina from 2008 to 2012. During his time as an elected official, Pavković was a member of the Democratic Party (DS).

== Private career ==
Pavković is a specialist doctor. In a 2003 interview, he said that he entered politics "out of pure desperation ... the moment he realized that there was no fall of communism in Pećinci."

== Politician ==
=== Mayor of Pećinci ===
The Democratic Party joined the Democratic Opposition of Serbia (DOS), an ideologically diverse coalition of parties opposed to Slobodan Milošević's administration, in early 2000. DOS candidate Vojislav Koštunica defeated Milošević in the 2000 Yugoslavian presidential election, a watershed moment in Serbian politics.

Milošević's Socialist Party of Serbia (SPS) actually won a majority victory in the Pećinci municipal assembly in the 2000 Serbian local elections, but the local Socialist board realized the party could not form a viable administration under the changed political circumstances and instead permitted the DOS govern the municipality. Pavković, who had been elected as a DOS candidate, was chosen as president of the assembly, a position that was at the time equivalent to mayor.

Serbia introduced the direct election of mayors in the 2004 local elections and also separated the offices of mayor and assembly president. Pavković was re-elected as mayor of Pećinci, defeating a candidate of the far-right Serbian Radical Party (SRS) in the second round of voting. In a March 2008 interview, Pavković said that Pećinci had achieved Serbia's largest budget per capita in Serbia due to a strong level of investment. He also announced in the same period that the municipality had signed a protocol on the construction of a university.

His term as mayor ended in 2008.

=== Politics at the republic and provincial levels ===
Pavković appeared in the 199th position (out of 250) on the DS's electoral list in the 2003 Serbian parliamentary election. The list won 37 seats, and he was not included in the party's delegation. (From 2000 to 2011, mandates in Serbian parliamentary elections were awarded to successful parties or coalitions rather than individual candidates, and it was common practice for the mandates to be assigned out of numerical order. Pavković could have been given a mandate despite his low position on the list, but he was not.)

He received the 181st position on the DS's list in the 2007 parliamentary election and again did not receive a mandate.

Pavković was elected for the Pećinci constituency seat in the 2008 Vojvodina provincial election. The DS and its allies won a majority government, and he served in the provincial assembly as a supporter of the administration. He was not a candidate for re-election in 2012.

== Electoral record ==
=== Provincial (Vojvodina) ===
2008 Vojvodina provincial election: Pećinci
Candidate	Party	First round		Second round	
Candidate	Party	Votes	%	Votes	%
Dr. Nikola Pavković	"For a European Vojvodina–Democratic Party–G17 Plus–Boris Tadić" (Affiliation: Democratic Party)	4,470	42.77	3,793	62.70
Duško Dobrilović	Serbian Radical Party	3,119	29.84	2,256	37.30
Milan Aleksić Munja	Democratic Party of Serbia–New Serbia–Vojislav Koštunica	1,236	11.83		
Sava Đurđević Ćata	Party of United Pensioners of Serbia	866	8.29		
Aleksandar Kovačević	Liberal Democratic Party	761	7.28		
Total		10,452	100.00	6,049	100.00
Valid votes		10,452	91.28	6,049	97.31
Invalid/blank votes		998	8.72	167	2.69
Total votes		11,450	100.00	6,216	100.00

=== Local (Pećinci) ===
2004 Municipality of Pećinci local election: Mayor of Pećinci
Candidate	Party	First round		Second round	
Candidate	Party	Votes	%	Votes	%
Nikola Pavković (incumbent)	Democratic Party			2,865	55.58
Lazar Čavić	Serbian Radical Party			2,290	44.42
other candidates					
Total				5,155	100.00
