= December 1992 Yugoslavian parliamentary election =

Early parliamentary elections were held in the Federal Republic of Yugoslavia between 20 December 1992 and 3 January 1993, following changes to the constitution in September 1992. The Socialist Party of Serbia emerged as the largest party in Parliament, winning 47 of the 138 seats.

== Results ==
Party	Votes	%	Seats	+/–
Serbia
Socialist Party of Serbia	1,478,918	33.34	47	–26
Serbian Radical Party	1,024,983	23.11	30	0
Democratic Movement of Serbia	809,731	18.26	20	+20
Democratic Party	280,183	6.32	5	+5
Serbian Opposition (NS–SDS)	200,044	4.51	0	0
Democratic Fellowship of Vojvodina Hungarians	106,036	2.39	3	+1
DS–RDSV	101,234	2.28	2	+2
Serbian National Renewal	112,912	2.55	0	–
Social Democratic Party	71,229	1.61	0	–
DS–RDSV–GSS	58,505	1.32	1	+1
League of Communists – Movement for Yugoslavia	43,564	0.98	0	–
LSV–NSS	35,943	0.81	0	–
Peasants Party of Serbia	29,915	0.67	0	–
Yugoslav Democratic Party of Goodwill	17,401	0.39	0	–
Democratic Party of Albanians	14,954	0.34	0	–
Democratic Alliance of Croats in Vojvodina	13,725	0.31	0	–
New Green Party	7,450	0.17	0	–
Democratic Reform Party of Muslims	6,534	0.15	0	–
New Communist Movement	5,678	0.13	0	–
Workers' Party of Yugoslavia	4,222	0.10	0	–
Movement for the Protection of Human Rights	3,427	0.08	0	–
Democratic Political Party of Roma	2,496	0.06	0	–
Yugoslav Democratic Party	2,105	0.05	0	–
Independents	4,029	0.09	0	0
Total	4,435,218	100.00	108	+2
Valid votes	4,435,218	94.47		
Invalid/blank votes	259,751	5.53		
Total votes	4,694,969	100.00		
Registered voters/turnout	6,967,857	67.38		
Montenegro
Democratic Party of Socialists of Montenegro	130,431	47.48	17	–6
Socialist Party of Montenegro	36,390	13.25	5	+5
People's Party	34,436	12.54	4	+4
Serbian Radical Party of Montenegro	31,556	11.49	4	+1
Party of Democratic Action of Montenegro	11,706	4.26	0	–
League of Communists – Movement for Yugoslavia	7,643	2.78	0	–
People's Democratic Party–Serbian Democratic Party	6,548	2.38	0	–
Association of Fighters '91–'92	4,349	1.58	0	–
Democratic Party of Montenegro	4,214	1.53	0	–
Demo-Christian (Orthodox) Party	2,850	1.04	0	–
Serbian National Renewal for Montenegro and Herzegovina	2,643	0.96	0	–
Serbian Fatherland Movement	983	0.36	0	–
Federal Party of Yugoslavs	955	0.35	0	–
Total	274,704	100.00	30	0
Valid votes	274,704	95.17		
Invalid/blank votes	13,933	4.83		
Total votes	288,637	100.00		
Registered voters/turnout	426,915	67.61		
Source: Nohlen & Stöver, Slavic Research Centre
