= Nebojša Pavlović (politician) =

Serbian politician

Nebojša Pavlović (Serbian Cyrillic: Небојша Павловић; born 1993) is a politician in Serbia. He has served in the National Assembly of Serbia since 2020 as a member of the Serbian Progressive Party.

== Private career ==
Pavlović was raised in Smederevska Palanka, where he still resides. He holds a bachelor's degree from the University of Belgrade Faculty of Law.

== Politician ==
=== Municipal and regional politics ===
Pavlović was appointed to the Smederevska Palanka municipal council (i.e., the executive branch of the municipal government) in May 2016 with responsibility for work and social protection. From December 2016 to March 2018, he was assistant to the mayor in charge of liaison with ministries in the government of Serbia.

He received the thirty-second position on the electoral list of the Serbian Progressive Party for the Smederevska Palanka municipal assembly in the 2018 local elections and was elected when the list won a majority victory with thirty-seven mandates. Following the election, he was chosen as deputy president (i.e., deputy speaker) of the assembly.

In November 2018, he was appointed as administrative head of the Podunavlje District. He served in this position for the next two years.

=== Member of the National Assembly ===
Pavlović received the 126th position on the Progressive Party's Aleksandar Vučić — For Our Children coalition list in the 2020 Serbian parliamentary election and was elected when the list won a landslide majority with 188 out of 250 mandates. He is now a member of the assembly committee on the judiciary, public administration, and local self-government; a deputy member of the defence and internal affairs committee and the agriculture, forestry, and water management committee; the head of Serbia's parliamentary friendship group with the State of Palestine; and a member of the parliamentary friendship groups with Armenia, Austria, Belgium, Bulgaria, China, Cuba, France, Germany, Greece, Italy, Mexico, Russia, Slovenia, South Korea, Switzerland, Turkey, the United Arab Emirates, the United Kingdom, and the United States of America.
