= Uroš Đokić =

Serbian politician (born 1982)

- Урош Ђокић

Member of the National Assembly of the Republic of Serbia
- Incumbent
- Assumed office 6 February 2024

Personal details
- Born: 1982 (age 43–44)
- Party: Narodna (until 2023); NPS (since 2023)

Uroš Đokić (Serbian Cyrillic: Урош Ђокић; born 11 November 1982) is a Serbian politician. He has served in the National Assembly of Serbia since February 2024 as a member of the People's Movement of Serbia (NPS).

== Early life and career ==
Đokić was born in Užice, in what was then the Socialist Republic of Serbia in the Socialist Federal Republic of Yugoslavia. He graduated from the University of Belgrade Faculty of Law and afterward passed the bar as a lawyer. He lives in Bajina Bašta.

== Politician ==
Đokić entered political life as a member of the People's Party (Narodna), which was part of the United for the Victory of Serbia (UZPS) coalition in 2022. He led the UZPS's electoral list for Bajina Bašta in the 2022 Serbian local elections and was elected when the list won nine mandates. The Serbian Progressive Party (SNS) and its allies won a majority victory in the municipality, and the UZPS delegates serve in opposition.

Đokić also appeared in the forty-ninth position on the UZPS's list in the 2022 Serbian parliamentary election, which was held concurrently with the local vote. The list won thirty-eight seats, and he was not elected.

The People's Party experienced a serious split in August 2023, and Đokić joined Miroslav Aleksić's breakaway People's Movement of Serbia.

=== Parliamentarian ===
The NPS participated in the Serbia Against Violence (SPN) coalition, a successor to the UZPS, in the 2023 parliamentary election. Đokić received the thirty-second position on the coalition's list and when elected when it won sixty-five mandates. The SNS and its allies won a majority victory, and he serves in opposition as a member of the NPS–New Face of Serbia (NLS) assembly group.

Đokić is a member of the committee on constitutional and legislative issues and a deputy member of the economy committee (Note: Formally known as the Committee on the Economy, Regional Development, Trade, Tourism, and Energy.) and the administrative committee. (Note: Formally known as the Committee on Administrative, Budgetary, Mandate, and Immunity Issues.) He is a vice-president of the NPS and as of 2024 he remains a member of the municipal assembly in Bajina Bašta.
