= Social Democratic Party (Serbia, 1992) =

Political party in Serbia

The Social Democratic Party (Serbian: Социјалдемократска партија, romanized: Socijaldemokratska Partija, abbr. SDP) was a short-lived political party in Serbia, established in July 1992 by disaffected parliamentarians from the governing Socialist Party of Serbia (SPS). It participated in the Serbian and Yugoslavian elections of December 1992. The party split in early 1993 into two rival factions, both of which apparently ceased to exist in 1994.

== History ==
=== Formation and 1992 elections ===
On 25 June 1992, a group of SPS parliamentarians led by Čedomir Mirković announced they were forming a new political movement. On July 14, the newspaper Borba reported that the SDP's initiative committee had been established with Mirković as its leader; other parliamentarians affiliated with the party included Ilija Rosić, Momčilo Trajković, Jovan Cvetković, Predrag Lazić, Rodoljub Todorović, and Milan Švabić (all from the SPS), as well as Miroslav Stojanović (who had not previously been a member of any party). The group was considered "reformist" in nature and offered support to Yugoslavian president Dobrica Ćosić and Yugoslavian prime minister Milan Panić, both of whom were rivals of Serbian president Slobodan Milošević.

On 11 November 1992, representatives of the Democratic Movement of Serbia (DEPOS), the Democratic Party (DS), the Civic Alliance of Serbia (GSS), and the SDP met to discuss the creation of a united opposition alliance, to be called the Democratic Coalition (DEKO). Mirković was an enthusiastic supporter of the initiative, describing the occasion of the meeting as "a crucial date in the creation of democracy." Plans for the united opposition broke down after only a few days, however, due to an ongoing rivalry between the DS and the leading party within DEPOS, the Serbian Renewal Movement (SPO).

The SDP contested the 1992 Serbian parliamentary election and the concurrent December 1992 Yugoslavian parliamentary election on its own and fared poorly, winning no seats in either contest. It had a small degree of success in the December 1992 Serbian local elections, winning representation in the Kosovo Polje municipal assembly and possibly in other jurisdictions.

=== Split and dissolution(s) ===
The SDP split into two factions, respectively led by Mirković and Momčilo Trajković, in early 1993. The split was predicated, in part, on differing approaches toward Serbian nationalism, with Mirković being more inclined toward the "civic" camp in Serbian politics and Trajković to the "national" camp.

In June 1993, Mirković's group adopted the name Social Democratic Party of the Centre (Socijaldemokratska partija Centra, SDP/C). The party merged into New Democracy (ND) in July 1994. Ironically, this brought Mirković back into the orbit of Milošević's regime, as New Democracy was by this time a junior partner in Serbia's coalition government.

Trajković's SDP contested the 1993 Serbian parliamentary election on its own and received only 5,959 votes (0.14%). Most of the party's limited support base was in the Priština constituency, where Trajković led the party's electoral list. The exact date of this faction's dissolution is not listed online, but by the end of 1994 Trajković had shifted his political focus to the Serbian Resistance Movement of Kosovo and Metohija.
