= Milan Glušac =

Serbian politician (born 1977)

- Милан Глушац

Mayor of Vrbas
- Incumbent
- Assumed office 11 July 2024
- Preceded by: Predrag Rojević
- In office 11 May 2017 – 24 February 2020
- Preceded by: himself (as provisional authority leader)
- Succeeded by: himself (as provisional authority leader)
- In office 14 July 2016 – 21 February 2017
- Preceded by: Bratislav Kažić
- Succeeded by: himself (as provisional authority leader)

Leader of the Vrbas Provisional Authority
- In office 24 February 2020 – 21 August 2020
- Preceded by: himself (as mayor)
- Succeeded by: Predrag Rojević
- In office 21 February 2017 – 11 May 2017
- Preceded by: himself (as mayor)
- Succeeded by: himself (as mayor)

Member of the National Assembly of the Republic of Serbia
- In office 26 October 2022 – 6 February 2024

Personal details
- Born: 27 November 1977 (age 48) Vrbas, SAP Vojvodina, SR Serbia, SFR Yugoslavia
- Party: SNS (since 2009)

Milan Glušac (Serbian Cyrillic: Милан Глушац; born 27 November 1977) is a Serbian politician. He is currently serving his third term as mayor of Vrbas and was a member of the Serbian national assembly from 2022 to 2024. Glušac is a member of the Serbian Progressive Party (SNS) since 2009.

== Early life and career ==
Glušac was born in Vrbas, in what was then the Socialist Autonomous Province of Vojvodina in the Socialist Republic of Serbia, Socialist Federal Republic of Yugoslavia. He was raised in the community, attended the Faculty of Economics at the University of Novi Sad, and has the title of master of engineering in management.

He began working as spokesperson and chief-of-staff for the mayor of Vrbas in 2003. He later chaired the board of directors for the public company Vrbas from 2004 to 2008, was deputy head of the municipality's economy department from 2008 to 2009, and was appointed to oversee the office of the control inspector in the department of local public revenues in 2009.

== Politician ==
=== Early candidacies ===
Glušac appeared in the fourteenth position on the Progressive Party's electoral list for Vrbas in a special off-year municipal election in 2009. The list won six seats, finishing third, and he did not receive an assembly mandate.

He appeared in the twenty-third position on the Progressive Party's list in the 2012 Vojvodina provincial election, which was held under a system of mixed proportional representation. The Progressives won fourteen proportional seats, and he was not elected.

=== First terms as mayor ===
Glušac was given the second position on the Progressive Party's list for Vrbas in the 2013 local elections and was elected when the list won eighteen out of thirty-six seats. The Progressives formed a local coalition government with the Socialist Party of Serbia (SPS) after the election. Bratislav Kažić of the Progressives was chosen as the municipality's mayor, and Glušac became deputy mayor.

Kažić resigned as mayor on 14 July 2016, and Glušac was chosen by the municipal assembly as his replacement. Shortly thereafter, he was profiled by the journal Vreme for supporting a comprehensive program of energy efficiency in the community.

Glušac's first mayoral term was relatively brief. He announced his resignation in January 2017 in order to harmonize the municipal's upcoming municipal election with the 2017 Serbian presidential election. His resignation became official on 21 February 2017, and he was appointed to lead a provisional administration on the same day.

Glušac led the SNS's list for Vrbas in the 2017 local elections and was re-elected when the list won seventeen seats. The Progressives and Socialists continued their alliance after the election, and he was chosen for a second term as mayor on 11 May 2017.

He resigned as mayor again in late 2019, and his resignation became official on 24 February 2020. It was understood that this was done to ensure Vrbas's next municipal election would be harmonized with Serbia's main local election cycle. He was once again appointed as the leader of a provisional government.

Glušac again led the Progressive Party's list for Vrbas in the 2020 local elections (which were delayed due to the COVID-19 pandemic) and was re-elected when the list won a majority victory with twenty-two seats. He did not return to the mayor's office afterward; Predrag Rojević was chosen as the municipality's new mayor on 21 August 2020, and Glušac, after a gap of four years, was chosen for his second term as deputy mayor. He resigned from this role on 18 May 2021 and returned as a member of the municipal assembly on 30 June.

=== Parliamentarian ===
Glušac appeared in the 130th position on the Progressive Party's list in the 2022 Serbian parliamentary election. The list won a plurality victory with 120 seats out of 250; he was not immediately elected but received a mandate on 26 October 2022 as the replacement for another SNS delegate. The Progressives continued to dominate Serbia's coalition government after the election, and Glušac served as a supporter of the ministry. He was a member of the environmental protection committee and a deputy member of the committee on constitutional and legislative issues, the defence and internal affairs committee, the committee on the diaspora and Serbs in the region, and the European Union–Serbia stabilization and association committee. He was also the leader of Serbia's parliamentary friendship group with Malawi.

He was given the 146th position on the SNS's list in the 2023 parliamentary election and was not re-elected when the list won a majority victory with 129 seats. His parliamentary term ended when the new assembly convened in February 2024. It is possible that he will have the opportunity to return to parliament before the next election as the replacement for another party delegate.

=== Return to the mayor's office ===
Glušac appeared in the third position on the SNS's list for Vrbas in the 2024 Serbian local elections and was re-elected to the municipal assembly when the list won a majority victory with twenty-three seats. He was chosen for a third term as mayor on 11 July 2024.
