= Snežana Sedlar =

Serbian politician

Snežana Sedlar (Serbian Cyrillic: Снежана Седлар; born 16 August 1960), formerly known as Snežana Sedlar Kenig, is a Serbian politician. She has served in the Assembly of Vojvodina since 2016 as a member of the Serbian Progressive Party. She was previously a member of the National Assembly of Serbia from 2008 to 2012 as a member of G17 Plus.

== Early life and career ==
Sedlar was born in Odžaci, Autonomous Province of Vojvodina, in what was then the People's Republic of Serbia in the People's Federal Republic of Yugoslavia. She graduated from the University of Novi Sad's Faculty of Law in 1983 and has worked for the chemical industry HIPOL in Odžaci and for the National Employment Service in Novi Sad.

== Politician ==
=== Member of the National Assembly ===
Sedlar received the 202nd position on the electoral list of G17 Plus in the 2007 Serbian parliamentary election. The list won nineteen seats, and she was not awarded a mandate. (From 2000 to 2011, parliamentary mandates in Serbian elections were awarded at the discretion of successful parties or alliances, and it was common practice for mandates to be assigned out of numerical order. Sedlar's position on the list – which was in any event mostly alphabetical – had no bearing on whether or not she received a mandate.)

G17 Plus contested the 2008 parliamentary election as part of the Democratic Party's For a European Serbia list, and Sedlar received the 191st position. She was not initially awarded a mandate, but she was able to enter the assembly as the replacement for another party member on 16 July 2008, after G17 Plus entered the government of Serbia. She served in the assembly as a supporter of the administration for the next four years. In May 2010, she was elected to the presidency of G17 Plus in Vojvodina.

Serbia's electoral system was reformed in 2011, such that mandates were awarded to candidates on successful lists in numerical order. G17 Plus contested the 2012 parliamentary election as part of the United Regions of Serbia alliance, and Sedlar received the fifty-first position on their list. The United Regions of Serbia won sixteen mandates, and she was not returned. She subsequently left G17 Plus and joined the Progressive Party.

=== Municipal politics ===
Sedlar has served a number of terms in the Odžaci municipal assembly. In 2011, she chosen as speaker of the assembly. She was given the third position on the Progressive Party's list for Odžaci in the 2013 Serbian local elections and was re-elected when the list won sixteen mandates. She did not seek re-election in 2017.

=== Assembly of Vojvodina ===
Sedlar contested the 2012 Vojvodina provincial election as a United Regions of Serbia candidate in the Odžaci constituency and was defeated.

Vojvodina switched to a system of full proportional representation for the 2016 provincial election. Sedlar received the thirteenth position on the Progressive Party's list and was elected when the list won a majority victory with sixty-three mandates. She was chosen as a vice-president of the assembly following the election and held this role for the next four years. She was also appointed as director of the provincial employment service of Serbia's National Employment Service on 8 July 2017.

She was promoted to the third position on the Progressive list for the 2020 provincial election and was elected to a second term when the list won an increased majority with seventy-six seats. She is now a member of the assembly committee on regulations and the committee on economy.

== Electoral record ==
=== Provincial (Vojvodina) ===
2012 Vojvodina assembly election Odžaci (constituency seat) - First and Second Rounds
Predrag Cvetanović	Choice for a Better Vojvodina–Bojan Pajtić (Affiliation: Democratic Party)	3,094	20.61	7,199	57.40
Đorđe Bogdanović	Socialist Party of Serbia (SPS), Party of United Pensioners of Serbia (PUPS), United Serbia (JS), Social Democratic Party of Serbia (SDP Serbia)	3,668	24.43	5,962	45.30
Nikola Stamenković	Let's Get Vojvodina Moving–Tomislav Nikolić (Serbian Progressive Party, New Serbia, Movement of Socialists, Strength of Serbia Movement)	2,973	19.80		
Dobrislav Prelić	Serbian Radical Party	1,562	10.40		
Snežana Sedlar	United Regions of Serbia–Snežana Sedlar	1,444	9.62		
Goran Lazarević	Democratic Party of Serbia	1,077	7.17		
Vensa Gorač	"Čedomir Jovanović–Vojvodina U-Turn (LDP–SPO–VP–SDU–Rich Serbia)"	816	5.44		
Viktor Hajnal	Alliance of Vojvodina Hungarians	379	2.52		
Total valid votes		15,013	100	13,161	100
