= 2010 Serbian local elections =

A small number of municipalities in Serbia held local elections in 2010. These were not part of the country's regular cycle of local elections but were instead held in certain jurisdictions where either the local government had fallen or the last local elections for four-year terms had taken place in 2006.

All local elections in 2010 were held under proportional representation. The Mayors were not directly elected but were instead chosen by elected members of the local assemblies. Parties were required to cross a five percent electoral threshold (of all votes, not only of valid votes), although this requirement was waived for parties representing national minority communities.

== Results ==
=== Vojvodina ===
==== Odžaci ====
Local elections were held in Odžaci on 24 January 2010. The local assembly had become dysfunctional in the previous sitting, after the Socialist Party of Serbia withdrew its support from an administration led by the Serbian Radical Party. Veroljub Marković of the Democratic Party led a provisional administration prior to the vote.

Party	Votes	%	Seats
For a European Odžaci–Boris Tadić (Democratic Party, Serbian Renewal Movement, Liberal Democratic Party)	6,950	35.21	10
Serbian Progressive Party–Tomislav Nikolić	4,425	22.42	7
Socialist Party of Serbia–Party of United Pensioners of Serbia–United Serbia–Ivica Dačić	2,195	11.12	3
Serbian Radical Party–Dr. Vojislav Šešelj	1,990	10.08	3
Democratic Party of Serbia–Vojislav Koštunica	1,869	9.47	2
G17 Plus	1,219	6.18	1
Roma Democratic Party (Romska Demokratska Stranka)–Ranko Jovanović	716	3.63	1
People's Party–Maja Gojković	162	0.82	–
New Serbia–Velimir Ilić	114	0.58	–
Coalition Serbia: Roma Democratic Party (Romska Demokratska Partija), Vlachs Democratic Party of Serbia, Rusyn Democratic Party	96	0.49	–
Total	19,736	100.00	27
Valid votes	19,736	97.94	
Invalid/blank votes	415	2.06	
Total votes	20,151	100.00	
Registered voters/turnout	27,996	71.98	

Predrag Cvetanović of the Democratic Party was chosen as mayor after the election. He stood down in 2012 after being elected to the Assembly of Vojvodina and was replaced by Izabela Serić from the same party.

=== Central Serbia ===
==== Aranđelovac ====
Elections were held in Aranđelovac on 25 April 2010, with repeat voting in some communities on 2 May 2010. The municipality's previous mayor, Radosav Švabić of the Serbian Radical Party, had been arrested in June 2009, and the assembly had not sat for several months before the local government was dissolved in November. Vlada Gajić of the Democratic Party led a provisional administration prior to the vote.

Party	Votes	%	Seats
Serbian Progressive Party–Tomislav Nikolić	6,359	25.76	12
Democratic Party–Boris Tadić	5,241	21.23	10
Socialist Party of Serbia–Party of United Pensioners of Serbia–United Serbia–Ivica Dačić	3,621	14.67	6
Together for Aranđelovac–G17 Plus–Social Democratic Party of Serbia–Together for Šumadija–Dr. Aleksandar Damjanić	1,815	7.35	3
New Serbia–Velimir Ilić	1,795	7.27	3
Democratic Party of Serbia–Vojislav Koštunica	1,597	6.47	3
Liberal Democratic Party–Čedomir Jovanović	1,367	5.54	2
Serbian Radical Party–Dr. Vojislav Šešelj	1,306	5.29	2
Serbian Renewal Movement–Vuk Drašković	832	3.37	–
Citizens' Group: Let Get Aranđelovac Moving–Slobodan Đaković	575	2.33	–
Citizens' Group: Aranđelovac in Belgrade–Movement for the Development of Serbia	181	0.73	–
Total	24,689	100.00	41
Valid votes	24,689	97.48	
Invalid/blank votes	639	2.52	
Total votes	25,328	100.00	
Registered voters/turnout	38,784	65.31	

Vlada Gajić of the Democratic Party was confirmed as mayor after the election. He was replaced by Bojan Radović of the Progressive Party in August 2012.

The leader of the "Aranđelovac in Belgrade–Movement for the Development of Serbia" list was Zoran Zečević, who would later be elected to the national assembly as a member of the far-right Serbian Party Oathkeepers.
