= Serbian Left (2022) =

Political party in Serbia

Serbian Left Српска левица
- Abbreviation: SL
- President: Vacant
- Honorary president: Joška Broz (until 2025)
- Co-founders: Radoslav Milojičić; Joška Broz
- Founded: 23 January 2022
- Preceded by: Communist Party
- Colours: Red; Blue; White
- National Assembly: 0 / 250
- Assembly of Vojvodina: 0 / 120

Website
- srpskalevica.org

The Serbian Left (Serbian: Српска левица, Srpska levica, abbr. SL) is a political party in Serbia. It was established in January 2022, as a direct successor of the Communist Party, an unofficial descendant of the former League of Communists of Serbia.

== History ==
The Serbian Left (SL) was formed in January 2022 as a successor to the Communist Party.

It planned to contest the 2022 Serbian parliamentary election, but it ultimately did not. According to Milojičić, the party is in opposition to the Aleksandar Vučić and Serbian Progressive Party (SNS)-led government, although Broz still served in the Socialist Party of Serbia parliamentary group after SL was formed. For the 2023 Serbian parliamentary election, SL participated on the SNS electoral list and gained one seat in the National Assembly.

In June 2024, Milojičić resigned as the party president and joined SNS.

== Organisation ==
Its leader until 2024 was Radoslav Milojičić, former Democratic Party member of the National Assembly, while its honorary president is Joška Broz, former leader of the Communist Party.

== Electoral performance ==
=== Parliamentary elections ===
National Assembly of Serbia
Year	Leader	Popular vote	% of popular vote	#	# of seats	Seat change	Coalition	Status	Ref.
2022	Radoslav Milojičić	Did not participate			0 / 250	▼1	–	Extra-parliamentary	–
2023	Radoslav Milojičić	1,783,701	48.07%	▲1st	1 / 250	▲1	SNSDS	Support	
