= 2022 Serbian local elections =

- 3 April 2022
- Results of the local elections

Local elections in Serbia were held on 3 April 2022 in the municipalities of Aranđelovac, Bajina Bašta, Belgrade, Bor, Doljevac, Kladovo, Knjaževac, Kula, Lučani, Majdanpek, Medveđa, Sečanj, Sevojno (a municipality in the city of Užice), and Smederevska Palanka. Alongside the local elections, national-level general elections were held simultaneously on the same day.

Seven ballot lists appeared in the election in Aranđelovac, while nine ballot lists appeared in Bajina Bašta. In Belgrade, there were twelve ballot lists in total; the Serbian Progressive Party (SNS) nominated Aleksandar Šapić as their mayoral candidate, while the major opposition United for the Victory of Serbia (UZPS) coalition nominated Vladeta Janković. In Bor, eleven ballot lists were present in total while parties inside the UZPS coalition ran on two separate ballot lists. Four ballot lists were present in the election in Doljevac, with no opposition parties taking part in the local election. In Kladovo, five lists appeared on the ballot, while in Knjaževac there were eight lists in total. The UZPS coalition also ran on two separate lists in Kula, where the leader of a civic group claimed that bribery occurred during the collection of signatures. Five ballot lists appeared in the election in Lučani and seven in Majdanpek, where electoral irregularities were reported at voting stations. Seven ballot lists appeared in the election in Medveđa, while in Sečanj there were four lists on the ballot. In Sevojno, six lists appeared on the ballot, while in Smederevska Palanka there were seven lists in total, with the UZPS coalition again running on two separate lists.

SNS won the most votes in all local elections. In Belgrade, the election was repeated at five voting stations on 16 April and again on 21 April due to the UZPS coalition and Social Democratic Party (SDS) objecting the results at those polling stations. SDS did not manage to cross the threshold after the repeat elections, and in June, Šapić was elected mayor of Belgrade.

== Background ==
Previous local elections in Serbia were held in March and October 2021, in which the ruling Serbian Progressive Party (SNS) won a majority of seats in most of the municipalities. Electoral irregularities had occurred at voting stations, and there had also been physical attacks on opposition activists. Dialogues between the opposition and ruling parties regarding electoral conditions were held from May to October 2021. The two groups signed a document on 29 October, which included changes to the required minimum of collected signatures for minority ballots and changes to the composition of the Regulatory Body of Electronic Media (REM) and Republic Electoral Commission (RIK). The environmental protests, which began in September 2021, grew in size due to the adoption of modifications to the law on referendum and people's initiative and the expropriation law in November 2021. The modifications to the law on referendums and people's initiatives abolished the 50% threshold that was needed for referendums to pass into law. The protests lasted until February 2022. In Belgrade, the protests helped the We Must coalition to gain more support in opinion polls. A constitutional referendum regarding the judiciary also took place in January 2022, in which the "yes" option, which was supported by the government, prevailed over the "no" option, although the turnout was reported to be at 30 per cent.

== Electoral system ==
Local elections in Serbia are held under a proportional representation system. Eligible voters vote for electoral lists, on which the registered candidates are present. An electoral list could be submitted by a registered political party, a coalition of political parties, or a citizens' group. The number of valid signatures needed to be collected to take part in the election varies by the number of eligible voters in that municipality. At least 40 percent of candidates on electoral lists must be female. The electoral list is submitted by its chosen ballot representative, who does not have to be present on its electoral list. An electoral list could be declined, after which those who had submitted can fix the deficiencies in a span of 48 hours, or rejected, if the person is not authorised to nominate candidates. The name and date of the election, the names of the electoral lists and its ballot representatives, and information on how to vote are only present on the voting ballot.

Local electoral commissions and polling boards oversee the election. Seats are allocated with an electoral threshold of 3 percent of all votes cast, however if no electoral list wins 3 percent of all votes cast, then all electoral lists that received votes can participate in the distribution of seats. The seats are distributed by electoral lists in proportion to the number of votes received, while the number of seats belonging to electoral lists is determined by applying the highest quotient system. The seats are distributed by dividing the total number of votes received by the electoral list participating in the distribution of seats by each number from one to the number of councilors the local assembly has. The obtained quotients are classified by size so that the electoral list has as many mandates as it has its quotients among the highest quotients of all the electoral lists participating in the distribution. If two or more electoral lists receive the same quotients on the basis of which the seat is distributed, the electoral list that received the greater number of votes has priority. The seats in the local assemblies are awarded to the candidates to their order on the electoral list, starting with the first candidate from an electoral list. When the councilors of a local assembly are sworn in, they in turn elect the mayor.

An electoral list could be declared the status of an ethnic minority electoral list by the local electoral commission. An ethnic minority electoral list could be only submitted by a registered political party or a coalition of political parties of an ethnic minority. If the percentage of the members of that ethnic minority is less than 50% in that municipality, an electoral list could be then granted the status of an ethnic minority electoral list. If the electoral list receives less than the 3 percent electoral threshold of all votes cast, it would still take part in the distribution of seats. When the distribution of seats takes place, the quotients of ethnic minority electoral lists that won less than 3 percent of the votes are increased by 35 percent.

Any local election, whether it is a municipal or a local assembly election, is called by the president of the National Assembly, who also has to announce its date. To vote, a person has to be a citizen and resident of Serbia and at least 18 years old. A voter could only vote in the municipality of their residence. Election silence begins two days before the scheduled election, during which time no opinion polls, presentation of candidates and their programmes, or invitation to vote in the election could take place.

== Results and campaign ==
Ivica Dačić, the president of the National Assembly, called the local elections on 15 February, and shortly afterwards Aleksandar Vučić, the president of Serbia, dissolved the National Assembly, after which the official electoral campaign began. Dačić announced that local elections would be held in the municipalities of Aranđelovac, Bajina Bašta, Belgrade, Bor, Doljevac, Kladovo, Knjaževac, Kula, Lučani, Majdanpek, Medveđa, Sečanj, Sevojno, and Smederevska Palanka. The 2022 general election occurred simultaneously on 3 April.

=== Aranđelovac ===
An election was held for the Municipal Assembly of Aranđelovac due to the expiry of the term of the previous assembly elected in 2018.

On 16 February, SNS submitted their ballot list for the election, and a day later, the Serbian Party Oathkeepers (SSZ) submitted their ballot list. The Socialist Party of Serbia (SPS)–United Serbia (JS) coalition submitted their ballot on 18 February. POKS submitted its list on 21 February, while the Dveri–Healthy Serbia (ZS) coalition submitted its ballot later that day. The United for the Victory of Serbia (UZPS) coalition list and Enough is Enough (DJB) list were later confirmed by the City Election Commission. During the campaign period, SNS youth representatives launched an initiative to landscape the area near a local railway station. SPS representatives signed an agreement with the Greens of Serbia on 25 February, which formalised their coalition in Aranđelovac.

In the municipality of Aranđelovac, there were 36,847 eligible citizens that were able to vote in the local election. The local City Election Commission reported that the turnout was 63%. The Serbian Progressive Party won 19 seats, while the SPS–JS coalition won seven. The Serbian Party Oathkeepers won 5 seats, while the United for the Victory of Serbia coalition won four, and the Dveri–ZS coalition won three seats. Two seats were won by POKS, while the Enough is Enough party won one.

| Party | Votes | % | Seats |
|---|---|---|---|
| Aleksandar Vučić–Together We Can Do Everything (Serbian Progressive Party) | 10,038 | 43.58 | 19 |
| Ivica Dačić–Prime Minister of Serbia (Socialist Party of Serbia, United Serbia) | 3,926 | 17.04 | 7 |
| Milica Đurđević Stamenkovski–Serbian Party Oathkeepers | 2,786 | 12.10 | 5 |
| United Aranđelovac–Democratic Party–People's Party–Party of Freedom and Justice | 2,130 | 9.25 | 4 |
| Coalition With the People–Serbian Movement Dveri–Healthy Serbia–To Win for Our Home Aranđelovac–Milan Švabić | 1,921 | 8.34 | 3 |
| Movement for the Restoration of the Kingdom of Serbia (POKS)–Radiša Pavlović | 1,224 | 5.31 | 2 |
| "Sovereignists"–Saša Radulović (DJB), Dr. Jovana Stojković (ŽZS) (Enough is Enough) | 1,009 | 4.38 | 1 |
| Total | 23,034 | 100.00 | 41 |
| Valid votes | 23,034 | 96.76 | |
| Invalid/blank votes | 772 | 3.24 | |
| Total votes | 23,806 | 100.00 | |
| Registered voters/turnout | 36,847 | 64.61 | |
Source: RIK

Incumbent mayor Bojan Radović of the Serbian Progressive Party was confirmed for another term in office after the election.

Zoran Zečević appeared in the seventh position on the list of the Serbian Party Oathkeepers and was not immediately elected. He received a mandate on 22 July 2024 as the replacement for another party delegate.

=== Bajina Bašta ===
Incumbent mayor Vesna Đurić of the Serbian Progressive Party resigned in January 2022 in order to prompt a new local election. She was appointed afterward as the leader of a provisional administration.

The SNS-led coalition submitted their ballot list on 17 February, while the SPS–JS coalition submitted its ballot on 23 February. The Social Democratic Party (SDS) submitted its ballot list on 8 March, and on the same day, the People's Party (NS) and Democratic Party (DS) had also submitted their list under the "United for Victory" banner. ZS had also submitted their list on 12 March, and a day later, the National Democratic Alternative (NADA) list was confirmed. The civic group "Loud and Clear", which was led by Vladislav Biljić, submitted their ballot on 13 March. A day later, the City Election Commission confirmed the Alliance 90/Greens of Serbia list.

In the municipality of Bajina Bašta, there were 21,733 eligible citizens that were able to vote in the local election. The local City Election Commission reported that the turnout was 68%. The coalition led by the Serbian Progressive Party won 24 seats, while the United for the Victory of Serbia coalition won 9 seats. The SPS–JS coalition won six seats, and it is followed by the Healthy Serbia which won three seats, the Social Democratic Party which won two seats, and Dveri, which won one seat. NS had claimed that they allegedly stopped electoral fraud from taking place at voting stations.

| Party | Votes | % | Seats |
|---|---|---|---|
| Aleksandar Vučić–Together We Can Do Everything (Serbian Progressive Party, Serbian Radical Party, Party of United Pensioners of Serbia, Serbian People's Party, Movement of Socialists, Social Democratic Party of Serbia) | 6,700 | 47.15 | 24 |
| Uroš Đokić–United for the Victory of Bajina Bašta (People's Party, Democratic Party) | 2,712 | 19.08 | 9 |
| Ivica Dačić–Prime Minister of Serbia (Socialist Party of Serbia, United Serbia) | 1,707 | 12.01 | 6 |
| Milan Stamatović–May Health Prevail Zoran Jugović (Healthy Serbia) | 1,056 | 7.43 | 3 |
| Mihajlo Marković–Come on People–Social Democratic Party | 691 | 4.86 | 2 |
| Serbian Movement Dveri–Heart for Bajina Bašta | 445 | 3.13 | 1 |
| Citizens' Group: Loud and Clear for Bajina Bašta–Vladislav Biljić | 415 | 2.92 | – |
| Dr. Miloš Jovanović–Hope for Bajina Bašta–Serbian Coalition NADA–National Democratic Alternative–Democratic Party of Serbia (DSS)—For the Kingdom of Serbia (Monarchists)–Vojislav Mihailović | 405 | 2.85 | – |
| Alliance 90/Greens of Serbia | 80 | 0.56 | – |
| Total | 14,211 | 100.00 | 45 |
| Valid votes | 14,211 | 96.17 | |
| Invalid/blank votes | 566 | 3.83 | |
| Total votes | 14,777 | 100.00 | |
| Registered voters/turnout | 21,733 | 67.99 | |
Source: RIK

Incumbent mayor Vesna Đurić was chosen for another term after the election. She resigned in October 2024 and was replaced by Milenko Ordagić, also of the Progressives.

Uroš Đokić of the People's Party was elected to the assembly from the lead position on the United for the Victory of Bajina Bašta list.

=== Belgrade ===
The City of Belgrade announced that the SNS–led coalition, SPS–led coalition, Serbian Radical Party (SRS), SSZ, UZPS, NADA, We Must (Moramo), SDS–led coalition, Love, Faith, Hope (LJVN), Sovereignists, Dveri, and the Russian Minority Alliance would take part in the local election. SNS nominated Aleksandar Šapić as their mayoral candidate, while UZPS nominated Vladeta Janković.

In Belgrade, preliminary results were published a day after the elections, although due to objections that were made by UZPS and SDS the election was repeated at five voting stations on 16 April and again on 21 April. Final results were published on 9 May. Opposition parties had managed to win more votes than the governing parties, although SDS remained below the threshold. Opposition parties suggested that the next election might be called earlier. Šapić was shortly after elected as mayor of Belgrade.

| Party | Votes | % | Seats |
|---|---|---|---|
| Together We Can Do Everything | 348,345 | 38.83 | 48 |
| United for the Victory of Belgrade | 195,335 | 21.78 | 26 |
| We Must | 99,078 | 11.04 | 13 |
| SPS–JS–ZS | 64,050 | 7.14 | 8 |
| National Democratic Alternative | 57,760 | 6.44 | 7 |
| Serbian Party Oathkeepers | 32,029 | 3.57 | 4 |
| Dveri–POKS | 30,898 | 3.44 | 4 |
| Social Democratic Party–Nova | 26,219 | 2.92 | 0 |
| Sovereignists | 19,544 | 2.18 | 0 |
| Serbian Radical Party | 14,674 | 1.64 | 0 |
| Nemanja Šarović — For the Whole Normal World | 5,239 | 0.58 | 0 |
| SRP–SRPV–PGS | 3,879 | 0.43 | 0 |
| Total | 897,050 | 100.00 | 110 |
| Valid votes | 897,050 | 97.91 | |
| Invalid/blank votes | 19,155 | 2.09 | |
| Total votes | 916,205 | 100.00 | |
| Registered voters/turnout | 1,600,462 | 57.25 | |
Source: City of Belgrade

=== Bor ===
The Bor City Election Commission (GIK) proclaimed the ballot list led by SNS on 16 February. A day later, the Party of Freedom and Justice (SSP) held a conference during which the party presented a coalition with the Movement of Free Citizens (PSG), Vlach Party, and Regional Development Initiative of East Serbia, and the coalition appointed Ljubiša Stamenković, an independent politician, as their ballot representative. The SPS–JS coalition presented its ballot on 18 February, while the Vlach Party "Bridge" announced that they will contest the local election by themselves. GIK proclaimed the Dveri–POKS ballot list on 19 February, and the coalition led by the NS on 20 February. The Sovereignists coalition, which was led by the Enough is Enough party, submitted its ballot on 25 February. In Bor, JS decided to not participate in a coalition with SPS and its ballot was submitted on 4 March. Two civic groups, the "Loud for the Youth" and "Fighters for Bor", submitted their ballots on 7 March. The Serbian Radical Party (SRS) and Russian Party (RS) had also announced their participation in the election; SRS managed to submit its list before the deadline.

During the campaign, the NS–led coalition stated its support for building new hospitals and its opposition to exploitation of natural resources. The Vlach Party "Bridge" representatives proposed that salaries at the Serbia Zijin Bor Copper, a copper mining complex, should be increased instead, while SRS stated its support for exploitation. A poll was conducted in early February, in which the majority of respondents stated that the local government in Bor should change. SNS received its support from the Social Democratic Party of Serbia (SDPS) and the Movement of Vlachs of Serbia (PVS). The "Loud for Youth" civic group campaigned mainly on youth politics.

In the municipality of Bor, there were 40,661 eligible citizens that were able to vote in the local election. The local City Election Commission stated that the turnout was 61.2%. The Serbian Progressive Party won 15 seats, while the coalition led by the People's Party won 6 seats. The Socialist Party of Serbia and Vlach Party "Bridge" both won four seats, while the coalition led by the Party of Freedom and Justice won three seats. The Dveri–POKS coalition, Fighters for Bor, and Loud for the Youth each won one seat.

| Party | Votes | % | Seats |
|---|---|---|---|
| Serbian Progressive Party | 8,794 | 36.44 | 15 |
| Narodna–DS–VNS–ZZS–BSP | 3,802 | 15.76 | 6 |
| Socialist Party of Serbia | 2,677 | 11.09 | 4 |
| Vlach Party "Bridge" | 2,447 | 10.14 | 4 |
| SSP–PSG–VS–RIRI | 2,238 | 9.27 | 3 |
| Dveri–POKS | 1,017 | 4.21 | 1 |
| Loud for the Youth | 876 | 3.63 | 1 |
| Fighters for Bor | 774 | 3.21 | 1 |
| Enough is Enough | 699 | 2.90 | 0 |
| United Serbia | 490 | 2.03 | 0 |
| Serbian Radical Party | 316 | 1.31 | 0 |
| Total | 24,130 | 100.00 | 35 |
| Registered voters/turnout | 40,661 | 61.20 | |
Source: RIK

=== Doljevac ===
Doljevac's regular municipal elections were scheduled for December 2022. Incumbent mayor Goran Ljubić of the Serbian Progressive Party resigned in January 2022 in order to harmonize them with Serbia's parliamentary vote and the other municipal elections. He was appointed as leader of a provisional authority.

The City Election Commission in Doljevac had confirmed four ballot lists in total, which were SNS, SPS, JS, and SRS. It was noted that opposition parties would not take part in the local election in Doljevac. In the municipality of Doljevac, there were 13,940 eligible citizens that were able to vote in the local election. The local City Election Commission reported that the turnout is reported to be at 78%. The Serbian Progressive Party won a supermajority of 30 seats, while the Socialist Party of Serbia and United Serbia have each won three seats, while the Serbian Radical Party only won one seat.

| Party | Votes | % | Seats |
|---|---|---|---|
| Aleksandar Vučić–Together We Can Do Everything (Serbian Progressive Party) | 8,271 | 79.89 | 30 |
| United Serbia–Dragan Marković Palma–At Home! | 871 | 8.41 | 3 |
| Ivica Dačić–Prime Minister of Serbia (Socialist Party of Serbia) | 857 | 8.28 | 3 |
| Dr. Vojislav Šešelj–Serbian Radical Party | 354 | 3.42 | 1 |
| Total | 10,353 | 100.00 | 37 |
| Valid votes | 10,353 | 95.24 | |
| Invalid/blank votes | 518 | 4.76 | |
| Total votes | 10,871 | 100.00 | |
| Registered voters/turnout | 13,940 | 77.98 | |
Source: RIK

Goran Ljubić was confirmed for another term as mayor after the election.

Ljubić again resigned as mayor on 30 October 2023 to prompt a new election later in the year and was appointed as president of a provisional authority.

=== Kladovo ===
The SNS list was confirmed by the City Election Commission on 16 February, while the SPS list was confirmed two days later. On 4 March, the Vlach National Party ballot list was confirmed. A civic group named "Movement for Kladovo – dr Borislav Petrović" also announced its participation in the election, and its list was confirmed by the City Election Commission on 11 March. A ballot list led by SRS was confirmed before the deadline.

In the municipality of Kladovo, there were 21,668 eligible citizens that were able to vote in the local election. The local City Election Commission stated that the turnout was 52%. The Serbian Progressive Party won 14 seats and followed by them, the Movement for Kladovo won 9 seats, and the Socialist Party of Serbia won 5 seats.

| Party | Votes | % | Seats |
|---|---|---|---|
| Serbian Progressive Party | 5,063 | 47.03 | 14 |
| Movement for Kladovo | 3,293 | 30.59 | 9 |
| Socialist Party of Serbia | 2,086 | 19.38 | 5 |
| Vlach National Party | 207 | 1.92 | 0 |
| Serbian Radical Party | 117 | 1.09 | 0 |
| Total | 10,766 | 100.00 | 28 |
| Valid votes | 10,766 | 95.52 | |
| Invalid/blank votes | 505 | 4.48 | |
| Total votes | 11,271 | 100.00 | |
| Registered voters/turnout | 21,668 | 52.02 | |
Source: RIK

=== Knjaževac ===
In Knjaževac, the local City Election Commission confirmed the SNS ballot list on 16 February, while the SPS list was confirmed on 19 February. The NADA ballot list was confirmed on 1 March, while the UZPS coalition and SRS ballot lists were confirmed a day later. The Dveri–POKS coalition submitted its ballot on 3 March, and it was confirmed by the City Election Commission on the same day. The City Election Commission also confirmed ballot lists that were submitted by the Serbian People's Party (SNP) and JS.

In the municipality of Knjaževac, there were 23,638 eligible citizens that were able to vote in the local election. The local City Election Commission reported that the turnout was 63%. The Serbian Progressive Party won 27 seats and followed by them, the Socialist Party of Serbia won 6 seats, the United for the Victory of Serbia coalition won 4 seats, the Dveri–POKS coalition won two seats, and the National Democratic Alternative won one seat.

| Party | Votes | % | Seats |
|---|---|---|---|
| Serbian Progressive Party | 8,711 | 61.25 | 27 |
| Socialist Party of Serbia | 1,878 | 13.20 | 6 |
| United for the Victory of Serbia | 1,383 | 9.72 | 4 |
| Dveri–POKS | 650 | 4.57 | 2 |
| National Democratic Alternative | 539 | 3.79 | 1 |
| Serbian People's Party | 425 | 2.99 | 0 |
| Serbian Radical Party | 421 | 2.96 | 0 |
| United Serbia | 216 | 1.52 | 0 |
| Total | 14,223 | 100.00 | 40 |
| Valid votes | 14,223 | 95.72 | |
| Invalid/blank votes | 636 | 4.28 | |
| Total votes | 14,859 | 100.00 | |
| Registered voters/turnout | 23,638 | 62.86 | |
Source: RIK

=== Kula ===
Kula's regular municipal elections were scheduled for December 2022. Incumbent mayor Damjan Miljanić of the Serbian Progressive Party resigned in January 2022 in order to harmonize them with Serbia's parliamentary vote and the other municipal elections. He was appointed afterward as leader of a provisional authority.

SNS submitted its list on 16 February. SPS and Community of Serbs submitted their list shortly after. A coalition list made up of DJB, NS, and RS was formed, and its ballot list was confirmed by 14 March, including SRS and a civic group named "Residents of Kula and Our City". Zlatko Ostojić, the leader of the civic group "Residents of Kula and Our City", had claimed that two ballot lists were submitted in an illegal way, and that bribery took place during the collection of signatures.

In the municipality of Kula, there were 34,198 eligible citizens that were able to vote in the local election. The local City Election Commission reported that the turnout was 65%. The Serbian Progressive Party won 21 seats and followed by them, Critical Mass–For Victory and Residents of Kula and Our City each won five seats, Community of Serbs and Socialist Party of Serbia have each won three seats, and the coalition led by the People's Party won two seats.

| Party | Votes | % | Seats |
|---|---|---|---|
| Aleksandar Vučić–Together We Can Do Everything (Serbian Progressive Party, Alliance of Vojvodina Hungarians, Movement of Socialists, Social Democratic Party of Serbia) | 11,161 | 52.06 | 21 |
| Citizens' Group: Critical Mass–For Victory | 2,506 | 11.69 | 4 |
| Residents of Kula and Our City–United for the Victory of Kula | 2,219 | 10.35 | 4 |
| Community of Serbs | 1,848 | 8.62 | 3 |
| Ivica Dačić–Prime Minister of Serbia (Socialist Party of Serbia) | 1,788 | 8.34 | 3 |
| Enough Is Enough-"Sovereignists", People's Party and Russian Party–Dušan Hajduković | 1,327 | 6.19 | 2 |
| Serbian Radical Party | 590 | 2.75 | – |
| Total | 21,439 | 100.00 | 37 |
| Valid votes | 21,439 | 95.83 | |
| Invalid/blank votes | 932 | 4.17 | |
| Total votes | 22,371 | 100.00 | |
| Registered voters/turnout | 34,198 | 65.42 | |
Source: RIK

Damjan Miljanić was chosen for another term as mayor after the election.

=== Lučani ===
Lučani was scheduled to have a local election in late 2022 with the expiry of the mandate of the assembly elected in 2018. Incumbent mayor Milivoje Dolović of the Serbian Progressive Party resigned in January 2022 to harmonize the local election with the 2022 Serbian general election and was appointed as leader of a provisional administration.

Dolović was chosen as the ballot representative of the SNS-led list which was proclaimed on 17 February. The SPS–JS coalition's list was confirmed on 21 February. In early March, the City Election Commission confirmed the ballot list led by POKS. A civic group named "One Team" also announced its participation in the election, and its ballot list was confirmed by 14 March, including SRS. In the previous local election, Lučani was noted as a municipality with a high amount of blackmail and pressure towards the voters, although local citizens noted that this did not occur during the electoral campaign period in March 2022.

In the municipality of Lučani, there were 15,414 eligible citizens that were able to vote in the local election. The local City Election Commission stated that the turnout was 72%. The Serbian Progressive Party won 20 seats and followed by them, One Team won 9 seats, the SPS–JS coalition won four seats, and POKS won two seats.

| Party | Votes | % | Seats |
|---|---|---|---|
| Aleksandar Vučić–Together We Can Do Everything (Serbian Progressive Party) | 5,939 | 54.99 | 20 |
| Citizens' Group: One Team | 2,632 | 24.37 | 9 |
| Ivica Dačić–Prime Minister of Serbia (Socialist Party of Serbia, United Serbia) | 1,308 | 12.11 | 4 |
| Movement for the Restoration of the Kingdom of Serbia–Ivana Joković–Miloš Parandilović | 631 | 5.84 | 2 |
| Dr. Vojislav Šešelj–Serbian Radical Party | 290 | 2.69 | – |
| Total | 10,800 | 100.00 | 35 |
| Valid votes | 10,800 | 96.99 | |
| Invalid/blank votes | 335 | 3.01 | |
| Total votes | 11,135 | 100.00 | |
| Registered voters/turnout | 15,414 | 72.24 | |
Source: RIK

Milivoje Dolović was chosen for another term as mayor after the election.

=== Majdanpek ===
The local City Election Commission confirmed the SNS ballot list on 16 February, while the SPS list was confirmed on 22 February. The civic group "It can be different" ballot list was confirmed on 25 February. On 12 March, the ballot list led by Dveri was confirmed by the City Election Commission, and two days later, ballot lists led by SRS, NADA, and a civic group "I don't give up!" were confirmed. Besides them, the Vlach Party and Vlach Party "Bridge" had also announced their participation in the election, although their ballot lists were not confirmed by the City Election Commission.

In the municipality of Majdanpek, there were 16,251 eligible citizens that were able to vote in the local election. Electoral irregularities were reported to have occurred at voting stations. The local City Election Commission reported that the turnout was 59%. The Serbian Progressive Party won 19 seats and followed by them, the SPS–JS coalition won 5 seats, "I don't give up" won three seats, "It can be different" won two seats, and Dveri and NADA won one seat respectively.

| Party | Votes | % | Seats |
|---|---|---|---|
| Serbian Progressive Party | 5,174 | 55.20 | 19 |
| SPS–JS | 1,348 | 14.38 | 5 |
| I don't give up! | 1,021 | 10.89 | 3 |
| It can be different | 783 | 8.35 | 2 |
| Dveri | 498 | 5.31 | 1 |
| National Democratic Alternative | 364 | 3.88 | 1 |
| Serbian Radical Party | 186 | 1.98 | 0 |
| Total | 9,374 | 100.00 | 31 |
| Valid votes | 9,374 | 96.20 | |
| Invalid/blank votes | 370 | 3.80 | |
| Total votes | 9,744 | 100.00 | |
| Registered voters/turnout | 16,251 | 59.96 | |
Source: RIK

=== Medveđa ===
The SNS ballot list was confirmed by GIK on 16 February, being the first one to submit a ballot in Medveđa. In early March, it held a campaign rally in the town. Six more ballot lists were confirmed by 14 March, after an announcement from the City Election Commission in Medveđa.

In the municipality of Medveđa, there were 6,175 eligible citizens that were able to vote in the local election. The local City Election Commission stated that the turnout was 64%. The Serbian Progressive Party won 13 seats and followed by them, "Medveđa has better" won 5 seats, the Socialist Party of Serbia won three seats, the Democratic Party "For Medveđa" won two seats, the Party for Democratic Action and For the Development of Medveđa each won one seat.

| Party | Votes | % | Seats |
|---|---|---|---|
| Serbian Progressive Party | 1,811 | 47.52 | 13 |
| Meveđa has better | 781 | 20.49 | 5 |
| Socialist Party of Serbia | 487 | 12.78 | 3 |
| Democratic Party "For Medveđa" | 278 | 7.29 | 2 |
| Party for Democratic Action | 173 | 4.54 | 1 |
| For the Development of Medveđa | 169 | 4.43 | 1 |
| Serbian Radical Party | 112 | 2.94 | 0 |
| Total | 3,811 | 100.00 | 25 |
| Valid votes | 3,811 | 96.46 | |
| Invalid/blank votes | 140 | 3.54 | |
| Total votes | 3,951 | 100.00 | |
| Registered voters/turnout | 6,175 | 63.98 | |
Source: RIK

=== Sečanj ===
Incumbent mayor Predrag Rađenović of the Serbian Progressive Party (SNS) resigned on 1 January 2022. Miomira Milošević, also of the Progressives, was appointed leader of a provisional authority pending new elections.

SNS submitted its list on 17 February, while the SPS ballot list was confirmed on 19 February. An opposition civic group named "For a Better Municipality of Sečanj", which was led by Vukašin Baćina, announced its participation in the election on 21 February, and its ballot list was confirmed on 28 February. SRS also announced its participation in the election, and its ballot list was confirmed in early March. Baćina was arrested on 1 March, with the police claiming that his arrest occurred because of alleged bribery that took place in February 2022.

In the municipality of Sečanj, there were 10,481 eligible citizens that were able to vote in the local election. The local City Election Commission stated that the turnout was 67%. According to the results, the Serbian Progressive Party won 14 seats and followed by them, the SPS–JS coalition won 6 seats, and the For the better Municipality of Sečanj won two seats.

| Party | Votes | % | Seats |
|---|---|---|---|
| Aleksandar Vučić–Together We Can Do Everything (Serbian Progressive Party) | 3,976 | 59.88 | 14 |
| Ivica Dačić–Prime Minister of Serbia (Socialist Party of Serbia) | 1,693 | 25.50 | 6 |
| Citizens' Group: Vukašin Baćina–For a Better Municipality of Sečanj | 747 | 11.25 | 2 |
| Dr. Vojislav Šešelj–Serbian Radical Party | 224 | 3.37 | 1 |
| Total | 6,640 | 100.00 | 23 |
| Valid votes | 6,640 | 94.65 | |
| Invalid/blank votes | 375 | 5.35 | |
| Total votes | 7,015 | 100.00 | |
| Registered voters/turnout | 10,481 | 66.93 | |

Nebojša Meljanac of the Progressives was chosen as mayor when the new assembly convened.

=== Smederevska Palanka ===
An election was held for the Municipal Assembly of Smederevska Palanka due to the expiry of the term of the previous assembly elected in 2018.

In Smederevska Palanka, GIK confirmed the SNS ballot list on 16 February. It confirmed the SPS–JS list on 18 February, and on the same day, it also proclaimed the list led by NS. On 5 March, the SRS ballot list was confirmed, and a day later the NS ballot list was proclaimed by the City Election Commission. On 11 March, the People's Front and ZS ballot lists were confirmed. SSP stated in early March that their ballot list was declined by the City Election Commission, with the president of the City Election Commission stating that the commission does not have a quorum. Its ballot list was confirmed later on 6 March.

In the municipality of Smederevska Palanka, there were 39,932 eligible citizens that were able to vote in the local election. The local City Election Commission reported that the turnout was 58%. According to the results, the Serbian Progressive Party won 34 seats and followed by them, the coalition around the Party of Freedom and Justice, SPS–JS coalition, and the People's Party have won 4 seats, the Healthy Serbia won two seats, and the People's Front won one seat.

| Party | Votes | % | Seats |
|---|---|---|---|
| Aleksandar Vučić–Together We Can Do Everything (Serbian Progressive Party) | 14,295 | 63.87 | 34 |
| Marinika Tepić–United for the Victory of Palanka (Party of Freedom and Justice, Democratic Party) | 2,076 | 9.28 | 4 |
| Ivica Dačić–Prime Minister of Serbia (Socialist Party of Serbia, United Serbia) | 2,003 | 8.95 | 4 |
| People's Party, Movement of Free Citizens–United for Palanka–Nenad Milojičić | 1,789 | 7.99 | 4 |
| Healthy Serbia–Healthy Palanka Milan Stamatović | 1,005 | 4.49 | 2 |
| People's Front–Bridge–Dušica Savić (Strong Serbia) | 715 | 3.19 | 1 |
| Dr. Vojislav Šešelj–Serbian Radical Party | 499 | 2.23 | – |
| Total | 22,382 | 100.00 | 49 |
| Valid votes | 22,382 | 95.30 | |
| Invalid/blank votes | 1,103 | 4.70 | |
| Total votes | 23,485 | 100.00 | |
| Registered voters/turnout | 39,932 | 58.81 | |
Source: RIK

Incumbent mayor Nikola Vučen of the Serbian Progressive Party was confirmed for another term in office after the election.

Future parliamentarian Nenad Milojičić was re-elected to the assembly from the lead position on the People's Party list. He joined the breakaway People's Movement of Serbia in 2023.

=== Užice: Sevojno ===
An election was held for the Municipal Assembly of Sevojno due to the expiry of the term of the previous assembly elected in 2018.

The SNS-led coalition in Sevojno formed a coalition with SPS, and their ballot was confirmed by GIK on 18 February. Healthy Serbia (ZS) submitted its ballot on 20 February. In early March, the SRS ballot list was proclaimed. The UZPS coalition had also announced its participation in the local election, and its ballot list was confirmed on 8 March. The SSZ ballot list was confirmed on the same day. By 15 March, the JS ballot list was also confirmed by the City Election Commission. During the electoral campaign, SNS announced that the reconstruction of the ambulance building would begin in April. Avram Ilić, a Healthy Serbia representative, stated that "further decentralization would be necessary for a better life of the citizens in Sevojno".

In the municipality of Sevojno, there were 5,681 eligible citizens that were able to vote in the local election. The local City Election Commission reported that the turnout was 70%. The Serbian Progressive Party won 10 seats and followed by them, the Healthy Serbia won 4 seats, while the United for the Victory of Serbia coalition won 2 seats and other parties managed to cross the threshold.

| Party | Votes | % | Seats |
|---|---|---|---|
| Aleksandar Vučić–Together We Can Do Everything (Serbian Progressive Party, Socialist Party of Serbia, Party of United Pensioners of Serbia) | 1,865 | 47.94 | 10 |
| Milan Stamatović–May Health Prevail Avram Ilić (Healthy Serbia) | 895 | 23.01 | 4 |
| United for Sevojno–Bogosav Mihailović (Democratic Party, Party of Freedom and Justice) | 526 | 13.52 | 2 |
| Milica Đurđević Stamenkovski–Serbian Party Oathkeepers | 228 | 5.86 | 1 |
| Dr. Vojislav Šešelj–Serbian Radical Party | 221 | 5.68 | 1 |
| United Serbia–Dragan Marković Palma–At Home for Sevojno | 155 | 3.98 | 1 |
| Total | 3,890 | 100.00 | 19 |
| Valid votes | 3,890 | 97.84 | |
| Invalid/blank votes | 86 | 2.16 | |
| Total votes | 3,976 | 100.00 | |
| Registered voters/turnout | 5,681 | 69.99 | |
Source: RIK

Mirjana Đurić of the Serbian Progressive Party was chosen as mayor after the election. The administration was supported by the Progressive Party, the Socialist Party of Serbia, the Party of United Pensioners of Serbia, and United Serbia.

== Aftermath ==
In Sečanj, Vukašin Baćina and his citizens group declined to join the local government led by Serbian Progressive Party. Vesna Đurić, who previously served as the president of the municipality of Bajina Bašta, was sworn in on 12 May; all 24 members of the Serbian Progressive Party city assembly group voted in favour. On the same day, Damjan Miljanić was chosen as the president of the municipality of Kula. A day later, Serbian Progressive Party formed a local government in Lučani together with the Socialist Party of Serbia.
