= Radoslav Milojičić =

Serbian politician

- Радослав Милојичић
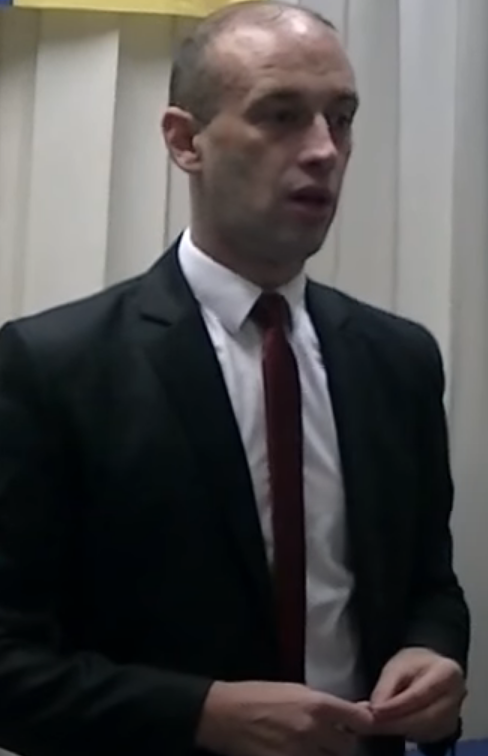

Member of the National Assembly
- Incumbent
- Assumed office 6 February 2024
- In office 3 June 2016 – 3 June 2020

Mayor of Smederevska Palanka
- In office 2012–2016

Deputy Mayor of Smederevska Palanka
- In office 2008–2012

Personal details
- Born: 1984 (age 41–42) Smederevska Palanka, SR Serbia, SFR Yugoslavia
- Party: DS (2002–2020); SL (2022–2024); SNS (2024–present)
- Occupation: Politician, economist
- Nickname: "Kena"

Radoslav Milojičić "Kena" (Serbian Cyrillic: Радослав Милојичић "Кена"; born 1984) is a Serbian politician serving as a member of the National Assembly since 6 February 2024. A member of the populist Serbian Progressive Party (SNS), Milojičić previously served as the mayor of Smederevska Palanka from 2012 to 2016 and as a member of the National Assembly from 2016 to 2020.

He was a high-ranking member of the Democratic Party (DS) from 2002 to 2020 and the president of the Serbian Left (SL) from 2022 to 2024.

== Early life and career ==
Milojičić is an economist based in Smederevska Palanka. He joined the Democratic Party (DS) in 2002, has led the party organization in Smederevska Palanka since 2008, and has overseen the DS's election headquarters in local and provincial (i.e., Vojvodina) elections.

== Political career ==
Milojičić served as president of the municipality (i.e., mayor) of Smederevska Palanka from 2012 to 2016. In the aftermath of the 2014 Southeast Europe floods, he announced that the municipality would sue the state agency Srbijavode for what he described as its poor response to the crisis in the area.

He first sought election to the National Assembly of Serbia in the 2012 election, in which he received the 121st position on the Democratic Party's Choice for a Better Life electoral list. The list won sixty-seven mandates, and he was not elected. He was promoted to the twenty-eighth position on the Democratic Party's list for the 2014 election and again missed election when the list won only nineteen mandates.

Milojičić received the thirteenth position on the Democratic Party's list in the 2016 Serbian parliamentary election and was elected when the list won sixteen mandates. He currently sits as an opposition member of the assembly. Milojičić is a member of the parliamentary committee on the diaspora and Serbs in the region and the security services control committee, a deputy member of the committee on Kosovo-Metohija, and a member of the parliamentary friendship groups with Argentina, China, and Cuba.

In late 2016, Milojičić was selected as chair of the Democratic Party's executive committee. Shortly after this appointment, he expressed concern that the state broadcaster Radio Television of Serbia was biased toward the governing Serbian Progressive Party (SNS), saying, "Anyone who thinks and speaks differently from the SNS [Serbian Progressive Party] is reviled and scorned in media. The DS did not tolerate that in the 1990s nor in 2000. It will not tolerate it today."

In March 2018, he described SNS as the most brutal political organization in Serbia since 1990 and called for a united opposition to confront it.

In January 2022, Milojičić was elected president of the newly formed political party called the Serbian Left and announced participation at the 2022 parliamentary election. SL however, did not participate in the 2022 election.

In the 2023 parliamentary election, Milojičić and SL joined the SNS-led coalition and Milojičić was elected to the National Assembly once again. In June 2024, Milojičić resigned as the president of SL and joined SNS.

== Personal life ==
Milojičić is the step-brother of Nenad Milojičić, who was elected to the national assembly in the 2023 parliamentary election as a member of the opposition People's Movement of Serbia (NPS).
