= 2014 Serbian local elections =

A small number of municipalities in Serbia held local elections in 2014. These were not part of the country's regular cycle of local elections but instead took place in certain jurisdictions where either the local government had fallen or the last local elections for four-year terms had taken place in 2010.

All local elections in 2014 were held under proportional representation. Mayors were not directly elected but were instead chosen by elected members of the local assemblies. Parties were required to cross a five per cent electoral threshold (of all votes, not only of valid votes), although this requirement was waived for parties representing national minority communities.

== Results ==
=== Belgrade ===
==== 2014 Belgrade City Assembly election ====
Party	Votes	%	Seats
SNS-SDPS-NS-SPO-PS coalition	351,183	45.17	63
DS-NS coalition	126,429	16.26	22
SPS–PUPS–JS coalition	92,539	11.90	16
Democratic Party of Serbia	51,435	6.62	9
Group of citizens - total	43,250	5.56	–
Dveri	30,075	3.87	–
NDS–Greens–ZZS coalition	29,504	3.80	–
LDP–SDU coalition	25,762	3.31	–
Serbian Radical Party	16,250	2.09	–
United Regions of Serbia	9,391	1.21	–
Party of Russians of Serbia	845	0.11	–
Alliance of Vojvodina Hungarians	774	0.10	–
Total	777,437	100.00	110
Valid votes	777,437	96.65	
Invalid/blank votes	26,936	3.35	
Total votes	804,373	100.00	
Registered voters/turnout	1,588,996	50.62	

=== Vojvodina ===
==== Pećinci ====
The municipal assembly of Pećinci was dissolved in October 2013, having been dysfunctional for a period of several months. Sava Čojčić, who had previously served as mayor, was appointed as head of a provisional administration. A new local election was held on 16 March 2014.

Party	Votes	%	Seats
"Aleksandar Vučić–The Future We Believe In" (Serbian Progressive Party, Democratic Party of Serbia, Party of United Pensioners of Serbia, New Serbia, Movement of Socialists, Serbian Renewal Movement)	5,749	48.35	17
Citizens' Group: Milenko Đurđević For Our Village	2,162	18.18	6
Democratic Party–Živko Marković	1,618	13.61	5
Citizens' Group: For a Progressive and Free Municipality	812	6.83	2
Socialist Party of Serbia–Ivica Dačić	618	5.20	–
Čedomir Jovanović–Liberal Democratic Party	351	2.95	–
Serbian Radical Party–Dr. Vojislav Šešelj	245	2.06	–
Serb Democratic Party, Branislav Svonja	202	1.70	–
Citizens' Group: Saša Ristivojević, Moj Šor, Avlija i Komšija	134	1.13	–
Total	11,891	100.00	30
Valid votes	11,891	95.78	
Invalid/blank votes	524	4.22	
Total votes	12,415	100.00	
Registered voters/turnout	16,127	76.98	

Dubravka Kovačević Subotički of the Serbian Progressive Party was chosen as mayor after the election. She resigned in November 2017 and was appointed to lead a provisional administration pending a new election the following month.

=== Šumadija and Western Serbia ===
==== Aranđelovac ====
An election was held in Aranđelovac on 16 March 2014, due to the expiry of the term of the previous assembly elected in 2010.

Party	Votes	%	Seats
"Aleksandar Vučić–The Future We Believe In" (Serbian Progressive Party)	12,167	54.02	27
"Ivica Dačić–Socialist Party of Serbia (SPS), Party of United Pensioners of Serbia (PUPS), United Serbia (JS)"	2,905	12.90	6
"Democratic Party of Serbia–Dr. Vojislav Koštunica"	1,434	6.37	3
"Liberal Democratic Party–Čedomir Jovanović"	1,318	5.85	3
"Dveri–Vladan Glišić"	1,231	5.47	2
"United Regions of Serbia–Dr. Aleksandar Damjanić"	1,041	4.62	–
Citizens' Group: "With the Democratic Party for a Democratic Aranđelovac"	728	3.23	–
"Boris Tadić–New Democratic Party–Greens"	665	2.95	–
"Serbian Radical Party–Dr. Vojislav Šešelj"	596	2.65	–
Citizens' Group: "GEPS for Aranđelovac Dr. Goran Milinković"	437	1.94	–
Total	22,522	100.00	41
Valid votes	22,522	96.87	
Invalid/blank votes	728	3.13	
Total votes	23,250	100.00	
Registered voters/turnout	38,217	60.84	

Incumbent mayor Bojan Radović of the Progressive Party was confirmed for another term in office after the election.

==== Lučani ====
An election was held in Lučani on 28 December 2014, with repeat voting in the village of Dučalovići on 5 January 2015. The Serbian government had previously established a provisional authority led by Slobodan Jolović on 23 October 2014, replacing the administration of outgoing Social Democratic Party mayor Mladomir Sretenović. Jolović was replaced later in the year by Miloś Velanac. Velanac in turn resigned in January 2015 and was very briefly replaced by Milivoje Dolović.

Party	Votes	%	Seats
"Aleksandar Vučić–Serbian Progressive Party"	5,289	51.88	24
"New Serbia–Velimir Ilić"	1,552	15.22	7
"Dveri, Farmers and Youth for the Salvation of Our Municipality–Milan Parezanović"	1,218	11.95	5
"Ivica Dačić–Socialist Party of Serbia, United Serbia"	1,135	11.13	5
Citizens' Group list: "One Team"	1,000	9.81	4
Total	10,194	100.00	45
Valid votes	10,194	96.52	
Invalid/blank votes	367	3.48	
Total votes	10,561	100.00	
Registered voters/turnout	17,806	59.31	

Vesna Stambolić of the Progressive Party was chosen as mayor in February 2015.

==== Mionica ====
Party	Votes	%	Seats
SNS-NS-SDPS-SPO-DSS coalition	5,285	64.71	25
SPS-JS coalition	1,458	17.85	7
DS–LDP–URS–SDU	1,424	17.44	7
Total	8,167	100.00	39
Valid votes	8,167	96.93	
Invalid/blank votes	259	3.07	
Total votes	8,426	100.00	
Registered voters/turnout	11,970	70.39	

==== Užice: Sevojno ====
The newly created municipality of Sevojno (in the city of Užice) had its inaugural local elections in 2014.

Party	Votes	%	Seats
"Aleksandar Vučić–The Future We Believe In" (Serbian Progressive Party)	1,091	32.45	5
Ivica Dačić–"Socialist Party of Serbia (SPS), Party of United Pensioners of Serbia (PUPS), United Serbia (JS), Strength of Serbia Movement (PSS-BK)"	649	19.30	3
"New Serbia–Milivoje Jeremić Jeremija"	566	16.84	3
Branislav Marić–United Regions of Serbia	416	12.37	2
Democratic Party–Sevojno	240	7.14	1
Dr. Vojislav Koštunica–DSS Sevojno–Svoji na Svome	229	6.81	1
Čedomir Jovanović–Liberal Democratic Party	171	5.09	–
Total	3,362	100.00	15
Valid votes	3,362	95.11	
Invalid/blank votes	173	4.89	
Total votes	3,535	100.00	
Registered voters/turnout	5,969	59.22	

Brane Sindžirević of the Serbian Progressive Party was chosen as mayor after the election.
