= 2018 Serbian local elections =

A small number of cities and municipalities in Serbia held local elections in 2018. These were not part of the country's regular cycle of local elections but instead took place in certain jurisdictions where either the local government had fallen or the last local elections for four-year terms had taken place in 2014.

All local elections in Serbia in 2018 were held under proportional representation. Mayors were not directly elected but were instead chosen by elected members of the local assemblies. Parties were required to cross a five per cent electoral threshold (of all votes, not only of valid votes), although this requirement was waived for parties representing national minority communities.

== Results ==
=== Belgrade ===
==== City of Belgrade ====
See: 2018 Belgrade City Assembly election

=== Vojvodina ===
==== Kula ====
An election was held in Kula on 16 December 2018. The municipality's mayor Velibor Milojičić had resigned in September 2018, at which time he was appointed leader of a provisional administration.

Party	Votes	%	Seats
Aleksandar Vučić–Because We Love Kula (Serbian Progressive Party, Alliance of Vojvodina Hungarians)	10,629	61.78	26
Socialist Party of Serbia–Ivica Dačić	2,008	11.67	5
Citizens' Group: Critical Mass	1,631	9.48	4
Movement for the Restoration of the Kingdom of Serbia–Marko Košutić	1,202	6.99	2
Movement of Socialists–Aleksandar Vulin	692	4.02	–
Russian Party–Dušan Hajduković–Kekini principi	388	2.26	–
Party of United Pensioners of Serbia–Milan Krkobabić–Kula Is Also Serbia	359	2.09	–
Serbian Radical Party–Dr. Vojislav Šešelj	296	1.72	–
Total	17,205	100.00	37
Valid votes	17,205	96.34	
Invalid/blank votes	654	3.66	
Total votes	17,859	100.00	
Registered voters/turnout	35,920	49.72	

Damjan Miljanić of the Progressive Party was appointed as mayor after the election. He resigned in January 2022 in order to harmonize that year's scheduled municipal election with the 2022 Serbian general election and was appointed as leader of a provisional authority.

=== Šumadija and Western Serbia ===
==== Aranđelovac ====
An election was held in Aranđelovac on 5 March 2018, due to the expiry of the term of the previous assembly election in 2014.

Party	Votes	%	Seats
Aleksandar Vučić–Because We Love Aranđelovac–Serbian Progressive Party	11,901	58.78	26
People for a Better Aranđelovac–Dragon Jovanović (Serbian Radical Party–Dr. Vojislav Šešelj, People's Freedom Movement, Better Serbia)	2,684	13.26	6
Ivica Dačić–Socialist Party of Serbia–United Serbia–Dragan Marković Palma	2,486	12.28	5
Citizens' Group: Dr. Radosav Švabić–The Right Way	1,120	5.53	2
Together to Victory–Democratic Party, Liberal Democratic Party, People's Party, New Party, Social Democratic Party–Slobodan Jaredić	1,080	5.33	2
Citizens' Group: Choose Aranđelovac	974	4.81	–
Total	20,245	100.00	41
Valid votes	20,245	96.75	
Invalid/blank votes	681	3.25	
Total votes	20,926	100.00	
Registered voters/turnout	37,715	55.48	

Incumbent mayor Bojan Radović of the Progressive Party was confirmed for another term in office after the election.

==== Lučani ====
An election was held in Lučani on 16 December 2018, due to the expiry of the term of the previous assembly elected in 2014. Several opposition parties that chose to boycott other local elections held in late 2018 nonetheless participated in the Lučani vote.

Party	Votes	%	Seats
Aleksandar Vučić–Because We Love Lučani and Dragačevo (Serbian Progressive Party, Serbian People's Party)	7,852	68.37	27
Alliance for Serbia–Alliance for Dragačevo–Milan Radičević–Dveri–Democratic Party–People's Party–Together for Serbia–Healthy Serbia–Serbian Left–Movement for Reversal–Sloga–Otadžbina	1,137	9.90	4
Citizens' Group: One Team–Ivica Vukićević	826	7.19	2
Ivica Dačić–Socialist Party of Serbia (SPS)–Better Serbia (BS)	668	5.82	2
Movement for the Restoration of the Kingdom of Serbia–Dragan Jovičić	348	3.03	–
United Serbia–Dragan Marković Palma	276	2.40	–
Dr. Vojislav Šešelj–Serbian Radical Party	206	1.79	–
Milan Krkobabić–Party of United Pensioners of Serbia–Lučani Is Also Serbia	171	1.49	–
Total	11,484	100.00	35
Valid votes	11,484	97.87	
Invalid/blank votes	250	2.13	
Total votes	11,734	100.00	
Registered voters/turnout	16,473	71.23	

Milivoje Dolović of the Serbian Progressive Party was chosen as mayor in January 2019. He resigned in January 2022, as a means of harmonizing the municipality's schedule for the 2022 local election with the 2022 Serbian general election and was appointed as leader of a provisional administration.

==== Užice: Sevojno ====
An election was held for the Municipal Assembly of Sevojno (in the city of Užice) on 3 April 2018, due to the expiry of the term of the previous assembly elected in 2014.

Party	Votes	%	Seats
Aleksandar Vučić—Because We Love Sevojno–Ivica Dačić–Socialist Party of Serbia–Party of United Pensioners of Serbia–Serbian People's Party	2,368	63.66	10
United We Win, For Sevojno, For Serbia	1,115	29.97	5
Dr. Vojislav Šešelj–Serbian Radical Party	131	3.52	–
Serbian Movement Dveri	106	2.85	–
Total	3,720	100.00	15
Valid votes	3,720	97.64	
Invalid/blank votes	90	2.36	
Total votes	3,810	100.00	
Registered voters/turnout	5,881	64.78	

Ivan Marić of the Serbian Progressive Party was chosen as mayor after the election.

=== Southern and Eastern Serbia ===
==== Doljevac ====
Doljevac had a municipal election on 16 December 2018. The vote was prompted by the resignation of the municipality's mayor, Goran Ljubić of the Serbian Progressive Party, on the grounds that he objected to the constant criticisms of Nenad Stojiljković (Dveri), the only opposition member of the assembly between 2016 and 2018, and wanted to test the mood of the electorate. The election was boycotted by opposition parties and was criticized by some as a waste of money. Ljubić served as the leader of Doljevac's provisional government in 2018–19, before a new administration was established.

The results of the election were as follows:

Party	Votes	%	Seats
Aleksandar Vučić–Because We Love Doljevac (Serbian Progressive Party, Social Democratic Party of Serbia)	9,149	85.20	33
United Serbia–Dragan Marković Palma	682	6.35	2
Ivica Dačić–Socialist Party of Serbia (SPS)	605	5.63	2
Dr. Vojislav Šešelj–Serbian Radical Party	139	1.29	–
Milan Krkobabić–Party of United Pensioners of Serbia–Doljevac Is Also Serbia	122	1.14	–
Citizens' Group: Alliance for a Democratic Doljevac	41	0.38	–
Total	10,738	100.00	37
Valid votes	10,738	97.90	
Invalid/blank votes	230	2.10	
Total votes	10,968	100.00	
Registered voters/turnout	14,714	74.54	

Goran Ljubić was confirmed for a new term as mayor when the assembly convened in January 2019. He resigned in January 2022 in order to harmonize that year's municipal election with the 2022 Serbian general election and was appointed as leader of an interim administration.

==== Smederevska Palanka ====
The local assembly of Smederevska Palanka was dissolved in November 2017 for failing to meet within the legally designated time. Nikola Vučen of the Serbian Progressive Party was appointed as the leader of a provisional authority pending new elections, which took place on 25 March 2018.

The results of the election were as follows:

Party	Votes	%	Seats
Aleksandar Vučić–Because We Love Smederevska Palanka–Serbian Progressive Party	15,737	69.60	37
Palanka in the Heart–Dr. Nikola Grujić–Radoslav Milojičić Kena (Democratic Party, New Party, Democratic Party of Serbia)	2,303	10.19	5
Ivica Dačić–Socialist Party of Serbia (SPS)–Dragan Marković Palma–United Serbia (JS)	1,722	7.62	4
People's Party, Vuk Jeremić	1,287	5.69	3
Dveri–New Serbia–Miloš Popović	796	3.52	–
Alliance for a Strong Palanka–Dušica Savić–Strong Serbia–Bridge	413	1.83	–
I Give the Word–Serbian Radical Party–Dr. Vojislav Šešelj, Strength of Serbia Movement–Dragomir Karić, People's Freedom Movement–Miroslav Parović	353	1.56	–
Total	22,611	100.00	49
Valid votes	22,611	95.41	
Invalid/blank votes	1,087	4.59	
Total votes	23,698	100.00	
Registered voters/turnout	41,937	56.51	

Nikola Vučen was confirmed as mayor after the election.

Future parliamentarian Nenad Milojičić was elected from the lead position on the People's Party list.
