= 2017 Serbian local elections =

A small number of municipalities in Serbia held local elections in 2017. These were not part of the country's regular cycle of local elections but instead took place in certain jurisdictions where either the local government had fallen or the last local elections for four-year terms had taken place in 2013.

All local elections in Serbia in 2017 were held under proportional representation. Mayors were not directly elected but were instead chosen by elected members of the local assemblies. Parties were required to cross a five per cent electoral threshold (of all votes, not only of valid votes), although this requirement was waived for parties representing national minority communities.

== Results ==
=== Vojvodina ===
==== Kovin ====
An election was held in Kovin on 23 April 2017 due to the expiry of the mandate of the previous assembly elected in 2013.

Party	Votes	%	Seats
Aleksandar Vučić–Faster, Stronger, Better	5,803	43.27	22
Ivica Dačić–"Socialist Party of Serbia (SPS), Communist Party (KP), Greens of Serbia (ZS), Movement of Socialists (PS), Serbian People's Party (SNP)	1,891	14.10	7
Dragan Marković Palma–"United Serbia"	1,657	12.35	6
Citizens' Group: Kovin Can Do Better-Together for Our Municipality–Dr. Ivan Dotlić	1,228	9.16	4
Democratic Party–Dr. Vladimir Tasić	1,146	8.54	4
Alliance of Vojvodina Hungarians–István Pásztor	726	5.41	2
Party of United Pensioners of Serbia–Milan Krkobabić	525	3.91	–
Serbian Radical Party–Dr. Vojislav Šešelj	436	3.25	–
Total	13,412	100.00	45
Valid votes	13,412	97.65	
Invalid/blank votes	323	2.35	
Total votes	13,735	100.00	
Registered voters/turnout	29,145	47.13	

Incumbent mayor Sanja Petrović was chosen for another term in office after the election, with the support of thirty-eight delegates. The Socialists participated in the local government. Petrović resigned as mayor in early 2020 in order to harmonize Kovin's municipal elections with Serbia's general local election cycle and was appointed as leader of a provisional administration pending the vote.

==== Odžaci ====
An election was held in Odžaci on 23 April 2017. The previous election had been held in December 2013; sitting mayor Dušan Marijan resigned in early 2017 to harmonize the municipal election with the 2017 Serbian presidential election. Marijan initially led a provisional authority pending new elections; he was later replaced by Latinka Vasiljković.

Party	Votes	%	Seats
Aleksandar Vučić–Faster, Stronger, Better	7,734	55.70	16
Ivica Dačić–Socialist Party of Serbia	2,653	19.11	5
Citizens' Group: Odžaci Can Do Better	1,185	8.54	2
Serbian Radical Party–Dr. Vojislav Šešelj	973	7.01	2
Democratic Party–Aleksandar Dikić	967	6.96	2
Citizens' Group: Enough Is Enough–Saša Radulović	372	2.68	–
Total	13,884	100.00	27
Valid votes	13,884	97.64	
Invalid/blank votes	335	2.36	
Total votes	14,219	100.00	
Registered voters/turnout	26,063	54.56	

Latinka Vasiljković was chosen as mayor after the election. She resigned in early 2020 to harmonize Odžaci's municipal elections with Serbia's general local election cycle; Goran Nikolić was appointed as the leader of a provisional authority pending the vote.

==== Pećinci ====
An election was held in Pećinci on 24 December 2017, due to the resignation of Serbian Progressive Party mayor Dubravka Kovačević Subotički the previous month. Kovačević Subotički was appointed to lead a provisional administration prior to the vote.

Party	Votes	%	Seats
Aleksandar Vučić–Serbian Progressive Party–Socialist Party of Serbia–Ivica Dačić	8,747	79.74	27
"With Dignity, Without Fear–Bata Marković–Democratic Party and LSV"–Živko Marković	963	8.78	3
"United Serbia"–Dragan Marković Palma	444	4.05	–
Citizens' Group: For Pećinci Without Corruption	339	3.09	–
Serbian Radical Party–Dr. Vojislav Šešelj	315	2.87	–
Liberal Democratic Party–Borisav Kostić	162	1.48	–
Total	10,970	100.00	30
Valid votes	10,970	97.47	
Invalid/blank votes	285	2.53	
Total votes	11,255	100.00	
Registered voters/turnout	15,994	70.37	

Željko Trbović of the Serbian Progressive Party was chosen as mayor after the election. Trbović resigned in early 2020 to harmonize Pećinci's local electoral cycle with the general 2020 Serbian local elections and was appointed to lead a new provisional administration.

==== Vrbas ====
An election was held in Vrbas on 23 April 2017 following the resignation of Progressive Party mayor Milan Glušac earlier in the year. Vrbas had held its last local election in 2013, and the assembly's regular term in office was scheduled to expire in October 2017. Glušac said that he resigned in order to harmonize Vrbas's municipal election with the 2017 Serbian presidential election as a cost-saving measure; he served as leader of a provisional authority pending the vote.

Party	Votes	%	Seats
Aleksandar Vučić–Faster, Stronger, Better	8,449	43.63	17
Socialist Party of Serbia (SPS)	4,304	22.23	8
Let's Free Vrbas	2,270	11.72	4
Movement of Socialists–Aleksandar Vulin	1,906	9.84	3
Serbian Radical Party–Dr. Vojislav Šešelj	1,414	7.30	2
Citizens' Group: Enough Is Enough–Saša Radulović	1,020	5.27	2
Total	19,363	100.00	36
Valid votes	19,363	97.37	
Invalid/blank votes	522	2.63	
Total votes	19,885	100.00	
Registered voters/turnout	35,947	55.32	

Milan Glušac was selected for another term as mayor after the election. He announced his resignation in November 2019, withdrew his resignation shortly thereafter, and definitively resigned in early 2020. It is understood that Glušac's resignations were timed in such as way as to harmonize Vrbas's next municipal vote with Serbia's main local election cycle. His resignation became official on 24 February 2020, and he was once again appointed as the leader of a provisional authority pending the next local election.

=== Sumadija and Western Serbia ===
==== Kosjerić ====
Elections were held for the Municipal Assembly of Kosjerić on 24 April 2017, due to the expiry of the mandate of the previous assembly elected in 2013.

Party	Votes	%	Seats
Aleksandar Vučić—Faster, Stronger, Better (Serbian Progressive Party, Socialist Party of Serbia, Social Democratic Party of Serbia, Party of United Pensioners of Serbia)	2,116	32.77	10
Democratic Party, Serbian Renewal Movement, Liberal Democratic Party–Before it's Too late	1,122	17.37	5
For a Healthy Serbia–Milan Stamatović–Kosjerić	765	11.85	3
Democratic Party of Serbia–Miloš Jovanović	633	9.80	3
Serbian People's Party–Nenad Popović	509	7.88	2
New Serbia–Velimir Ilić	508	7.87	2
Movement of Socialists Aleksandar Vulin	457	7.08	2
Dveri	269	4.17	–
Serbian Radical Party Dr. Vojislav Šešelj	79	1.22	–
Total	6,458	100.00	27
Valid votes	6,458	98.55	
Invalid/blank votes	95	1.45	
Total votes	6,553	100.00	
Registered voters/turnout	9,778	67.02	

Žarko Đokić of the Serbian Progressive Party was chosen as mayor after the election.

==== Mionica ====
Boban Janković of the Serbian Progressive Party resigned as mayor of Mionica on 25 October 2017 and was afterward appointed to lead a provisional administration. New elections were held on 24 December 2017.

Party	Votes	%	Seats
Aleksandar Vučić—Serbian Progressive Party	5,532	67.36	28
Ivica Dačić–Socialist Party of Serbia (SPS)–United Serbia (JS)–Dragan Marković Palma–Serbian Radical Party (SRS)–Dr. Vojislav Šešelj	1,317	16.04	6
Democratic Party Mionica Milan Gavrilović Ćićovan	1,150	14.00	5
Milan Krkobabić, Party of United Pensioners of Serbia (PUPS)	214	2.61	–
Total	8,213	100.00	39
Valid votes	8,213	97.07	
Invalid/blank votes	248	2.93	
Total votes	8,461	100.00	
Registered voters/turnout	11,464	73.80	

Boban Janković was again chosen as mayor after the election.
