= 2006–07 Serbian local elections =

A small number of Serbian municipalities held local elections in 2006 and 2007 for mayors, assembly members, or both. These were not part of the country's regular cycle of local elections but instead took place in certain jurisdictions where either the local government had fallen or the term of the municipal assembly had expired.

Serbia had introduced the direct election of mayors in 2002. This practice was abandoned with the 2008 cycle, but it was still in effect in 2006 and 2007, and some mayoral by-elections took place in those years. The constituent municipalities of Belgrade did not have directly elected mayors, and in these jurisdictions mayors were chosen by the elected assembly members.

All assembly elections were held under proportional representation with a three per cent electoral threshold. Successful lists were required to receive three per cent of all votes, not only of valid votes.

== Results ==
=== 2006 ===
==== Belgrade ====
===== Barajevo =====
An election for the Barajevo municipal assembly was held on 1 October 2006, with repeat voting in some polls on 8 October.

| Party | Votes | % | Seats |
|---|---|---|---|
| Democratic Party–Boris Tadić | 2,778 | 24.32 | 9 |
| Democratic Party of Serbia–Dr. Vojislav Koštunica | 2,421 | 21.20 | 8 |
| Serbian Radical Party–Tomislav Nikolić | 1,741 | 15.24 | 5 |
| Socialist Party of Serbia | 1,198 | 10.49 | 4 |
| New Serbia–Mr. Velimir Ilić | 1,195 | 10.46 | 4 |
| Strength of Serbia Movement–Bogoljub Karić–Dr. Igor Elez | 381 | 3.34 | 1 |
| Serbian Democratic Renewal Movement–Vojislav Mihailović–Veroljub Stevanović | 364 | 3.19 | 1 |
| G17 Plus–Mlađan Dinkić | 354 | 3.10 | 1 |
| Movement for Barajevo–Vladeta Vićentijević | 242 | 2.12 | – |
| "PUPS"–Nebojša Brkić | 192 | 1.68 | – |
| Citizens' Group: Zdravko Ilić | 182 | 1.59 | – |
| Liberal Democratic Party–Čeda Jovanović | 120 | 1.05 | – |
| Citizens' Group: Milan Gvozdić | 77 | 0.67 | – |
| Serbian Renewal Movement–Ivan Petković | 67 | 0.59 | – |
| Democratic Orthodox Party–Dr. Mihailo Petković | 65 | 0.57 | – |
| Citizens' Group: Petar Tešić | 30 | 0.26 | – |
| Citizens' Group: Slaviša Stanković–Settlement "Gaj"–Step to the City | 15 | 0.13 | – |
| Total | 11,422 | 100.00 | 33 |

Incumbent mayor Rade Stevanović of the Democratic Party of Serbia was selected for another term in office on 8 December 2006. He was dismissed from office on 12 February 2007 but was reinstated nine days later. Branislav Đurić of the Radical Party appears to have been acting mayor during the brief time Stevanović was out of office.

Stevanović was again dismissed on 30 April 2007. Igor Jevtić of New Serbia was initially dismissed as deputy mayor at the same time; however, his dismissal was overturned on 15 May and he appears to have served as acting mayor prior to the appointment of Branka Savić of the Democratic Party on 25 June.

==== Vojvodina ====
===== Bečej =====
Former Bečej mayor Đorđe Predin had been defeated in a 2005 recall election, and a by-election to replace him was held over two rounds on 5 and 19 February 2006. Peter Knezi, who had served as deputy mayor, may have been acting mayor during the election period.

2006 Municipality of Bečej local by-election: Mayor of Bečej
| Candidate | Party | First round | | Second round | |
| Candidate | Party | Votes | % | Votes | % |
|---|---|---|---|---|---|
| Dušan Jovanović | Democratic Party of Serbia | 2,571 | 17.05 | 9,147 | 65.45 |
| Dragan Živkov Džaja | Serbian Radical Party | 2,658 | 17.63 | 4,829 | 34.55 |
| Peter Knezi | Alliance of Vojvodina Hungarians | 2,417 | 16.03 | | |
| Živan Gavrilović | Socialist Party of Serbia | 1,743 | 11.56 | | |
| Zoran Subotički | G17 Plus | 1,741 | 11.55 | | |
| Gordana Kovačev | Democratic Party | 1,544 | 10.24 | | |
| Šandor Reperger | Strength of Serbia Movement–Bogoljub Karić | 908 | 6.02 | | |
| Slobodan Borojević Bata | Citizens' Group | 629 | 4.17 | | |
| Sándor Páll | Democratic Fellowship of Vojvodina Hungarians | 584 | 3.87 | | |
| Laslo Friš | Democratic Party of Vojvodina Hungarians | 282 | 1.87 | | |
| Total | | 15,077 | 100.00 | 13,976 | 100.00 |
| Valid votes | | 15,077 | 98.91 | 13,976 | 98.05 |
| Invalid/blank votes | | 166 | 1.09 | 278 | 1.95 |
| Total votes | | 15,243 | 100.00 | 14,254 | 100.00 |
| Registered voters/turnout | | 34,365 | 44.36 | 34,334 | 41.52 |

===== Beočin =====
Beočin mayor Zoran Tesić won a recall election on 3 December 2006. The preliminary results of the election were:

| Choice | Votes | % |
|---|---|---|
| No on recall | 2,731 | 53.93 |
| Yes on recall | 2,333 | 46.07 |
| Total valid votes | 5,064 | 100 |

===== Kovin =====
A new municipal assembly election was held in Kovin on 4 June 2006, and a mayoral by-election was held in two rounds on 25 June and 9 July.

2006 Municipality of Kovin local by-election: Mayor of Kovin
| Candidate | Party | First round | | Second round | |
| Candidate | Party | Votes | % | Votes | % |
|---|---|---|---|---|---|
| Sava Krstić | Democratic Party of Serbia, Dr. Vojislav Koštunica–New Serbia, Mr. Velimir Ilić | 2,342 | | 5,326 | 51.98 |
| Stevan Kolarević | Citizens' Group: Democratic Blok (Democratic Party, G17 Plus, League of Social Democrats of Vojvodina, Serbian Renewal Movement, Civic Alliance of Serbia, Alliance of Vojvodina Hungarians, Democratic Vojvodina, Vojvodina's Party, Reformists of Vojvodina) | 2,672 | | 4,921 | 48.02 |
| Blagoje Bogdanović | The Socialists (SPS and SNS) | | | | |
| Dragan Mićović | Citizens' Group: For Justice and Equality | | | | |
| Tatjana Radenković Jakšić | Serbian Radical Party | | | | |
| Jezdimir Ranković | Citizens' Group: Reformists | | | | |
| Gordana Zorić | Strength of Serbia Movement–Bogoljub Karić | | | | |
| Total | | | | 10,247 | 100.00 |
| Valid votes | | | | 10,247 | 97.84 |
| Invalid/blank votes | | | | 226 | 2.16 |
| Total votes | | | | 10,473 | 100.00 |
| Registered voters/turnout | | 30,007 | – | 30,007 | 34.90 |

Krstić was elected in the second round with the support of 17.45% of eligible voters, as against 16.41% for Kolarević.

===== Kula =====
Kula mayor Tihomir Đuričić was defeated in a recall election on 7 May 2006. A by-election to select a new mayor was held over two rounds on 25 June and 9 July 2006.

2006 Municipality of Kula local by-election: Mayor of Kula
| Candidate | Party | First round | | Second round | |
| Candidate | Party | Votes | % | Votes | % |
|---|---|---|---|---|---|
| Svetozar Bukvić | Democratic Party | | 38.46 | | 53.55 |
| Tihomir Đuričić | Serbian Radical Party | | 32.78 | | 46.45 |
| Smiljana Vukelić | Socialist Party of Serbia | | | | |
| Hercen Radonjić | Green Party (Stranka Zelenih) | | | | |
| Stanko Studen | Citizens' Group: Patriotic Alliance of Kula | | | | |
| Total | | | | | |

===== Novi Bečej =====
Novi Bečej mayor Aca T. Ðukičin was defeated in a recall election on 9 April 2006.

| Choice | Votes | % |
|---|---|---|
| Yes on recall | 3,164 | 56.68 |
| No on recall | 2,418 | 43.32 |
| Total valid votes | 5,582 | 100 |

A by-election to select a new mayor was held over two rounds on 4 and 18 June 2006.

2006 Municipality of Novi Bečej local by-election: Mayor of Novi Bečej
| Candidate | Party | First round | | Second round | |
| Candidate | Party | Votes | % | Votes | % |
|---|---|---|---|---|---|
| Milivoj Vrebalov Miša | Liberal Democratic Party | 1,696 | 20.76 | 4,136 | 50.89 |
| Saša Maksimović | Serbian Radical Party | 2,013 | 24.64 | 3,992 | 49.11 |
| Radoslav Čokić | Democratic Party of Serbia | 1,203 | 14.72 | | |
| Aca T. Ðukičin | Democratic Party | 1,021 | 12.50 | | |
| Zoran Trifunac | Citizens' Group: Zoran Trifunac and Citizens | 793 | 9.71 | | |
| Branimir Lisičin | Socialist Party of Serbia | 598 | 7.32 | | |
| Petar Kerkez | Citizens' Group: Da Pobedimo Prošlost | 558 | 6.83 | | |
| Momir Mandić Moma | Party of United Pensioners of Serbia | 288 | 3.53 | | |
| Total | | 8,170 | 100.00 | 8,128 | 100.00 |
| Valid votes | | 8,170 | 98.54 | | |
| Invalid/blank votes | | 121 | 1.46 | | |
| Total votes | | 8,291 | 100.00 | | |
| Registered voters/turnout | | 20,786 | 39.89 | | |

===== Odžaci =====
Odžaci mayor Milan Ćuk won a recall election on 3 December 2006.

==== Central Serbia (excluding Belgrade) ====
===== Despotovac =====
Elections were held in Despotovac on 1 October 2006 to elect a mayor and members of the municipal assembly. The second round of voting in the mayoral election took place on 15 October 2006.

2006 Municipality of Despotovac local by-election: Mayor of Despotovac
| Candidate | Party | First round | | Second round | |
| Candidate | Party | Votes | % | Votes | % |
|---|---|---|---|---|---|
| Gradimir Malešević | Democratic Party of Serbia–New Serbia–United Serbia | 5,576 | 42.62 | 5,525 | 52.48 |
| Radivoje Milanović | Democratic Party–Liberals of Serbia | 4,050 | 30.96 | 5,003 | 47.52 |
| Slobodan Stojanović | Serbian Radical Party | | | | |
| Momir Anđelković | Socialist Party of Serbia | | | | |
| Total | | | | 10,528 | 100.00 |

Results of the election for the Municipal Assembly of Despotovac:

| Party | Seats |
|---|---|
| Democratic Party of Serbia–New Serbia–United Serbia | 14 |
| Democratic Party–Liberals of Serbia | 13 |
| Serbian Radical Party | 7 |
| G17 Plus | 5 |
| Party of United Pensioners of Serbia | 3 |
| Socialist Party of Serbia | 2 |
| Liberal Democratic Party | 1 |
| Total | 45 |
Source: Only parties or alliances that won seats are listed.

===== Doljevac =====
Elections were held in Doljevac on 1 October 2006 to elect members of the municipal assembly. The results do not appear to be available online. Goran Ljubić's status as mayor was not affected, and the next local assembly elections took place as part of the regular cycle in 2008.

===== Kraljevo =====
Radoslav Jović resigned as mayor of Kraljevo on 24 November 2006. A by-election to choose his replacement was held over two rounds on 5 and 19 February 2006. The results were as follows:

2006 Municipality of Kraljevo local by-election: Mayor of Kraljevo
| Candidate | Party | First round | | Second round | |
| Candidate | Party | Votes | % | Votes | % |
|---|---|---|---|---|---|
| Dr. Miloš Babić | New Serbia–Velimir Ilić | 14,509 | 42.07 | 20,068 | 76.84 |
| Miljko Četrović | Serbian Radical Party | 5,477 | 15.88 | 6,048 | 23.16 |
| Slobodan Mihajlović | Democratic Party–Boris Tadić | 3,658 | 10.61 | | |
| Zvonko Obradović | G17 Plus | 2,947 | 8.54 | | |
| Mirko Vuković | Serbian Renewal Movement | 2,674 | 7.75 | | |
| Prof. Dr. Dragoslav Kočović | Socialist Party of Serbia | 1,713 | 4.97 | | |
| Đorđe Pavlović | Strength of Serbia Movement–Bogoljub Karić | 1,622 | 4.70 | | |
| Dr. Zoran Miljković | Citizens' Group: Movement: Kraljevo Above All | 1,336 | 3.87 | | |
| Zoran Jovanović | People's Party | 553 | 1.60 | | |
| Total | | 34,489 | 100.00 | 26,116 | 100.00 |
| Valid votes | | 34,489 | 98.51 | 26,116 | 98.46 |
| Invalid/blank votes | | 523 | 1.49 | 409 | 1.54 |
| Total votes | | 35,012 | 100.00 | 26,525 | 100.00 |
| Registered voters/turnout | | 102,152 | 34.27 | 102,152 | 25.97 |

===== Nova Varoš =====
Nova Varoš mayor Branislav Dilparić, a member of the Socialist Party of Serbia, won a recall election on 25 June 2006. The result of the vote was:

| Choice | Votes | % |
|---|---|---|
| No on recall | | 62.93 |
| Yes on recall | | 36 |
| Total valid votes | | 100 |

===== Novi Pazar =====
The 2004 elections in Novi Pazar produced a divided government: Sulejman Ugljanin of the Party of Democratic Action of Sandžak was elected as mayor, but his party did not command a majority in the assembly and the rival Sandžak Democratic Party was able to form a coalition administration.

The government of Serbia introduced a provisional administration to Novi Pazar in April 2006 on the grounds that the assembly did not adopt the budget within the legal deadline. A new assembly election was scheduled for 10 September 2006.

At the time this happened, there was already an effort underway to recall Ugljanin as mayor. This effort ended in chaos, with two separate votes taking place. The first recall election, held on 14 May 2006, was organized by an election commission appointed by the former SDP-led administration. In this vote, ninety-eight per cent of voters supported recall. The second election, held on 25 June 2006, was held by a commission appointed by the interim government, and in this vote about ninety-seven per cent of voters opposed recall. Ultimately, Ugljanin was not removed from office.

The results of the municipal assembly election were as follows:

| Party | Votes | % | Seats |
|---|---|---|---|
| Coalition: List for Sandžak Dr. Sulejman Ugljanin | 19,071 | 53.42 | 27 |
| Together for Novi Pazar (SDP, DS, G17 Plus–Mirsad Đerlek) | 8,369 | 23.44 | 12 |
| Democratic Party of Serbia–New Serbia–Dr. Vojislav Koštunica–Mr. Velimir Ilić | 2,580 | 7.23 | 4 |
| Serbian Radical Party | 1,572 | 4.40 | 2 |
| Liberal Democratic Party–Čeda Jovanović | 1,306 | 3.66 | 2 |
| Party for Sandžak Fevzija Murić | 1,001 | 2.80 | – |
| Bosniak Coalition: Sandžak Alternative, Sandžak Democratic Union | 724 | 2.03 | – |
| Citizens' Group: Serbian Democratic Alliance | 705 | 1.97 | – |
| Party of United Pensioners of Serbia–Žarko Kovačević | 199 | 0.56 | – |
| Strength of Serbia Movement–Bogoljub Karić | 174 | 0.49 | – |
| Total | 35,701 | 100.00 | 47 |
| Valid votes | 35,701 | 98.44 | |
| Invalid/blank votes | 567 | 1.56 | |
| Total votes | 36,268 | 100.00 | |
| Registered voters/turnout | 69,061 | 52.52 | |

Ahmedin Škrijelj of the Party of Democratic Action of Sandžak was among the candidates elected on the list of the List for Sandžak.

===== Ražanj =====
Ražanj mayor Životije Popović was defeated in a recall election on 30 April 2006.

| Choice | Votes | % |
|---|---|---|
| Yes on recall | 2,348 | 55.65 |
| No on recall | 1,871 | 44.35 |
| Total valid votes | 4,219 | 100 |

New assembly elections had originally been scheduled for later in the year, as the previous elections had been held in 2002. Following Popović's defeat in the recall vote, the assembly elections were brought forward by a few months to coincide with the new mayoral election. Both elections took place on 25 June 2006. The second round of voting in the mayoral election took place on 9 July 2006.

2006 Municipality of Ražanj local by-election: Mayor of Ražanj
| Candidate | Party | First round | | Second round | |
| Candidate | Party | Votes | % | Votes | % |
|---|---|---|---|---|---|
| Dobrica Stojković | Democratic Party of Serbia–New Serbia–United Serbia | | 46.70 | 3,425 | 65.76 |
| Rodoljub Mitić | Democratic Party | | 26.24 | 1,783 | 34.24 |
| other candidates | | | | | |
| Total | | | | 5,208 | 100.00 |

Results of the election for the Municipal Assembly of Ražanj:

| Party | Seats |
|---|---|
| Democratic Party of Serbia–New Serbia–United Serbia | 11 |
| Democratic Party | 7 |
| Party of United Pensioners of Serbia | 3 |
| Socialist Party of Serbia | 2 |
| G17 Plus | 2 |
| Serbian Radical Party | 2 |
| Serbian Renewal Movement | 1 |
| Strength of Serbia Movement | 1 |
| Liberal Democratic Party | 1 |
| Citizens' Group: Verislav Velisavljević "Verče" | 1 |
| Total | 31 |
Source: Only parties or alliances that won seats are listed.

===== Sjenica =====
Sjenica mayor Esad Zornić of the Sandžak Democratic Party won a recall election on 27 August 2006.

| Choice | Votes | % |
|---|---|---|
| No on recall | 6,220 | 53.16 |
| Yes on recall | 5,480 | 46.84 |
| Total valid votes | 11,700 | 100 |

The municipal assembly of Sjenica had been dissolved earlier in the year, and a new assembly election took place on 10 September 2006. Notwithstanding Zornić's victory in the mayoral contest, the List for Sandžak won an outright majority victory in the vote.

===== Smederevo =====
Jasna Avramović, who had been elected as mayor in the 2004 Serbian local elections, was defeated in a recall election in late 2005. A by-election to determine her successor was held over two rounds on 12 February and 5 March 2006. The results were as follows:

2006 Municipality of Smederevo local by-election: Mayor of Smederevo
| Candidate | Party | First round | | Second round | |
| Candidate | Party | Votes | % | Votes | % |
|---|---|---|---|---|---|
| Saša Radosavljević | Democratic Party of Serbia | 6,102 | | 16,428 | 53.38 |
| Predrag Umičević | Democratic Party | 7,577 | | 14,349 | 46.62 |
| Dragan Čolić | Serbian Radical Party | 5,825 | | | |
| Tomislav Petrović | Liberal Democratic Party | | | | |
| Dejan Reljić | Strength of Serbia Movement | | | | |
| Bogoljub Spasojević | Citizens' Group: For a Better Village, For a Better City | | | | |
| Slaviša Stevanović | Citizens' Group: Coalition for a Better Smederevo | | | | |
| Vladimir Todorović | Citizens' Group: Movement for Smederevo | | | | |
| Dušan Trajković | G17 Plus | | | | |
| Zoran Zarić | Socialist Party of Serbia | | | | |
| Total | | | | 30,777 | 100.00 |

===== Užice =====
Miroslav Martić of the Democratic Party, who had been elected as mayor of Užice in the 2004 local elections, was defeated in a recall vote held on 21 May 2006. The results were:

| Choice | Votes | % |
|---|---|---|
| Yes on recall | 9,556 | 54.20 |
| No on recall | 8,076 | 45.80 |
| Total valid votes | 17,632 | 100 |

A by-election to determine a new mayor subsequently took place over two rounds on 2 and 16 July 2006. Municipal assembly president Petar Ristović of the Serbian Renewal Movement served as interim mayor during this time.

The results of the by-election were as follows:

2006 Municipality of Užice by-election: Mayor of Užice
| Candidate | Party | First round | | Second round | |
| Candidate | Party | Votes | % | Votes | % |
|---|---|---|---|---|---|
| Tihomir Petković | Coalition: Democratic Party of Serbia–G17 Plus–New Serbia (Affiliation: Democratic Party of Serbia) | 5,899 | 26.69 | 9,566 | 53.26 |
| Milomir Sredojević | Coalition: Best for Užice Democratic Party–Serbian Renewal Movement–Social Democratic Party (Affiliation: Democratic Party) | 4,254 | 19.24 | 8,394 | 46.74 |
| Dragiša Stanojčić | Serbian Radical Party | 3,864 | 17.48 | | |
| Milovan Petrović | Citizen's Group: For a More Beautiful and Richer Užice | 3,395 | 15.36 | | |
| Dragoljub Kostić | Citizens' Group: League for Užice | 3,117 | 14.10 | | |
| Jovan Mirosavljević | Liberal Democratic Party | 964 | 4.36 | | |
| Veličko Mićović | Civic Alliance of Serbia | 355 | 1.61 | | |
| Blagoje Radojičić | Serbian Democratic Renewal Movement | 258 | 1.17 | | |
| Total | | 22,106 | 100.00 | 17,960 | 100.00 |
| Valid votes | | 22,106 | 99.00 | 18,314 | 98.10 |
| Invalid/blank votes | | 224 | 1.00 | 354 | 1.90 |
| Total votes | | 22,330 | 100.00 | 18,668 | 100.00 |
| Registered voters/turnout | | 69,418 | 32.17 | 69,418 | 26.89 |
Source: Apparent minor errors in both sources have been corrected.

=== 2007 ===
==== Vojvodina ====
===== Srbobran =====
Srbobran mayor Branko Gajin won a recall election on 12 June 2007. The vote to remove him had been initiated by the Serbian Radical Party (SRS).

The preliminary results of the vote were as follows:

| Choice | Votes | % |
|---|---|---|
| No on recall | 3,942 | 67.40 |
| Yes on recall | 1,907 | 32.60 |
| Total valid votes | 5,849 | 100 |

==== Central Serbia (excluding Belgrade) ====
===== Bogatić =====
Bogatić mayor Radenko Petrić won a recall election on 11 March 2007.

===== Krupanj =====
Sitting mayor Zoran Grujičić of the Democratic Party was defeated in a recall election on 21 January 2007. A by-election to choose his successor was held over two rounds on 1 and 15 April 2007.

2007 Municipality of Krupanj local by-election: Mayor of Krupanj
| Candidate | Party | First round | | Second round | |
| Candidate | Party | Votes | % | Votes | % |
|---|---|---|---|---|---|
| Budimir Stefanović | Democratic Party of Serbia–New Serbia–G17 Plus (Affiliation: Democratic Party of Serbia) | | 35 | | 56.69 |
| Božidar Isailović | Socialist Party of Serbia | | 24 | | 42.44 |
| Saša Bogdanović | Serbian Radical Party | | 16 | | |
| Lazar Ranković | Democratic Party | | 16 | | |
| Predrag Dimitrić | Citizens' Group: Movement for Rađevina | | 4 | | |
| Total | | | | | |

===== Svilajnac =====
Svilajnac mayor Dobrivoje Budimirović won a recall election on 2 September 2007.

| Choice | Votes | % |
|---|---|---|
| No on recall | 5,940 | 51.17 |
| Yes on recall | 5,668 | 48.83 |
| Total valid votes | 11,608 | 100 |
