= Vuk Radojević =

Serbian economist (born 1978)

- Вук Радојевић

President of Municipality of Bečej
- Incumbent
- Assumed office 18 April 2023
- Preceded by: Dragan Tošić

Secretary of agriculture, water management, and forestry
- In office 20 June 2016 – 29 October 2020
- Preceded by: Daniel Petrović
- Succeeded by: Čedomir Božić

Personal details
- Born: 31 January 1978 Bečej, SAP Vojvodina, SR Serbia, SFR Yugoslavia
- Party: Serbian Progressive Party (SNS)

Vuk Radojević (Serbian Cyrillic: Вук Радојевић; born 31 January 1978) is a Serbian agrarian economist and politician who has served as President of Municipality of Bečej since 2023. He previously served as Secretary of agriculture, water management, and forestry in the Government of Vojvodina from 2016 to 2020. Radojević is a member of the Serbian Progressive Party.

== Early life and private career ==
Radojević was born on 31 January 1978 in Bečej, SAP Vojvodina, SR Serbia, SFR Yugoslavia. He was raised in the community and subsequently earned a bachelor's degree (2002), master's degree (2007), and Ph.D. (2018) from the University of Novi Sad's Faculty of Agriculture, focusing on the field of agroeconomy. His master's thesis considered export opportunities of agro-industrial products to the European Union.

== Politician ==
Radojević sought election to the Assembly of Vojvodina in the 2012 provincial election in the Bečej electoral division. He was defeated in the second round.

He also appeared in the lead position on a coalition electoral list for the Bečej municipal assembly in the concurrent 2012 Serbian local elections and was elected when the list won eight mandates. The Democratic Party won a minority victory in election, but the Progressives were able to form coalition government with the Alliance of Vojvodina Hungarians with Radojević as mayor. He served in this role for the next four years, led the Progressive alliance to win a majority in Municipality of Bečej in the 2016 Serbian local elections, and was chosen for a second term as mayor following the election.

His second term as mayor was very brief; days after the appointment, a new government of Vojvodina was announced and Radojević was named as provincial agriculture minister. In October 2016, he announced loans of 132 million dinars to agricultural producers. In subsequent years, he travelled to Israel and Cyprus to discuss potential agricultural investments in Serbia and Vojvodina. In an interview toward the end of his term in 2020, he said that more young people in Serbia were becoming involved with agricultural production. He stood down from the provincial cabinet after the 2020 Vojvodina provincial election.

Radojević again led the Progressive Party's coalition list for Bečej in the 2020 Serbian local elections but was not elected as the President of Municipality when the list won another majority victory. After Dragan Tošić, President of Municipality, died Radojević was appointed as the new president in April 2023.

== Electoral record ==
=== Provincial (Vojvodina) ===
2012 Vojvodina assembly election Bečej (constituency seat) - First and Second Rounds
Candidate	Party or Coalition	Votes	%	Votes	%
Slobodan Zlokolica	Choice for a Better Vojvodina–Bojan Pajtić	3,382	18.67	10,410	64.68
Vuk Radojević	Let's Get Vojvodina Moving–Tomislav Nikolić (Serbian Progressive Party, New Serbia, Movement of Socialists, Strength of Serbia Movement) (Affiliation: Serbian Progressive Party)	2,881	15.91	5,685	35.32
Laslo Feher	Alliance of Vojvodina Hungarians	2,634	14.54		
Zoltan Guljaš	"Miša Vrebalov–U-Turn"	1,981	10.94		
Milica Gobelić	Democratic Party of Serbia	1,484	8.19		
Jelena Češljević	Socialist Party of Serbia (SPS)–Party of United Pensioners of Serbia (PUPS)–United Serbia (JS)–Social Democratic Party of Serbia (SDP Srbije)	1,167	6.44		
Dragan Živkov	Serbian Radical Party	972	5.37		
Vera Guljaš	League of Social Democrats of Vojvodina–Nenad Čanak	797	4.40		
Igor Kiš	Democratic Party of Vojvodina Hungarians	787	4.35		
István Tari	Democratic Fellowship of Vojvodina Hungarians–VMDK	707	3.90		
Zubcsik Gábor	Hungarian Hope Movement	477	2.63		
Čila Mešter-Kuti	Hungarian Civic Alliance	476	2.63		
Magdolna Šlajf	United Regions of Serbia–Mlađan Dinkić	366	2.02		
Total valid votes		18,111	100	16,095	100
