= Jovan Palalić =

Serbian politician

Jovan Palalić (Serbian Cyrillic: Јован Палалић; born 26 April 1971) is a politician in Serbia. He has served several terms in the National Assembly of Serbia. Once a prominent member of the Democratic Party of Serbia (Demokratska stranka Srbije, DSS), Palalić is now the general secretary of the Serbian People's Party (Srpska narodna partija, SNP).

== Early life and career ==
Palalić was born in Bačka Palanka, in what was then the Socialist Autonomous Province of Vojvodina in the Socialist Republic of Serbia, Socialist Federal Republic of Yugoslavia. He is a graduate of the University of Novi Sad Faculty of Law.

== Politician ==
=== Democratic Party of Serbia ===
Palalić received the forty-fifth position on the DSS's electoral list in the 2003 Serbian parliamentary election. The list won fifty-three mandates, and he was included in the party's delegation for the sitting of parliament that followed. (From 2000 to 2011, Serbian parliamentary mandates were awarded to sponsoring parties or coalitions rather than to individual candidates, and it was common practice for mandates to be awarded out of numerical order. Palalić did not automatically receive a mandate by virtue of his list position, but he was awarded a mandate all the same.) The DSS formed a coalition government with other parties, and Palalić served on the government side. He chaired the committee on the judiciary and administration from 2004 to 2006.

Palalić was also the DSS's candidate for mayor of Bačka Palanka in the 2004 Serbian local elections; he finished third. The municipal assembly was not legally constituted after this election, and another assembly election was held the following year. The DSS won four seats, and Palalić served with the party's delegation.

Palalić was president of the DSS's executive committee from 2005 to 2010 and chief of the party's campaign staff in the 2007 parliamentary election, which the party contested in an alliance with New Serbia. Their combined list won forty-seven mandates, and Palalić, who received the thirty-third position, was again included in his party's assembly delegation. He subsequently represented the DSS in talks with Serbian president Boris Tadić on the formation of a new ministry. The DSS remained in government during the sitting of parliament that followed, and Palalić chaired the committee on local self-government.

He received the eighteenth position on another combined DSS–New Serbia list in the 2008 election and received a mandate for a third term after the list won thirty mandates. The DSS moved into opposition after the election, when a new coalition government was formed under the leadership of the rival Democratic Party (Demokratska stranka, DS). Palalić continued to chair the local self-government committee.

Palalić opposed a state visit by Joseph Biden to Serbia in 2009, accusing the American vice-president of being anti-Serb. He spoke against the prospect of Serbia joining the North Atlantic Treaty Organization (NATO) at the same time, saying, "Serbia has no place in an organization that bombed Serbia and the [ Republika Srpska ], occupied Kosovo-Metohija, and supported the independence of that phoney state." He later opposed a 2010 resolution by the Serbian assembly apologizing for the Srebrenica massacre, on the grounds that it inappropriately placed blame on Serbs as a people. He was quoted as saying, "This will put a burden on all future generations in Serbia, by saying that Serbia is responsible and failed to prevent everything that happened in Srebrenica."

Serbia's electoral system was reformed in 2011, such that parliamentary mandates were awarded in numerical order to candidates on successful lists. Palalić received the eighteenth position on the DSS's list in the 2012 parliamentary election and was re-elected when the list won twenty-one mandates. The party once again served in opposition. He was promoted to the eleventh position on the party's list for the 2014 election but was not re-elected when the party failed to cross the electoral threshold needed to win representation in the assembly. He subsequently left the DSS.

=== Serbian People's Party ===
In September 2014, Palalić joined with other former DSS officials to form the Serbian People's Party. The party contested the 2016 parliamentary election in an alliance with the Serbian Progressive Party. Palalić received the forty-third position on the Progressive-led Aleksandar Vučić – Serbia Is Winning list and was easily re-elected when the list won a landslide majority with 131 out of 250 seats. Three SNP candidates were elected in the 2016 election; all served as members the Progressive Party's parliamentary group. In the 2016–20 parliament, Palalić was a member of the assembly's foreign affairs committee and the committee on the judiciary, public administration, and local self-government; a member of Serbia's delegation to the parliamentary assembly of the Collective Security Treaty Organization (where Serbia has observer status); the head of Serbia's parliamentary friendship group with Liechtenstein; and a member of the parliamentary friendship groups with Armenia, Belarus, China, France, Greece, Italy, Kazakhstan, Russia, Spain, and Switzerland.

Like others in the Serbian People's Party, Palalić holds national conservative views on domestic and foreign policy issues. In a 2019 interview with the right-wing Italian journal Oltre la Linea, he indicated his support for the Lega party as well as for Marine Le Pen's National Rally in France and Hungary's Fidesz party. In the same interview, he described Kosovo as "a Christian territory" and added he considered it to be an occupied territory at present.

Palalić again received the forty-third position on the Progressive Party's list in the 2020 Serbian parliamentary election and was elected to a sixth term when the list won a landslide majority with 188 mandates. He is now a member of the committee on constitutional and legislative issues and a deputy member of the foreign affairs committee and the committee on Kosovo-Metohija. He continues to serve in Serbia's delegation to Collective Security Treaty Organization assembly, chairs the parliamentary friendship group with Italy, and he is a member of the friendship groups with Armenia, the Bahamas, Belgium, Botswana, Cameroon, the Central African Republic, Comoros, the Dominican Republic, Ecuador, Equatorial Guinea, Eritrea, France, Grenada, Guinea-Bissau, the Holy See, Jamaica, Kyrgyzstan, Laos, Liberia, Liechtenstein, Madagascar, Mali, Mauritius, Mozambique, Nauru, Nicaragua, Nigeria, Palau, Papua New Guinea, Paraguay, the Republic of Congo, Russia, Saint Vincent and the Grenadines, Sao Tome and Principe, the Solomon Islands, South Sudan, Spain, Sri Lanka, Sudan, Suriname, Switzerland, Togo, Trinidad and Tobago, Uruguay, and Uzbekistan.

== Electoral Record ==
=== Municipal (Bačka Palanka) ===
2004 Bačka Palanka municipal election Mayor of Bačka Palanka
Dragan Bozalo	Serbian Radical Party	4,952	27.94	6,233	51.16
Slobodan Škorić	Socialist Party of Serbia	2,717	15.33	5,951	48.84
Jovan Palalić	Democratic Party of Serbia	2,645	14.92		
Kosta Stakić	Democratic Party	2,503	14.12		
Milutin Rujević	Strength of Serbia Movement	1,733	9.78		
Goran Milošev	New Serbia	951	5.37		
Slobodan Stojnović	Serbian Renewal Movement	911	5.14		
Bogoljub Trkulja	Citizens' Group	740	4.17		
Tatjana Drobac	Christian Democratic Party of Serbia	573	3.23		
Total valid votes		17,725	100	12,184	100
