= Umičević =

Umičević is a surname. Notable people with the surname include:

- Dragan Umičević (born 1984), Swedish ice hockey player
- Predrag Umičević (born 1963), Serbian engineer
