= Kosta Stakić =

Serbian political figure

Kosta Stakić (Serbian Cyrillic: Коста Стакић; born 5 April 1966) is a wine producer and former politician in Serbia. He served in the Assembly of Vojvodina from 2008 to 2012 and was the mayor of Bačka Palanka from 2008 to 2010. During his time as an elected official, Stakić was a member of the Democratic Party (Demokratska stranka, DS).

== Early life and career ==
Stakić is a graduated economist. He was raised in a family of wine producers in Neštin, a village in the Bačka Palanka municipality, and has expanded his family's business. In a 2010 interview, he was described as owning twenty-two thousand vines, used for producing Cabernet Sauvignon, Riesling, Vranac and Black Muscat. He also owns several apple, pear, peach, and apricot trees; his harvest in 2010 amounted to over one hundred tons of fruit.

== Politician ==
=== Municipal politics ===
Serbia introduced the direct election of mayors in the 2004 local elections, and Stakić was the DS's candidate in Bačka Palanka. He finished fourth against Dragan Bozalo of the Serbian Radical Party. Members of the Bačka Palanka municipal assembly were elected in the same cycle, but the assembly was not legally constituted afterwards. Another assembly election was held the following year; the Democratic Party won eight seats, and Stakić served with his party's assembly delegation.

The direct election of mayors was abandoned after the 2004 election. Stakić appeared in the lead position on the DS's For a European Serbia electoral list for Bačka Palanka in the 2008 local elections and led the party's assembly delegation after the list won sixteen mandates, finishing a close second against the Radical Party. In the immediate aftermath of the election, the Radicals formed a new coalition government with the Socialist Party of Serbia and the Democratic Party of Serbia (Demokratska stranka Srbije, DSS), and Dragan Bozalo continued as mayor. In November 2008, however, the DS formed a new coalition that included both the Socialists and the DSS, and Stakić was chosen as mayor in his place. While in office, he attempted to deal with a long-standing issue of residents in the villages of Neštin and Vizić facing legal hurdles when crossing Croatian territory to access the rest of Bačka Palanka.

He remained in office for a year and a half; in April 2010, the Radicals formed a new coalition with the DSS (following the defection of a For a European Serbia delegate), and Bozalo returned to office again. Stakić did not seek re-election to the municipal assembly in 2012.

=== Provincial politics ===
From 2004 to 2016, Vojvodina used a system of mixed proportional representation for provincial elections: half the delegates were chosen by election in single-member constituencies, and the other half were chosen by proportional representation on electoral lists. Stakić was elected for the Bačka Palanka constituency in the 2008 Vojvodina provincial election, defeating Bozalo in the second round of voting. The Democrats and their allies won a majority government, and Stakić served as a supporter of the administration.

In the 2012 provincial election, he appeared in the thirty-fourth position on the DS's Choice for a Better Vojvodina list. The list won sixteen proportional mandates, and Stakić was not elected. He has not sought a return to politics since this time.

== Electoral record ==
=== Provincial (Vojvodina) ===
2008 Vojvodina assembly election Bačka Palanka (constituency seat) - First and Second Rounds
Kosta Stakić	For a European Vojvodina Democratic Party–G17 Plus, Boris Tadić (Affiliation: Democratic Party)	8,038	27.99	8,547	51.39
Dragan Bozalo (incumbent)	Serbian Radical Party	10,701	37.26	8,085	48.61
Milorad Jović Mika	Socialist Party of Serbia (SPS) Party of United Pensioners of Serbia (PUPS)	3,346	11.65		
Janko Čobrda	Coalition: "Together for Vojvodina–Nenad Čanak"	2,630	9.16		
Goran Šatara	Democratic Party of Serbia–New Serbia	2,464	8.58		
Aleksandar Borocki	Liberal Democratic Party	1,537	5.35		
Total valid votes		28,716	100	16,632	100
Invalid ballots		1,353		344	
Total votes casts		30,069	61.12	16,976	34.51

=== Municipal (Bačka Palanka) ===
2004 Bačka Palanka municipal election Mayor of Bačka Palanka
Dragan Bozalo	Serbian Radical Party	4,952	27.94	6,233	51.16
Slobodan Škorić	Socialist Party of Serbia	2,717	15.33	5,951	48.84
Jovan Palalić	Democratic Party of Serbia	2,645	14.92		
Kosta Stakić	Democratic Party	2,503	14.12		
Milutin Rujević	Strength of Serbia Movement	1,733	9.78		
Goran Milošev	New Serbia	951	5.37		
Slobodan Stojnović	Serbian Renewal Movement	911	5.14		
Bogoljub Trkulja	Citizens' Group	740	4.17		
Tatjana Drobac	Christian Democratic Party of Serbia	573	3.23		
Total valid votes		17,725	100	12,184	100
