= Dragan Bozalo =

Serbian politician (born 1970)

Dragan Bozalo (Serbian Cyrillic: Драган Бозало; born 1 February 1970) is a politician in Serbia. He has served in National Assembly of Serbia, the Assembly of Serbia and Montenegro, and the Assembly of Vojvodina, and was the mayor of Bačka Palanka for three terms. He is currently a member of the Municipal Assembly of Bačka Palanka. Bozalo is a member of the far-right Serbian Radical Party (Srpska radikalna stranka, SRS).

== Early life and career ==
Bozalo was born in Bačka Palanka, in what was then the Socialist Autonomous Province of Vojvodina in the Socialist Republic of Serbia, Socialist Federal Republic of Yugoslavia. He is a chemical technician in private life.

== Politician ==
=== Parliamentarian ===
Bozalo became president of the Radical Party's municipal board in Bačka Palanka during the 1990s. He appeared in the first position on the party's electoral list for the Vrbas division (which included Bačka Palanka) in the 1997 Serbian parliamentary election and was elected when the list won three mandates in the division. (From 1992 to 2000, Serbia's electoral law stipulated that one-third of parliamentary mandates would be assigned to candidates from successful lists in numerical order, while the remaining two-thirds would be distributed amongst other candidates on the lists at the discretion of the sponsoring parties. Bozalo automatically received a mandate by virtue of his list position.) The election was won by the Socialist Party of Serbia and its allies, and the Radicals initially served in opposition. The Socialists subsequently formed a coalition government with the Radicals and the Yugoslav Left in early 1998, and Bozalo served as a supporter of the administration.

The Socialist-led administration in Serbia fell after Slobodan Milošević's defeat in the 2000 Yugoslavian presidential election, and a new Serbian parliamentary election was scheduled for December 2000. For this election, the entire country was counted as a single electoral division and all mandates were assigned to candidates on successful lists at the discretion of the sponsoring parties or coalitions, irrespective of the numerical order. Bozalo appeared in the seventy-first position on the Radical list. The list won twenty-three seats, and he was not included in the party's delegation.

Bozalo was given the fortieth position on the Radical Party's list in the 2003 Serbian parliamentary election. The party won eighty-two seats on this occasion, emerging as the largest group in the assembly but ultimately falling well short of a majority and serving in opposition. Bozalo was included in his party's delegation when the assembly met in early 2004, although his second term in the republican parliament was brief. By virtue of its performance in the 2003 parliamentary election, the Radicals won the right to appoint thirty members to the federal Assembly of Serbia and Montenegro. Bozalo was appointed to the federal assembly and so resigned his seat in the national assembly on 12 February 2004. He served at the federal level for the next two years. The Assembly of Serbia and Montenegro ceased to exist in 2006, when Montenegro declared independence.

Bozalo also appeared on the Radical Party's lists in the 2007 and 2008 parliamentary elections, although he was not included in its delegation on either occasion.

The Radical Party experienced a serious split following the 2008 election, with several of its members joining the more moderate Serbian Progressive Party under the leadership of Tomislav Nikolić and Aleksandar Vučić. Bozalo remained with the Radicals.

Serbia's electoral system was reformed again in 2011, such that mandates were awarded in numerical order to candidates on successful lists. Bozalo appeared in the ninety-fourth position on the Radical party's list in the 2012 Serbian parliamentary election, the fifty-sixth position in the 2014 election, and the 123rd position in the 2020 Serbian parliamentary election. On each occasion, the party failed to cross the electoral threshold to win representation in the assembly.

=== Provincial politics ===
Bozalo sought election to the Assembly of Vojvodina for Bačka Palanka's third division in the 2000 Vojvodina provincial election. He lost to Petar Pešić of the Democratic Opposition of Serbia. This was the last provincial election in Vojvodina held exclusively by voting in single-member constituencies; after the election, the province adopted a system of mixed proportional representation, in which half the delegates were elected in constituencies and the other half by proportional representation on electoral lists.

Bozalo was elected to the provincial assembly in the 2004 provincial election, winning the Bačka Palanka constituency seat in the second round. The Democratic Party (Demokratska stranka, DS) and its allies won the election, and Bozalo served as an opposition member for the next four years. He was defeated in his bid for re-election the 2008 provincial election.

He appeared in the seventeenth position on the Radical Party's list in the 2012 provincial election and was not elected when the party won five mandates. Following this election, Vojvodina switched to a system of full proportional representation. Bozalo was given the twentieth position in the 2016 provincial election and missed election when the list won ten mandates.

Bozalo received the eleventh position on the Radical Party's list in the 2020 Vojvodina provincial election. The party won four seats, and he was once again not returned. It is possible, although unlikely, that he could re-enter the assembly in the current term as the replacement for another Radical Party member.

=== Municipal politics ===
Bozalo sought election to the Bačka Palanka Municipal Assembly in the 2000 Serbian local elections, running in the twenty-seventh division. The Radicals did not win any seats in the assembly. This was the last Serbian municipal electoral cycle to have constituency elections; all subsequent cycles have been held under proportional representation.

Serbia introduced the direct election of mayors for the 2004 Serbian local elections. Bozalo stood as the Radical Party's candidate for mayor in Bačka Palanka and was elected over a candidate of the Socialist Party in the second round. He served for the next four years; during this time, the Radical Party also won a special off-year election for the municipal assembly in December 2005.

The direct election of mayors was abandoned after 2004. Bozalo led the Radical Party to a narrow plurality victory in Bačka Palanka in the 2008 Serbian local elections and was appointed by the assembly to a second term as mayor after forming a coalition government with the Socialist Party of Serbia and the Democratic Party of Serbia (Demokratska stranka Srbije, DSS). Subsequently, however, both the Socialists and the DSS left their alliance with the Radicals to form a new coalition government with the Democratic Party (DS), and Bozalo stood down as mayor on 3 November 2008. He returned to office in April 2010 after forming in a new coalition with the DSS and served the remainder of the term. Party differences notwithstanding, Bozalo has said that he had an improved relationship with the DS-led provincial government during his final term as mayor.

The Radicals finished in fourth place in Bačka Palanka in the 2012 local elections with seven seats out of forty-two, having lost much of their support to the Progressive Party. The Socialists and the Progressives formed a new administration after the election, and the Radicals moved to opposition. Bozalo appeared in the lead position on the Radical list and was elected as a member of the assembly.

Bozalo has continued to lead the Radicals in Bačka Palanka since standing down as mayor. The party won four seats in the 2016 local elections and two seats in the 2020 local elections, and has remained in opposition throughout this period. Bozalo continues to serve as a member of the municipal assembly as of 2021.

== Electoral record ==
=== Provincial (Vojvodina) ===
2008 Vojvodina assembly election Bačka Palanka (constituency seat) - First and Second Rounds
Kosta Stakić	For a European Vojvodina Democratic Party–G17 Plus, Boris Tadić (Affiliation: Democratic Party)	8,038	27.99	8,547	51.39
Dragan Bozalo (incumbent)	Serbian Radical Party	10,701	37.26	8,085	48.61
Milorad Jović Mika	Socialist Party of Serbia (SPS) Party of United Pensioners of Serbia (PUPS)	3,346	11.65		
Janko Čobrda	Coalition: "Together for Vojvodina–Nenad Čanak"	2,630	9.16		
Goran Šatara	Democratic Party of Serbia–New Serbia	2,464	8.58		
Aleksandar Borocki	Liberal Democratic Party	1,537	5.35		
Total valid votes		28,716	100	16,632	100
Invalid ballots		1,353		344	
Total votes casts		30,069	61.12	16,976	34.51

2004 Vojvodina assembly election Bačka Palanka (constituency seat) - First and Second Rounds
Dragan Bozalo	Serbian Radical Party	5,009	28.59	6,325	52.18
Mila Višekruna	Socialist Party of Serbia	2,533	14.46	5,796	47.82
Đorđe Jamušakov	Democratic Party–Boris Tadić	2,167	12.37		
Slobodan Gvozdenović	Democratic Party of Serbia	1,990	11.36		
Milan Mirković	Serbian Renewal Movement	1,656	9.45		
Petar Pešić (incumbent)	Together for Vojvodina–Nenad Čanak	908	5.18		
Vladimir Grujić	G17 Plus	847	4.83		
Jovo Radoš	Citizens' Group	757	4.32		
Stanko Lazendić	Clean Hands of Vojvodina: Reformists of Vojvodina–Slovak Center–Otpor	521	2.97		
Nenad Višekruna	New Serbia	498	2.84		
Marinko Srebro	Citizens' Group: "Srebro Marinko"	364	2.08		
Rade Mihajlović	Serbian People's Movement	271	1.55		
Total valid votes		17,521	100	12,121	100
Invalid ballots		783		190	
Total votes casts		18,304	38.57	12,796	26.96

=== Municipal (Bačka Palanka) ===
2004 Bačka Palanka municipal election Mayor of Bačka Palanka
Dragan Bozalo	Serbian Radical Party	4,952	27.94	6,233	51.16
Slobodan Škorić	Socialist Party of Serbia	2,717	15.33	5,951	48.84
Jovan Palalić	Democratic Party of Serbia	2,645	14.92		
Kosta Stakić	Democratic Party	2,503	14.12		
Milutin Rujević	Strength of Serbia Movement	1,733	9.78		
Goran Milošev	New Serbia	951	5.37		
Slobodan Stojnović	Serbian Renewal Movement	911	5.14		
Bogoljub Trkulja	Citizens' Group	740	4.17		
Tatjana Drobac	Christian Democratic Party of Serbia	573	3.23		
Total valid votes		17,725	100	12,184	100
