= József Varga (Vojvodina politician) =

Serbian politician

József F. Varga (Serbian: Јожеф Ф. Варга, romanized: Jožef F. Varga; born 22 February 1959) is a former politician in Serbia from the country's Hungarian community. He was a member of the Assembly of Vojvodina from 1992 to 2004 and has held prominent municipal office in Bečej.

== Private career ==
Varga is from Bačko Petrovo Selo in Bečej. He is a workplace safety engineer and has been president of the community's volunteer fire department for many years.

== Politician ==
=== Assembly of Vojvodina ===
Varga entered political life as a member of the Democratic Fellowship of Vojvodina Hungarians (Demokratska zajednica vojvođanskih Mađara, DZVM), which was at the time the dominant political party representing Hungarians in the province. He was elected to the Assembly of Vojvodina for Bečej's first electoral division under its banner in the May 1992 provincial election and was re-elected for the same constituency in the December 1992 election. During this period, politics in Vojvodina and Serbia generally were dominated by the Socialist Party of Serbia.

The DZVM experienced a serious split in 1994, and several prominent members joined the breakaway Alliance of Vojvodina Hungarians (Savez vojvođanskih Mađara, SVM), which ultimately replaced the DZVM as the main party of the community. Varga joined the SVM and was re-elected under its banner in the 1996 provincial election.

The SVM contested the 2000 provincial election as part of the Democratic Opposition of Serbia (DOS), a broad and ideologically diverse coalition of parties opposed to the authoritarian rule of Slobodan Milošević. The DOS won a landslide majority, and Varga was elected to a fourth term. He was the deputy leader of the SVM group in the sitting of the assembly that followed.

As a leading representative of Vojvodina's Hungarian community, Varga condemned a June 2004 incident in Temerin in which a group of Hungarians attacked a Serb in an apparent hate crime. Varga described the attackers as "hooligans" and called for appropriate punishments.

Vojvodina adopted a system of mixed proportional representation after the 2000 provincial election. Varga appeared on the SVM's electoral list in the 2004 provincial election and on the list of the Hungarian Coalition in the 2008 provincial election. He did not take a mandate on either occasion.

=== Municipal politics ===
Varga was elected to the Bečej municipal assembly in the December 1992 Serbian local elections and re-elected in the 1996 local elections and the 2000 local elections. After the DOS's victory in the latter campaign, he was appointed as the municipality's deputy mayor. He served in this role for the next four years.

He ran for mayor of Bečej in the 2004 Serbian local elections as the candidate of the SVM and the Christian Democratic European Movement, and was defeated in the second round of voting. He also appeared on the SVM's coalition list in the concurrent municipal assembly election (local elections having also shifted to proportional representation after 2000), though he did not take a mandate afterwards. He served on the municipal council (i.e., the executive branch of the municipal government) from 5 May to 1 December 2005.

In November 2020, he was appointed to Bečej's headquarters for emergency situations.

=== At the republic level ===
Varga was a candidate for the National Assembly of Serbia on five occasions. He appeared on the DZVM's electoral list for the Zrenjanin division in the 1992 and 1993 parliamentary elections and on the SVM's list for the smaller, redistributed division in the 1997 election. From 1992 to 2000, one-third of parliamentary mandates were awarded to candidates on successful lists in numerical order, and the remaining two-thirds were assigned to candidates at the discretion of the sponsoring parties or coalitions. Varga was not listed high enough on any of these occasions to receive an automatic mandate, nor was he given an optional mandate afterwards.

Serbia's electoral system was reformed in 2000, such that the entire country was counted as a single electoral division and all mandates were distributed to candidates on successful lists at the discretion of the sponsoring parties and coalitions, irrespective of numerical order. The SVM contested the 2003 Serbian parliamentary election as part of the Together for Tolerance coalition, and Varga appeared on the coalition's list in the thirty-fifth position. The list did not cross the electoral threshold to win representation in the assembly.

Following the 2003 election, Serbia's electoral laws were further reformed such that the electoral threshold was waived for lists representing national minority communities. The SVM fielded its own list in the 2007 Serbian parliamentary election, and Varga appeared in the eighty-first position. The list won three mandates, and he was not included afterward in the party's assembly delegation.

== Electoral record ==
=== Provincial (Assembly of Vojvodina) ===
2000 Vojvodina assembly election Bečej I (constituency seat)
Candidate	Party or Coalition	Result
József F. Varga (incumbent)	Democratic Opposition of Serbia (Affiliation: Alliance of Vojvodina Hungarians)	elected
Aleksandar Pavlović	Serbian Radical Party	
other candidates		

1996 Vojvodina assembly election Bečej I (constituency seat)
Candidate	Party or Coalition	Result
József F. Varga (incumbent)	Alliance of Vojvodina Hungarians	elected
other candidates		

December 1992 Vojvodina assembly election Bečej I (constituency seat)
Candidate	Party or Coalition	Result
József F. Varga (incumbent)	Democratic Fellowship of Vojvodina Hungarians	elected
József Kozma	Socialist Party of Serbia	
Veljko Matanović	Citizens' Group	
Zoltan Smieško	Citizens' Group: Alliance for the Citizens of the Municipality of Bečej	

May 1992 Vojvodina assembly election Bečej I (constituency seat)
Candidate	Party or Coalition	Result
József F. Varga	Democratic Fellowship of Vojvodina Hungarians	elected
József Kozma	Socialist Party of Serbia	

=== Municipal (Bečej) ===
2004 Bečej municipal election Mayor of Bečej - First and Second Round Results
Candidate	Party or Coalition	Votes	%	Votes	%
Đorđe Predin Badža	People's Democratic Party	1,879	14.26	7,215	53.31
József F. Varga	Coalition: Alliance of Vojvodina Hungarians and Christian Democratic European Movement	3,068	23.29	6,319	46.69
Dragan Živkov Džaja	Serbian Radical Party	1,828	13.87		
Zoran Subotički	G17 Plus	1,821	13.82		
Sándor Páll	Democratic Fellowship of Vojvodina Hungarians	1,500	11.39		
Živan Gavrilović	Socialist Party of Serbia	1,239	9.40		
Zoran Stojšin (incumbent)	Democratic Party	937	7.12		
Šandor Reperger	Strength of Serbia Movement	583	4.43		
Đorđe Tot	Citizens' Group	320	2.43		
Total valid votes		13,175	100	13,534	100

2000 Bečej municipal election Bečej Municipal Assembly – Bačko Petrovo Selo II (first-past-the-post)
Candidate	Party or Coalition	Votes	%
József F. Varga (incumbent)	Democratic Opposition of Serbia–Dr. Vojislav Koštunica (Affiliation: Alliance of Vojvodina Hungarians)	374	51.66
Gabor Hajnal	Christian Democratic Movement of Vojvodina Hungarians	205	28.31
Erika Horvat Arežina	Citizens' Group	99	13.67
Ivan Morošev	Serbian Radical Party	31	4.28
Robert Pece	Socialist Party of Serbia–Yugoslav Left–Slobodan Milošević	15	2.07
Total valid votes		724	100

1996 Bečej municipal election Bečej Municipal Assembly – Bačko Petrovo Selo (division unspecified)
Candidate	Party or Coalition	Result
József F. Varga (incumbent)	Alliance of Vojvodina Hungarians	elected in the second round
other candidates		

December 1992 Bečej municipal election Bečej Municipal Assembly – Seat 34: Bačko Petrovo Selo
Candidate	Party or Coalition	Result
József F. Varga	Democratic Fellowship of Vojvodina Hungarians	elected
Ištvan Žolnai	Citizens' Group	
