= Matija Kovač =

Serbian politician (born 1980)

Matija Kovač (Serbian Cyrillic: Матија Ковач; born 8 April 1980) is a politician in Serbia. He was the deputy mayor of Novi Bečej from 2013 to 2016 and is currently serving his third term in the Assembly of Vojvodina. At one time a member of the Democratic Party (Demokratska stranka, DS), he is now a member of the Serbian Progressive Party (Srpska napredna stranka, SNS).

== Private career ==
Kovač was born in Zrenjanin, Vojvodina, in what was then the Socialist Republic of Serbia in the Socialist Federal Republic of Yugoslavia. He was raised in Bečej and Novi Bečej and graduated from the University of Novi Sad Faculty of Technology with a focus in synthetic polymers. He has been the director of Poljoprivredne stručne službe Zrenjanin.

== Politician ==
=== Democratic Party ===
Kovać entered political life in the DS, appearing in the first position on the party's list for the Novi Bečej municipal assembly in the 2004 Serbian local elections. The list won four seats; he was selected for a mandate and served as chair of the municipal committee for urbanism and communal and housing activities. (From 2000 to 2011, mandates in Serbian elections held under proportional representation were given to successful parties and coalitions rather than individual candidates, and it was common practice for the mandates to be assigned out of numerical order. Kovač did not automatically receive a mandate by virtue of leading his party's list.)

Kovač also received the thirty-seventh position on the DS's list in the 2004 Vojvodina provincial election, which was held concurrently with the local elections. In this period, half of the mandates in Vojvodina provincial elections were determined by proportional representation and the other half by election in single-member constituency seats. The DS list won fifteen proportional mandates; Kovač was not initially selected for his party's delegation but received a mandate on 12 December 2006 as the replacement for another party member. The DS was the dominant party in Vojvodina's coalition government in this period, and Kovač from 2006 to 2008 served as a supporter of the administration.

Kovač was also included on the DS's list in the 2007 Serbian parliamentary election, in the one hundredth position. The list won sixty-four seats, and he was not selected for a mandate.

The DS contested the 2008 Serbian local elections in Novi Bečej as the leading party in the For a European Serbia coalition. Kovač received the second position on the coalition's list and was chosen for another mandate when the list won seven seats. On 30 May 2008, he was chosen as president (i.e., speaker) of the assembly. Kovač also sought re-election to the provincial assembly for Novi Bečej's constituency seat in the 2008 provincial election and was defeated, finishing third.

Kovač was replaced as president of the local assembly on 25 November 2009, against the backdrop of tensions between the DS and its local coalition partner, the Liberal Democratic Party (Liberalno demokratska partija, LDP). He resigned his mandate in the assembly shortly thereafter, on 3 December 2009. At some time between 2009 and 2012, he left the DS and joined the Progressive Party.

=== Serbian Progressive Party ===
Serbia's electoral laws were reformed in 2011, such that mandates were awarded in numerical order to candidates on successful lists. Kovač received the fourth position on the Progressive list for Novi Bečej in the 2012 local elections and was returned to the local assembly when the list won eight mandates. He also appeared in the twenty-second position on the Progressive-led Let's Get Vojvodina Moving list in the 2012 provincial election and was not elected when the list won only fourteen proportional mandates.

The LDP and the Progressives formed a new coalition government in Novi Bečej on 31 May 2013, Kovač was chosen as deputy mayor. He served in this role for the next three years.

Kovač received the second position on the Progressive list in the 2016 local elections and was re-elected when the list won a plurality victory with fourteen out of thirty-one mandates. He resigned his local mandate on 25 May, as he had also been elected to the provincial assembly. (Although he would have been permitted to serve in both assemblies under a dual mandate, he chose on this occasion to resign at the local level.)

Vojvodina adopted a system of full proportional representation at the provincial level prior to the 2016 provincial election. Kovač was given the fifty-third position on the Progressive Party's list in this election and won a second term in the provincial assembly when the list won a majority victory with sixty-three out of 120 mandates. He received the same position on the Progressive-led Aleksandar Vučić — For Our Children list in the 2020 provincial election and was again elected when the list won an increased majority with seventy-six seats. Kovač is now the deputy chair of the assembly committee on European integration and inter-regional co-operation and a member of the committee on youth and sports. He is also a substitute member of Serbia's delegation to the Chamber of Regions in the Council of Europe's Congress of Local and Regional Authorities. In the latter capacity, he is a member of the congress's governance committee and caucuses with the European People's Party.

Kovač has also continued to be involved in politics at the level local. He received the second position on the Progressive list for Novi Bečej in the 2020 local elections and was again elected when the list won a majority victory with twenty-one seats. On this occasion, he chose to serve in both the local and the provincial assemblies.

== Electoral record ==
=== Provincial (Vojvodina) ===
2008 Vojvodina assembly election Novi Bečej (constituency seat) - First and Second Rounds
Milivoj Vrebalov	Liberal Democratic Party	4,022	31.62	5,002	68.85
Ljubomir Filipov	Serbian Radical Party	2,407	18.92	2,263	31.15
Matija Kovač (list incumbent)	For a European Vojvodina: Democratic Party–G17 Plus, Boris Tadić (Affiliation: Democratic Party)	1,736	13.65		
Tibor Balo	Coalition: Together for Vojvodina - Nenad Čanak	1,336	10.50		
Nandor Dvorski	Hungarian Coalition–István Pásztor	909	7.15		
Branimir Lisičin	Socialist Party of Serbia–Party of United Pensioners of Serbia	846	6.65		
Zoran Trifunac	Vojvodina's Party	776	6.10		
Borislav Santrač	Democratic Party of Serbia–New Serbia	689	5.42		
Total valid votes		12,721	100	7,265	100
Invalid ballots		455		128	
Total votes casts		13,176	63.60	7,393	35.69
