= Gordana Zorić =

Serbian politician

Gordana Zorić (Serbian Cyrillic: Гордана Зорић; born 1954) is a medical doctor and politician in Serbia. She was the mayor of Kovin from 2013 to 2014 and has served in the Assembly of Vojvodina and the National Assembly of Serbia. At one time a member of the Strength of Serbia Movement (Pokret Snaga Srbije, PSS), she later joined the Serbian Progressive Party (Srpska napredna stranka, SNS).

== Early life and private career ==
Zorić was born in Kovin, Autonomous Province of Vojvodina, in what was then the People's Republic of Serbia in the Federal People's Republic of Yugoslavia. She graduated from the University of Belgrade Faculty of Medicine and worked at the Kovin Health Center for more than thirty years. She has also served on Kovin's development council, and from 2005 to 2010 she was a member of the management board of the municipality's Special Hospital for Psychiatric Diseases.

== Politician ==
=== Strength of Serbia Movement ===
Zorić entered political life as a member of the PSS. She was elected to the Vojvodina assembly in the 2004 Vojvodina provincial election, winning the Kovin constituency seat in the second round. She was also elected to the Kovin municipal assembly on the PSS's electoral list in the concurrent 2004 local elections when the party won six seats in the municipality. In the provincial assembly, she was a member of the committee for health and social policy and the committee for demographic policy and social care, as well as a sub-committee on Vojvodina's spas.

Zorić was re-elected to the Kovin municipal assembly in special new elections held on 4 June 2006 when the PSS list won four seats. She also ran for mayor of Kovin in a by-election held later in the month and was defeated. (From 2002 to 2007, Serbian mayors were directly elected; before and after this time, they were chosen by elected local assembly members.) She later appeared in the seventh position on the PSS's list in the 2007 Serbian parliamentary election; the list did not cross the electoral threshold to win representation in the assembly.

She did not seek re-election to the provincial assembly in 2008, and online information does not indicate if she was a candidate in that year's local elections. She later left the PSS.

=== Serbian Progressive Party ===
Zorić appeared on the SNS's electoral list in the 2009 local elections and received a mandate when the list won nine seats. The Democratic Party (Demokratska stranka, DS) and its allies won the election, and the Progressives served in opposition. She received the lead position on the SNS's list in the 2013 local elections and was re-elected when the list won a majority victory with twenty-four out of forty-five seats. When the new assembly convened, she was chosen as mayor.

Zorić was given the eighty-first position on the SNS's list in the 2014 Serbian parliamentary election and was elected when the list won a majority victory with 158 out of 250 seats. As she could not hold a dual mandate, she resigned as mayor in June 2014. In the national assembly, she served on the committee for environmental protection; was a deputy member of the health and family committee and the committee on labour, social affairs, social inclusion, and poverty reduction; and a member of the parliamentary friendship groups with Austria, Bosnia and Herzegovina, Canada, Croatia, the Czech Republic, Finland, France, Germany, Greece, Hungary, Italy, Luxembourg, the Republic of Macedonia, Montenegro, the Netherlands, Norway, Poland, Romania, Russia, Slovakia, Slovenia, Spain, Sweden, Switzerland, Tunisia, Turkey, the United Kingdom, and the United States of America. She was not a candidate for re-election in 2016 and has not returned to political life since this time.

== Electoral record ==
=== Local (Kovin) ===
2006 Municipality of Kovin local by-election: Mayor of Kovin
Candidate	Party	First round		Second round	
Candidate	Party	Votes	%	Votes	%
Sava Krstić	Democratic Party of Serbia, Dr. Vojislav Koštunica–New Serbia, Mr. Velimir Ilić	2,342		5,326	51.98
Stevan Kolarević	Citizens' Group: Democratic Blok (Democratic Party, G17 Plus, League of Social Democrats of Vojvodina, Serbian Renewal Movement, Civic Alliance of Serbia, Alliance of Vojvodina Hungarians, Democratic Vojvodina, Vojvodina's Party, Reformists of Vojvodina)	2,672		4,921	48.02
Blagoje Bogdanović	The Socialists (SPS and SNS)				
Dragan Mićović	Citizens' Group: For Justice and Equality				
Tatjana Radenković Jakšić	Serbian Radical Party				
Jezdimir Ranković	Citizens' Group: Reformists				
Gordana Zorić	Strength of Serbia Movement–Bogoljub Karić				
Total				10,247	100.00
Valid votes				10,247	97.84
Invalid/blank votes				226	2.16
Total votes				10,473	100.00
Registered voters/turnout		30,007	–	30,007	34.90

=== Provincial (Vojvodina) ===
2004 Vojvodina provincial election: Kovin
Candidate	Party	First round		Second round	
Candidate	Party	Votes	%	Votes	%
Dr. Gordana Zorić	Strength of Serbia Movement–Bogoljub Karić	1,566	18.37	4,266	61.15
Srboljub Marinković	Serbian Radical Party	1,375	16.13	2,710	38.85
Dušan Milić	Democratic Party–Boris Tadić	1,298	15.23		
Sveto Vukadinović	Coalition: United Socialists (SPS–SNS)	1,281	15.03		
Velinka Fara Vukica	Citizens' Group: Active Women, Kovin	803	9.42		
Stevan Kolarević (incumbent)	Democratic Party of Serbia	583	6.84		
Slavko Panić	Together for Vojvodina–Nenad Čanak	572	6.71		
Dr. Divna Kerničan Mirjanić	Vojvodina Coalition	428	5.02		
Srđan Stojanović	G17 Plus	317	3.72		
Rade Klarić	New Serbia	300	3.52		
Total		8,523	100.00	6,976	100.00
Valid votes		8,523	93.20	6,976	93.60
Invalid/blank votes		622	6.80	477	6.40
Total votes		9,145	100.00	7,453	100.00
