= Slobodan Škorić =

Serbian politician

- Born: 3 February 1954 (age 72)
- Occupation: politician
- Years active: 1997–2000
- Known for: member, Assembly of Vojvodina
- Political party: Socialist Party of Serbia

Slobodan Škorić (Serbian Cyrillic: Слободан Шкорић; born 3 February 1954) is a politician in Serbia. He served in the Assembly of Vojvodina from 1997 to 2000 as a member of the Socialist Party of Serbia.

== Private career ==
Škorić is a graduated political scientist.

== Politician ==
Škorić was elected to the Vojvodina assembly in the 1996 provincial election for Bačka Palanka's first constituency. The Socialist Party won a majority victory. When the assembly convened on 9 January 1997, Škorić was chosen as one of its three deputy speakers. He was not re-elected in the 2000 provincial election.

He was the Socialist Party's candidate for mayor of Bačka Palanka in the 2004 Serbian local elections and was defeated by Dragan Bozalo of the Serbian Radical Party in the second round. He was later included on the Socialist Party's electoral list in the 2007 Serbian parliamentary election, in the 245th position out of 250. The list won sixteen mandates, and he was not included in the party's assembly delegation. (From 2000 to 2011, mandates in Serbian parliamentary elections were awarded to sponsoring parties or coalitions rather than individual candidates, and it was common practice for the mandates to be assigned out of numerical order. Škorić could have been awarded a mandate despite his low position on the list, which was in any event mostly alphabetical.)

Škorić appeared in the lead position on the Socialist Party's list for Bačka Palanka in the 2008 Serbian local elections. The list won five mandates, though he did not subsequently take a seat in the local assembly. This notwithstanding, he represented the party in negotiations around forming the city's coalition government. He initially led the Socialists into an alliance led by the Serbian Radical Party, and in November 2018 he helped to form a new government led by the Democratic Party. (The Radicals returned to office in a coalition without the Socialists in 2010.)

In November 2010, Škorić helped to bring several local members of the Strength of Serbia Movement into the Socialist Party.

He remains a member of the Socialist Party's executive board in Bačka Palanka as of 2021.

== Electoral record ==
=== Municipal (Bačka Palanka) ===
2004 Bačka Palanka municipal election Mayor of Bačka Palanka
Dragan Bozalo	Serbian Radical Party	4,952	27.94	6,233	51.16
Slobodan Škorić	Socialist Party of Serbia	2,717	15.33	5,951	48.84
Jovan Palalić	Democratic Party of Serbia	2,645	14.92		
Kosta Stakić	Democratic Party	2,503	14.12		
Milutin Rujević	Strength of Serbia Movement	1,733	9.78		
Goran Milošev	New Serbia	951	5.37		
Slobodan Stojnović	Serbian Renewal Movement	911	5.14		
Bogoljub Trkulja	Citizens' Group	740	4.17		
Tatjana Drobac	Christian Democratic Party of Serbia	573	3.23		
Total valid votes		17,725	100	12,184	100
