= Radivoje Milanović =

Serbian politician and administrator (born 1965)

Radivoje Milanović (Serbian Cyrillic: Радивоје Милановић; born 22 November 1965) is a former politician and administrator in Serbia. He served in the National Assembly of Serbia from 2007 to 2008 and was a secretary of state in the Serbian government from 2008 to 2010. During his political career, he was a member of the Democratic Party (Demokratska stranka, DS).

== Private career ==
Milanović was general director of the public enterprise for underground coal mining in the early 2000s. In 2007, he was listed as having a master's degree in mining and living in Despotovac.

== Politician ==
Milanović ran for mayor of Despotovac in the 2006 Serbian local elections, with a combined endorsement from the DS and the Liberals of Serbia (Liberali Srbije, LS). He was defeated in the second round of voting.

He appeared in the 135th position on the DS's electoral list in the 2007 Serbian parliamentary election. The list won sixty-four mandates, and he was included afterward in the party's assembly delegation. (From 2000 to 2011, mandates in Serbian parliamentary elections were awarded to sponsoring parties or coalitions rather than individual candidates, and it was common practice for the mandates to be distributed out of numerical order. Milanović's position on the list – which was in any event mostly alphabetical – had no specific bearing on his chances of election.) After the election, the DS formed an unstable coalition government with the rival Democratic Party of Serbia (Demokratska stranka Srbije, DSS) and G17 Plus, and Milanović served as a government supporter. He was a member of the committee for privatization and the committee for industry.

The DS–DSS alliance collapsed in early 2008, and a new parliamentary election was held in May of that year. The DS contested the election at the head of the For a European Serbia (Za evropsku Srbiju, ZES) alliance. Milanović was included on the coalition's list and was awarded a mandate for a second term when the list won a plurality victory with 102 out of 250 mandates. The overall results of the election were inconclusive, but the ZES alliance eventually formed a coalition government with the Socialist Party of Serbia (Socijalistička partija Srbije, SPS), and Milanović again served as a government supporter. He held the same committee assignments as in the previous term.

He left the assembly on 6 October 2008 and served for a time as a secretary of state in Serbia's ministry of mining and energy. In this role, he took part in discussions with Rio Tinto on opening a lithium mine and in negotiations with miners on health insurance payments. In July 2009, he said that the Kolubara coal basin would need to increase production by thirteen millions tons per year to facilitate the operation of two new thermal power plants.

In 2010, Milanović became an engineer with Elektroprivreda Srbije.

== Electoral record ==
=== Municipal (Despotovac) ===
2006 Municipality of Despotovac local by-election: Mayor of Despotovac
Candidate	Party	First round		Second round	
Candidate	Party	Votes	%	Votes	%
Gradimir Malešević	Democratic Party of Serbia–New Serbia–United Serbia	5,576	42.62	5,525	52.48
Radivoje Milanović	Democratic Party–Liberals of Serbia	4,050	30.96	5,003	47.52
Slobodan Stojanović	Serbian Radical Party				
Momir Anđelković	Socialist Party of Serbia				
Total				10,528	100.00
