= Dragan Živkov =

Serbian politician

- Драган Живков

National Assembly of Serbia
- In office 2004–2012

Personal details
- Born: 3 November 1958 (age 67)
- Party: Serbian Radical Party

Dragan Živkov (Serbian Cyrillic: Драган Живков; born 3 November 1958) is a former politician in Serbia. He served in the National Assembly of Serbia from 2004 to 2012 as a member of the far-right Serbian Radical Party.

== Private career ==
Živkov is a private entrepreneur from Bečej in the province of Vojvodina. In 2005, he indicated that he ran a family-owned company dealing with services and transport in civil engineering. He is also the president of FK Vojvodina Bačko Gradište.

== Politician ==
Živkov first sought election to the national assembly in the 1997 Serbian parliamentary election, appearing in the seventh position on the Radical Party's electoral list for the Zrenjanin division. The list won four seats, and he did not receive a mandate. (From 1992 to 2000, one-third of Serbian parliamentary mandates were awarded to candidates on successful lists in numerical order, while the other two-thirds were distributed among other candidates at the discretion of the sponsoring parties or coalitions. Živkov could have received a mandate when the assembly convened despite his relatively low list position, although in the event he did not.)

He later appeared in the second position on the Radical Party's list for the Vrbas division in the 2000 election for the Chamber of Citizens in the Federal Assembly of Yugoslavia. The list did not win any mandates. He was, however, elected to the Bečej municipal assembly in the concurrent 2000 Serbian local elections, winning in the second division in Bačko Gradište. This was the last local electoral cycle in Serbia wherein members were elected in single-member constituencies; all subsequent local electoral cycles have been held under proportional representation.

Serbia's electoral system was reformed at the republic level in 2000, such that the entire country became a single electoral division and all mandates were awarded to candidates on successful lists at the discretion of the sponsoring parties or coalitions, irrespective of numerical order. Živkov appeared in the sixty-first position on the Radical Party's list in the 2003 Serbian parliamentary election. The list won eighty-two mandates, and he was included in the party's delegation when the assembly met in January 2004. Although the Radicals won more seats than any other party in 2003, they fell well short of a majority and served in opposition in the parliament that followed. Živkov was a member of the committee on inter-ethnic relations and the committee on economic reforms.

Žikvov was the Radical Party's candidate for mayor of Bečej in the 2004 Serbian local elections and finished third. He also led the party's list in the concurrent municipal assembly election and was re-elected when the list won seven mandates. The Radicals initially participated in a local coalition government after the election, and Žikvov was a member of the municipal council (i.e., the executive branch of the local government) from 14 October 2004 until 16 April 2005, when the party was excluded from the administration. Bečej's sitting mayor lost a recall election in late 2005, and Živkov ran in the 2006 by-election to fill the position. He was defeated in the second round of voting. Serbia subsequently abandoned the direct election of mayors.

Živkov appeared on the Radical Party's lists in the 2007 and 2008 parliamentary elections and was included in the party's assembly delegation both times. He was also re-elected to the Bečej assembly in the 2008 local elections, after leading a combined list of the Radicals, the Democratic Party of Serbia, and New Serbia. The Radical Party continued to serve in opposition in this time, at both the republic level and the municipal level in Bečej. The party also experienced a serious split in late 2008, with several members joining the more moderate Serbian Progressive Party under the leadership of Tomislav Nikolić and Aleksandar Vučić. Živkov remained with the Radicals.

Serbia's electoral system was reformed yet again in 2011, such that mandates were awarded in numerical order to candidates on successful lists. Živkov appeared in the sixty-fifth position on the Radical Party's list in the 2012 parliamentary election and led the party's list in Bečej in the concurrent 2012 local elections. Both lists failed to cross their respective electoral thresholds.

Živkov also sought election to the Assembly of Vojvodina on two occasions, running for the Bečej constituency seat in the 2004 and 2012 provincial elections. He was defeated both times. He has not sought a return to political life since 2012.

== Electoral record ==
=== Provincial (Vojvodina) ===
2012 Vojvodina assembly election Bečej (constituency seat) - First and Second Rounds
Candidate	Party or Coalition	Votes	%	Votes	%
Slobodan Zlokolica	Choice for a Better Vojvodina–Bojan Pajtić	3,382	18.67	10,410	64.68
Vuk Radojević	Let's Get Vojvodina Moving–Tomislav Nikolić (Serbian Progressive Party, New Serbia, Movement of Socialists, Strength of Serbia Movement) (Affiliation: Serbia Progressive Party)	2,881	15.91	5,685	35.32
Laslo Feher	Alliance of Vojvodina Hungarians	2,634	14.54		
Zoltan Guljaš	"Miša Vrebalov–U-Turn"	1,981	10.94		
Milica Gobelić	Democratic Party of Serbia	1,484	8.19		
Jelena Češljević	Socialist Party of Serbia (SPS)–Party of United Pensioners of Serbia (PUPS)–United Serbia (JS)–Social Democratic Party of Serbia (SDP Srbije)	1,167	6.44		
Dragan Živkov	Serbian Radical Party	972	5.37		
Vera Guljaš	League of Social Democrats of Vojvodina–Nenad Čanak	797	4.40		
Igor Kiš	Democratic Party of Vojvodina Hungarians	787	4.35		
István Tari	Democratic Fellowship of Vojvodina Hungarians–VMDK	707	3.90		
Zubcsik Gábor	Hungarian Hope Movement	477	2.63		
Čila Mešter-Kuti	Hungarian Civic Alliance	476	2.63		
Magdolna Šlajf	United Regions of Serbia–Mlađan Dinkić	366	2.02		
Total valid votes		18,111	100	16,095	100

2004 Vojvodina assembly election Bečej (constituency seat) - First and Second Rounds
Candidate	Party or Coalition	Votes	%	Votes	%
Tibor Jakab	Coalition: Alliance of Vojvodina Hungarians and Christian Democratic European Movement	2,638	20.35	7,022	52.83
Dragan Živkov Džaja	Serbian Radical Party	2,395	18.48	6,270	47.17
Đorđe Predin Badža	People's Democratic Party	2,377	18.34		
Endre Sabo	G17 Plus	1,371	10.58		
Šandor Reperger	Strength of Serbia Movement	1,214	9.37		
Zora Alić	Socialist Party of Serbia	1,131	8.73		
Peter Roža	Democratic Party of Vojvodina Hungarians	1,026	7.92		
Ištvan Tari	Democratic Fellowship of Vojvodina Hungarians	809	6.24		
Total valid votes		12,961	100	13,292	100
Invalid ballots		533		478	
Total votes casts		13,494	39.15	13,770	39.95

=== Municipal (Bečej) ===
2006 Bečej municipal by-election Mayor of Bečej - First and Second Round Results
Candidate	Party or Coalition	Votes	%	Votes	%
Dušan Jovanović	Democratic Party of Serbia	2,571	17.05	9,147	65.45
Dragan Živkov Džaja	Serbian Radical Party	2,658	17.63	4,829	34.55
Peter Knezi	Alliance of Vojvodina Hungarians	2,417	16.03		
Živan Gavrilović	Socialist Party of Serbia	1,743	11.56		
Zoran Subotički	G17 Plus	1,741	11.55		
Gordana Kovačev	Democratic Party–Boris Tadić	1,544	10.24		
Šandor Reperger	Strength of Serbia Movement–Bogoljub Karić	908	6.02		
Slobodan Borojević Bata	Citizens' Group	629	4.17		
Sándor Páll	Democratic Fellowship of Vojvodina Hungarians	584	3.87		
Laslo Friš	Democratic Party of Vojvodina Hungarians	282	1.87		
Total valid votes		15,077	100	13,976	100

2004 Bečej municipal election Mayor of Bečej - First and Second Round Results
Candidate	Party or Coalition	Votes	%	Votes	%
Đorđe Predin Badža	People's Democratic Party	1,879	14.26	7,215	53.31
József F. Varga	Coalition: Alliance of Vojvodina Hungarians and Christian Democratic European Movement	3,068	23.29	6,319	46.69
Dragan Živkov Džaja	Serbian Radical Party	1,828	13.87		
Zoran Subotički	G17 Plus	1,821	13.82		
Sándor Páll	Democratic Fellowship of Vojvodina Hungarians	1,500	11.39		
Živan Gavrilović	Socialist Party of Serbia	1,239	9.40		
Zoran Stojšin (incumbent)	Democratic Party	937	7.12		
Šandor Reperger	Strength of Serbia Movement	583	4.43		
Đorđe Tot	Citizens' Group	320	2.43		
Total valid votes		13,175	100	13,534	100

2000 Bečej municipal election Bečej Municipal Assembly – Bačko Gradište II (First-past-the-post)
Candidate	Party or Coalition	Votes	%
Dragan Živkov Džaja	Serbian Radical Party	125	24.95
Miodrag Despotović Mija	Socialist Party of Serbia–Yugoslav Left–Slobodan Milošević	111	22.16
Pavle Stojšić	Democratic Opposition of Serbia–Dr. Vojislav Koštunica	102	20.36
Laslo Feher	Democratic Fellowship of Vojvodina Hungarians	73	14.57
Reza Molnar	Citizens' Group	59	11.78
Ištvan Burza	Citizens' Group	31	6.19
Total valid votes		501	100
