= Saša Maksimović (politician) =

Serbian politician

Saša Maksimović (Serbian Cyrillic: Саша Максимовић; born 17 December 1976) is a politician in Serbia. He served in the National Assembly of Serbia from 2008 to 2016 and has been the mayor of Novi Bečej since 2016. Formerly with the Serbian Radical Party (SRS), he has been a member of the Serbian Progressive Party (SNS) since its founding in 2008.

== Early life and career ==
Maksimović was born in Zrenjanin, Vojvodina, in what was then the Socialist Republic of Serbia in the Socialist Federal Republic of Yugoslavia. He was raised in Novi Bečej and trained as a food technology engineer.

== Politician ==
=== Serbian Radical Party ===
Maksimović ran for the Novi Bečej municipal assembly in the 2000 Serbian local elections as the Radical Party's candidate in the fourth division. Online sources do not indicate if he was elected. The SRS won only one seat in the municipality in this cycle.

Serbia switched to a system of proportional representation for local elections after 2000, and for the 2004 election cycle the country introduced the direct election of mayors. Maksimović appeared in the third position on the Radical Party's electoral list for Novi Bečej in the 2004 local elections and was elected when the list won eight mandates. Novi Bečej's sitting mayor was defeated in a recall election in 2006, and Maksimović was the Radical Party's candidate in the mayoral by-election that followed. He received the most votes in the first round but was narrowly defeated in the run-off by Milivoj Vrebalov of the Liberal Democratic Party (LDP). The direct election of mayors proved to be a short-lived experiment and was abandoned in 2008.

Maksimović received the 127th position on the Radical Party's list in the 2008 Serbian parliamentary election and was awarded a mandate in the national assembly after the list won seventy-eight seats. (From 2000 to 2011, Serbian parliamentary mandates were awarded to sponsoring parties or coalitions rather than to individual candidates, and it was common practice for the mandates to be assigned out of numerical order. Maksimović's list position had no formal bearing on his chances of election.) While the election results were inconclusive, the For a European Serbia (ZES) alliance eventually formed a coalition government with the Socialist Party of Serbia (SPS), and the Radicals served in opposition.

He also appeared in the first position on the SRS's list for Novi Bečej in the 2008 local elections, which were held concurrently with the parliamentary vote, and received a new mandate after the list won nine seats. He resigned from the local assembly on 24 July 2008.

=== Serbian Progressive Party ===
The Radical Party experienced a serious split in late 2008, with several members joining the more moderate Serbian Progressive Party under the leadership of Tomislav Nikolić and Aleksandar Vučić. Maksimović sided with the Progressives.

Serbia's electoral system was reformed in 2011, such that all mandates were awarded in numerical order to candidates on successful lists. Maksimović received the sixty-second position on the Progressive Party's Let's Get Serbia Moving list in the 2012 parliamentary election and was re-elected when the list won seventy-three mandates. The SNS formed a new government with the SPS after the election, and Maksimović served as a government supporter. He also appeared in the lead position on the SNS's list in Novi Bečej for the concurrent the 2012 Serbian local elections and was re-elected when the list won eight mandates, narrowly losing to a coalition list led by the LDP. On this occasion, he served in both the republican and local parliaments. The Progressives joined the local government of Novi Bečej in May 2013, and Maksimović became president (i.e., speaker) of the assembly, serving in this role until October 2014.

He was given the 133rd position on the SNS's list in the 2014 Serbian parliamentary election and was elected to a third term when the list won a majority victory with 158 mandates. He did not seek re-election at the republic level in 2016.

Maksimović again led the SNS's list in Novi Bečej for the 2016 Serbian local elections and, on this occasion, led the party to a plurality victory with fourteen out of thirty-one seats. The SNS formed a coalition government after the vote, and Maksimović was chosen as mayor. He led the list to a majority victory in the 2020 local elections and was confirmed afterward for another term in office.

In September 2021, he signed a deal with the neighbouring municipality of Kikinda for shared services in the field of animal hygiene.

== Electoral record ==
=== Municipal (Novi Bečej) ===
2006 Novi Bečej municipal by-election Mayor of Novi Bečej - First and Second Round Results
Candidate	Party or Coalition	Votes	%	Votes	%
Milivoj Vrebalov Miša	Liberal Democratic Party	1,696	20.76	4,136	50.89
Saša Maksimović	Serbian Radical Party	2,013	24.64	3,992	49.11
Radoslav Čokić	Democratic Party of Serbia	1,203	14.72		
Aca T. Ðukičin	Democratic Party	1,021	12.50		
Zoran Trifunac	Citizens' Group: Zoran Trifunac and Citizens	793	9.71		
Branimir Lisičin	Socialist Party of Serbia	598	7.32		
Petar Kerkez	Citizens' Group: Da Pobedimo Prošlost	558	6.83		
Momir Mandić Moma	Party of United Pensioners of Serbia	288	3.53		
Total valid votes		8,170	100	8,128	100
