= Vladimir Todorović =

Serbian orthopaedist and politician (1949–2022)

Vladimir Todorović (Serbian Cyrillic: Владимир Тодоровић; 1949–19 January 2022) was a Serbian medical doctor and politician. He served in the Assembly of the Federal Republic of Yugoslavia from 1992 to 1996 as a member of the Socialist Party of Serbia (Socijalistička partija Srbije, SPS).

== Private career ==
Todorović was an orthopedist. He worked for several years at the Sveti Luka General Hospital in Smederevo, serving at different times as its director, assistant director for strategic planning and health management, and chief coordinator of the accreditation process.

== Politician ==
The Federal Republic of Yugoslavia (FRY) was established in April 1992, following the breakup of the Socialist Federal Republic of Yugoslavia (SFRY). The first elections for the lower house of the FRY's parliament, known as the Chamber of Citizens, were held in May of the same year; half of its members were elected via first-past-the-post voting in single-member constituencies, while the other half were elected via proportional representation. Todorović was elected for the Smederevo division. During this period, Serbian and Yugoslavian politics were dominated by the SPS and its authoritarian leader, Slobodan Milošević.

The May 1992 Yugoslavian election was widely seen as lacking legitimacy due to a boycott from most opposition parties, and a new federal election was called for December 1992. The electoral system was reformed prior to the vote, such that all mandates were determined by proportional representation. Todorović appeared in the third position on the SPS's electoral list for the vastly enlarged Smederevo division and was returned to the assembly when the list won five mandates.

Todorović appears to have stood down from parliament at the time of the 1996 Yugoslavian assembly election and was later appointed as general manager of the Sveti Luka hospital. He was forced out of this role with the fall of Milošević's government in October 2000, after an awkward confrontation with several of his colleagues. A news report from the period indicates that Todovorić was regarded by supporters of the political opposition as a decent person on an individual level, though largely ineffective as a manager. He continued working at the hospital afterward.

He later left the SPS and ran for mayor of Smederevo in a 2006 by-election as the candidate of an independent group called the "Movement for Smederevo." He was defeated in the first round of voting. In the second round, he endorsed the winning candidate, Saša Radosavljević of the Democratic Party of Serbia (Demokratska stranka Srbije, DSS).

== Death ==
Todorović died on 19 January 2022.

== Electoral record ==
=== Local (Smederevo) ===
2006 Municipality of Smederevo local by-election: Mayor of Smederevo
Candidate	Party	First round		Second round	
Candidate	Party	Votes	%	Votes	%
Saša Radosavljević	Democratic Party of Serbia	6,102		16,428	53.38
Predrag Umičević	Democratic Party	7,577		14,349	46.62
Dragan Čolić	Serbian Radical Party	5,825			
Tomislav Petrović	Liberal Democratic Party				
Dejan Reljić	Strength of Serbia Movement				
Bogoljub Spasojević	Citizens' Group: For a Better Village, For a Better City				
Slaviša Stevanović	Citizens' Group: Coalition for a Better Smederevo				
Vladimir Todorović	Citizens' Group: Movement for Smederevo				
Dušan Trajković	G17 Plus				
Zoran Zarić	Socialist Party of Serbia				
Total				30,777	100.00

=== Federal (FR Yugoslavia) ===
May 1992 Yugoslavian federal election: Smederevo
Candidate	Party	Votes	%
Vladimir Todorović	Socialist Party of Serbia	35,139	54.28
Danilo Golubović	Serbian Radical Party	24,611	38.01
Dragomir Cvetković	Citizens' Group	2,506	3.87
Božidar Cvetković	League of Communists – Movement for Yugoslavia	2,485	3.84
Total		64,741	100.00
