= Tihomir Petković =

Serbian politician

Tihomir Petković (Serbian Cyrillic: Тихомир Петковић; born 29 March 1958) is a politician in Serbia. He served three terms as the mayor of Užice and has been a member of the National Assembly of Serbia since 2020. Formerly a prominent local figure in the Democratic Party of Serbia (Demokratska stranka Srbije, DSS), Petković has been a member of the Serbian Progressive Party (Srpska napredna stranka, SNS) since 2013.

== Private career ==
Petković graduated from the University of Belgrade Faculty of Economics in 1983. He subsequently managed the private trading company Gradina and worked for NIS Jugopetrol.

== Politician ==
=== Municipal ===
Petković appeared in the third position on the DSS's electoral list for the Užice municipal assembly in the 2004 Serbian local elections and was given a mandate after the list won seven seats. Two years later, he was elected as mayor of the municipality in a by-election. At the time, mayors in Serbia were chosen by direct election; Petković defeated a candidate from a coalition led by the rival Democratic Party (Demokratska stranka, DS) in the second round of voting and served as mayor for the next two years. Concurrently, he was also one of Serbia's delegates to the Chamber of Local Authorities in the Congress of Local and Regional Authorities in the Council of Europe.

Serbia changed its municipal election laws prior to the 2008 local elections, such that mayors were selected by local assemblies rather being directly elected. Petković led the DSS coalition list for Užice in this electoral cycle and was re-elected to the assembly when the list won seventeen mandates. The election was won by the DS and its allies, and Petković stood down as mayor. He again led the DSS list for the 2012 local elections and was re-elected when the list won seven mandates.

Petković left the DSS in 2013 and joined the Progressive Party. He was appointed to a second term as mayor of the city the following year, after the resignation of Saša Milošević. He led the Progressive list in the 2016 local elections and continued as mayor after the list won a majority victory.

On returning to the mayor's office in 2014, Petković identified the city's water supply as his primary concern; in September 2016, he announced the beginning of a major reconstruction project of the city's drinking water facility. He did not seek re-election at the local level in 2020.

=== Parliamentarian ===
Petković appeared in the seventy-first position on the DSS list in 2012 Serbian parliamentary election. The list won twenty-one mandates, and he was not returned.

He received the 142nd position on the Progressive Party's Aleksandar Vučić — For Our Children list in the 2020 parliamentary election and was elected to the national assembly when the list won a landslide majority with 188 mandates. He is now a member of the assembly's foreign affairs committee and the committee on the economy, regional development, trade, tourism, and energy, and a member of Serbia's parliamentary friendship groups with Austria, Belarus, Italy, Japan, Kazakhstan, and Russia.

== Electoral record ==
=== Local (Užice) ===
2006 Municipality of Užice by-election: Mayor of Užice
Candidate	Party	First round		Second round	
Candidate	Party	Votes	%	Votes	%
Tihomir Petković	Coalition: Democratic Party of Serbia–G17 Plus–New Serbia (Affiliation: Democratic Party of Serbia)	5,899	26.69	9,566	53.26
Milomir Sredojević	Coalition: Best for Užice Democratic Party–Serbian Renewal Movement–Social Democratic Party (Affiliation: Democratic Party)	4,254	19.24	8,394	46.74
Dragiša Stanojčić	Serbian Radical Party	3,864	17.48		
Milovan Petrović	Citizen's Group: For a More Beautiful and Richer Užice	3,395	15.36		
Dragoljub Kostić	Citizens' Group: League for Užice	3,117	14.10		
Jovan Mirosavljević	Liberal Democratic Party	964	4.36		
Veličko Mićović	Civic Alliance of Serbia	355	1.61		
Blagoje Radojičić	Serbian Democratic Renewal Movement	258	1.17		
Total		22,106	100.00	17,960	100.00
Valid votes		22,106	99.00	18,314	98.10
Invalid/blank votes		224	1.00	354	1.90
Total votes		22,330	100.00	18,668	100.00
Registered voters/turnout		69,418	32.17	69,418	26.89
Source: Apparent minor errors in both sources have been corrected.
