= Dragan Čolić =

Serbian politician

Dragan Čolić (Serbian Cyrillic: Драган Чолић; born 10 October 1953) is a retired Serbian politician. He served in the National Assembly of Serbia from 1997 to 2014, initially as a member of the far-right Serbian Radical Party (Srpska radikalna stranka, SRS) and later with the Serbian Progressive Party (Srpska napredna stranka, SNS).

== Private career ==
Čolić was born in Smederevo, in what was then the People's Republic of Serbia in the Federal People's Republic of Yugoslavia. He is a radio mechanic by training.

== Politician ==
=== Serbian Radical Party ===
==== During the Miloševic years ====
Čolić became president of the Radical Party's Podunavlje District board in the 1990s, prior to his election to the national assembly.

He received the lead position on the SRS's electoral list for the Smederevo division in the 1997 Serbian parliamentary election and was elected when the list won two mandates. (From 1992 to 2000, Serbia's electoral law stipulated that one-third of parliamentary mandates would be assigned to candidates on successful lists in numerical order, while the remaining two-thirds would be distributed amongst other candidates at the discretion of sponsoring parties or coalitions. As the list leader, Čolić was automatically elected.) The Radicals joined a coalition government with the Socialist Party of Serbia (Socijalistička partija Srbije, SPS) and the Yugoslav Left (Jugoslovenska Levica, JUL) in March 1998, and Čolić served as a supporter of the administration. In March 2000, he was also chosen as one of the Serbian assembly's delegates to the Chamber of Republics in the Yugoslavian parliament.

SPS leader Slobodan Milošević was defeated in his bid for re-election in the 2000 Yugoslavian presidential election, a watershed moment in Serbian and Yugoslavian politics. The first (and only) direct election for the Chamber of Republics took place at the same time; Čolić was not a candidate, and his term in that assembly accordingly came to an end. He ran for election to the Smederevo city assembly in the concurrent 2000 Serbian local elections and, like all Radical Party candidates in the municipality during this cycle, was defeated.

==== After the fall of Milošević ====
The Serbian government fell after Milošević's defeat in the Yugoslavian election, and a new Serbian parliamentary election was called for December 2000. Serbia's electoral laws were reformed prior to the vote, such that the entire country was counted as a single electoral division and all mandates were distributed to candidates on successful lists at the discretion of the sponsoring parties or coalitions, irrespective of numerical order. Čolić appeared in the twenty-second position on the Radical Party's list. The party won twenty-three seats, and he was afterward awarded a mandate for a second national assembly term. The Democratic Opposition of Serbia (Demokratska opozicija Srbije, DOS) won a landslide victory in this election, and the Radicals served in opposition.

Čolić received the eighteenth position on the Radical Party's list in the 2003 parliamentary election and was again included in its assembly delegation when the list won eighty-two seats. Although the Radicals were the largest party in the assembly that followed, they fell well short of a majority and continued in opposition. Čolić served on the environmental protection committee and the committee for youth and sports.

Serbia briefly introduced the direct election of mayors in the 2004 Serbian local elections. Čolić was not the SRS's mayoral candidate in Smederevo for this cycle; he was instead elected to the city assembly when the party's list won twelve out of seventy mandates. The city's elected mayor, Jasna Avramović, was defeated in a recall election in late 2005, and a by-election to choose her successor was held in early 2006. Čolić was the SRS's candidate in the by-election and was defeated, finishing third.

The SRS won eighty-one seats in the 2007 parliamentary election, again winning more seats than any other party but falling short of a majority; as before, the party served in opposition. Čolić was given the forty-sixth position on the party's list and was again chosen for a mandate. He became the chair of the committee on petitions and proposals and continued to serve on the environmental protection committee.

Čolić appeared in the sixty-second position on the SRS's list in the 2008 parliamentary election and was given a mandate for a fifth term when the list won seventy-eight seats. The results of this election were inconclusive, and the Radicals subsequently held discussions with the Democratic Party of Serbia (Demokratska stranka Srbije, DSS) and the Socialists about forming a new coalition government. This ultimately did not happen; the Socialists instead joined a coalition government led by the For a European Serbia (Za evropsku Srbiju, ZES) alliance, and the Radicals once again remained in opposition. Čolić also led the SRS's list in Smederevo in the 2008 Serbian local elections, which were held concurrently with the parliamentary vote, and took a mandate when the list won sixteen seats.

=== Serbian Progressive Party ===
The Radicals experienced a serious split in late 2008, with several members joining the more moderate Serbian Progressive Party under the leadership of Tomislav Nikolić and Aleksandar Vučić. Čolić, who was identified as an ally of Nikolić, sided with the Progressives and joined their assembly group. During the 2008–12 parliament, he served on the poverty reduction committee and the committee for relations with Serbs outside of Serbia, and was a member of the parliamentary friendship group with Slovakia.

Serbia's electoral laws were reformed again in 2011, such that all parliamentary mandates were awarded to candidates on successful lists in numerical order. Čolić received the forty-seventh position on the Progressive Party's Let's Get Serbia Moving list in the 2012 Serbian parliamentary election and was re-elected when the list won seventy-three mandates. The SNS formed a new coalition government with the SPS and other parties after the vote, and, for the first time in twelve years, Čolić served as a supporter of the administration. In his sixth assembly term, he was a member of the committee for agriculture, forestry, and water management, and a deputy member of the committee for environmental protection and the committee for justice, state administration, and local self-government.

In December 2012, Čolić hit a twelve-year-old child with his car at a pedestrian crossing and was accused of fleeing the scene. (The child was not seriously hurt.) Čolić was later found to have been extremely intoxicated at the time of the accident. The matter received significant attention in the Serbian media. Čolić claimed he was not aware he had hit the child and did not flee the scene.

He did not appear on the SNS's list in the 2014 parliamentary election, and his term in the assembly ended in that year.

== Electoral record ==
=== Local (Smederevo) ===
2006 Municipality of Smederevo local by-election: Mayor of Smederevo
Candidate	Party	First round		Second round	
Candidate	Party	Votes	%	Votes	%
Saša Radosavljević	Democratic Party of Serbia	6,102		16,428	53.38
Predrag Umičević	Democratic Party	7,577		14,349	46.62
Dragan Čolić	Serbian Radical Party	5,825			
Tomislav Petrović	Liberal Democratic Party				
Dejan Reljić	Strength of Serbia Movement				
Bogoljub Spasojević	Citizens' Group: For a Better Village, For a Better City				
Slaviša Stevanović	Citizens' Group: Coalition for a Better Smederevo				
Vladimir Todorović	Citizens' Group: Movement for Smederevo				
Dušan Trajković	G17 Plus				
Zoran Zarić	Socialist Party of Serbia				
Total				30,777	100.00
