= Zoran Subotički =

Serbian politician

Zoran Subotički (Serbian Cyrillic: Зоран Суботички; born 21 June 1960) is an author, academic, and former politician in Serbia. He served in the Assembly of Serbia and Montenegro from 2004 to 2006 and the National Assembly of Serbia from 2006 to 2007 as a member of G17 Plus.

== Early life, academic career, and literary works ==
Subotički was born in Bečej, Autonomous Province of Vojvodina, in what was then the People's Republic of Serbia in the Federal People's Republic of Yugoslavia. He graduated and received a master's degree from the University of Novi Sad's Faculty of Philosophy in the department of Yugoslav literature, general literature, and the Serbo-Croatian language, and he taught Renaissance and Baroque literature at the same faculty from 1988 to 2002. Subotički has written a number of books, including Užas i lepota smeha - Poetika smeha Miloša Crnjanskog (1988), Snovi i kultura Renesanse (2000), and Čudesni svet Dunđerskih (2021). His play, Od raja do beznjenice (2017), focusing on the historical romance of Laza Kostić and Lenka Dunđerski, was premiered in Belgrade in 2017.

== Politician ==
Subotički was elected to the Bečej municipal assembly in the 1996 Serbian local elections as a candidate of the Zajedno coalition, a coalition of parties opposed to the authoritarian rule of Slobodan Milošević and his allies. He was re-elected in the 2000 local elections as a candidate of the Democratic Opposition of Serbia (DOS), a successor of sorts to the previous coalition.

He was a G17 Plus candidate in the 2003 Serbian parliamentary election, appearing in the 222nd position out of 250 on the party's electoral list. The list won thirty-four seats, and he was not initially included in the party's assembly delegation. (From 2000 to 2011, mandates in Serbian parliamentary elections were awarded to sponsoring parties or coalitions rather than individual candidates, and it was common practice for the mandates to be assigned out of numerical order. Subotički could have received an assembly mandate notwithstanding his low position on the list, which was in any event mostly alphabetical.)

By virtue of its performance in the 2003 Serbian election, G17 Plus had the right to appoint twelve members of the Assembly of Serbia and Montenegro in February 2004. Subotički was appointed to the federal assembly as part of the G17 Plus delegation and served for the next two years. The assembly ceased to exist in 2006 when Montenegro declared independence.

Subotički was belatedly appointed to the national assembly on 16 May 2006 as the replacement for another G17 Plus member. He served as a parliamentarian over the following year and was elected to the party's presidency in September 2006. He appeared on the list of G17 Plus for the 2007 Serbian parliamentary election and was this time not awarded a mandate.

Subotički also ran for mayor of Bečej in the 2004 local elections and again in a 2006 by-election and was defeated both times. In the 2004 Vojvodina provincial election, he appeared in the third position on the G17 Plus list, which did not cross the electoral threshold to win representation in the provincial assembly.

He left G17 Plus after the 2007 parliamentary election and in 2008 created a local political group in Bečej called Kao jedna kuća (English: As One House). He appeared in the fourth position on the group's list for Bečej in the 2008 Serbian local elections. The list won two seats, and he did not take a mandate for the sitting of the municipal assembly that followed. He appears to have left politics after this time.

== Electoral record ==
=== Municipal (Bečej) ===
2006 Bečej municipal by-election Mayor of Bečej - First and Second Round Results
Candidate	Party or Coalition	Votes	%	Votes	%
Dušan Jovanović	Democratic Party of Serbia	2,571	17.05	9,147	65.45
Dragan Živkov Džaja	Serbian Radical Party	2,658	17.63	4,829	34.55
Peter Knezi	Alliance of Vojvodina Hungarians	2,417	16.03		
Živan Gavrilović	Socialist Party of Serbia	1,743	11.56		
Zoran Subotički	G17 Plus	1,741	11.55		
Gordana Kovačev	Democratic Party–Boris Tadić	1,544	10.24		
Šandor Reperger	Strength of Serbia Movement–Bogoljub Karić	908	6.02		
Slobodan Borojević Bata	Citizens' Group	629	4.17		
Sándor Páll	Democratic Fellowship of Vojvodina Hungarians	584	3.87		
Laslo Friš	Democratic Party of Vojvodina Hungarians	282	1.87		
Total valid votes		15,077	100	13,976	100

2004 Bečej municipal election Mayor of Bečej - First and Second Round Results
Candidate	Party or Coalition	Votes	%	Votes	%
Đorđe Predin Badža	People's Democratic Party	1,879	14.26	7,215	53.31
József F. Varga	Coalition: Alliance of Vojvodina Hungarians and Christian Democratic European Movement	3,068	23.29	6,319	46.69
Dragan Živkov Džaja	Serbian Radical Party	1,828	13.87		
Zoran Subotički	G17 Plus	1,821	13.82		
Sándor Páll	Democratic Fellowship of Vojvodina Hungarians	1,500	11.39		
Živan Gavrilović	Socialist Party of Serbia	1,239	9.40		
Zoran Stojšin (incumbent)	Democratic Party	937	7.12		
Šandor Reperger	Strength of Serbia Movement	583	4.43		
Đorđe Tot	Citizens' Group	320	2.43		
Total valid votes		13,175	100	13,534	100

2000 Bečej municipal election Bečej Municipal Assembly – Ing. Ivan Perišič II (First-past-the-post)
Candidate	Party or Coalition	Votes	%
Zoran Subotički (incumbent)	Democratic Opposition of Serbia–Dr. Vojislav Koštunica	512	63.52
Svetlana Gagić Ceca	Socialist Party of Serbia–Yugoslav Left–Slobodan Milošević	198	24.57
Branislav Lozanov	Serbian Radical Party	96	11.91
Total valid votes		806	100

1996 Bečej municipal election Bečej Municipal Assembly – Bečej (division unspecified)
Candidate	Party or Coalition	Result
Zoran Subotički	Zajedno	elected in the second round
other candidates		
