= Milivoj Vrebalov =

Serbian politician

Milivoj Vrebalov (Serbian Cyrillic: Миливој Вребалов; born 12 May 1966) is a politician in Serbia. He was the mayor of Novi Bečej from 2006 to 2012 and a member of the Assembly of Vojvodina from 2008 to 2016, serving for a time as a deputy speaker. At different times, Vrebalov was a member of the Democratic Party (Demokratska stranka, DS) and the Liberal Democratic Party (Liberalno demokratska partija, LDP).

In 2018, he was convicted of abuse of office and sentenced to one year of house arrest.

== Early life and private career ==
Vrebalov was born in Novi Bečej, in what was then the Socialist Republic of Serbia in the Socialist Federal Republic of Yugoslavia. He graduated from the Higher School of Management in Kikinda and later received a degree from Belgrade's College of Vocational Studies. From 1990 to 2006, he worked as a private entrepreneur.

== Politician ==
=== Municipal and provincial politics ===
Vrebalov first ran for the Novi Bečej municipal assembly in the 2004 Serbian local elections, as the lead candidate on an independent electoral list with the name, "For the Good of the Municipality." The list won a single mandate, which, under the municipal election rules in force at the time, was automatically assigned to Vrebalov. He joined the DS in 2005. The party experienced a serious split later in the year, with Čedomir Jovanović forming the LDP as a breakaway group. Vrebalov sided with Jovanović and joined the new party.

Serbia introduced the direct election of mayors in 2004. Aca T. Đukičin, at the time as member of the Reformists of Vojvodina (Reformisti Vojvodine, RV), was elected as mayor of Novi Bečej in the 2004 municipal campaign; he was defeated in a recall vote in April 2006, and a by-election was held shortly thereafter to determine his replacement. Vrebalov ran as the LDP's candidate and was elected in the second round of voting.

The direct election of mayors was abolished at the 2008 Serbian local elections; Vrebalov led the LDP's list to a plurality victory in Novi Bečej with eleven out of thirty-one seats and was chosen for a second term as mayor by the elected members of the new assembly. He was also elected to the Vojvodina provincial assembly in the concurrent 2008 provincial election, winning the Novi Bečej constituency seat in the second round; he was the only LDP member to win a seat in the provincial assembly in this electoral cycle.

Vrebalov was cited as the second best mayor in Europe by the Alliance of Liberals and Democrats for Europe (ALDE) in 2010.

In 2012, the LDP formed a coalition the Serbian Renewal Movement (Srpski pokret obnove, SPO) and other parties, known as Preokret (English: U-Turn). Vrebalov was re-elected for the Novi Bečej division under the coalition's banner in the 2012 provincial election, and, once again, he was the only member of his party to win election at the provincial level. He also led the LDP to another plurality victory in Novi Bečej in the 2012 Serbian local elections, although he did not continue as mayor as this would have constituted a conflict-of-interest under new provincial guidelines.

Vrebalov was chosen as a deputy speaker of the provincial assembly after the 2012 election. The following year, he left the LDP and rejoined the DS, which was at the time the dominant party in Vojvodina's provincial government.

Vojvodina adopted a system of full proportional representation for the 2016 provincial election, and Vrebalov appeared in the twenty-fourth position on a coalition list headed by the DS. The list won only ten mandates, and he was not returned. He also led an independent list that was mostly composed of DS members in the concurrent 2016 local elections in Novi Bečej and was re-elected to the assembly when the list won seven mandates. The Serbian Progressive Party (Srpska napredna stranka, SNS) and its allies formed a new government in the municipality, and Vrebalov served as a member of the opposition. His term ended on 26 December 2019 as the result of his conviction in a criminal trial.

=== At the republic level ===
Vrebalov has been a candidate for the National Assembly of Serbia on four occasions. He appeared on the LDP's electoral lists in the 2007 and 2008 parliamentary elections, although he was not selected for a mandate on either occasion. (From 2000 to 2011, Serbian parliamentary mandates were awarded to sponsoring parties or coalitions rather than to individual candidates, and it was common practice for mandates to be assigned out of numerical order. Vrebalov's specific list position had no formal bearing on his chances of election in either campaign.)

Serbia's electoral system was reformed in 2011, such that mandates were awarded to candidates on successful lists in numerical order. Vrebalov received the 146th position on the Preokret list in the 2012 parliamentary election and was not elected when the list won only nineteen mandates. In the 2014 parliamentary election, he was given the seventy-third position on the DS's coalition list and again missed election when this list also won nineteen seats.

== Arrest and conviction ==
He was arrested in January 2015, on the charge of abuse of office, in relation to alleged embezzlement on reconstruction work at the Heterlend castle in Novi Bečej. He was convicted and sentenced to one year of house arrest in 2018, a decision that was upheld the following year by the Court of Appeals in Novi Sad.

== Electoral record ==
=== Provincial (Vojvodina) ===
2012 Vojvodina assembly election Novi Bečej (constituency seat) - First and Second Rounds
Milivoj Vrebalov (incumbent)	U-Turn	5,214	40.89	5,638	57.35
Stevan Popov	Let's Get Vojvodina Moving: Serbian Progressive Party, New Serbia, Movement of Socialists, Strength of Serbia Movement	2,881	22.60	4,193	42.65
Srđan Glavaški	League of Social Democrats of Vojvodina	1,397	10.96		
Nandor Dvorski	Alliance of Vojvodina Hungarians	1,211	9.50		
Sreća Solarov	Ivica Dačić–Socialist Party of Serbia (SPS), Party of United Pensioners of Serbia (PUPS), United Serbia (JS), Social Democratic Party of Serbia (SDP Serbia)	1,117	8.76		
Petar Kerkez	Serbian Radical Party	930	7.29		
Total valid votes		12,750	100	9,831	100

2008 Vojvodina assembly election Novi Bečej (constituency seat) - First and Second Rounds
Milivoj Vrebalov	Liberal Democratic Party	4,022	31.62	5,002	68.85
Ljubomir Filipov	Serbian Radical Party	2,407	18.92	2,263	31.15
Matija Kovač (list incumbent)	For a European Vojvodina: Democratic Party–G17 Plus, Boris Tadić (Affiliation: Democratic Party)	1,736	13.65		
Tibor Balo	Coalition: Together for Vojvodina - Nenad Čanak	1,336	10.50		
Nandor Dvorski	Hungarian Coalition–István Pásztor	909	7.15		
Branimir Lisičin	Socialist Party of Serbia–Party of United Pensioners of Serbia	846	6.65		
Zoran Trifunac	Vojvodina's Party	776	6.10		
Borislav Santrač	Democratic Party of Serbia–New Serbia	689	5.42		
Total valid votes		12,721	100	7,265	100
Invalid ballots		455		128	
Total votes casts		13,176	63.60	7,393	35.69

=== Municipal (Novi Bečej) ===
2006 Novi Bečej municipal by-election Mayor of Novi Bečej - First and Second Round Results
Candidate	Party or Coalition	Votes	%	Votes	%
Milivoj Vrebalov Miša	Liberal Democratic Party	1,696	20.76	4,136	50.89
Saša Maksimović	Serbian Radical Party	2,013	24.64	3,992	49.11
Radoslav Čokić	Democratic Party of Serbia	1,203	14.72		
Aca T. Ðukičin	Democratic Party	1,021	12.50		
Zoran Trifunac	Citizens' Group: Zoran Trifunac and Citizens	793	9.71		
Branimir Lisičin	Socialist Party of Serbia	598	7.32		
Petar Kerkez	Citizens' Group: Da Pobedimo Prošlost	558	6.83		
Momir Mandić Moma	Party of United Pensioners of Serbia	288	3.53		
Total valid votes		8,170	100	8,128	100
