= 2005 Serbian local elections =

A few municipalities in Serbia held local elections in 2005 for mayors, assembly members, or both. These were not part of the country's regular cycle of local elections, but instead took place in certain jurisdictions where either the local government had fallen or the term of the municipal assembly had expired.

Serbia had introduced the direct election of mayors in 2002. This practice was abandoned with the 2008 Serbian local elections, but it was still in effect in 2005, and some mayor by-elections took place during the year. The constituent municipalities of Belgrade did not have directly elected mayors, and in these jurisdictions mayors were chosen by the elected assembly members.

All assembly elections were held under proportional representation with a three per cent electoral threshold. Successful lists were required to receive three per cent of all votes, not only of valid votes.

== Results ==
=== Vojvodina ===
==== Bačka Palanka ====
The Serbian Radical Party and the Socialist Party of Serbia formed a coalition government in Bačka Palanka after the 2004 election. In August 2005, the Serbian government dismissed the local administration on the grounds that the assembly had never been properly constituted and introduced a five-member temporary council pending a new local election on 18 December. Dragan Bozalo, the municipal's directly elected mayor, was not affected by this decision and remained in office.

The results of the assembly election were:

Party	Votes	%	Seats
Serbian Radical Party	6,574	27.78	14
Democratic Party	3,617	15.28	8
Socialist Party of Serbia	2,474	10.45	5
Strength of Serbia Movement	2,422	10.23	5
Democratic Party of Serbia	1,817	7.68	4
G17 Plus	1,591	6.72	4
Serbian Renewal Movement	740	3.13	2
Total			42
Registered voters/turnout		49.61	

Only parties or allies that won seats are listed.

==== Bečej ====
Bečej mayor Đorđe Predin was defeated in a recall election on 12 December 2005.

Choice	Votes	%
For	4,350	53.55
Against	3,773	46.45
Total	8,123	100.00
Valid votes	8,123	97.64
Invalid/blank votes	196	2.36
Total votes	8,319	100.00
Registered voters/turnout	34,036	24.44
Source: The votes were "for" and "against" the recall of the sitting mayor.

A by-election to selection Predin's replacement was held in early 2006. Peter Knezi of the Alliance of Vojvodina Hungarians had previously served as deputy mayor and may have been acting mayor during the election period.

=== Central Serbia (excluding Belgrade) ===
==== Niš ====
Niš mayor Smiljko Kostić remained in office following a recall election on 4 December 2005.

Choice	%
No on recall	62.52
Yes on recall	35.95
Total valid votes	100
Source: CeSID

==== Smederevo ====
Smederevo mayor Jasna Avramović was defeated in a recall election on 25 December 2005. The preliminary results were:

Choice	Votes	%
Yes on recall	9,450	52.95
No on recall	8,397	47.05
Total valid votes	17,847	100
Source: CeSID

An election to determine her successor as mayor was held in 2006.

==== Preševo ====
On Sunday, November 20, voters in the municipality of Preševo to vote on the initiative Preševo Municipal Assembly for the recall of the president of municipality Riza Halimi. Riza Halimi lost election with 53 per cent for recall and 47 against. After elections Municipal Assembly elected Ragmi Mustafa as his successor.

Recall elections of Riza Halimi, president of the municipality of Preševo
Choice	Votes	%
For	7,289	53.22
Against	6,407	46.78
Total	13,696	100.00
Valid votes	13,696	98.91
Invalid/blank votes	151	1.09
Total votes	13,847	100.00
Registered voters/turnout	29,775	46.51
Source: CeSID
