= Predrag Umičević =

Serbian engineer and politician

Predrag Umičević (Serbian Cyrillic: Предраг Умичевић; born 4 September 1963) is a Serbian engineer and former politician. He served in the National Assembly of Serbia from 2007 to 2008 and was the mayor of Smederevo from 2008 to 2012. During his time as an elected official, Umićević was a member of the Democratic Party (Demokratska stranka, DS).

== Early life and career ==
Umičević was born in Smederevo, in what was then the Socialist Republic of Serbia in the Socialist Federal Republic of Yugoslavia. He graduated from the University of Belgrade's Faculty of Mechanical Engineering with a major in mechanization and took postgraduate studies at the Faculty of Occupational Safety in Niš. He oversaw the metal design company SZMR (which produced grid metal structures) from 1990 to 2004, and from 1996 to 2006 he was the owner and director of the company "Metaling PUT."

== Politician ==
=== Early years (2002–06) ===
In 2000, the Democratic Party participated in the Democratic Opposition of Serbia (Demokratska opozicija Srbije, DOS), a broad and ideological diverse coalition of parties opposed to Slobodan Milošević's administration. The DOS won a majority victory in Smederevo in the 2000 Serbian local elections, and the DS afterward participated in the local government. Umičević was appointed to the city's executive board in 2002 with responsibility for entrepreneurship. The following year, the local DOS administration fell apart and the DS came to power on its own; Umičević was promoted to president of the executive board. He served in this role until another change in government in March 2004. In September 2003, he hosted a Days of European Heritage event in the city.

Serbia introduced the direct election of mayors in the 2004 Serbian local elections, and the mayoral election in Smederevo was won by Jasna Avramović of the "Movement for Smederevo." She was defeated in a recall election the following year, and a by-election was held in early 2006 to determine her successor. Umičević ran as the Democratic Party's candidate and was defeated in the second round by a candidate of the rival Democratic Party of Serbia (Demokratska stranka Srbije, DSS).

=== Parliamentarian (2007–08) ===
Umičević received the 240th position (out of 250) on the Democratic Party's electoral list for the National Assembly of Serbia in the 2007 Serbian parliamentary election. The list won sixty-four seats, and he was included in his party's delegation when the new assembly convened. (From 2000 to 2011, Serbian parliamentary mandates were awarded to sponsoring parties or coalitions rather than individual candidates, and it was common practice for the mandates to be assigned out of numerical order. Umičević's position on the list – which was in any event mostly alphabetical – had no specific bearing on his chances of election.) The DS formed an unstable coalition government with the DSS and G17 Plus after the election, and Umičević served as a supporter of the administration. He was a member of the committee for industry, the committee for transport and communications, and the committee for privatization.

The DS–DSS alliance broke down in early 2008, and a new assembly election was called for March 2008. Umičević received the 228th position on the DS-led For a European Serbia (Za evropsku Srbiju, ZES) list and was again chosen for a mandate when the list won 102 seats. The election results were inconclusive, but ZES eventually formed a new government with the Socialist Party of Serbia (Socijalistička partija Srbije, SPS).

=== Mayor of Smederevo (2008–12) ===
Serbia abandoned the direct election of mayors with the 2008 Serbian local elections. The Democratic Party won fourteen seats in the Smederevo city assembly in this cycle and afterward formed a new local coalition government with other parties. Umičević, who appeared third on the DS's list, was elected to the city assembly and was afterward chosen as mayor by a vote of the elected delegates. He resigned from the national assembly eleven days later, contending that there was a conflict of interest between the positions and that he would need to devote more time to his responsibilities at the city level.

As mayor, Umičević promoted a land-lease deal with the company Komiko Oil to construct a refinery on city-owned land. The local assembly initially rejected his proposal in January 2012; Umičević blamed this on a misunderstanding, and ultimately the deal was approved in April of the same year. (The project was later cancelled by his successor's administration for non-payment of land fees.)

Umičević led the DS's list for Smederevo in the 2012 local elections and was re-elected to the local assembly when the list won twelve mandates. The DS list finished second against Jasna Avramović's list; Avramović was able to form a new coalition government after the election, and Umičević's term as mayor came to an end. He served in the assembly for the next four years and did not seek re-election in 2016.

== Electoral record ==
=== Local (Smederevo) ===
2006 Municipality of Smederevo local by-election: Mayor of Smederevo
Candidate	Party	First round		Second round	
Candidate	Party	Votes	%	Votes	%
Saša Radosavljević	Democratic Party of Serbia	6,102		16,428	53.38
Predrag Umičević	Democratic Party	7,577		14,349	46.62
Dragan Čolić	Serbian Radical Party	5,825			
Tomislav Petrović	Liberal Democratic Party				
Dejan Reljić	Strength of Serbia Movement				
Bogoljub Spasojević	Citizens' Group: For a Better Village, For a Better City				
Slaviša Stevanović	Citizens' Group: Coalition for a Better Smederevo				
Vladimir Todorović	Citizens' Group: Movement for Smederevo				
Dušan Trajković	G17 Plus				
Zoran Zarić	Socialist Party of Serbia				
Total				30,777	100.00
