= Nenad Milenković =

Serbian politician

Nenad Milenković (Serbian Cyrillic: Ненад Миленковић; born 19 February 1972) is a former politician in Serbia. He was briefly a member of the National Assembly of Serbia from 2007 to 2008 and served as mayor of the Belgrade municipality of New Belgrade from 2008 to 2012. A member of the Democratic Party (Demokratska stranka, DS) while an elected official, he later became a founding member of Together for Serbia (Zajedno za Srbiju, ZZS).

== Private career ==
Milenković was born in Belgrade, in what was then the Socialist Republic of Serbia in the Socialist Federal Republic of Yugoslavia. He holds a degree in economics.

== Politician ==
=== Elected official ===
Milenković appeared in the second position on the Democratic Party's electoral list for the municipal assembly of New Belgrade in the 2004 Serbian local elections and was elected when the list won a plurality victory with twenty-eight out of sixty-seven seats.

He received the 140th position on the DS's list in the 2007 Serbian parliamentary election. The list won sixty-four mandates, and he was not initially chosen for his party's delegation. (From 2000 to 2011, mandates in Serbian parliamentary elections were awarded to sponsoring parties or coalitions rather than individual candidates, and it was common practice for the mandates to be assigned out of numerical order. Milenković's position on the list – which was in any event largely alphabetical – had no formal bearing on whether he received a mandate.)

On 14 November 2007, he was awarded a mandate as a replacement for another party member who had left the national assembly. During this period, the Democratic Party was part of an unstable coalition government with the rival Democratic Party of Serbia (Demokratska stranka Srbije, DSS), and Milenković served as part of the administration's majority. His term was brief; a new assembly election was called in 2008, and Milenković was not a candidate.

Milenković led the DS's list to another plurality victory in New Belgrade for the 2008 local elections and was afterwards chosen as mayor. He served in this role for the next four years. He also appeared on the DS's list for the City Assembly of Belgrade in the 2008 local elections and was awarded a mandate when the list won a plurality victory with forty-five out of 110 seats.

=== Departure from DS and after ===
Following the DS's defeat in the 2012 Serbian parliamentary election, Dragan Đilas was selected as the party's new leader. Milenković opposed Đilas's leadership and left the party to join the breakaway Together for Serbia party, serving as the leader of its Belgrade board.

In December 2013, Milenković was arrested on a charge of embezzlement pertaining to his time as mayor of New Belgrade. Online accounts do not indicate how the matter was resolved.
