= 2008 Serbian local elections =

Local elections were held in Serbia on 11 May 2008, concurrently with the 2008 Serbian parliamentary election and the 2008 Vojvodina provincial election. A re-vote was held at three poling stations in Belgrade on 18 May 2008 due to irregularities in the voting process.

== Background ==
According to the Constitutional Law adopted by the National Assembly on 30 September 2006 that proclaimed the new constitution, the parliamentary Speaker (at that time Oliver Dulić from DS) had to schedule the elections for local administrative units by 31 December 2007. He scheduled them on 2007-12-29. Following the official breakdown of the government on 8 March 2008, early parliamentary elections were held on the same date.

Negotiations between the ruling parties, the President's DS and the Premier's DSS, were trying to enact a compromise on the date of the election. Tadić's Democratic Party wanted to respect the constitutional law, wanting to schedule the election by the end of year and hold it in March 2008, which is DSS's demand because of the solution of the status of Kosovo. G17 Plus wanted the Mayors and municipal Presidents to be elected directly as in the past, but the Democratic Party wanted them to be elected by the local parliaments.

Four laws necessary for the local elections (on territorial organisation, the capital, local elections and local self-government) were passed before the elections.

There were some notable changes from the previous local electoral cycle in 2004:

- the direct election of mayors was eliminated, and mayors were instead chosen by elected members of the assemblies;
- the electoral threshold was increased from three to five per cent (of all votes, not only of valid votes);
- all assembly mandates were awarded to candidates on successful lists at the discretion of the sponsoring parties or coalitions, irrespective of numerical order.

In areas geographically comprising Sandžak, the Sandžak Democratic Party and Democratic Party ran in local elections together. The European Coalition of DS, G17+ and SPO ran in all Municipalities and Cities, except in Niš, where G17+ had been part of ruling coalition for the last years and where DS was running against them. The "Serb List" political of SRS, DSS, NS, SPS and several nationalist civic groups and organizations had been formed and ran in most of Vojvodina locally.

My Serbia of Branislav Lečić ran individually in local elections. Mayor of Novi Sad and former Radical Maja Gojković ran in the City with her civic group "For Our Novi Sad".

== Kosovo ==
According to UNMIK practice, Serbian national referendums and elections for Parliament and President were allowed in Kosovo, but local elections are organized separately by UNMIK and the PISG. Despite all of this Serbia accomplished the local elections in Kosovo 2008 that were not recognized by UNMIK.

== Repeat elections ==
The municipalities of Knjaževac, Prijepolje, Ruma, and Vrnjačka Banja were not able to form governments after the election. Repeat elections were held in these municipalities on 9 November 2008.

== Results ==
=== Belgrade ===
==== City of Belgrade ====
Results of the election for the City Assembly of Belgrade:

Party	Votes	%	Seats
For a European Belgrade–Boris Tadić (Democratic Party, G17 Plus)	354,462	39.77	45
Serbian Radical Party–Tomislav Nikolić	316,357	35.50	40
Democratic Party of Serbia–New Serbia–Vojislav Koštunica	100,459	11.27	12
Liberal Democratic Party–Čedomir Jovanović	62,149	6.97	7
SPS–PUPS–JS	47,266	5.30	6
Green Party (Zelena Stranka)	3,738	0.42	–
Strength of Serbia Movement–Bogoljub Karić	2,698	0.30	–
Roma Unification Party	1,452	0.16	–
Romani Parties–Srđan Šajn, Roma Party of Unification and Romani Renewal Movement	1,404	0.16	–
People's Radical Party–People's Movement for Belgrade	1,230	0.14	–
Total	891,215	100.00	110
Valid votes	891,485	98.63	
Invalid/blank votes	12,415	1.37	
Total votes	903,900	100.00	
Registered voters/turnout	1,517,783	59.55	

The City of Belgrade election, like the concurrent national assembly election, did not initially produce a clear winner. Representatives of the Radical Party, the Democratic Party of Serbia–New Serbia alliance, and the alliance around the Socialist Party held discussions about forming government; had these parties finalized an agreement, Aleksandar Vučić of the Radical Party would have become mayor.

Ultimately, however, For a European Serbia formed a coalition government with the alliance around the Socialist Party. The Liberal Democratic Party was not a part of the coalition but offered outside support. Dragan Đilas of the Democratic Party became mayor and Milan Krkobabić of the Party of United Pensioners of Serbia (aligned with the Socialist Party) became deputy mayor.

Branislav Belić served as mayor on an interim basis from July to August 2008, before Đilas was sworn in.

==== Municipalities of Belgrade ====
Elections were held in all seventeen of Belgrade's constituent municipalities in 2008. The elections were generally a victory for the For a European Serbia alliance led by the Democratic Party, which ultimately won the mayor's office in twelve municipalities. The Democratic Party of Serbia did not finish in first place in any municipalities, but party representatives became mayors in three municipalities: Grocka and Mladenovac in alliance with the Democratic Party, and Lazarevac in alliance with the Radical Party. The Radicals held the mayoralty in their historical stronghold of Zemun, and former Socialist Živorad Milosavljević's independent list retained power in Sopot.

This was the last time the Radical Party was the dominant party in any municipal government in Belgrade. The party split later in the year, and the breakaway Serbian Progressive Party ultimately superseded the Radicals in popular support.

Many of the governing coalitions formed after the election were unstable, and new elections were held in the municipalities of Voždovac and Zemun in 2009.

===== Barajevo =====
Results of the election for the Municipal Assembly of Barajevo:

Party	Votes	%	Seats
Barajevo for a European Serbia–Boris Tadić (Democratic Party, G17 Plus)	4,340	30.94	11
Serbian Radical Party–Tomislav Nikolić	4,286	30.56	10
Democratic Party of Serbia–Vojislav Koštunica	2,126	15.16	5
New Serbia–Velimir Ilić	1,613	11.50	4
Socialist Party of Serbia	1,235	8.81	3
Liberal Democratic Party–Čedomir Jovanović	295	2.10	–
Ecological Party of Serbia "Oak"	130	0.93	–
Total	14,025	100.00	33
Valid votes	14,025	98.39	
Invalid/blank votes	230	1.61	
Total votes	14,255	100.00	
Registered voters/turnout	21,723	65.62	

Branka Savić of the Democratic Party was chosen as mayor after the election. The local government was formed by the Democratic Party, the Democratic Party of Serbia, New Serbia, and the Socialist Party.

===== Čukarica =====
Results of the election for the Municipal Assembly of Čukarica:

Party	Votes	%	Seats
Čukarica for a European Serbia–Boris Tadić (Democratic Party, G17 Plus)	36,826	39.01	20
Serbian Radical Party–Tomislav Nikolić	32,011	33.91	17
Democratic Party of Serbia–Vojislav Koštunica–Branislav Tomić	9,871	10.46	5
Liberal Democratic Party–Čedomir Jovanović	5,751	6.09	3
Socialist Party of Serbia–Party of United Pensioners of Serbia	4,652	4.93	–
Citizens' Group: Your Čukarica, Your Rules–Viktor Savić	2,423	2.57	–
Citizens' Group: Neighbour Rather Than Party	1,622	1.72	–
New Serbia–Strength of Serbia Movement–Velimir Ilić	1,234	1.31	–
Total	94,390	100.00	45
Valid votes	94,390	98.54	
Invalid/blank votes	1,400	1.46	
Total votes	95,790	100.00	
Registered voters/turnout	163,174	58.70	

Milan Tlačinac of the Democratic Party was chosen as mayor after the election. The municipal government was formed by the Democratic Party and G17 Plus (both from the For a European Serbia alliance) and the Liberal Democratic Party.

===== Grocka =====
Results of the election for the Municipal Assembly of Grocka:

Party	Votes	%	Seats
Serbian Radical Party–Tomislav Nikolić	12,471	33.21	13
Grocka for a European Serbia–Boris Tadić (Democratic Party, G17 Plus)	8,633	22.99	9
Citizens' Group: Strength of the Citizens–For Our New Municipality	4,123	10.98	4
Citizens' Group: Our Man–Blažo Stojanović	3,637	9.69	4
Democratic Party of Serbia–Vojislav Koštunica	3,553	9.46	3
Socialist Party of Serbia–Milan Janković - Žire	2,495	6.64	2
Citizens' Group: And Grocka Is Belgrade	726	1.93	–
Liberal Democratic Party–Čedomir Jovanović	630	1.68	–
New Serbia–SDPO–Velimir Ilić	616	1.64	–
Movement of Veterans of Serbia–Milovan Zubković	323	0.86	–
Roma Union of Serbia–Dr. Rajko Đurić	192	0.51	–
Citizens' Association "Eco Metropolis"	153	0.41	–
Total	37,552	100.00	35
Valid votes	37,552	97.80	
Invalid/blank votes	843	2.20	
Total votes	38,395	100.00	
Registered voters/turnout	64,632	59.41	

The election did not produce a clear winner. Zoran Jovanović of the Democratic Party of Serbia was chosen as mayor after the election; the Democratic Party of Serbia, Democratic Party, Socialist Party, and Strength of the Citizens formed the municipal government. After a shift in the municipality's political alliances, Milan Janković of the Socialist Party became mayor on 22 June 2010.

===== Lazarevac =====
Results of the election for the Municipal Assembly of Lazarevac:

Party	Votes	%	Seats
Lazarevac for a European Serbia–Boris Tadić (Democratic Party, G17 Plus)	8,544	25.64	18
Democratic Party of Serbia–Dr. Vojislav Koštunica	6,799	20.41	14
Serbian Radical Party–Tomislav Nikolić	6,300	18.91	13
SPS–PUPS–PSS–Slavoljub Pavlović Kolubarac	4,053	12.16	8
Club of Lazarevac Supporters–Radomir Đaković	2,180	6.54	4
New Serbia–Velimir Ilić	2,179	6.54	4
Liberal Democratic Party–Čedomir Jovanović	947	2.84	–
United Serbia–Dragan Marković Palma	847	2.54	–
Ecological Movement–Green Coalition	764	2.29	–
National Front of Lazarevac Radicals, Village and City Coalition and the People's Radical Party–Goran Ristović Rile	264	0.79	–
Integration Republican Party	259	0.78	–
Roma Union of Serbia–Dr. Rajko Đurić	181	0.54	–
Total	33,317	100.00	61
Valid votes	33,317	97.24	
Invalid/blank votes	947	2.76	
Total votes	34,264	100.00	
Registered voters/turnout	50,824	67.42	

The election did not produce a clear winner. Incumbent mayor Branko Borić of the Democratic Party of Serbia was confirmed for another term in office following the election. The local government was formed by the Democratic Party of Serbia, the Radicals, New Serbia, and the Socialist Party of Serbia–Party of United Pensioners of Serbia alliance.

===== Mladenovac =====
Results of the election for the Municipal Assembly of Mladenovac:

Party	Votes	%	Seats
Serbian Radical Party–Tomislav Nikolić	8,059	28.72	20
Mladenovac – For a European Serbia–Boris Tadić (Democratic Party, G17 Plus, Serbian Renewal Movement)	6,732	23.99	16
Democratic Party of Serbia–New Serbia–Vojislav Koštunica	3,615	12.88	8
United Serbia Dragan Marković Palma	2,574	9.17	6
Alliance for the Revival of Mladenovac–Predrag Čokić	2,052	7.31	5
Socialist Party of Serbia (SPS)–Party of United Pensioners of Serbia (PUPS)	1,295	4.61	–
Liberal Democratic Party–Čedomir Jovanović and United for Mladenovac–Citizens' Alliance	1,147	4.09	–
Political Organization "For Mladenovac – Together" Gradimir Milinković Grada	766	2.73	–
Citizens' Group: "Kosmaj" Velimir Jovanović–Bata Šicko	626	2.23	–
Citizens' Group: Serbian Home Milorad Kostić Kole	413	1.47	–
Citizens' Group: With Heart for a Better Mladenovac Dušan Ivanović Libijac	411	1.46	–
Roma Union of Serbia–Saša Simić	372	1.33	–
Total	28,062	100.00	55
Valid votes	28,062	96.86	
Invalid/blank votes	911	3.14	
Total votes	28,973	100.00	
Registered voters/turnout	46,301	62.58	

The election did not produce a clear winner. Branislav Jovanović of the Democratic Party of Serbia was chosen as mayor, by a vote of twenty-nine to twenty-six. The municipal government was formed by For a European Serbia, the Democratic Party of Serbia–New Serbia alliance, and Alliance for the Revival of Mladenovac.

===== New Belgrade =====
Results of the election for the Municipal Assembly of New Belgrade:

Party	Votes	%	Seats
New Belgrade for a European Serbia–Boris Tadić (Democratic Party, G17 Plus)	54,883	42.89	30
Serbian Radical Party–Tomislav Nikolić	41,062	32.09	22
Democratic Party of Serbia–Vojislav Koštunica	12,638	9.88	6
Liberal Democratic Party–Čedomir Jovanović	10,221	7.99	5
Socialist Party of Serbia (SPS)–Party of United Pensioners of Serbia (PUPS)–Strength of Serbia Movement (PSS)	8,267	6.46	4
New Serbia - For New Belgrade–Velimir Ilić	901	0.70	–
Total	127,972	100.00	67
Valid votes	127,972	98.58	
Invalid/blank votes	1,843	1.42	
Total votes	129,815	100.00	
Registered voters/turnout	212,099	61.20	

Nenad Milenković of the Democratic Party was chosen as mayor after the election. Maja Videnović appeared in the ninth position on the Democratic Party's list but did not take a mandate.

===== Obrenovac =====
Results of the election for the Municipal Assembly of Obrenovac:

Party	Votes	%	Seats
Obrenovac for a European Serbia–Boris Tadić (Democratic Party, G17 Plus)	11,744	31.01	19
Serbian Radical Party–Tomislav Nikolić	10,007	26.42	17
Citizens' Group: "Obrenovac – Our City" Svetozar Dobrašinović Toza	3,869	10.21	6
Socialist Party of Serbia–Mr. Zoran Kostić	2,941	7.76	5
Democratic Party of Serbia–Vojislav Koštunica	2,427	6.41	4
Citizens' Group: Obrenovac Association	2,370	6.26	4
Green Obrenovac–Ivan Karić	1,793	4.73	–
Liberal Democratic Party–Čedomir Jovanović	1,771	4.68	–
New Serbia Whole and European–Dr. Vet. Živorad Kostić	955	2.52	–
Total	37,877	100.00	55
Valid votes	37,877	97.81	
Invalid/blank votes	850	2.19	
Total votes	38,727	100.00	
Registered voters/turnout	62,786	61.68	

Željko Jovetić of the Democratic Party was chosen as mayor after the election.

Ivan Karić led the Green Obrenovac list.

===== Palilula =====
Results of the election for the Municipal Assembly of Palilula:

Party	Votes	%	Seats
Palilula for a European Serbia–Boris Tadić (Democratic Party, G17 Plus)	34,983	41.04	24
Serbian Radical Party–Tomislav Nikolić	28,584	33.53	19
Democratic Party of Serbia–New Serbia–Vojislav Koštunica	8,907	10.45	6
Liberal Democratic Party–Čedomir Jovanović	5,566	6.53	3
Socialist Party of Serbia–Party of United Pensioners of Serbia–United Serbia	4,471	5.24	3
Dunavski Venac Party–Dr. Dragan Mladenović	2,267	2.66	–
People's Radical Party–Tomislav Jovanović	472	0.55	–
Total	85,250	100.00	55
Valid votes	85,250	98.52	
Invalid/blank votes	1,282	1.48	
Total votes	86,532	100.00	
Registered voters/turnout	153,325	56.44	

Incumbent mayor Danilo Bašić of the Democratic Party was confirmed for another term in office after the election, receiving thirty out of fifty-five votes. The municipal government was formed by For a European Serbia, the Liberal Democratic Party, and the alliance around the Socialist Party.

===== Rakovica =====
Results of the election for the Municipal Assembly of Rakovica:

Party	Votes	%	Seats
Rakovica for a European Serbia–Boris Tadić (Democratic Party, G17 Plus)	22,817	39.84	29
Serbian Radical Party–Tomislav Nikolić	19,954	34.84	25
Democratic Party of Serbia–New Serbia–Vojislav Koštunica	6,330	11.05	8
Socialist Party of Serbia (SPS)–Party of United Pensioners of Serbia (PUPS)–PSS–Duśan Đaković	3,614	6.31	4
Liberal Democratic Party–Čedomir Jovanović	3,406	5.95	4
Our Rakovica SDPO–Vojislav Mihailović For a United Serbia–Željko Teodosijević	1,154	2.01	–
Total	57,275	100.00	70
Valid votes	57,275	98.49	
Invalid/blank votes	876	1.51	
Total votes	58,151	100.00	
Registered voters/turnout	97,104	59.89	

Incumbent mayor Bojan Milić of the Democratic Party was confirmed for a new term in office after the election. The governing majority consisted of For a European Serbia, the alliance around the Socialist Party, and the Liberal Democratic Party.

Zoran Krasić was the lead candidate on the Radical Party's list, although he did not take a seek in the assembly afterwards.

===== Savski Venac =====
Results of the election for the Municipal Assembly of Savski Venac:

Party	Votes	%	Seats
Savski Venac for a European Serbia–Boris Tadić (Democratic Party, G17 Plus)	11,770	45.64	17
Serbian Radical Party–Tomislav Nikolić	6,170	23.92	9
Democratic Party of Serbia–New Serbia–Vojislav Koštunica	3,354	13.00	5
Liberal Democratic Party–Čedomir Jovanović	2,633	10.21	4
Socialist Party of Serbia (SPS)–Party of United Pensioners of Serbia	1,864	7.23	2
Total	25,791	100.00	37
Valid votes	25,791	98.56	
Invalid/blank votes	377	1.44	
Total votes	26,168	100.00	
Registered voters/turnout	43,824	59.71	

Incumbent mayor Tomislav Đorđević of the Democratic Party was confirmed for another term in office after the election. The government was formed by the Democratic Party and G17 Plus (both from the For a European Serbia alliance) and the Liberal Democratic Party. Parliamentarians Nataša Vučković and Nenad Konstantinović were elected as Democratic Party candidates.

===== Sopot =====
Results of the election for the Municipal Assembly of Sopot:

Party	Votes	%	Seats
Citizens' Group: For the Municipality of Sopot–Živorad – Žika Milosavljević	3,581	32.94	13
Serbian Radical Party–Tomislav Nikolić	2,372	21.82	9
Sopot for a European Serbia–Boris Tadić (Democratic Party, G17 Plus)	1,554	14.29	5
Citizens' Group: Vladan Lukić	1,218	11.20	4
Citizens' Group: For Truth and Justice Maksimović Predrag Maksa	604	5.56	2
Socialist Party of Serbia–Strength of Serbia Movement	534	4.91	–
Democratic Party of Serbia–Vojislav Koštunica	447	4.11	–
New Serbia–Liberals of Serbia–Velimir Ilić	247	2.27	–
Serbian Renewal Movement Sopot–Dragoslav Todorović	181	1.66	–
Roma Unification Party	134	1.23	–
Total	10,872	100.00	33
Valid votes	10,872	96.88	
Invalid/blank votes	350	3.12	
Total votes	11,222	100.00	
Registered voters/turnout	17,217	65.18	

Incumbent mayor Živorad Milosavljević of the For the Municipality of Sopot list was confirmed for another term in office after the election.

===== Stari Grad =====
Results of the election for the Municipal Assembly of Stari Grad:

Party	Votes	%	Seats
Stari Grad for a European Serbia–Boris Tadić (Democratic Party, G17 Plus)	15,926	46.03	28
Serbian Radical Party–Tomislav Nikolić	6,164	17.82	11
Democratic Party of Serbia–Vojislav Koštunica	5,046	14.58	9
Liberal Democratic Party–Čedomir Jovanović	4,918	14.21	8
Socialist Party of Serbia (SPS)–Party of United Pensioners of Serbia (PUPS)	1,504	4.35	–
Neighbours for Stari Grad–Predrag Rajčević (Citizens' Group: Neighbours for Stari Grad, Serbian League, Strength of Serbia Movement, Serbian Renewal Movement, Liberals of Serbia–Movement for Stari Grad, Belgrade Pobednik)	712	2.06	–
New Serbia–Movement of Veterans of Serbia–Velimir Ilić	330	0.95	–
Total	34,600	100.00	56
Valid votes	34,600	98.57	
Invalid/blank votes	501	1.43	
Total votes	35,101	100.00	
Registered voters/turnout	59,448	59.04	

Incumbent mayor Mirjana Božidarević of the Democratic Party was confirmed for another term in office after the election.

Nemanja Šarović appeared in the lead position on the Radical Party's list, although he did not take a mandate when the assembly convened. Miljan Damjanović, who appeared in the seventh position on the Radical list, received a mandate and ultimately led the party's group in the assembly from 2008 to 2012.

===== Surčin =====
Results of the election for the Municipal Assembly of Surčin:

Party	Votes	%	Seats
Serbian Radical Party–Tomislav Nikolić	7,857	38.25	15
Surčin for a European Serbia–Boris Tadić (Democratic Party, G17 Plus, Serbian Renewal Movement, Social Democratic Party)	5,951	28.97	12
People's Movement–Dr. Vladan Janićijević	2,862	13.93	5
Movement for a Rich Surčin	1,750	8.52	3
Socialist Party of Serbia (SPS)–Movement of Veterans of Serbia	858	4.18	–
Democratic Party of Serbia–Vojislav Koštunica	780	3.80	–
Liberal Democratic Party–Čedomir Jovanović	296	1.44	–
New Serbia–Velimir Ilić	185	0.90	–
Total	20,539	100.00	35
Valid votes	20,539	98.24	
Invalid/blank votes	369	1.76	
Total votes	20,908	100.00	
Registered voters/turnout	33,538	62.34	

The election did not produce a clear winner. Incumbent mayor Vojislav Janošević of the Democratic Party was ultimately confirmed for another term in office after the election.

===== Voždovac =====
Results of the election for the Municipal Assembly of Voždovac:

Party	Votes	%	Seats
Voždovac for a European Serbia–Boris Tadić (Democratic Party, G17 Plus, Serbian Renewal Movement)	35,600	41.98	24
Serbian Radical Party–Tomislav Nikolić	25,702	30.31	17
Democratic Party of Serbia–New Serbia–Vojislav Koštunica	11,946	14.09	8
Liberal Democratic Party Voždovac–Čedomir Jovanović	6,202	7.31	4
Socialist Party of Serbia–Party of United Pensioners of Serbia	4,493	5.30	3
United Serbia–People's Radical Party–Dragan Marković Palma	853	1.01	–
Total	84,796	100.00	56
Valid votes	84,796	98.54	
Invalid/blank votes	1,252	1.46	
Total votes	86,048	100.00	
Registered voters/turnout	146,839	58.60	

Incumbent mayor Goran Lukačević of the Democratic Party was confirmed for another term in office after the election, with the support of twenty-nine delegates. He was supported by the For a European Serbia coalition, the Liberal Democratic Party, and the Socialist–United Pensioners alliance. Parliamentarian Marina Raguš led the Radical Party's list, though she did not take a seat in the municipal assembly afterwards.

Lukačević announced his resignation as mayor in January 2009, and the president of the assembly resigned at the same time. A new municipal election was held in June 2009.

===== Vračar =====
Results of the election for the Municipal Assembly of Vračar:

Party	Votes	%	Seats
Vračar for a European Serbia–Boris Tadić (Democratic Party, G17 Plus)	18,488	50.88	32
Serbian Radical Party–Tomislav Nikolić	6,890	18.96	11
Democratic Party of Serbia–Vojislav Koštunica	4,587	12.62	7
Liberal Democratic Party–Čedomir Jovanović	4,458	12.27	7
Socialist Party of Serbia (SPS) and Party of United Pensioners of Serbia (PUPS)	1,913	5.26	3
Total	36,336	100.00	60
Valid votes	36,336	98.57	
Invalid/blank votes	527	1.43	
Total votes	36,863	100.00	
Registered voters/turnout	61,897	59.56	

Vračar was the only municipality in Belgrade where the For a European Serbia list won an outright majority. Incumbent mayor Branimir Kuzmanović of the Democratic Party was confirmed afterward for a new term in office.

Konstantin Samofalov of the Democratic Party appeared in the forty-fifth position on the For a European Serbia list – which was mostly alphabetical – and was included in his party's assembly delegation.

===== Zemun =====
Results of the election for the Municipal Assembly of Zemun:

Party	Votes	%	Seats
Serbian Radical Party–Tomislav Nikolić	36,364	42.53	28
Zemun for a European Serbia–Boris Tadić (Democratic Party, G17 Plus)	30,379	35.53	24
Democratic Party of Serbia–New Serbia–Vojislav Koštunica	6,782	7.93	5
Liberal Democratic Party–Čedomir Jovanović	3,925	4.59	–
Zemun Movement	3,816	4.46	–
Socialist Party of Serbia–Party of United Pensioners of Serbia–Movement of Veterans of Serbia–Nikola Batanjac	3,740	4.37	–
Roma Parties–Srđan Šajn–Roma Party and Roma Renewal Movement	501	0.59	–
Total	85,507	100.00	57
Valid votes	85,507	98.74	
Invalid/blank votes	1,091	1.26	
Total votes	86,598	100.00	
Registered voters/turnout	149,235	58.03	

Slavko Jerković of the Radical Party was chosen as mayor after the election.

Andreja Mladenović led the Democratic Party of Serbia–New Serbia list, although he did not take a seat in the assembly afterward.

===== Zvezdara =====
Results of the election for the Municipal Assembly of Zvezdara:

Party	Votes	%	Seats
Zvezdara for a European Serbia–Boris Tadić (Democratic Party, G17 Plus)	33,790	44.05	24
Serbian Radical Party–Tomislav Nikolić	23,147	30.18	17
DSS–Dr. Vojislav Koštunica–Milorad Perović	8,115	10.58	6
Liberal Democratic Party–Čedomir Jovanović	5,660	7.38	4
Socialist Party of Serbia (SPS)–Party of United Pensioners of Serbia (PUPS)–Movement of Veterans of Serbia (PVS)	4,030	5.25	2
New Serbia for a New Zvezdara–Velimir Ilić	1,151	1.50	–
I Lugovi Su Zvezdara–Tomislav Ćirić	813	1.06	–
Total	76,706	100.00	53
Valid votes	76,706	98.53	
Invalid/blank votes	1,148	1.47	
Total votes	77,854	100.00	
Registered voters/turnout	133,790	58.19	

Incumbent mayor Milan Popović of the Democratic Party was confirmed for another term in office after the election. Future parliamentarian Marija Leković, at the time a member of the Democratic Party, was appointed to the municipal council (i.e., the executive branch of the municipal government) on 18 March 2009.

=== Vojvodina ===
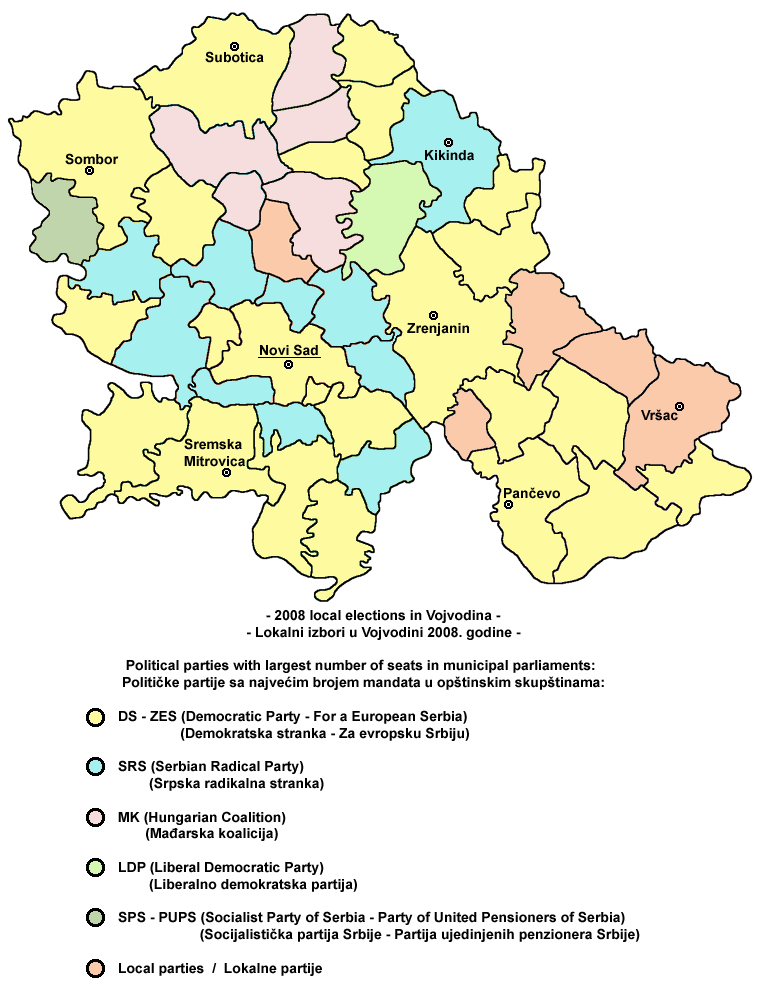
Results of 2008 local elections in Vojvodina by municipality

==== Central Banat District ====
===== Zrenjanin =====
Results of the election for the City Assembly of Zrenjanin:

Party	Votes	%	Seats
"For a European Zrenjanin–Boris Tadić" (Democratic Party, G17 Plus)	22,749	34.65	26
Serbian Radical Party–Tomislav Nikolić	18,803	28.64	22
Together for Vojvodina–League of Social Democrats of Vojvodina–Nenad Čanak	8,411	12.81	9
Democratic Party of Serbia–New Serbia–Vojislav Koštunica	4,038	6.15	4
Equality–Zdravko Deurić	3,676	5.60	4
Socialist Party of Serbia (SPS), Party of United Pensioners of Serbia (PUPS), Movement of Veterans of Serbia (PVS)–Dr. Rodoljub Popov	2,676	4.08	–
Liberal Democratic Party–Čedomir Jovanović	2,579	3.93	–
Hungarian Coalition–István Pásztor	2,087	3.18	2
Ecological Party Dr. Ozrenko Veselinović	633	0.96	–
Total	65,652	100.00	67
Valid votes	65,652	98.12	
Invalid/blank votes	1,256	1.88	
Total votes	66,908	100.00	
Registered voters/turnout	108,727	61.54	

Incumbent mayor Goran Knežević, at the time a member of the Democratic Party, was confirmed for another term in office after the election, leading a coalition that included the League of Social Democrats, the Hungarian Coalition, and the Equality group. Knežević was arrested on corruption charges on 1 October 2008 and dismissed as mayor on 23 April 2009. He was replaced by Mileta Mihajlov, also of the Democratic Party.

Elvira Kovács led the Hungarian Coalition list, although she did not take a mandate afterwards.

===== Nova Crnja =====
Results of the election for the Municipal Assembly of Nova Crnja:

Party	Votes	%	Seats
"For a European Vojvodina–Boris Tadić" (Democratic Party, G17 Plus, League of Social Democrats of Vojvodina)	1,816	28.25	8
Serbian Radical Party–Tomislav Nikolić	1,545	24.03	6
Latinović Dragiša–DHSS	796	12.38	3
DSS–NS	741	11.53	3
MK–István Pásztor	706	10.98	3
SPS–PUPS–PSS–Todorov Mile	538	8.37	2
LDP Čedomir Jovanović–Mile Gavrić	287	4.46	–
Total	6,429	100.00	25
Valid votes	6,429	97.10	
Invalid/blank votes	192	2.90	
Total votes	6,621	100.00	
Registered voters/turnout	9,467	69.94	

Pera Milankov was chosen as mayor after the election, leading a coalition government that included the For a European Vojvodina group. A member of the Democratic Party of Serbia (DSS) at the time of the election, he subsequently joined the Democratic Party (DS).

Attila Juhász appeared in the lead position on the Hungarian Coalition's list and received a mandate.

===== Novi Bečej =====
Results of the election for the Municipal Assembly of Novi Bečej:

Party	Votes	%	Seats
Miša Vrebalov–Liberal Democratic Party	3,571	27.51	11
Serbian Radical Party–Tomislav Nikolić	3,130	24.11	9
"For a European Novi Bečej–Boris Tadić" (Democratic Party and G17 Plus)	2,557	19.70	7
Citizens' Group: "Together for Vojvodina"–Savica Štetin	967	7.45	2
Hungarian Coalition–István Pásztor	845	6.51	2
Socialist Party of Serbia–SPS and Party of United Pensioners of Serbia–PUPS	656	5.05	–
Democratic Party of Serbia–New Serbia–Vojislav Koštunica	555	4.28	–
Citizens' Group: Our People for Our Municipality Zoran Trifunac	405	3.12	–
Roma Unity Party–Vasa Milićev	296	2.28	–
Total	12,982	100.00	31
Valid votes	12,982	98.04	
Invalid/blank votes	260	1.96	
Total votes	13,242	100.00	
Registered voters/turnout	20,717	63.92	

Incumbent mayor Milivoj "Misa" Vrebalov of the Liberal Democratic Party was chosen for another term in office after the election. The Liberal Democrats formed a coalition government with the For a European Novi Bečej group.

Ivica Milankov appeared in the tenth position on the Radical Party's list and was given a mandate when the assembly convened.

===== Sečanj =====
Results of the election for the Municipal Assembly of Sečanj:

Party	Votes	%	Seats
Citizens' Groups (three different lists)	3,826	45.27	19
Serbian Radical Party–Tomislav Nikolić	1,640	19.40	8
For a European Vojvodina (Democratic Party and G17 Plus)	1,137	13.45	6
Socialist Party of Serbia–Party of United Pensioners of Serbia	594	7.03	3
Strength of Serbia Movement–Vojvodina's Party	384	4.54	–
Democratic Party of Serbia	326	3.86	–
League of Social Democrats of Vojvodina	234	2.77	–
Liberal Democratic Party	175	2.07	–
Roma Party–Roma Renewal Movement	136	1.61	–
Total	8,452	100.00	36
Valid votes	8,452	96.95	
Invalid/blank votes	266	3.05	
Total votes	8,718	100.00	
Registered voters/turnout	12,418	70.20	

Incumbent mayor Predrag Milošević, the leader of the independent For the Development of the Municipality of Sečanj list, was confirmed for a new term in office with the support of the For a European Vojvodina group.

===== Žitište =====
Results of the election for the Municipal Assembly of Žitište:

Party	Votes	%	Seats
For a European Vojvodina–Boris Tadić (Democratic Party, G17 Plus)	2,779	26.32	9
Serbian Radical Party–Tomislav Nikolić	1,812	17.16	6
Democratic Party of Serbia–Vojislav Koštunica	1,406	13.32	4
Socialist Party of Serbia (SPS)–Party of United Pensioners of Serbia (PUPS)–Zoran Kasalović	1,163	11.01	3
Ko Gradi Više, Ko Gradi Bolje–(New Serbia–Serbian Renewal Movement)–Darko Karan	1,076	10.19	3
Hungarian Coalition–István Pásztor	962	9.11	3
Together for Vojvodina–LSV–Nenad Čanak	894	8.47	3
Liberal Democratic Party–Čedomir Jovanović	231	2.19	–
Equality–Zdravko Deurić	184	1.74	–
Roma Party–Roma Renewal Movement	52	0.49	–
Total	10,559	100.00	31
Valid votes	10,559	97.37	
Invalid/blank votes	285	2.63	
Total votes	10,844	100.00	
Registered voters/turnout	16,071	67.48	

Dragan Milenković of the Democratic Party was chosen as mayor after the election.

==== North Bačka District ====
Elections were held in all three municipalities in the North Bačka District. The For a European Serbia coalition won a plurality victory in Subotica and governed in a sometimes difficult coalition with the Hungarian Coalition, which won a majority victory in Bačka Topola and a strong plurality victory in Mali Iđoš.

===== Subotica =====
Results of the election for the Municipal Assembly of Subotica:

Party	Votes	%	Seats
"For a European Subotica–Boris Tadić"–DS–G17 Plus–DSHV–SDPS"	33,005	40.58	32
"Hungarian Coalition–István Pásztor"	22,300	27.42	21
"Serbian List for Subotica SRS, DSS–NS, SPS"	13,494	16.59	13
"Together for Vojvodina–Together for Subotica, Liberal Democratic Party, League of Social Democrats of Vojvodina"	3,904	4.80	–
"Together for a Better Subotica–Mirko Bajić" (People's Democratic Party of Vojvodina, Serbian Renewal Movement, Strength of Serbia Movement)	3,571	4.39	–
"Da Subotici Svane" (Ecological Green Party, League of Communists of Yugoslavia in Serbia)	1,869	2.30	–
"Bunjevac Party of Vojvodina–Branko Francišković"	1,110	1.36	1
"Hungarian Civic Alliance–Marton Robert"	801	0.98	–
"Democratic Union of Croats"	751	0.92	–
"Bunjevac Party"	521	0.64	–
Total	81,326	100.00	67
Valid votes	81,326	98.09	
Invalid/blank votes	1,581	1.91	
Total votes	82,907	100.00	
Registered voters/turnout	130,248	63.65	

Saša Vučinić of the Democratic Party was chosen as mayor after the election. The Hungarian Coalition participated in the city's coalition government. Relations between the governing parties were often difficult.

===== Bačka Topola =====
Results of the election for the Municipal Assembly of Bačka Topola:

Party	Votes	%	Seats
Hungarian Coalition–István Pásztor	9,247	47.32	22
Together for a European Municipality of Bačka Topola, Democratic Party–League of Social Democrats of Vojvodina	4,049	20.72	9
Serbian Radical Party–Tomislav Nikolić	3,123	15.98	7
List for Serbia: Democratic Party of Serbia DSS–Socialist Party of Serbia SPS	1,665	8.52	3
To Be Proud of Our Municipality, Liberal Democratic Party, Robert Đeri	790	4.04	–
G17 Plus–Bačka Topola–Mlađan Dinkić	667	3.41	–
Total	19,541	100.00	41
Valid votes	19,541	97.67	
Invalid/blank votes	466	2.33	
Total votes	20,007	100.00	
Registered voters/turnout	31,725	63.06	

Incumbent mayor Attila Bábi of the Hungarian Coalition was confirmed for another term in office after the election. Árpád Fremond appeared on the Hungarian Coalition list but was not given a local mandate.

===== Mali Iđoš =====
Results of the election for the Municipal Assembly of Mali Iđoš:

Party	Votes	%	Seats
Hungarian Coalition–István Pásztor	2,367	37.99	12
Democratic Party–Boris Tadić	1,453	23.32	7
Serbian Radical Party–Tomislav Nikolić	786	12.61	3
Socialist Party of Serbia	425	6.82	2
Citizens' Group: Farmers of the Municipality of Mali Iđoš–Bertok Lajoš	255	4.09	–
Montenegrin Party	248	3.98	1
G17 Plus–For a European Mali Iđoš With a Secure Future–Dr. Csordás Mihály	202	3.24	–
Together for Vojvodina–Nenad Čanak (League of Social Democrats of Vojvodina)	194	3.11	–
Democratic Party of Serbia–New Serbia–Vojislav Koštunica	168	2.70	–
Liberal Democratic Party–Čedomir Jovanović	133	2.13	–
Total	6,231	100.00	25
Valid votes	6,231	97.88	
Invalid/blank votes	135	2.12	
Total votes	6,366	100.00	
Registered voters/turnout	10,651	59.77	

Róbert Csóré of the Hungarian Coalition was chosen as mayor after the election.

==== North Banat District ====
Elections were held in all six municipalities of the North Banat District. The Radicals won a narrow victory in Kikinda, although they fell from power later in the year and were replaced by the Democratic Party. The Democrats also won in Ada, Čoka, and Novi Kneževac, while the Hungarian Coalition won in Kanjiža and Senta.

===== Kikinda =====
Results of the election for the Municipal Assembly of Kikinda:

Party	Votes	%	Seats
Serbian Radical Party–Tomislav Nikolić	13,086	39.15	17
"For a European Kikinda–Boris Tadić" (Democratic Party–G17 Plus–Serbian Renewal Movement)	10,818	32.36	14
Socialist Party of Serbia (SPS)–Party of United Pensioners of Serbia (PUPS)	2,312	6.92	3
Democratic Party of Serbia–Vojislav Koštunica List Holder Svetislav Vukmirica	1,972	5.90	2
Together for Vojvodina–League of Social Democrats of Vojvodina–Nenad Čanak	1,935	5.79	2
Liberal Democratic Party–Čedomir Jovanović	1,594	4.77	–
Hungarian Coalition–István Pásztor	1,539	4.60	1
Justice Movement Party–Dragomir Prodanov-Bača	173	0.52	–
Total	33,429	100.00	39
Valid votes	33,429	98.05	
Invalid/blank votes	665	1.95	
Total votes	34,094	100.00	
Registered voters/turnout	54,369	62.71	

Incumbent mayor Branislav Blažić of the Radical Party was initially confirmed for another term in office on 3 June 2008, leading a coalition that also included the Socialist Party and the Democratic Party of Serbia. Later in the year, Blažić left the Radicals to become a founding member of the Serbian Progressive Party, taking most of the local Radical organization with him. After doing this, he sent the offer of a coalition government to the Democratic Party; this was rejected. On 17 October 2008, the Democratic Party formed a new administration that included the Socialists, the Alliance of Vojvodina Hungarians, the League of Social Democrats, and the Serbian Renewal Movement. Jagoda Tolicki was chosen as mayor. Tolicki was in turn replaced by fellow Democratic Party member Ilija Vojinović on 17 June 2009.

Milenko Jovanov of the Democratic Party of Serbia served on the municipal council (i.e., the executive branch of the municipal government) from 3 June to 17 October 2008, during Blažić's administration.

===== Ada =====
Results of the election for the Municipal Assembly of Ada:

Party	Votes	%	Seats
"For a European Municipality–Democratic Party–Boris Tadić"	2,998	29.53	10
Hungarian Coalition–István Pásztor	2,703	26.63	9
With Knowledge and Experience for a Successful Municipality–Ürményi Ferenc-Feco (G17 Plus, Citizens' Group)	2,071	20.40	6
Serbian Radical Party–Tomislav Nikolić	632	6.23	2
Hungarian Civic Alliance–Tamás Sass	609	6.00	2
Citizens' Group: Molci–Za Mol i Adu Moholiak	383	3.77	–
Together *Geče-Dragin-Molnar-Kelemen* For Our Municipality	341	3.36	–
Together for Vojvodina–Nenad Čanak	293	2.89	–
Liberal Democratic Party–Čedomir Jovanović	122	1.20	–
Total	10,152	100.00	29
Valid votes	10,152	98.35	
Invalid/blank votes	170	1.65	
Total votes	10,322	100.00	
Registered voters/turnout	16,519	62.49	

Zoltán Bilicki of the Democratic Party was chosen as mayor after the election. József Tóbiás appeared in the second position on the Democratic Party's list and received a mandate.

===== Čoka =====
Results of the election for the Municipal Assembly of Čoka:

Party	Votes	%	Seats
Democratic Party	2,012	30.15	10
Hungarian Coalition	1,693	25.37	8
Serbian Radical Party	1,187	17.79	5
League of Social Democrats of Vojvodina	476	7.13	2
Citizens' Groups (two different lists)	424	6.35	–
Vojvodina's Party	282	4.23	–
Coalition: Democratic Party of Serbia–New Serbia–Socialist Party of Serbia–Movement of Veterans of Serbia	254	3.81	–
Political Party "G17 Plus"	220	3.30	–
Party of United Pensioners of Serbia	125	1.87	–
Total	6,673	100.00	25
Valid votes	6,673	96.44	
Invalid/blank votes	246	3.56	
Total votes	6,919	100.00	
Registered voters/turnout	10,576	65.42	

Incumbent mayor Predrag Mijić of the Democratic Party was confirmed for another term in office after the election. He resigned in 2011, after a ruling that he could not continue to hold a dual mandate as mayor and a member of the Assembly of Vojvodina. He was replaced by Emil Poljak, also a member of the Democratic Party. The Hungarian Coalition participated in the local government.

===== Kanjiža =====
Results of the election for the Municipal Assembly of Kanjiža:

Party	Votes	%	Seats
Hungarian Coalition–István Pásztor	7,913	52.27	19
"For a European Kanjiža–Democratic Party–Boris Tadić"	4,510	29.79	10
League of Social Democrats of Vojvodina–Nenad Čanak–Gergelj Horvat	697	4.60	–
United Serb List for the Municipality of Kanjiža–Darko Tarbuk (Serbian Radical Party, Democratic Party of Serbia, New Serbia, Socialist Party of Serbia, Strength of Serbia Movement)	541	3.57	–
Liberal Democratic Party–Purgel Attila	520	3.44	–
Action Instead of Words G17 Plus–Eržebet Šinković	384	2.54	–
Hungarian European Movement–Kanjiža Movement for Europe–Jovo Tomišić-Lujaš	366	2.42	–
Vojvodina's Party–Harmat Mikloš "Cineš"	207	1.37	–
Total	15,138	100.00	29
Valid votes	15,138	97.54	
Invalid/blank votes	381	2.46	
Total votes	15,519	100.00	
Registered voters/turnout	23,605	65.74	

Mihály Nyilas of the Alliance of Vojvodina Hungarians was chosen as mayor after the election.

===== Novi Kneževac =====
Results of the election for the Municipal Assembly of Novi Kneževac:

Party	Votes	%	Seats
Democratic Party–G17 Plus–League of Social Democrats of Vojvodina	1,793	28.13	10
Serbian Radical Party	1,482	23.25	8
Hungarian Coalition	1,163	18.25	7
New Serbia	481	7.55	2
Socialist Party of Serbia	410	6.43	2
Democratic Party of Serbia	388	6.09	2
Party of United Pensioners of Serbia	254	3.99	–
Citizens' Group	231	3.62	–
Liberal Democratic Party	171	2.68	–
Total	6,373	100.00	31
Valid votes	6,373	96.59	
Invalid/blank votes	225	3.41	
Total votes	6,598	100.00	
Registered voters/turnout	10,099	65.33	

Dragan Babić of the Democratic Party served as mayor after the election.

===== Senta =====
Results of the election for the Municipal Assembly of Senta:

Party	Votes	%	Seats
Hungarian Coalition–István Pásztor	4,444	33.40	12
Democratic Party–Boris Tadić	3,424	25.74	9
Hungarian Civic Alliance–László Rác Szabó	1,808	13.59	4
With Deeds and Not Words–G17 Plus–József Sándor	931	7.00	2
Together for Vojvodina–Nenad Čanak–League of Social Democrats of Vojvodina	786	5.91	2
Serb List for Senta–Bogoljub Redžić (Serbian Radical Party, Socialist Party of Serbia, New Serbia)	533	4.01	–
Vojvodina's Party–Ištvan Kajari	494	3.71	–
Party of United Pensioners of Serbia	486	3.65	–
Liberal Democratic Party–Čedomir Jovanović	398	2.99	–
Total	13,304	100.00	29

Zoltán Pék of the Alliance of Vojvodina Hungarians was chosen as mayor after the election. He remained in this role until February 2010, when shifting political alliances allowed the Democratic Party to form a new administration with Anikó Širková as mayor. Pék took a seat in the municipal assembly on 15 June 2010 and led the VMSZ delegation there for the next two years.

==== South Bačka District ====
Local elections were held in the one city (Novi Sad) and all eleven separate municipalities in the South Bačka District.

The City of Novi Sad comprises two municipalities (the City municipality of Novi Sad and Petrovaradin), although their powers are very limited relative to the city government. Unlike Belgrade, Niš, and Vranje, Novi Sad does not have directly elected municipal assemblies.

The Radical Party finished in first place in six municipalities, although the party's hold on power in these areas was not strong. The Radicals initially formed government in four of the six municipalities where they won the popular vote, but they soon lost power in all four, weakened by internal divisions and by the loss of the Socialist Party as a coalition partner. (The Radicals returned to power in Bačka Palanka in 2010 and remained in office there until 2012. They have not led a local government in the district since that time.)

By the end of 2008, members of the Democratic Party held the mayoralties in Novi Sad and eight other jurisdictions. Representatives of different parties in the Hungarian Coalition claimed the mayoralties in Bečej and Temerin, and an independent list broadly aligned with the Democratic Party won the election in Srbobran.

===== Novi Sad =====
Results of the election for the City Assembly of Novi Sad:

Party	Votes	%	Seats
"For a European Novi Sad–Boris Tadić" (Democratic Party, G17 Plus)	58,302	33.23	30
Serbian Radical Party–Tomislav Nikolić	49,161	28.02	26
Together for Vojvodina–Nenad Čanak	17,081	9.74	9
Citizens' Group: "Maja Gojković"	13,494	7.69	7
Democratic Party of Serbia–New Serbia–Vojislav Koštunica	10,771	6.14	5
Socialist Party of Serbia (SPS)–Party of United Pensioners of Serbia (PUPS)	8,267	4.71	–
Liberal Democratic Party–Čedomir Jovanović	5,612	3.20	–
"United Pensioners and Social Justice"	5,311	3.03	–
Hungarian Coalition–István Pásztor	2,512	1.43	1
Urban Movement	1,118	0.64	–
Ecological Movement–Movement for Novi Sad–Green Coalition–Nikola Aleksić	1,089	0.62	–
People's Movement for Novi Sad Rada Marinkov	1,085	0.62	–
Novi Sad Party–Aleksandar Odžić	731	0.42	–
"European Power of Vojvodina–Prosperity"–Miroslav Mrnuštik-Mikica	410	0.23	–
Crisis Staff–Five to Twelve	287	0.16	–
Vojvodina Is the Strength of Serbia (Roma Party, Roma Renewal Movement)	199	0.11	–
Total	175,430	100.00	78
Valid votes	175,430	98.35	
Invalid/blank votes	2,948	1.65	
Total votes	178,378	100.00	
Registered voters/turnout	294,163	60.64	

Igor Pavličić of the Democratic Party was chosen as mayor after the election, with the support of forty-one delegates. The Hungarian Coalition and the Socialist Party participated in the governing coalition (with the latter party serving on the city's executive, even though it did not win any seats in the assembly).

Former mayor Milorad Mirčić appeared in the second position on the Radical list, although he did not take a mandate afterward. Future parliamentarian Nada Lazić, a member of the League of Social Democrats of Vojvodina, appeared in the thirty-fifth position on the Together for Vojvodina list and also did not receive a mandate.

===== Bač =====
Results of the election for the Municipal Assembly of Bač:

Party	Votes	%	Seats
Democratic Party	3,931	45.46	13
Serbian Radical Party	2,406	27.82	8
Socialist Party of Serbia–Party of United Pensioners of Serbia	751	8.68	2
Democratic Party of Serbia	664	7.68	2
Liberal Democratic Party	323	3.73	–
League of Social Democrats of Vojvodina–Vojvodina's Party	275	3.18	–
Alliance for the Municipality of Bač	160	1.85	–
Roma Union of Serbia–New Serbia	138	1.60	–
Total	8,648	100.00	25
Valid votes	8,648	96.65	
Invalid/blank votes	300	3.35	
Total votes	8,948	100.00	
Registered voters/turnout	13,530	66.13	

Incumbent mayor Tomislav Bogunović of the Democratic Party was confirmed for another term in office after the election.

===== Bačka Palanka =====
Results of the election for the Municipal Assembly of Bačka Palanka:

Party	Votes	%	Seats
Serbian Radical Party–Tomislav Nikolić	10,937	37.18	18
"For a European Serbia–Boris Tadić" (Democratic Party) and G17 Plus)	9,613	32.68	16
Socialist Party of Serbia–Party of United Pensioners of Serbia–Strength of Serbia Movement	2,947	10.02	4
Democratic Party of Serbia–New Serbia–Vojislav Koštunica	2,256	7.67	3
Together for Vojvodina–Nenad Čanak–Prim. Dr. Milan C. Mirković (League of Social Democrats of Vojvodina, Serbian Renewal Movement)	1,133	3.85	–
Liberal Democratic Party–Čedomir Jovanović	903	3.07	–
Slovak National Party	753	2.56	1
Roma Party–Srđan Šajn (Roma Party, Roma Renewal Movement)	506	1.72	–
New Radical Party	367	1.25	–
Total	29,415	100.00	42
Valid votes	29,415	97.80	
Invalid/blank votes	661	2.20	
Total votes	30,076	100.00	
Registered voters/turnout	49,193	61.14	

Incumbent mayor Dragan Bozalo of the Radical Party was confirmed for another term in office on 3 June 2008, following a coalition agreement between the Radicals, the Socialists, and the Democratic Party of Serbia (DSS). The Democratic Party (DS) subsequently formed a new multi-party coalition including the Socialist Party and the DSS, and on 3 November 2008 DS member Kosta Stakić became mayor. In April 2010, the Radicals formed a new coalition with the DSS (following the defection of a For a European Serbia delegate), and Bozalo returned to office again.

===== Bački Petrovac =====
Results of the election for the Municipal Assembly of Bački Petrovac:

Party	Votes	%	Seats
"For a European Serbia–Boris Tadić" (Democratic Party)	2,228	29.08	11
"For an Environment Worth Living In–G17 Plus Dr. Jan Sabo"	1,963	25.62	9
"Together for Vojvodina–Nenad Čanak" (League of Social Democrats of Vojvodina)	985	12.86	4
"S R S–Tomislav Nikolić", Miloš Jojić	842	10.99	4
"L D P–Čedomir Jovanović"	532	6.94	2
"Socialist Party of Serbia–New Serbia–P U P S", Rajko Perić	348	4.54	–
"Slovak National Party", Juraj Červenak	238	3.11	1
Citizens' Group: "Citizens' Initiative", Jan Kolar	212	2.77	–
"Democratic Party of Serbia", Vladimir Stančić	152	1.98	–
"Strength of Serbia Movement–Bogoljub Karić", Tatjana Ivić	107	1.40	–
"Vojvodina's Party", Pavel Danko	55	0.72	–
Total	7,662	100.00	31
Valid votes	7,662	97.88	
Invalid/blank votes	166	2.12	
Total votes	7,828	100.00	
Registered voters/turnout	12,321	63.53	

Ondrej Benka of the Democratic Party was initially chosen as mayor after the election. He resigned in October 2008 and was replaced by Vladimir Turan of the same party.

===== Bečej =====
Results of the election for the Municipal Assembly of Bečej:

Party	Votes	%	Seats
Hungarian Coalition–István Pásztor	6,366	30.28	13
"Movement for Bečej"–Dušan Jovanović	3,859	18.36	8
For a European Municipality of Bečej–Boris Tadić (Democratic Party, G17 Plus, League of Social Democrats of Vojvodina)	3,646	17.34	7
Serbian Accord for Bečej–Serbian Radical Party–Democratic Party of Serbia–New Serbia–Dragan Živkov Džaja	3,236	15.39	6
"As One House"	1,128	5.37	2
"List for Our Municipality"–Coalition: Party of United Pensioners of Serbia (PUPS) Bečej and Citizens' Group: "Successful People" Bečej–Milovanov Živko-Braca	756	3.60	–
Liberal Democratic Party–"Old Bečej–New People"–Čedomir Jovanović	732	3.48	–
Movement for a U-Turn–Jovan Ječanski Jole	673	3.20	–
Socialist Party of Serbia–Dr. Zora Alić	627	2.98	–
Total	21,023	100.00	36
Valid votes	21,023	97.84	
Invalid/blank votes	464	2.16	
Total votes	21,487	100.00	
Registered voters/turnout	34,631	62.05	

Peter Knezi of the Alliance of Vojvodina Hungarians was chosen as mayor after the election.

===== Beočin =====
Results of the election for the Municipal Assembly of Beočin:

Party	Votes	%	Seats
Serbian Radical Party	1,748	19.89	9
Democratic Party	1,738	19.78	8
Democratic Party of Serbia	830	9.44	4
G17 Plus	799	9.09	4
Citizens' Groups (three different lists, including Goran Kalabić)	752	8.56	2
Socialist Party of Serbia–Party of United Pensioners of Serbia	698	7.94	3
League of Social Democrats of Vojvodina	669	7.61	3
Movement for the Development of the Municipality of Beočin	405	4.61	–
New Democratic Party of Roma in Serbia	270	3.07	1
Roma Party (Romska stranka)	204	2.32	1
Roma Party (Romska partija)	180	2.05	–
Slovak National Party	177	2.01	–
Liberal Democratic Party	163	1.85	–
New Serbia–Serbian Renewal Movement	155	1.76	–
Total	8,788	100.00	35
Valid votes	8,788	96.83	
Invalid/blank votes	288	3.17	
Total votes	9,076	100.00	
Registered voters/turnout	12,941	70.13	

Incumbent mayor Zoran Tešić of the Radical Party was initially confirmed for a new term in office in June 2008, with an assembly majority that also included the Socialists, the Democratic Party of Serbia, the Party of United Pensioners of Serbia, the Goran Kalabić list, and the New Democratic Party of Roma in Serbia. Two months later, a realignment of political forces in the community led to Bogdan Cvejić of the Democratic Party replacing Tešić as mayor. Cvejić's administration was supported by G17 Plus, the League of Social Democrats, the Socialist Party of Serbia, and the Party of United Pensioners of Serbia.

===== Srbobran =====
Results of the election for the Municipal Assembly of Srbobran:

Party	Votes	%	Seats
Citizens' Group: Branko Gajin	3,182	36.55	13
Serbian Radical Party–Tomislav Nikolić	1,983	22.78	8
Hungarian Coalition–István Pásztor	679	7.80	2
Together for Vojvodina (LSV and SPO)–Milan Trifunović	649	7.45	2
Citizens' Group: For a Better Srbobran, Turija, and Nadalj–Dušan Mihajlović	574	6.59	2
Democratic Party–Boris Tadić	485	5.57	1
Socialist Party of Serbia–Nestor Neca Golubski	336	3.86	–
Citizens' Group: Count on Us Too–Fenjveši Ištvan	282	3.24	–
As One House–We Love Our Village	215	2.47	–
Liberal Democratic Party	196	2.25	–
Democratic Party of Serbia–New Serbia–Vojislav Koštunica	125	1.44	–
Total	8,706	100.00	28
Valid votes	8,706	97.24	
Invalid/blank votes	247	2.76	
Total votes	8,953	100.00	
Registered voters/turnout	14,115	63.43	

Incumbent mayor Branko Gajin was confirmed for another term in office after the election. The municipal government was formed by Gajin's list, the Hungarian Coalition, and the Democratic Party.

===== Sremski Karlovci =====
Results of the election for the Municipal Assembly of Sremski Karlovci:

Party	Votes	%	Seats
For a European Karlovci–Boris Tadić (Democratic Party and G17 Plus)	2,360	49.36	15
Serbian Radical Party	1,098	22.97	6
Citizens' Groups (two different lists)	548	11.46	2
Socialist Party of Serbia–Party of United Pensioners of Serbia	293	6.13	1
Democratic Party of Serbia	254	5.31	1
League of Social Democrats of Vojvodina–Serbian Renewal Movement	228	4.77	–
Total	4,781	100.00	25
Valid votes	4,781	98.37	
Invalid/blank votes	79	1.63	
Total votes	4,860	100.00	
Registered voters/turnout	8,185	59.38	

Incumbent mayor Milenko Filipović of G17 Plus (a part of the For a European Serbia alliance) was confirmed for another term in office after the election. He later joined the Democratic Party.

===== Temerin =====
Results of the election for the Municipal Assembly of Temerin:

Party	Votes	%	Seats
Serbian Radical Party–Tomislav Nikolić	4,578	28.84	11
Hungarian Coalition–István Pásztor	3,540	22.30	8
Democratic Party–Boris Tadić	2,784	17.54	6
Socialist Party of Serbia–Zoran Svitić	1,009	6.36	2
Democratic Party of Serbia, New Serbia–Vojislav Koštunica	845	5.32	2
PSS–Bogoljub Karić–PUPS	834	5.25	2
Citizens' Group: For the Prosperity of the Municipality of Temerin	816	5.14	2
Citizens' Group: Čedo Dakić	441	2.78	–
G17 Plus–SPO–LDP	305	1.92	–
Citizens' Group: Together for Sirig	288	1.81	–
Citizens' Group: Good Neighbour–Nedeljko Đukić	267	1.68	–
Citizens' Group: Citizens' Group: Franja Šmit	169	1.06	–
Total	15,876	100.00	33
Valid votes	15,876	97.95	
Invalid/blank votes	332	2.05	
Total votes	16,208	100.00	
Registered voters/turnout	23,727	68.31	

Gustonj Andraš of the Democratic Party of Vojvodina Hungarians (a part of the Hungarian Coalition) was chosen as mayor after the election.

===== Titel =====
Results of the election for the Municipal Assembly of Titel:

Party	Votes	%	Seats
Serbian Radical Party–Tomislav Nikolić	3,117	36.66	11
"For a European Serbia–Boris Tadić" (Democratic Party)	2,561	30.12	9
Socialist Party of Serbia (SPS)–Party of United Pensioners of Serbia (PUPS)	627	7.37	2
Citizens' Group: With All Our Hearts for the Municipality of Titel–Stevan Marjanov-Pesak	498	5.86	1
Democratic Party of Serbia–Vojislav Koštunica	461	5.42	1
Citizens' Group: "For Our Village"–Zdenko Babić-Zena	450	5.29	1
"Together for Vojvodina" G17 Plus, SPO, LSV	221	2.60	–
"Šajkaška List"	203	2.39	–
New Serbia	168	1.98	–
LDP–Čedomir Jovanović (LDP–European Vojvodina–SDU)	154	1.81	–
Citizens' Group: "Banika Stevo"	43	0.51	–
Total	8,503	100.00	25
Valid votes	8,503	97.47	
Invalid/blank votes	221	2.53	
Total votes	8,724	100.00	
Registered voters/turnout	12,646	68.99	

Incumbent mayor Milivoj Petrović of the Democratic Party was confirmed for another term in office after the election. The local administration was supported by the Democratic Party, the Socialist Party, and the two independent assembly members.

===== Vrbas =====
Results of the election for the Municipal Assembly of Vrbas:

Party	Votes	%	Seats
Serbian Radical Party–Tomislav Nikolić	8,491	38.07	16
"For a European Vrbas–Boris Tadić" (Democratic Party, G17 Plus, Serbian Renewal Movement, Social Democratic Party)	7,021	31.48	13
Socialist Party of Serbia (SPS)–Party of United Pensioners of Serbia (PUPS)	2,231	10.00	4
Democratic Party of Serbia–Vojislav Koštunica	1,676	7.51	3
Liberal Democratic Party–Čedomir Jovanović	1,064	4.77	–
New Serbia–Velimir Ilić	768	3.44	–
Together for Vojvodina–Nenad Čanak	691	3.10	–
Sloboda–Socialists for a Free Serbia (Socialist Freedom Party, Strength of Serbia Movement)	361	1.62	–
Total	22,303	100.00	36
Valid votes	22,303	97.67	
Invalid/blank votes	531	2.33	
Total votes	22,834	100.00	
Registered voters/turnout	36,896	61.89	

Incumbent mayor Željko Lainović of the Radical Party was confirmed for another term in office after the election. The assembly majority comprised the Radicals, the Socialists, and the Democratic Party of Serbia. The Socialists subsequently withdrew their support from the government, leading to new elections in 2009.

===== Žabalj =====
Results of the election for the Municipal Assembly of Žabalj:

Party	Votes	%	Seats
Serbian Radical Party–Tomislav Nikolić	4,289	38.96	14
Democratic Party–Boris Tadić	3,172	28.81	10
DSS–NS–SPO–Miodrag Janjoš	1,052	9.55	3
Socialist Party of Serbia–Party of United Pensioners of Serbia	740	6.72	2
Citizens' Group: With Heart, Knowledge, and Honesty for a More Successful Municipality – For a More Beautiful Village–Dragan Milovanović	628	5.70	2
Strength of Serbia Movement–Bogoljub Karić	560	5.09	–
G17 Plus–Zoran Jakšić	226	2.05	–
People's Movement for Žabalj (People's Party, We Are Reformists Social Democratic Party)	172	1.56	–
Roma Party–Srđan Šajn	171	1.55	–
Total	11,010	100.00	31
Valid votes	11,010	96.38	
Invalid/blank votes	414	3.62	
Total votes	11,424	100.00	
Registered voters/turnout	21,635	52.80	

Dragiša Đorđević of the Radical Party was chosen as mayor after the election, in a coalition with the alliances around the Socialist Party and the Democratic Party of Serbia. In November 2008, both of these groups left the Radicals and formed a new coalition led by the Democratic Party, with Branko Stajić as mayor.

==== Srem District ====
Local elections were held in the one city (Sremska Mitrovica) and all six other municipalities of the Srem District. The Democratic Party won the popular vote in Sremska Mitrovica; although the Democratic Party of Serbia and Serbian Radical Party briefly formed a local administration, a new alliance of the Democratic Party and Democratic Party of Serbia came to power shortly thereafter. Branislav Nedimović of the Democratic Party of Serbia served as mayor.

The Democratic Party won the elections in Inđija, Pećinci, and Sid, and in each case led a coalition government afterward. The Democratic Party and Serbian Radical Party won the same number of seats in both Stara Pazova and Ruma; the Democratic Party formed government in the first of these municipalities, and a new election (which was won by the Democratic Party) took place in the second.

The Serbian Radical Party won the election in Irig but did not form government. An independent mayor initially led a coalition government; in 2009, he was replaced by a member of the Democratic Party.

===== Sremska Mitrovica =====
Results of the election for the Municipal Assembly of Sremska Mitrovica:

Party	Votes	%	Seats
Democratic Party–Boris Tadić	14,311	31.80	22
Serbian Radical Party–Tomislav Nikolić	12,732	28.29	20
Democratic Party of Serbia–Vojislav Koštunica	10,748	23.88	16
G17 Plus and League of Social Democrats of Vojvodina–Mlađan Dinkić–Nenad Čanak	2,536	5.64	3
Liberal Democratic Party–Čedomir Jovanović	1,599	3.55	–
Socialist Party of Serbia–Party of United Pensioners of Serbia–Strength of Serbia Movement	1,552	3.45	–
Socialist People's Party–Citizens' Group: Community of Serbs of Croatia and Bosnia and Herzegovina	645	1.43	–
Srem Party	324	0.72	–
Citizens' Group: Pensioners	278	0.62	–
Citizens' Group: For - Mitrovica - Yes	275	0.61	–
Total	45,000	100.00	61
Valid votes	45,000	96.52	
Invalid/blank votes	1,621	3.48	
Total votes	46,621	100.00	
Registered voters/turnout	69,513	67.07	

The local government was initially formed by the Democratic Party of Serbia and the Serbian Radical Party. Branislav Nedimović of the Democratic Party of Serbia was chosen as mayor. Later in 2008, the Democratic Party of Serbia formed a new alliance with the Democratic Party, with Nedimović continuing in office.

Nedimović resigned from the Democratic Party of Serbia in March 2010 and joined the breakaway Mitrovica European Region movement. He sought to join the Democratic Party later in the year, although he was not accepted by the party's city committee. After this, he formed his own group called Valuable Mitrovica. He continued to serve as mayor throughout the 2008–12 term.

===== Inđija =====
Results of the election for the Municipal Assembly of Inđija:

Party	Votes	%	Seats
Goran Ješić–DS	12,093	46.31	18
Serbian Radical Party–Tomislav Nikolić	6,571	25.16	10
List for Inđija and Progressive Villages (Movement for Vojvodina–Union of Farmers of Serbia)	2,399	9.19	3
Socialist Party of Serbia–Čuro Kalinić	2,105	8.06	3
Democratic Party of Serbia–Vojislav Koštunica–Milan Predojević	2,049	7.85	3
Movement of Veterans of Serbia	322	1.23	–
Party of United Pensioners of Serbia	316	1.21	–
Liberal Democratic Party	259	0.99	–
Total	26,114	100.00	37
Valid votes	26,114	98.17	
Invalid/blank votes	486	1.83	
Total votes	26,600	100.00	
Registered voters/turnout	40,828	65.15	

Incumbent mayor Goran Ješić of the Democratic Party was confirmed for another term in office after the election, leading a governing coalition that also included the Socialist Party of Serbia.

===== Irig =====
Results of the election for the Municipal Assembly of Irig:

Party	Votes	%	Seats
Serbian Radical Party	1,673	28.38	8
Citizens' Groups (three different lists)	1,233	20.92	4
Democratic Party and G17 Plus	1,017	17.25	4
League of Social Democrats of Vojvodina	760	12.89	3
Socialist Party of Serbia	409	6.94	1
Democratic Party of Serbia	301	5.11	–
Liberal Democratic Party	190	3.22	–
Hungarian Coalition	160	2.71	–
Srem Party	152	2.58	–
Total	5,895	100.00	20
Valid votes	5,895	97.15	
Invalid/blank votes	173	2.85	
Total votes	6,068	100.00	
Registered voters/turnout	9,444	64.25	

Incumbent mayor Radovan Ercegovac, who had been elected on an independent list, was confirmed for another term in office after the election. All lists except the Radicals supported his administration. Ercegovac resigned in October 2009 and was replaced the following month by Vladimir Petrović of the Democratic Party.

===== Pečinci =====
Results of the election for the Municipal Assembly of Pećinci:

Party	Votes	%	Seats
Democratic Party	3,635	32.83	12
Serbian Radical Party	2,862	25.85	9
Citizens' Groups (three different lists)	1,832	16.54	3
Democratic Party of Serbia–New Serbia–Socialist Party of Serbia	876	7.91	3
G17 Plus	849	7.67	2
Liberal Democratic Party	476	4.30	–
Party of United Pensioners of Serbia	387	3.49	–
Roma Party	156	1.41	–
Total	11,073	100.00	29
Valid votes	11,073	96.75	
Invalid/blank votes	372	3.25	
Total votes	11,445	100.00	
Registered voters/turnout	15,884	72.05	

Siniša Vukov of the Democratic Party was chosen as mayor after the election, leading a coalition that also included G17 Plus.

===== Ruma =====
A provisional administration was introduced in Ruma in March 2008, following a period in which two rival administrations (respectively led by the Democratic Party and the Serbian Radical Party) claimed to be the legitimate government of the community. The leader of the provisional administration was Nenad Borović of the Democratic Party. Srđan Nikolić of the Radicals remained in office as mayor during this time.

The 2008 local elections did not produce a clear winner:

Party	Seats
Democratic Party	18
Serbian Radical Party	18
Democratic Party of Serbia	4
Socialist Party of Serbia–Party of United Pensioners of Serbia	3
Total	43
Source: Only parties that won seats are listed

In June 2008, local Serbian Radical Party leader Aleksandar Martinović and local Democratic Party of Serbia leader Dragan Božić announced a new coalition that would have held a one-seat majority in the local assembly. The coalition never came to power; one Radical delegate mysteriously left the area, and the Democratic Party of Serbia later withdrew from the coalition. The Democratic Party's attempts to form a new coalition with the Democratic Party of Serbia and the Socialist Party of Serbia also failed. Another provisional authority, also led by Borović, was appointed in August 2008 pending a repeat election in November.

The repeat election was held on 9 November 2008:

Party	Votes	%	Seats
For a European Ruma–Boris Tadić (Democratic Party, G17 Plus, League of Social Democrats of Vojvodina, Serbian Renewal Movement)	9,462	43.80	20
Citizens' Group: Forward Serbia–Tomislav Nikolić	3,901	18.06	8
Coalition: Dragan Božić–Democratic Party of Serbia–New Serbia	2,850	13.19	6
Serbian Radical Party–Dr. Vojislav Šešelj	1,818	8.42	4
Coalition: SPS–PUPS	1,377	6.37	3
Coalition for the Municipality of Ruma LDP–United Peasant Party–Citizens' Group: Živko Matijević	1,232	5.70	2
Movement of Veterans of Serbia	560	2.59	–
Srem Party	402	1.86	–
Total	21,602	100.00	43

Goran Vuković of the Democratic Party was chosen as mayor in December 2008.

Aleksandar Martinović led the Radical Party's group in the assembly following the election.

===== Šid =====
Results of the election for the Municipal Assembly of Šid:

Party	Votes	%	Seats
For a European Serbia–Boris Tadić (Democratic Party, G17 Plus)	7,624	40.54	18
Serbian Radical Party	5,697	30.29	13
Democratic Party of Serbia	2,249	11.96	5
Coalition: Socialist Party of Serbia–Party of United Pensioners of Serbia	1,466	7.79	3
Together for Vojvodina–Nenad Čanak	909	4.83	–
LDP–Čedomir Jovanović	525	2.79	–
Citizens' Group: With the Truth for a Better Life	337	1.79	–
Total	18,807	100.00	39
Valid votes	18,807	97.77	
Invalid/blank votes	429	2.23	
Total votes	19,236	100.00	
Registered voters/turnout	31,337	61.38	

Milenko Dabić of the Democratic Party was chosen as mayor after the election. The local administration was supported by For a European Serbia, the Democratic Party of Serbia, and the Socialist Party of Serbia. Dabić was replaced by Nataša Cvjetković in March 2009.

===== Stara Pazova =====
Results of the election for the Municipal Assembly of Stara Pazova:

Party	Votes	%	Seats
Serbian Radical Party	11,169	35.07	20
For a European Serbia–Boris Tadić (Democratic Party, G17 Plus)	10,766	33.80	20
Citizens' Groups (two different lists)	3,974	12.48	4
Democratic Party of Serbia	2,261	7.10	4
Coalition: Socialist Party of Serbia–Party of United Pensioners of Serbia	1,582	4.97	–
Coalition: League of Social Democrats of Vojvodina–Vojvodina's Party	865	2.72	–
New Serbia	413	1.30	–
Coalition: Socialist Freedom Party–Strength of Serbia Movement	322	1.01	–
Movement of Veterans of Serbia	293	0.92	–
Roma Party of Unification	205	0.64	–
Total	31,850	100.00	48
Valid votes	31,850	97.72	
Invalid/blank votes	744	2.28	
Total votes	32,594	100.00	
Registered voters/turnout	52,667	61.89	

Goran Jović of the Democratic Party was chosen as mayor after the election.

==== West Bačka District ====
Local elections were held in the one city (Sombor) and all three other municipalities of the West Bačka District. The Democratic Party won and formed government in Sombor and Kula, longtime Socialist Party of Serbia mayor Živorad Smiljanić led his party to another victory in Apatin, and the Serbian Radical Party formed an unstable government in Odžaci. The local administration in Odžaci fell in 2009, and a new election was held the following year.

===== Sombor =====
Results of the election for the City Assembly of Sombor:

Party	Votes	%	Seats
Democratic Party–Boris Tadić	17,723	38.19	26
Serbian Radical Party–Tomislav Nikolić	15,486	33.37	23
Democratic Party of Serbia–Vojislav Koštunica	3,289	7.09	5
Hungarian Coalition–István Pásztor	3,027	6.52	4
"Let's Get Sombor Working Together" G17 Plus, SPO, LSV–Mlađan Dinkić	2,524	5.44	3
Liberal Democratic Party–Čedomir Jovanović	1,530	3.30	–
Coalition: "For the Sombor I Want!"–SPS, PUPS, NS, PSS	1,480	3.19	–
Citizen's Group: The Reply Rajko Miranović	1,348	2.90	–
Total	46,407	100.00	61
Valid votes	46,407	98.22	
Invalid/blank votes	840	1.78	
Total votes	47,247	100.00	
Registered voters/turnout	79,165	59.68	

Dušan Jović, at the time a member of the Democratic Party, was chosen as mayor after the election. He was replaced by Nemanja Delić of the same party in November 2009.

SPO member Žika Gojković was one of the three members elected on the Let's Get Sombor Working Together list. He was also elected to the national assembly, and he resigned his seat in the local parliament on 4 July 2008.

Zlata Đerić of New Serbia appeared in the third position on the "For the Sombor I Want!" list.

===== Apatin =====
Results of the election for the Municipal Assembly of Apatin:

Party	Votes	%	Seats
Dr. Živorad Smiljanić–SPS, PUPS	5,221	32.98	11
Serbian Radical Party	3,985	25.17	8
For a European Apatin–Boris Tadić (Democratic Party, G17 Plus)	2,797	17.67	5
Citizen's Groups (two different lists)	1,829	11.55	3
Hungarian Coalition–Democratic Union of Croats	1,272	8.03	2
League of Social Democrats of Vojvodina	486	3.07	–
Coalition: LDP–SPO	242	1.53	–
Total	15,832	100.00	29
Valid votes	15,832	97.58	
Invalid/blank votes	392	2.42	
Total votes	16,224	100.00	
Registered voters/turnout	27,512	58.97	

Incumbent mayor Živorad Smiljanić of the Socialist Party was confirmed for another term in office after the election.

===== Kula =====
Results of the election for the Municipal Assembly of Kula:

Party	Votes	%	Seats
Democratic Party–Boris Tadić	8,427	35.66	16
Serbian Radical Party–Tomislav Nikolić	7,600	32.16	15
Democratic Party of Serbia–New Serbia–Vojislav Koštunica	1,689	7.15	3
Green Party (Stranka Zelenih)–Hercen Radonjić Keka	1,431	6.06	2
Socialist Party of Serbia (SPS)–Party of United Pensioners of Serbia (PUPS)–Dušan Bajatović	1,175	4.97	–
Liberal Democratic Party–Čedomir Jovanović	989	4.19	–
Hungarian Coalition Pásztor István	809	3.42	1
Together for Vojvodina–Nenad Čanak	704	2.98	–
G17 Plus–Mlađan Dinkić	537	2.27	–
Freedom-Socialists for a Free Serbia (Socialist Freedom Party and Yugoslavian Communists)	163	0.69	–
Vojvodina's Party	108	0.46	–
Total	23,632	100.00	37
Valid votes	23,632	98.50	
Invalid/blank votes	360	1.50	
Total votes	23,992	100.00	
Registered voters/turnout	38,226	62.76	

Incumbent mayor Svetozar Bukvić on the Democratic Party was confirmed for another term in office after the election. He left office in December 2011 when the Serbian government dissolved the local administration and set up a temporary authority led by Željko Kovač, also of the Democratic Party.

===== Odžaci =====
Results of the election for the Municipal Assembly of Odžaci:

Party	Votes	%	Seats
Serbian Radical Party	6,643	40.74	13
For a European Odžaci (Democratic Party, G17 Plus)	4,601	28.21	9
Democratic Party of Serbia	1,601	9.82	3
Socialist Party of Serbia–Party of United Pensioners of Serbia	1,599	9.81	3
Liberal Democratic Party–Christian Democratic Party of Serbia	481	2.95	–
Hungarian Coalition	425	2.61	–
Citizens' Group	400	2.45	–
New Serbia	315	1.93	–
League of Social Democrats of Vojvodina–Serbian Renewal Movement	242	1.48	–
Total	16,307	100.00	28
Valid votes	16,307	98.12	
Invalid/blank votes	312	1.88	
Total votes	16,619	100.00	
Registered voters/turnout	28,329	58.66	

Incumbent mayor Milan Ćuk of the Radical Party was confirmed for another term in office after the election. The government proved to be unstable, and the municipal assembly became dysfunctional in 2009 after the Socialists withdrew their support from Ćuk's administration. The government of Serbia removed Ćuk as mayor in August 2009 and set up a temporary authority with Veroljub Marković of the Democratic Party as its leader. A new election was held in the municipality on 24 January 2010.

=== Central Serbia (excluding Belgrade) ===
==== Mačva District ====
Local elections were held in both cities (i.e., Šabac and Loznica) and all six municipalities of the Mačva District.

In Šabac, the Democratic Party won the election and afterward led a local coalition government. In Loznica, G17 Plus did the same thing.

The Serbian Radical Party won the elections in Bogatić, Krupanj, Mali Zvornik, and Vladimirci. In Bogatić and Vladmirci, the Radicals initially governed in a coalition with the Socialist Party of Serbia and other parties; in both cases, a new coalition led by the Democratic Party came to power in 2010. In Mali Zvornik, the Radicals were only briefly in power before being replaced by a Democratic-led administration. In Krupanj, a delegate from New Serbia served as mayor in a coalition administration.

The Socialist Party won the election in Ljubovija; the Democratic Party initially formed a coalition government, which the Socialists joined in 2009. Veroljub Matić's list won the election in Koceljeva and led a coalition government afterward.

===== Šabac =====
Results of the election for the City Assembly of Šabac:

Party	Votes	%	Seats
Democratic Party–Boris Tadić	24,621	38.08	28
Serbian Radical Party–Tomislav Nikolić	17,907	27.69	21
Democratic Party of Serbia–New Serbia–Vojislav Koštunica	6,572	10.16	7
SPS–Party of United Pensioners of Serbia	4,489	6.94	5
G17 Plus Šabac–Mlađan Dinkić	3,536	5.47	4
SPO–LDP–Association of Citizens "SELAM"–Živojin Vuletić–Milan Čičulić	3,507	5.42	4
NSS–Farmers' Union of Serbia–Slobodan Lj. Nikolić	2,236	3.46	–
Peasant Workers' Party–Stanković Dragan	1,257	1.94	–
SDP–Rasim Ljajić–Began Cicvarić	310	0.48	–
Roma Party–Roma Renewal Movement	229	0.35	–
Total	64,664	100.00	69
Valid votes	64,664	97.56	
Invalid/blank votes	1,619	2.44	
Total votes	66,283	100.00	
Registered voters/turnout	104,739	63.28	

Incumbent mayor Miloš Milošević of the Democratic Party was confirmed for another term in office after the election.

===== Bogatić =====
Results of the election for the Municipal Assembly of Bogatić:

Party	Votes	%	Seats
Serbian Radical Party	3,911	24.55	9
Socialist Party of Serbia-Party of United Pensioners of Serbia	2,587	16.24	6
Democratic Party	2,569	16.12	5
New Serbia	1,999	12.55	4
G17 Plus	1,465	9.20	3
Serbian Renewal Movement-Christian Democratic Party of Serbia	900	5.65	2
Democratic Party of Serbia	897	5.63	2
Citizens' Group	582	3.65	–
Liberal Democratic Party	527	3.31	–
Peasant Workers' Party	343	2.15	–
Strength of Serbia Movement–Bogoljub Karić	152	0.95	–
Total	15,932	100.00	31
Valid votes	15,932	97.47	
Invalid/blank votes	414	2.53	
Total votes	16,346	100.00	
Registered voters/turnout	26,091	62.65	

The Serbian Radical Party, Socialist Party of Serbia, and Democratic Party of Serbia formed a coalition government after the election, with incumbent Radenko Petrić of the Socialists chosen as mayor and Dragan Aćimović of the Radicals as deputy mayor. In August 2010, a new governing coalition came to power with the Democratic Party, G17 Plus, the Serbian Renewal Movement, and New Serbia, along with three former Radical Party delegates; Slobodan Savić of the Democratic Party was chosen as mayor.

===== Koceljeva =====
Results of the election for the Municipal Assembly of Koceljeva:

Party	Votes	%	Seats
Citizens' Groups (three different lists)	2,319	30.86	10
Serbian Radical Party	1,172	15.60	6
Democratic Party–G17 Plus	1,144	15.22	5
Democratic Party of Serbia	1,112	14.80	5
Socialist Party of Serbia-Party of United Pensioners of Serbia	969	12.90	4
New Serbia–Serbian Renewal Movement	372	4.95	–
New Democratic Party of Roma in Serbia	288	3.83	1
Strength of Serbia Movement–Bogoljub Karić	103	1.37	–
Yugoslav Communists and Citizens' Group	35	0.47	–
Total	7,514	100.00	31
Valid votes	7,514	96.43	
Invalid/blank votes	278	3.57	
Total votes	7,792	100.00	
Registered voters/turnout	12,556	62.06	

Incumbent mayor Veroljub Matić, who was elected on an independent list, was confirmed for another term in office after the election.

===== Krupanj =====
Results of the election for the Municipal Assembly of Krupanj:

Party	Votes	%	Seats
Serbian Radical Party	2,111	23.19	9
Democratic Party of Serbia	1,547	16.99	7
Citizens' Groups (three different lists)	1,463	16.07	5
Democratic Party	1,088	11.95	4
Socialist Party of Serbia-Party of United Pensioners of Serbia	971	10.67	4
New Serbia	917	10.07	4
G17 Plus	543	5.97	2
Christian Democratic Party of Serbia	463	5.09	–
Total	9,103	100.00	35
Valid votes	9,103	96.75	
Invalid/blank votes	306	3.25	
Total votes	9,409	100.00	
Registered voters/turnout	15,305	61.48	

Savo Dorić of New Serbia served as mayor after the election in a coalition government.

===== Ljubovija =====
Results of the election for the Municipal Assembly of Ljubovija:

Party	Votes	%	Seats
Socialist Party of Serbia-Party of United Pensioners of Serbia	2,534	27.91	10
Democratic Party–Serbian Renewal Movement	1,810	19.93	7
Democratic Party of Serbia	1,508	16.61	6
Serbian Radical Party	1,208	13.30	5
New Serbia	821	9.04	3
Citizens' Group: My Ljubovija	721	7.94	3
G17 Plus	478	5.26	1
Total	9,080	100.00	35
Valid votes	9,080	97.04	
Invalid/blank votes	277	2.96	
Total votes	9,357	100.00	
Registered voters/turnout	12,905	72.51	

After the election, a coalition government was formed by the Democratic Party, the Democratic Party of Serbia, New Serbia, the My Ljubovija movement, and G17 Plus. Zoran Nikolić of the Democratic Party was chosen as mayor. He resigned after forty days and was replaced by Miroslav Nenadović of the same party. In June 2009, a new governing coalition was established by the Democratic Party, G17 Plus, and the Socialist Party of Serbia–Party of United Pensioners of Serbia alliance. The Democratic Party and the Socialist Party initially agreed to "rotate" mayors; in accordance with this agreement, Nenandović resigned on 31 December 2009 and was replaced by Milovan Kovačević of the Socialists. Available online sources suggest that the second "rotation" in June 2011 did not occur as planned, and ultimately Kovačević continued serving as mayor until the end of the term.

The far-right Serbian Radical Party served in opposition for the entire term. Parliamentarian Sreto Perić was one of its elected delegates.

===== Loznica =====
Results of the election for the City Assembly of Loznica:

Party	Votes	%	Seats
G17 Plus	9,553	22.39	12
Serbian Radical Party	9,314	21.83	12
Democratic Party–Liberal Democratic Party–Serbian Renewal Movement–Sandžak Democratic Party	6,990	16.38	9
Citizens' Groups (two different lists)	5,152	12.08	4
New Serbia	4,654	10.91	5
Socialist Party of Serbia–Party of United Pensioners of Serbia	3,895	9.13	5
Democratic Party of Serbia	3,104	7.28	4
Total	42,662	100.00	51
Valid votes	42,662	97.01	
Invalid/blank votes	1,314	2.99	
Total votes	43,976	100.00	
Registered voters/turnout	74,086	59.36	

There were several repeat votes in Loznica before the final results were posted. Incumbent mayor Vidoje Petrović of G17 Plus was ultimately confirmed for another term in office, working in a coalition with the Democratic Party's alliance and the Socialist Party of Serbia's alliance.

===== Mali Zvornik =====
Results of the election for the Municipal Assembly of Mali Zvornik:

Party	Votes	%	Seats
Citizens' Groups (four different lists)	2,148	29.13	7
Serbian Radical Party	1,834	24.87	8
Democratic Party	1,569	21.27	7
Democratic Party of Serbia	1,053	14.28	4
Socialist Party of Serbia	651	8.83	3
Party of United Pensioners of Serbia	120	1.63	–
Total	7,375	100.00	29
Valid votes	7,375	97.23	
Invalid/blank votes	210	2.77	
Total votes	7,585	100.00	
Registered voters/turnout	12,202	62.16	

Milan Lukić of the Serbian Radical Party briefly served as mayor after the election. Later in the same year, Milan Todorović of the Democratic Party was elected to the position. Todorović served until 2010, when he was succeeded by Miodrag Lazić of the Socialist Party of Serbia.

===== Vladimirci =====
Results of the election for the Municipal Assembly of Vladimirci:

Party	Votes	%	Seats
Serbian Radical Party	3,230	32.60	10
Democratic Party–G17 Plus	2,842	28.68	8
Socialist Party of Serbia	1,173	11.84	3
Democratic Party of Serbia–New Serbia	888	8.96	2
Citizens' Group: List for Vladimirci	696	7.02	2
Serbian Renewal Movement	457	4.61	–
Strength of Serbia Movement–Bogoljub Karić	445	4.49	–
Liberal Democratic Party	177	1.79	–
Total	9,908	100.00	25
Valid votes	9,908	97.16	
Invalid/blank votes	290	2.84	
Total votes	10,198	100.00	
Registered voters/turnout	16,663	61.20	

Mijailo Milovanović of the Serbian Radical Party was chosen as mayor after the election, governing in a coalition with the Socialist Party of Serbia. In 2010, he was succeeded by Vladica Marković of the Democratic Party.

==== Nišava District ====
Local elections were held for the City Assembly of Niš, the assemblies in all five of Niš's constituent municipalities, and the assemblies in all six of the Nišava District's other municipalities.

The results in the election for the city assembly were inconclusive. As at the republic level, and in Belgrade, a coalition was ultimately formed by the For a European Serbia alliance and the Socialist Party. Representatives of the Democratic Party also claimed the mayors offices in Meridana and Pantelej, while a member of the Socialist Party became mayor in a coalition government in Palilula. The Democratic Party of Serbia dominated the local coalition in Niška Banja, while the Radicals led the coalition government in Crveni Krst (and remained in power following the split in the party).

The Radicals also won the election in Aleksinac and were initially the dominant force in that municipality's governing coalition. After the party split, a new governing coalition came to power with a member of the Democratic Party of Serbia as mayor.

Local incumbents from New Serbia were re-elected in Doljevac and Ražanj, and an incumbent Socialist Party mayor was confirmed for another term in Gadžin Han. In Merošina, a Socialist Party representative served as mayor in a governing alliance with the Democratic Party and G17 Plus. United Peasant Party leader Milija Miletić was chosen as mayor in Svrljig and remained in office for the term that followed, excepting a three-month period in 2009–10.

===== Niš =====
Results of the election for the City Assembly of Niš:

Party	Votes	%	Seats
Serbian Radical Party	35,359	26.76	18
For a European Niš (Democratic Party, Serbian Renewal Movement, Sandžak Democratic Party)	34,201	25.89	18
G17 Plus	14,297	10.82	7
Democratic Party of Serbia–New Serbia	13,932	10.54	7
Socialist Party of Serbia–Party of United Pensioners of Serbia–United Serbia–Strength of Serbia Movement	13,744	10.40	7
Liberal Democratic Party	7,657	5.80	4
Reformist Party	6,666	5.05	–
Zaplanje My Home	2,145	1.62	–
Socialist Freedom Party	1,127	0.85	–
The Will of the People	689	0.52	–
My Serbia Movement	635	0.48	–
Roma Unity Party	568	0.43	–
Roma Party	374	0.28	–
Patriotic Party of the Diaspora	368	0.28	–
Citizens' Group	364	0.28	–
Total	132,126	100.00	61
Valid votes	132,126	97.88	
Invalid/blank votes	2,855	2.12	
Total votes	134,981	100.00	
Registered voters/turnout	227,542	59.32	

The election did not produce a clear winner, and a coalition government was ultimately formed by the Democratic Party, G17 Plus, and the Socialist Party. Miloś Simonović of the Democratic Party served as mayor.

Momir Stojanović, at the time a member of the Socialist Party of Serbia, appeared in the second position on the party's coalition list and was awarded an assembly mandate. He resigned his seat in early 2009 against the backdrop of divisions in the party.

====== Crveni Krst ======
Results of the election for the Municipal Assembly of Crveni Krst:

Party	Votes	%	Seats
Serbian Radical Party	5,893	35.70	10
For a European Niš (Democratic Party, Serbian Renewal Movement, Sandžak Democratic Party)	2,937	17.79	4
G17 Plus	2,031	12.30	3
Socialist Party of Serbia–Party of United Pensioners of Serbia–United Serbia–Strength of Serbia Movement	1,424	8.63	2
Democratic Party of Serbia	1,165	7.06	1
New Serbia	1,135	6.88	1
Reformist Party	799	4.84	–
Liberal Democratic Party	516	3.13	–
Roma Unity Party	206	1.25	–
Socialist Freedom Party	190	1.15	–
Roma Party	117	0.71	–
The Will of the People	93	0.56	–
Total	16,506	100.00	21
Valid votes	16,506	97.43	
Invalid/blank votes	436	2.57	
Total votes	16,942	100.00	
Registered voters/turnout	29,473	57.48	

Incumbent mayor Dragan Bojković of the Serbian Radical Party was confirmed for a new term in office after the election. The government also included the Democratic Party of Serbia and was supported by the Socialists and New Serbia. Bojković was succeeded by fellow Radical Party member Lelica Kostić on 13 July 2009.

====== Medijana ======
Results of the election for the Municipal Assembly of Medijana:

Party	Votes	%	Seats
For a European Niš (Democratic Party)	18,535	37.63	12
Serbian Radical Party	10,050	20.40	6
Socialist Party of Serbia–Party of United Pensioners of Serbia–United Serbia–Strength of Serbia Movement	5,664	11.50	3
G17 Plus	4,343	8.82	2
Democratic Party of Serbia–New Serbia	3,910	7.94	2
Liberal Democratic Party	3,274	6.65	2
Reformist Party	2,375	4.82	–
Zaplanje My Home	672	1.36	–
The Will of the People	245	0.50	–
Patriotic Party of the Diaspora	192	0.39	–
Total	49,260	100.00	27
Valid votes	49,260	98.27	
Invalid/blank votes	867	1.73	
Total votes	50,127	100.00	
Registered voters/turnout	81,280	61.67	

Incumbent mayor Dragoslav Ćirković of the Democratic Party was confirmed for a new term in office after the election.

====== Niška Banja ======
Results of the election for the Municipal Assembly of Niška Banja:

Party	Votes	%	Seats
Democratic Party of Serbia	2,022	24.79	6
Serbian Radical Party	1,587	19.46	4
Zaplanje My Home	1,190	14.59	3
For a European Niš (Democratic Party, Serbian Renewal Movement)	1,117	13.70	3
G17 Plus	670	8.22	1
Socialist Party of Serbia–Party of United Pensioners of Serbia–United Serbia–Strength of Serbia Movement	622	7.63	1
Reformist Party	470	5.76	1
New Serbia	258	3.16	–
Liberal Democratic Party	193	2.37	–
Roma Unity Party	26	0.32	–
Total	8,155	100.00	19
Valid votes	8,155	97.43	
Invalid/blank votes	215	2.57	
Total votes	8,370	100.00	
Registered voters/turnout	12,740	65.70	

Incumbent mayor Zoran Vidanović of the Democratic Party of Serbia was confirmed for another term in office after the election.

====== Palilula, Niš ======
Results of the election for the Municipal Assembly of Palilula, Niš:

Party	Votes	%	Seats
Serbian Radical Party	10,051	28.38	8
For a European Niš (Democratic Party, Serbian Renewal Movement, Sandžak Democratic Party)	8,202	23.16	6
G17 Plus	5,162	14.57	4
Democratic Party of Serbia–New Serbia	3,682	10.39	3
Socialist Party of Serbia–Party of United Pensioners of Serbia–United Serbia–Strength of Serbia Movement	3,609	10.19	3
Reformist Party	2,035	5.75	1
Liberal Democratic Party	1,608	4.54	–
Zaplanje My Home	347	0.98	–
The Will of the People	202	0.57	–
Patriotic Party of the Diaspora	189	0.53	–
Coalition: Roma Party–Roma Renewal Movement	168	0.47	–
Roma Unity Party	166	0.47	–
Total	35,421	100.00	25
Valid votes	35,421	97.60	
Invalid/blank votes	871	2.40	
Total votes	36,292	100.00	
Registered voters/turnout	63,790	56.89	

Igor Novaković of the Socialist Party was chosen as mayor after the election.

====== Pantelej ======
Results of the election for the Municipal Assembly of Pantelej:

Party	Votes	%	Seats
For a European Niš (Democratic Party, Serbian Renewal Movement, Sandžak Democratic Party)	5,755	26.20	7
Serbian Radical Party	5,726	26.07	7
G17 Plus	2,625	11.95	3
Democratic Party of Serbia	1,707	7.77	2
Socialist Party of Serbia–Party of United Pensioners of Serbia–United Serbia–Strength of Serbia Movement	1,542	7.02	1
New Serbia	1,429	6.51	1
Liberal Democratic Party	1,372	6.25	1
Reformist Party	1,130	5.14	1
Socialist Freedom Party	431	1.96	–
"The Will of the People"	153	0.70	–
Roma Party	95	0.43	–
Total	21,965	100.00	23
Valid votes	21,965	97.29	
Invalid/blank votes	611	2.71	
Total votes	22,576	100.00	
Registered voters/turnout	40,259	56.08	

Slaviša Dinić of the Democratic Party was chosen as mayor after the election.

===== Aleksinac =====
Results of the election for the Municipal Assembly of Aleksinac:

Party	Votes	%	Seats
Serbian Radical Party–Tomislav Nikolić	8,032	30.54	18
For a European Serbia–Boris Tadić (Democratic Party)	5,169	19.66	12
Democratic Party of Serbia–New Serbia–Vojislav Koštunica	4,767	18.13	11
Citizens' Group: Movement for the Municipality of Aleksinac–Dr. Zoran Aleksić	2,575	9.79	5
Coalition: Socialist Party of Serbia and Party of United Pensioners of Serbia	2,356	8.96	5
G17 Plus–Grujica Veljković	1,799	6.84	4
United Serbia–Dragan Marković "PALMA"	811	3.08	–
Coalition: Liberal Democratic Party–Strength of Serbia Movement for our Municipality	787	2.99	–
Total	26,296	100.00	55
Valid votes	26,296	97.26	
Invalid/blank votes	740	2.74	
Total votes	27,036	100.00	
Registered voters/turnout	45,793	59.04	

Incumbent mayor Nenad Stanković of the Radical Party was confirmed for another term in office after the election, leading a coalition that also included the Democratic Party of Serbia, the Socialists, the Party of United Pensioners of Serbia, and the Movement for the Municipality of Aleksinac group. The Radicals split later in the year, and Stanković joined the breakaway Serbian Progressive Party, taking twelve other members of the Radical assembly group with him. In November 2008, a new governing majority was established by the Radicals, the Democratic Party of Serbia, New Serbia, the Movement for the Municipality of Aleksinac group, the Serbian Renewal Movement, and G17 Plus. Stanković resigned, and Ivan Dimić of the Democratic Party of Serbia became the new mayor in early 2009.

===== Doljevac =====
Results of the election for the Municipal Assembly of Doljevac:

Party	Votes	%	Seats
New Serbia	6,157	52.33	22
Democratic Party	1,527	12.98	5
Serbian Radical Party–Tomislav Nikolić	1,355	11.52	5
Socialist Party of Serbia–Party of United Pensioners of Serbia–Strength of Serbia Movement	1,032	8.77	3
G17 Plus	628	5.34	2
Democratic Party of Serbia	522	4.44	–
Citizens' Group	361	3.07	–
Liberal Democratic Party	139	1.18	–
Roma Party	45	0.38	–
Total	11,766	100.00	37
Valid votes	11,766	97.81	
Invalid/blank votes	263	2.19	
Total votes	12,029	100.00	
Registered voters/turnout	15,121	79.55	

Incumbent mayor Goran Ljubić of New Serbia was confirmed for another term in office after the election. In 2011, he left New Serbia and joined the United Regions of Serbia.

===== Gadžin Han =====
Results of the election for the Municipal Assembly of Gadžin Han:

Party	Votes	%	Seats
Socialist Party of Serbia–Party of United Pensioners of Serbia–Citizens' Group	1,529	25.26	10
Zaplanje My Home	1,363	22.51	8
Serbian Radical Party	856	14.14	5
For a European Serbia (Democratic Party, G17 Plus)	804	13.28	5
Democratic Party of Serbia	789	13.03	5
New Serbia	272	4.49	–
Citizens' Group	246	4.06	–
Strength of Serbia Movement	195	3.22	–
Total	6,054	100.00	33
Valid votes	6,054	96.45	
Invalid/blank votes	223	3.55	
Total votes	6,277	100.00	
Registered voters/turnout	8,360	75.08	

Incumbent mayor Saša Đorđević of the Socialist Party was confirmed for another term in office after the election.

===== Merošina =====
Results of the election for the Municipal Assembly of Merošina:

Party	Votes	%	Seats
Citizens' Groups (six different lists)	2,263	25.17	7
Serbian Radical Party	2,055	22.86	9
G17 Plus	1,468	16.33	7
Socialist Party of Serbia–Party of United Pensioners of Serbia	1,443	16.05	7
Democratic Party of Serbia–New Serbia	851	9.47	4
Democratic Party	632	7.03	3
United Peasant Party	279	3.10	–
Total	8,991	100.00	37
Valid votes	8,991	97.37	
Invalid/blank votes	243	2.63	
Total votes	9,234	100.00	
Registered voters/turnout	11,713	78.84	

Slobodan Todorović of the Socialist Party was chosen as mayor after the election, in a coalition government that also included the Democratic Party and G17 Plus.

===== Ražanj =====
Results of the election for the Municipal Assembly of Ražanj:

Party	Votes	%	Seats
New Serbia	2,035	39.23	14
For a European Serbia (Democratic Party, G17 Plus)	784	15.11	5
Serbian Radical Party	766	14.76	5
Socialist Party of Serbia	405	7.81	2
Citizens' Group	344	6.63	2
Democratic Party of Serbia	326	6.28	2
"United Serbia"	269	5.19	1
Party of United Pensioners of Serbia	132	2.54	–
Coalition: Liberal Democratic Party–Christian Democratic Party of Serbia	127	2.45	–
Total	5,188	100.00	31
Valid votes	5,188	96.56	
Invalid/blank votes	185	3.44	
Total votes	5,373	100.00	
Registered voters/turnout	8,513	63.12	

Incumbent mayor Dobrica Stojković of New Serbia was confirmed for another term in office after the election.

===== Svrljig =====
Results of the election for the Municipal Assembly of Svrljig:

Party	Votes	%	Seats
United Peasant Party	2,312	26.12	13
Serbian Radical Party	1,074	12.14	6
Socialist Party of Serbia–Party of United Pensioners of Serbia	862	9.74	4
Democratic Party	825	9.32	4
G17 Plus	772	8.72	4
Democratic Party of Serbia	771	8.71	4
New Serbia	475	5.37	2
Citizens' Group	423	4.78	–
"United Serbia"	412	4.66	–
Reformist Party	392	4.43	–
Serbian Democratic Renewal Movement	298	3.37	–
Liberal Democratic Party	234	2.64	–
Total	8,850	100.00	37
Valid votes	8,850	96.93	
Invalid/blank votes	280	3.07	
Total votes	9,130	100.00	
Registered voters/turnout	13,999	65.22	

Milija Miletić of the United Peasant Party was chosen as mayor after the election. He was removed from office in December 2009 and was replaced by Slavica Božinović of the Democratic Party, who governed in a coalition with G17 Plus, the Socialists, New Serbia, and the Democratic Party of Serbia. In March 2010, Miletić returned to office in an alliance with the Radical Party.

==== Podunavlje District ====
Local elections were held in the one city (Smederevo) and the two other municipalities of the Podunavlje District. The Serbian Radical Party technically won the election in Smederevo but fell well short of a majority; the Democratic Party, which finished second, was able to form a coalition government. The Democratic Party also won in Smederevska Palanka, while the Democratic Party of Serbia won in Velika Plana.

===== Smederevo =====
Results of the election for the City Assembly of Smederevo:

Party	Votes	%	Seats
Serbian Radical Party–Tomislav Nikolić	10,850	20.55	16
For a European Serbia–Boris Tadić (Democratic Party, Sandžak Democratic Party)	9,435	17.87	14
Citizens' Group: Movement for Smederevo–Dr. Jasna Avramović	8,056	15.26	12
Coalition for a Better Smederevo, Serbian Renewal Movement, Smederevo Democratic Party–Milan Lukić	7,924	15.01	11
Democratic Party of Serbia–New Serbia–Vojislav Koštunica	7,098	13.45	10
Socialist Party of Serbia (SPS)–Party of United Pensioners of Serbia (PUPS)–League of Communists of Yugoslavia in Serbia (SKJ)–Movement of Wartime Veterans of Serbia–Citizens' Group: Smederevo Union–Association of Roma	4,736	8.97	7
LDP (Liberal Democratic Party)–Čedomir Jovanović	1,822	3.45	–
G17 Plus–Mlađan Dinkić	1,047	1.98	–
United Serbia–Strength of Serbia Movement–Dragan Marković Palma	698	1.32	–
Roma for Roma–Roma Unity Party	500	0.95	–
Citizens' Group: "Smederevo People's Assembly–Slaviša Perić"	340	0.64	–
Smederevo Citizens' Alliance–Snežana Ivanović	280	0.53	–
Total	52,786	100.00	70
Valid votes	52,935	97.45	
Invalid/blank votes	1,384	2.55	
Total votes	54,319	100.00	
Registered voters/turnout	97,044	55.97	

Predrag Umičević of the Democratic Party was chosen as mayor after the election.

===== Smederevska Palanka =====
Results of the election for the Municipal Assembly of Smederevska Palanka:

Party	Votes	%	Seats
Democratic Party	6,694	26.17	14
Citizens' Groups (three different lists)	4,971	19.43	10
Serbian Radical Party	4,945	19.33	10
Socialist Party of Serbia–Party of United Pensioners of Serbia–Strength of Serbia Movement	2,712	10.60	6
New Serbia	1,721	6.73	3
Democratic Party of Serbia	1,378	5.39	3
United Serbia	1,362	5.32	3
G17 Plus	1,014	3.96	–
Liberal Democratic Party	785	3.07	–
Total	25,582	100.00	49
Valid votes	25,582	96.65	
Invalid/blank votes	886	3.35	
Total votes	26,468	100.00	
Registered voters/turnout	45,908	57.65	

Nenad Milojičić of the Democratic Party was chosen as mayor after the election. He was succeeded by Živko Petrović of the same party in 2010.

===== Velika Plana =====
Results of the election for the Municipal Assembly of Velika Plana:

Party	Votes	%	Seats
Democratic Party of Serbia	5,352	26.02	12
Serbian Radical Party	5,039	24.50	11
Democratic Party	4,368	21.23	9
Socialist Party of Serbia–Party of United Pensioners of Serbia–Liberals of Serbia	1,908	9.28	4
United Serbia	1,697	8.25	3
Liberal Democratic Party–Serbian Renewal Movement	933	4.54	–
G17 Plus	699	3.40	–
Strength of Serbia Movement–Bogoljub Karić	574	2.79	–
Total	20,570	100.00	39
Valid votes	20,570	97.47	
Invalid/blank votes	534	2.53	
Total votes	21,104	100.00	
Registered voters/turnout	38,306	55.09	

Incumbent mayor Dejan Šulkić of the Democratic Party of Serbia was confirmed for another term in office after the election.

==== Pomoravlje District ====
Local elections were held in the one city (Jagodina) and all five other municipalities of the Pomoravlje District. United Serbia won a majority victory in its home base of Jagodina in an alliance with the Socialist Party of Serbia; a member of United Serbia also claimed the mayoralty in Ćuprija as part of the Socialist Party's alliance.

The Democratic Party won in Despotovac, Paraćin, and Rekovac. In Svilajnac, a member of G17 Plus claimed the mayoralty in alliance with the Democratic Party.

===== Jagodina =====
Results of the election for the City Assembly of Jagodina:

Party	Votes	%	Seats
United Serbia–SPS–PUPS–Dragan Marković Palma	20,110	54.80	19
For a European Serbia–Boris Tadić (Democratic Party, G17 Plus)	7,188	19.59	7
Serbian Radical Party–Tomislav Nikolić	3,816	10.40	3
Democratic Party of Serbia–Vojislav Koštunica	2,237	6.10	2
Liberal Democratic Party	1,280	3.49	–
New Serbia–Velimir Ilić	574	1.56	–
Social Democratic Party	536	1.46	–
Strength of Serbia Movement	409	1.11	–
Roma Party–Srđan Šajn	340	0.93	–
Citizens' Group: Srba Josijević–Četnik	205	0.56	–
Total	36,695	100.00	31
Valid votes	36,695	96.05	
Invalid/blank votes	1,509	3.95	
Total votes	38,204	100.00	
Registered voters/turnout	63,167	60.48	

Incumbent mayor Dragan Marković Palma, the leader of United Serbia, was confirmed for another term in office after the election. Petar Petrović, also of United Serbia, was chosen as deputy mayor. Petrović stood down in October 2011, as he could not hold a dual mandate as a parliamentarian as a member of the city executive.

Života Starčević was elected to the assembly on the Democratic Party of Serbia list.

===== Ćuprija =====
Results of the election for the Municipal Assembly of Ćuprija:

Party	Votes	%	Seats
Socialist Party of Serbia–Party of United Pensioners of Serbia–United Serbia	4,578	26.98	11
Democratic Party	3,412	20.11	8
Serbian Radical Party	2,480	14.62	6
Citizens' Groups (two different lists)	2,388	14.07	5
G17 Plus	1,661	9.79	4
Democratic Party of Serbia	1,193	7.03	3
New Serbia–Strength of Serbia Movement	519	3.06	–
Liberal Democratic Party	502	2.96	–
Vlach Democratic Party of Serbia	235	1.38	–
Total	16,968	100.00	37
Valid votes	16,968	96.70	
Invalid/blank votes	579	3.30	
Total votes	17,547	100.00	
Registered voters/turnout	30,784	57.00	

Borivoje Kalaba of United Serbia was chosen as mayor after the election.

===== Despotovac =====
Results of the election for the Municipal Assembly of Despotovac:

Party	Votes	%	Seats
Democratic Party	6,478	44.54	23
Serbian Radical Party	2,611	17.95	9
United Serbia–Socialist Party of Serbia–New Serbia	1,674	11.51	5
Democratic Party of Serbia	1,379	9.48	4
G17 Plus	1,293	8.89	4
Party of United Pensioners of Serbia	716	4.92	–
Liberal Democratic Party–Serbian Renewal Movement	394	2.71	–
Total	14,545	100.00	45
Valid votes	14,545	97.33	
Invalid/blank votes	399	2.67	
Total votes	14,944	100.00	
Registered voters/turnout	25,362	58.92	

Mališa Alimpijević of the Democratic Party was chosen as mayor after the election.

===== Paraćin =====
Results of the election for the Municipal Assembly of Paraćin:

Party	Votes	%	Seats
Democratic Party–Boris Tadić	11,476	35.74	21
Serbian Renewal Movement–Dr. Goran Burgić	5,585	17.39	10
Serbian Radical Party–Tomislav Nikolić	5,529	17.22	10
DSS–Dr. Vojislav Koštunica	3,489	10.87	6
G17 Plus–Mlađan Dinkić	3,206	9.98	5
Socialist Party of Serbia (SPS)–Party of United Pensioners of Serbia (PUPS)–United Serbia (JS)–Milan Vidanović Biba	1,858	5.79	3
Liberal Democratic Party	676	2.11	–
Citizens' Group: Momir Stanisavljević - Moša	293	0.91	–
Total	32,112	100.00	55
Valid votes	32,112	97.65	
Invalid/blank votes	772	2.35	
Total votes	32,884	100.00	
Registered voters/turnout	51,337	64.06	

Incumbent mayor Saša Paunović of the Democratic Party was confirmed for another term in office after the election.

===== Rekovac =====
Results of the election for the Municipal Assembly of Rekovac:

Party	Votes	%	Seats
Democratic Party	2,187	27.15	10
Democratic Party of Serbia	1,675	20.80	8
United Serbia	1,207	14.99	5
Serbian Radical Party	809	10.04	3
Socialist Party of Serbia	739	9.18	3
Citizens' Group: Together for Levač	437	5.43	2
G17 Plus	427	5.30	2
Serbian Renewal Movement	416	5.17	–
New Serbia	157	1.95	–
Total	8,054	100.00	33
Valid votes	8,054	96.65	
Invalid/blank votes	279	3.35	
Total votes	8,333	100.00	
Registered voters/turnout	11,017	75.64	

Dragan Prodanović of the Democratic Party was chosen as mayor after the election.

===== Svilajnac =====
Results of the election for the Municipal Assembly of Svilajnac:

Party	Votes	%	Seats
Democratic Party–G17 Plus	5,588	38.94	21
Serbian Radical Party	2,299	16.02	9
Citizens' Group: For a Rich Municipality of Svilajnac	2,120	14.77	8
Democratic Party of Serbia	1,517	10.57	5
Citizens' Group: Movement for Svilajnac	1,111	7.74	4
Citizens' Group: The World and Ours	698	4.86	–
Socialist Party of Serbia–Party of United Pensioners of Serbia–United Serbia	669	4.66	–
Liberal Democratic Party	350	2.44	–
Total	14,352	100.00	47
Valid votes	14,352	96.84	
Invalid/blank votes	468	3.16	
Total votes	14,820	100.00	
Registered voters/turnout	26,217	56.53	

Gorica Dimčić Tasić of G17 Plus was chosen as mayor after the election.

==== Raška District ====
Local elections were held in the two cities (Kraljevo and Novi Pazar) and the three other municipalities of the Raška District. The Democratic Party won plurality victories in Kraljevo and Vrnjačka Banja and, following periods of political instability in both communities, was ultimately able to form relatively stable coalition governments. The Serbian Radical Party won in Raška and held power for most of the term that followed.

The Sandžak Democratic Party won in the predominantly Bosniak city of Novi Pazar, and the Party of Democratic Action of Sandžak won in the municipality of Tutin.

===== Kraljevo =====
Results of the election for the City Assembly of Kraljevo:

Party	Votes	%	Seats
For a European Serbia–Boris Tadić (Democratic Party, G17 Plus, Serbian Renewal Movement)	19,054	33.79	26
Serbian Radical Party–Tomislav Nikolić	13,036	23.12	18
Democratic Party of Serbia–New Serbia–Velimir Ilić	12,151	21.55	16
Movement for Kraljevo–Dr. Ljubiša Jovašević	4,623	8.20	6
Socialist Party of Serbia–Party of United Pensioners of Serbia	3,483	6.18	4
Liberal Democratic Party–Social Democratic Union	1,834	3.25	–
United Serbia–Dragan Marković Palma	1,673	2.97	–
My Serbia Movement	533	0.95	–
Total	56,387	100.00	70
Valid votes	56,387	97.53	
Invalid/blank votes	1,426	2.47	
Total votes	57,813	100.00	
Registered voters/turnout	104,029	55.57	

The Serbian Radical Party, Democratic Party of Serbia, New Serbia, and Socialist Party of Serbia formed a coalition government after the election. Incumbent mayor Miloš Babić of New Serbia was confirmed for another term in office on 16 June 2008, and Vesna Nikolić Vukajlović of the Serbian Radical Party was chosen as deputy mayor. The Socialists withdrew from the governing coalition before the end of 2008.

Babić died of a heart attack on 27 February 2009. Nikolić Vukajlović served as acting mayor until 19 March 2009, when a new coalition of For a European Serbia, the Socialist Party of Serbia, and the Movement for Kraljevo came to power with Ljubiša Simović of the Democratic Party as mayor. This coalition proved unstable as well, and the Movement for Kraljevo soon withdrew its support from the administration.

On 15 April 2010, a coalition of the Serbian Radical Party, the Democratic Party of Serbia, and the Movement for Kraljevo temporarily attained a majority of seats in the assembly under extremely contentious circumstances. Ljubiša Jovašević of the Movement for Kraljevo was chosen as mayor. The ZES–SPS coalition did not accept the legitimacy of Jovašević's election, and a chaotic situation emerged in which two rival administrations, backed by two rival assemblies, claimed to be the city's government.

The ZES–SPS coalition ultimately regained control of the local government on 7 July 2010; Simonović was confirmed as the city's legitimate mayor, and the previous election of Jovašević as mayor was annulled. The government became more stable after this time, and Simonović served as mayor for the remainder of the term.

By virtue of accepting an executive role in the city government on 16 June 2008, Vesna Nikolić Vukajlović was required to resign her seat in the city assembly. She reclaimed her seat on 19 June 2009. On 24 April 2010, the disputed city assembly associated with Ljubiša Jovašević appointed her as director of the public company Toplana, and she was required to resign her seat once again. Divisions later arose in the local Radical Party, and she was removed as the company's director on 22 June 2010. On 16 July 2010, after Simonović's administration was restored to power, the city assembly annulled both her appointment and subsequent dismissal.

===== Novi Pazar =====
Results of the election for the City Assembly of Novi Pazar:

Party	Votes	%	Seats
For a European Novi Pazar–Boris Tadić, Rasim Ljajić	21,449	44.75	23
Bosniak List for a European Sandžak–Sulejman Ugljanin	16,770	34.99	18
United Serbian List: Serbian Radical Party–Democratic Party of Serbia–New Serbia–Socialist Party of Serbia	6,200	12.94	6
Liberal Democratic Party–Čedomir Jovanović	1,490	3.11	–
Party for Sandžak–Fevzija Murić	1,436	3.00	–
Sandžak Democratic Union–European Union–Zehnija Bulić	401	0.84	–
European Movement of Sandžak	185	0.39	–
Total	47,931	100.00	47
Valid votes	47,931	98.87	
Invalid/blank votes	548	1.13	
Total votes	48,479	100.00	
Registered voters/turnout	74,552	65.03	

Mirsad Đerlek of Sandžak Democratic Party (a member of the For a European Novi Pazar alliance) was chosen as mayor after the election, leading a coalition government that also included the United Serbian List. He was replaced by Meho Mahmutović, also of the Sandžak Democratic Party, in September 2009.

Ahmedin Škrijelj of the Party of Democratic Action of Sandžak was elected on the list of the Bosniak List for a European Sandžak.

===== Raška =====
Results of the election for the Municipal Assembly of Raška:

Party	Votes	%	Seats
Serbian Radical Party–Tomislav Nikolić	4,035	28.96	12
Socialist Party of Serbia (SPS)–Party of United Pensioners of Serbia (PUPS)	3,067	22.01	9
Democratic Party–Boris Tadić	2,318	16.64	6
Democratic Party of Serbia–Vojislav Koštunica	2,075	14.89	6
Coalition for Raška–LDP, LS, PSS, DHSS–Spread Further–Uroš Milenković	910	6.53	2
Action for Raška–G17 Plus–Serbian Renewal Movement–Green Ecological Party	610	4.38	–
Movement of Veterans of Serbia–For the Honour and Pride of Raška	606	4.35	–
New Serbia–Velimir Ilić	312	2.24	–
Total	13,933	100.00	35
Valid votes	13,933	96.76	
Invalid/blank votes	466	3.24	
Total votes	14,399	100.00	
Registered voters/turnout	21,670	66.45	

Radenko Cvetić of the Serbian Radical Party was chosen as mayor after the election. In December 2010, the Democratic Party and the Socialist Party of Serbia formed a new coalition with Dragiša Ilić as mayor. He remained in office for a year; in December 2011, another political realignment in the municipality brought Cvetić back to power.

===== Tutin =====
Results of the election for the City Assembly of Tutin:

Party	Votes	%	Seats
Coalition: Bosniak List for a European Sandžak "Dr. Sulejman Ugljanin"	8,873	50.45	21
For a European Tutin, Boris Tadić–Rasim Ljajić (Sandžak Democratic Party, Democratic Party)	5,178	29.44	12
Together for Tutin, Dr. Šerif Hamzagić (G17 Plus, Citizens' Group)	1,629	9.26	3
LDP–Čedomir Jovanović	700	3.98	–
Party for Sandžak–Fevzija Murić	540	3.07	1
Alliance for Change (Sandžak People's Movement, Citizens' Group)	397	2.26	–
Serbian Radical Party	271	1.54	–
Total	17,588	100.00	37
Valid votes	17,588	98.78	
Invalid/blank votes	218	1.22	
Total votes	17,806	100.00	
Registered voters/turnout	29,407	60.55	

Incumbent mayor Šemsudin Kučević of the Party of Democratic Action of Sandžak (the leading party in the Bosniak List for a European Sandžak coalition) was confirmed for another term in office after the election. He resigned shortly thereafter to become a deputy director in Serbia's Office for Sustainable Development of Underdeveloped Areas, and Bajro Gegić of the same party was chosen as his successor.

===== Vrnjačka Banja =====
Results of the election for the City Assembly of Vrnjačka Banja:

Party	Votes	%	Seats
For a European Serbia–Boris Tadić	4,602	29.42	9
Serbian Radical Party–Tomislav Nikolić	3,571	22.83	7
New Serbia–Rodoljub Džamić	2,342	14.97	5
Democratic Party of Serbia–Vojislav Koštunica	1,359	8.69	2
Socialist Party of Serbia (SPS)–Party of United Pensioners of Serbia (PUPS)–Socialist People's Party (SNS)–Milomir Perović Perula	926	5.92	1
Liberal Democratic Party–Čedomir Jovanović–Vrnjčanin	894	5.72	1
Citizens' Group: Banja Above All–Radovan Popović-Pop	590	3.77	–
Coalition: Serbian Renewal Movement and Political Party Serbian League Janković-Mitevski Svetlana	517	3.31	–
United Serbia–Vojislav Vujić	361	2.31	–
For My Village and Our Banja–Citizens' Group: "Novoselac–Zeleni" Žarko Marković	296	1.89	–
Citizens' Group: For Youth and Sports–Zoran Martinović Marta	182	1.16	–
Total	15,640	100.00	25
Valid votes	15,640	97.27	
Invalid/blank votes	439	2.73	
Total votes	16,079	100.00	
Registered voters/turnout	23,560	68.25	

The municipality of Vrnjačka Banja did not constitute a government within the legal deadline, and a new election was held on 10 November 2008. Zoran Seizović of the Democratic Party was appointed as leader of a provincial authority.

The results of the repeat election were as follows:

Party	Votes	%	Seats
Coalition: For a European Vrnjačka Banja–Boris Tadić (Democratic Party, G17 Plus, Serbian Renewal Movement)	5,058	34.56	10
Citizens' Group: Forward Serbia–Tomislav Nikolić	2,079	14.20	4
New Serbia–Rodoljub Džamić	1,622	11.08	3
Citizens' Group: Banja Is the Law	992	6.78	2
United Serbia–Dragan Marković Palma	976	6.67	2
Democratic Party of Serbia–Vojislav Koštunica	973	6.65	2
Citizens' Group: Movement for Change Vrnjačka Banja	880	6.01	1
Movement of Socialists–Nikola Trifunović Borinac	799	5.46	1
Socialist Party of Serbia Vrnjačka Banja	566	3.87	–
LDP–Čedomir Jovanović	286	1.95	–
Serbian Radical Party–Dr. Vojislav Šešelj	216	1.48	–
Citizens' Group: For Our Banja and Village Above All–Radovan Popović Pop	190	1.30	–
Total	14,637	100.00	25
Valid votes	14,637	97.81	
Invalid/blank votes	328	2.19	
Total votes	14,965	100.00	
Registered voters/turnout	23,713	63.11	

Zoran Seizović of the Democratic Party was chosen as mayor after the election.

==== Šumadija District ====
Elections were held in the one city (Kragujevac) and all six municipalities of the Šumadija District. Incumbent mayor Veroljub Stevanović was re-elected in Kragujevac in an alliance with G17 Plus. The Democratic Party won in Batočina and Knić, candidates of New Serbia won the mayoralties in Topola and Rača, and the Serbian Renewal Movement won in Lapovo. A candidate of the Serbian Radical Party won in Aranđelovac but was removed from office the following year, and an administration led by the Democratic Party was established.

===== Kragujevac =====
Results of the election for the City Assembly of Kragujevac:

Party	Votes	%	Seats
Veroljub Verko Stevanović (G17 Plus and Together for Kragujevac)	43,306	44.45	41
Serbian Radical Party–Tomislav Nikolić	19,451	19.97	18
For a European Serbia–Boris Tadić (Democratic Party, Serbian Renewal Movement)	14,662	15.05	14
Socialist Party of Serbia (SPS)–Party of United Pensioners of Serbia (PUPS)–United Serbia (JS)–Prof. Dr. Slavica Đukić Dejanović	8,893	9.13	8
Democratic Party of Serbia–New Serbia–Dr. Vladan Vučićević	6,468	6.64	6
Liberal Democratic Party–Čedomir Jovanović	2,518	2.58	–
Coalition: PSS, Social Democracy, SDS–"Mića Borić"–Dragan Popović	1,104	1.13	–
For Workers and Peasants–People's Movement–Radiša Pavlović	668	0.69	–
Roma Union of Serbia–Rajko Đurić	349	0.36	–
Total	97,419	100.00	87
Valid votes	97,419	97.82	
Invalid/blank votes	2,173	2.18	
Total votes	99,592	100.00	
Registered voters/turnout	151,436	65.77	

Incumbent mayor and Together for Kragujevac leader Veroljub Stevanović was confirmed for another term in office after the election.

Parliamentarian Nataša Jovanović was elected from the lead position on the Serbian Radical Party's list.

Mirko Čikiriz of the Serbian Renewal Movement was elected on the For a European Serbia list. He resigned from the city assembly on 10 October 2008.

===== Aranđelovac =====
Results of the election for the Municipal Assembly of Aranđelovac:

Party	Votes	%	Seats
Serbian Radical Party	6,601	28.48	14
For a European Serbia–Boris Tadić (Democratic Party, G17 Plus)	5,968	25.75	12
Socialist Party of Serbia–Party of United Pensioners of Serbia	3,102	13.38	6
Democratic Party of Serbia	2,075	8.95	4
New Serbia	1,403	6.05	3
Serbian Renewal Movement	1,299	5.60	2
Liberal Democratic Party	1,012	4.37	–
United Serbia	554	2.39	–
Citizens' Group (one list)	480	2.07	–
Our Šumadija	452	1.95	–
Serbian Democratic Renewal Movement	232	1.00	–
Total	23,178	100.00	41

Incumbent mayor Radosav Švabić of the Radical Party was confirmed for another term in office after the election. He was arrested in June 2009, and the local assembly was dissolved in November of the same year. Vlada Gajić of the Democratic Party led a provisional administration prior to a new local election in 2010.

===== Batočina =====
Results of the election for the Municipal Assembly of Batočina:

Party	Votes	%	Seats
Democratic Party–Boris Tadić	3,233	41.12	18
Serbian Radical Party–Tomislav Nikolić	1,050	13.35	5
Citizens' Group: Movement for Batočina–Zoran Jevtić	1,003	12.76	5
Together for Batočina–Veroljub Verko Stevanović	621	7.90	3
Democratic Party of Serbia–Slađan Krstić	514	6.54	2
G17 Plus–Serbian Renewal Movement–Prof. Dule Popović	422	5.37	2
Socialist Party of Serbia–Party of United Pensioners of Serbia–Čedomir Petrović	383	4.87	–
United Serbia–United for Batočina–Dragan Marković Palma	293	3.73	–
New Serbia–Velimir Ilić	280	3.56	–
Liberal Democratic Party–Aleksandar Đorđević	64	0.81	–
Total	7,863	100.00	35
Valid votes	7,863	97.79	
Invalid/blank votes	178	2.21	
Total votes	8,041	100.00	
Registered voters/turnout	10,341	77.76	

Incumbent mayor Radiša Milošević of the Democratic Party was confirmed for another term in office after the election.

===== Knić =====
Results of the election for the Municipal Assembly of Knić:

Party	Votes	%	Seats
Citizens' Groups (two different lists)	1,741	21.17	7
Democratic Party	1,556	18.92	7
New Serbia	1,210	14.72	5
Serbian Radical Party	1,185	14.41	5
Coalition: Together for Knić and Gruža	682	8.29	3
G17 Plus	459	5.58	2
Democratic Party of Serbia	452	5.50	2
Socialist Party of Serbia–Party of United Pensioners of Serbia	431	5.24	2
Liberal Democratic Party	182	2.21	–
Serbian Renewal Movement–Strength of Serbia Movement	175	2.13	–
Coalition: Workers' Resistance, United Peasant Party, and People's Peasant Party	149	1.81	–
Total	8,222	100.00	33
Valid votes	8,222	96.68	
Invalid/blank votes	282	3.32	
Total votes	8,504	100.00	
Registered voters/turnout	12,509	67.98	

Borislav Burarac of the Democratic Party was chosen as mayor after the election.

===== Lapovo =====
Results of the election for the Municipal Assembly of Lapovo:

Party	Votes	%	Seats
All for Lapovo–Serbian Renewal Movement–Dragan Zlatković	1,149	26.25	9
Serbian Radical Party–Tomislav Nikolić	1,050	23.99	8
Democratic Party–Boris Tadić	737	16.84	5
Socialist Party of Serbia (SPS)–Party of United Pensioners of Serbia (PUPS)–Ljutica Krstić	465	10.62	3
G17 Plus–Mika Solunac	345	7.88	2
Citizens' Group: Lapovo Youth Association–Bojan Stojković	248	5.67	2
Democratic Party of Serbia–New Serbia–Vojislav Koštunica	215	4.91	–
United Serbia–Dragan Marković Palma	107	2.44	–
Liberal Democratic Party–Ivan Petrović	61	1.39	–
Total	4,377	100.00	29
Valid votes	4,377	97.29	
Invalid/blank votes	122	2.71	
Total votes	4,499	100.00	
Registered voters/turnout	7,185	62.62	

Incumbent mayor Dragan Zlatković of the Serbian Renewal Movement was confirmed for another term in office after the election.

===== Rača =====
Results of the election for the Municipal Assembly of Rača:

Party	Votes	%	Seats
Democratic Party–Boris Tadić	1,966	27.78	9
Democratic Party of Serbia–New Serbia–Vojislav Koštunica	1,933	27.31	9
Serbian Radical Party–Tomislav Nikolić	963	13.61	4
Socialist Party of Serbia (SPS)–Party of United Pensioners of Serbia (PUPS)–United Serbia (JS)–Dušan Đoković	866	12.24	4
G17 Plus–Nebojša Pavlović	471	6.65	2
Coalition: Serbian Renewal Movement–Liberal Democratic Party	459	6.48	2
Movement for Rača and Our Villages–Milovan Miki Radovanović	420	5.93	1
Total	7,078	100.00	31
Valid votes	7,078	98.29	
Invalid/blank votes	123	1.71	
Total votes	7,201	100.00	
Registered voters/turnout	10,456	68.87	

Dragana Živanović of New Serbia was chosen as mayor after the election.

===== Topola =====
Results of the election for the Municipal Assembly of Topola:

Party	Votes	%	Seats
Democratic Party of Serbia–New Serbia	7,944	59.01	27
Democratic Party	1,744	12.96	5
Serbian Radical Party	1,730	12.85	5
G17 Plus	869	6.46	2
Socialist Party of Serbia–Party of United Pensioners of Serbia	691	5.13	2
Liberal Democratic Party	483	3.59	–
Total	13,461	100.00	41
Valid votes	13,461	97.89	
Invalid/blank votes	290	2.11	
Total votes	13,751	100.00	
Registered voters/turnout	19,848	69.28	

Incumbent mayor Dragan Jovanović of New Serbia was confirmed for another term in office after the election.

==== Zlatibor District ====
Elections were held in the one city (Užice) and all nine municipalities of the Zlatibor District.

Coalitions including the Democratic Party (DS) came to power in Užice, Arilje, Bajina Bašta (where a member of the Socialist Party of Serbia became mayor), and Nova Varoš. The Serbian Radical Party initially formed government in Požega, but a new administration led by the DS assumed power in 2009.

Incumbent mayor Milan Stamatović led the Democratic Party of Serbia (DSS) to a majority victory in Čajetina. A coalition led by the DSS also came to power in Kosjerić, though it proved unstable; a new election was held in the municipality in 2009, and a coalition around the DS came to power there as well.

The Radical Party formed government in Priboj. After a party split later in the year, the local Radical Party leadership, including the mayor, joined the breakaway Serbian Progressive Party.

Prijepolje did not constitute a government within the required time, and a new election was held in December 2008. A coalition of the Sandžak Democratic Party, the Serbian Progressive Party, and the DS and its allies came to power; a member of the Progressives was chosen as mayor.

The Party of Democratic Action of Sandžak initially formed government in the predominantly Bosniak community of Sjenica. Later in the year, a new coalition led by the Sandžak Democratic Party came to power.

===== Užice =====
Results of the election for the City Assembly of Užice:

Party	Votes	%	Seats
For a European Serbia–Boris Tadić (Democratic Party, G17 Plus)	16,667	41.51	28
"Užice to Win–Tihomir Petković–DSS, NS, League for Užice, PUPS"	9,867	24.58	17
Serbian Radical Party–Tomislav Nikolić	7,779	19.38	13
Socialist Party of Serbia and Movement for Užice–Milovan Petrović	3,530	8.79	6
Liberal Democratic Party–Dr. Snežana Janjić	2,305	5.74	3
Total	40,148	100.00	67
Valid votes	40,148	97.88	
Invalid/blank votes	870	2.12	
Total votes	41,018	100.00	
Registered voters/turnout	69,590	58.94	

Jovan Marković of the Democratic Party was chosen as mayor after the election.

===== Arilje =====
Results of the election for the Municipal Assembly of Arilje:

Party	Votes	%	Seats
Democratic Party	3,214	30.59	11
Serbian Radical Party	2,544	24.22	9
Citizens' Group: All for Arilje	1,374	13.08	5
New Serbia	992	9.44	3
Democratic Party of Serbia	983	9.36	3
Socialist Party of Serbia–Party of United Pensioners of Serbia–Strength of Serbia Movement	713	6.79	2
G17 Plus–Serbian Renewal Movement	544	5.18	1
Movement of Veterans of Serbia	141	1.34	–
Total	10,505	100.00	34
Valid votes	10,505	96.79	
Invalid/blank votes	348	3.21	
Total votes	10,853	100.00	
Registered voters/turnout	16,063	67.57	

Mirjana Avakumović of the Democratic Party was chosen as mayor after the election.

===== Bajina Bašta =====
Results of the election for the Municipal Assembly of Bajina Bašta:

Party	Votes	%	Seats
Serbian Radical Party	4,230	30.20	15
Democratic Party–G17 Plus–Serbian Renewal Movement	4,156	29.67	14
Democratic Party of Serbia–New Serbia	2,377	16.97	8
Socialist Party of Serbia–Party of United Pensioners of Serbia	2,246	16.03	8
Liberal Democratic Party	594	4.24	–
Citizens' Group	404	2.88	–
Total	14,007	100.00	45
Valid votes	14,007	97.86	
Invalid/blank votes	306	2.14	
Total votes	14,313	100.00	
Registered voters/turnout	22,860	62.61	

The Democratic Party and the Socialist Party of Serbia emerged as the leading parties in Bajina Bašta's coalition government after the election, and incumbent mayor Miloje Savić of the Socialists was chosen for a new term in office. The Serbian Radical Party and the Democratic Party of Serbia formed a new government in April 2011 after the defection of two G17 Plus delegates, and Zlatan Jovanović of the Radicals became mayor.

===== Čajetina =====
Results of the election for the Municipal Assembly of Čajetina:

Party	Votes	%	Seats
Democratic Party of Serbia–Vojislav Koštunica	4,428	48.53	18
Democratic Party–Boris Tadić	1,640	17.97	6
SRS–Tomislav Nikolić	854	9.36	3
New Serbia–Velimir Ilić	725	7.95	2
Socialist Party of Serbia	531	5.82	2
Coalition: SPO–LDP	453	4.96	–
G17 Plus–Mlađan Dinkić	310	3.40	–
Citizens' Group: Sincerely for the People–Borko Cvetić	183	2.01	–
Total	9,124	100.00	31
Valid votes	9,124	97.87	
Invalid/blank votes	199	2.13	
Total votes	9,323	100.00	
Registered voters/turnout	12,872	72.43	

Incumbent mayor Milan Stamatović of the Democratic Party of Serbia was confirmed for another term in office after the election.

Future parliamentarian Bojana Božanić appeared in the seventh position on the Democratic Party of Serbia's list. She does not appear to have taken a mandate but instead served as an assistant to Stamatović.

===== Kosjerić =====
Results of the election for the Municipal Assembly of Kosjerić:

Party	Votes	%	Seats
Coalition: Democratic Party–G17 Plus–Serbian Renewal Movement	2,877	38.63	12
Democratic Party of Serbia	1,180	15.84	5
Citizens' Groups (three different lists)	921	12.37	–
Serbian Radical Party	902	12.11	4
New Serbia	842	11.31	3
Coalition: Socialist Party of Serbia–Party of United Pensioners of Serbia	726	9.75	3
Total	7,448	100.00	27
Valid votes	7,448	97.85	
Invalid/blank votes	164	2.15	
Total votes	7,612	100.00	
Registered voters/turnout	11,016	69.10	

Incumbent mayor Željko Prodanović of the Democratic Party of Serbia was confirmed for another term in office after the election. Prodanović was subsequently removed from office on 26 February 2009, and a provisional administration was established with Milan Štulović of the Democratic Party as its leader. A new election was held in June 2009.

===== Nova Varoš =====
Results of the election for the Municipal Assembly of Nova Varoš:

Party	Votes	%	Seats
Coalition: Democratic Party–G17 Plus	2,409	22.65	7
Citizens' Groups (two different lists)	2,140	20.12	4
Serbian Radical Party	2,033	19.12	6
Coalition: Socialist Party of Serbia–Party of United Pensioners of Serbia	1,337	12.57	4
Democratic Party of Serbia	996	9.37	3
New Serbia–Serbian Renewal Movement	947	8.90	2
Sandžak Democratic Party	657	6.18	1
Liberal Democratic Party	116	1.09	–
Total	10,635	100.00	27
Valid votes	10,635	97.31	
Invalid/blank votes	294	2.69	
Total votes	10,929	100.00	
Registered voters/turnout	15,501	70.51	

Slaviša Purić of the Democratic Party was chosen as mayor after the elections, leading a coalition government that also included the Socialist Party of Serbia and G17 Plus.

===== Požega =====
Results of the election for the Municipal Assembly of Požega:

Party	Votes	%	Seats
Serbian Radical Party	4,797	31.38	16
Coalition: Democratic Party–G17 Plus–Serbian Renewal Movement	4,256	27.84	15
Democratic Party of Serbia–New Serbia	2,728	17.84	9
Coalition: Socialist Party of Serbia–Strength of Serbia Movement	2,054	13.44	7
Liberal Democratic Party	1,453	9.50	5
Total	15,288	100.00	52
Valid votes	15,288	97.21	
Invalid/blank votes	438	2.79	
Total votes	15,726	100.00	
Registered voters/turnout	26,276	59.85	

Aleksandar Grbović of the Serbian Radical Party was chosen as mayor after the election. A new governing coalition came to power in May 2009, and Milovan Mićović of the Democratic Party succeeded Grbović as mayor.

===== Priboj =====
Results of the election for the Municipal Assembly of Priboj:

Party	Votes	%	Seats
Coalition: Serbian Radical Party–Democratic Party of Serbia	4,384	28.29	13
Democratic Party	2,048	13.22	6
Citizens' Groups (two lists)	1,747	11.27	3
Sandžak Democratic Party	1,725	11.13	5
Coalition: Socialist Party of Serbia–Party of United Pensioners of Serbia	1,535	9.91	4
New Serbia	1,332	8.60	4
Liberal Democratic Party	1,164	7.51	3
Coalition: G17 Plus–Serbian Renewal Movement	921	5.94	2
Party of Democratic Action of Sandžak	641	4.14	1
Total	15,497	100.00	41
Valid votes	15,497	97.85	
Invalid/blank votes	341	2.15	
Total votes	15,838	100.00	
Registered voters/turnout	27,181	58.27	

Lazar Rvović of the Serbian Radical Party was chosen as mayor after the election. When the Radical Party split later in the year, Rvović and the entire Radical Party board in Priboj joined the breakaway Serbian Progressive Party. He continued serving as mayor for the remainder of the term.

===== Prijepolje =====
Results of the election for the Municipal Assembly of Prijepolje:

Party	Votes	%	Seats
Unison Serbian Radical Party–Democratic Party of Serbia–New Serbia	7,943	36.81	25
Democratic Party of the Sandžak–Dr. Zulkefil Bato Sadović	5,276	24.45	17
Democratic Party–Boris Tadić	1,810	8.39	5
Bosniak List for a European Sandžak–Dr. Sulejman Ugljanin	1,606	7.44	5
Sandžak Democratic Party–Dr. Rasim Ljajić	1,589	7.36	5
Socialist Party of Serbia (SPS)–Party of United Pensioners of Serbia (PUPS)–Strength of Serbia Movement (PSS)	1,421	6.58	4
Citizens' Group: Prijepolje	984	4.56	–
Liberal Democratic Party–Čedomir Jovanović	951	4.41	–
Total	21,580	100.00	61
Valid votes	21,580	98.29	
Invalid/blank votes	376	1.71	
Total votes	21,956	100.00	
Registered voters/turnout	35,031	62.68	

Future parliamentarian Slobodan Gojković appeared in the second position on the Democratic Party's list. Former mayor Radojko Petrić appeared in the fourth position on the Socialist Party's list.

The municipality of Prijepolje did not constitute a government within the legal deadline, and a new election was held on 10 November 2008. Dobra Lazarević of the Democratic Party was named as the leader of a provisional administration in August 2008.

The results of the repeat election were as follows:

Party	Votes	%	Seats
Sandžak Democratic Party–Rasim Ljajić	5,458	26.66	18
Citizen's Group: Forward Serbia–Tomislav Nikolić	3,063	14.96	10
Together for a Better Prijepolje–(DS, SPS, G17 Plus, SPO)	3,002	14.66	9
Democratic Party of the Sandžak–Dr. Zulkefil Bato Sadović	2,597	12.69	8
Unison Democratic Party of Serbia–New Serbia	1,511	7.38	4
Serbian Radical Party–Dr. Vojislav Šešelj	1,421	6.94	4
Bosniak List for a European Sandžak–Dr. Sulejman Ugljanin	1,286	6.28	4
Liberal Democratic Party–Čedomir Jovanović	1,277	6.24	4
Citizens' Group: Prijepolje and Party of United Pensioners of Serbia	857	4.19	–
Total	20,472	100.00	61
Valid votes	20,472	99.18	
Invalid/blank votes	169	0.82	
Total votes	20,641	100.00	
Registered voters/turnout	35,160	58.71	

The Sandžak Democratic Party, the Forward Serbia group (which later became the Serbian Progressive Party), and the coalition around the Democratic Party formed government after the election. Dragoljub Zindović of the Progressives was chosen as mayor. He formally took office in February 2009.

Future parliamentarian Slobodan Gojković and former mayor Radojko Petrić were both elected to the assembly on the Together for a Better Prijepolje list, Gojković from the third position as a Democratic Party candidate and Petrić from the forty-fourth position as a Socialist Party of Serbia candidate. Gojković subsequently led the Together for a Better Prijepolje group in the assembly.

===== Sjenica =====
Results of the election for the Municipal Assembly of Sjenica:

Party	Votes	%	Seats
Bosniak List for a European Sandžak–Dr. Sulejman Ugljanin	4,518	35.35	14
Coalition for a European Sjenica (Sandžak Democratic Party, DS, LDP)	3,618	28.31	12
European Movement of Sandžak Coalition–Džemail Suljević	1,087	8.51	3
Democratic Party of Serbia	1,028	8.04	3
United Serbian List Serbian Radical Party–Socialist Party of Serbia–New Serbia	956	7.48	3
League for Sjenica–G17 Plus–Dr. Esad Zornić	793	6.21	2
Citizens' Groups (two different lists)	780	6.10	2
Total	12,780	100.00	39
Valid votes	12,780	99.34	
Invalid/blank votes	85	0.66	
Total votes	12,865	100.00	
Registered voters/turnout	26,024	49.44	

Nusret Nuhović of the Party of Democratic Action of Sandžak (the main party in the Bosniak List for a European Sandžak) was chosen as mayor after the election. A new governing coalition came to power in December 2008, and Muriz Turković of the Sandžak Democratic Party succeeded Nuhović as mayor.
