= Veroljub Matić =

Serbian politician (born 1953)

Veroljub Matić (Serbian Cyrillic: Верољуб Матић; born April 6, 1953) is a politician in Serbia. He has served three terms as mayor of Koceljeva and has been a member of the National Assembly of Serbia since 2014, serving with the Serbian Progressive Party.

== Private career ==
Matić is an engineer and a professor of geodesy.

== Politician ==
=== Municipal politics ===
Matić was a member of the Socialist Party of Serbia until being expelled in 1998. He was elected as a councillor in Koceljeva in the 2000 municipal elections and as mayor of the municipality in 2004, on both occasions as an independent candidate. When direct mayoral elections were abolished following the 2004 campaign, he founded a citizens' group that won ten out of thirty-one municipal assembly seats in the 2008 elections and eighteen seats in 2012. On each occasion, he was selected by the assembly for a new term as mayor.

Matić's group aligned itself with the Progressives after the 2012 elections. He stood down as mayor in late 2014 and instead became president (i.e., speaker) of the municipal assembly. Under his leadership, the Progressives won landslide victories with twenty-seven out of thirty-one seats in the 2016 local elections and twenty-eight seats in the 2020 elections. Matić remains president of the municipal assembly as of 2020.

=== Parliamentarian ===
Matić received the fourteenth position on the Progressive Party's Aleksandar Vučić — Future We Believe In electoral list in the 2014 Serbian parliamentary election and was elected when the list won a landslide victory with 158 out of 250 mandates. In no small part due to the strength of Matić's local political organization, the Progressive-led list won 71.1% of the vote in Koceljeva – its best result in the country. In the sitting of parliament that followed, Matić served on the agriculture, forestry and water management committee and the committee on administrative, budgetary, mandate and immunity issues, and was a substitute member of Serbia's delegation to the Parliamentary Assembly of the Council of Europe, where he caucused with the European People's Party.

He received the sixteenth position on the Progressive Party's successor Aleksandar Vučić – Serbia Is Winning list in the 2016 election and was re-elected when the party won a second consecutive landslide victory with 131 seats. He served on the same committees in 2016–20 as in the previous sitting of the assembly and was a member of Serbia's delegation to the Parliamentary Dimension of the Central European Initiative and the parliamentary friendship groups with Austria, Belarus, Bosnia and Herzegovina, Croatia, the Czech Republic, Germany, Indonesia, Italy, Montenegro, Norway, Romania, Russia, Slovakia, and Slovenia.

He received the sixty-third position on the Progressive Party's Aleksandar Vučić — For Our Children coalition list in the 2020 Serbian parliamentary election and was elected to a third term in the national assembly when the list won a landslide majority with 188 mandates. He remains a member of the administrative and agriculture committees and is a deputy member of the committee on spatial planning, transport, infrastructure, and telecommunications.
