= Dragan Božić (Serbian politician, born 1959) =

Serbian politician

Dragan Božić (Serbian Cyrillic: Драган Божић; born 18 November 1959) is a Serbian politician. He served in the Assembly of Vojvodina from 2004 to 2008 as a member of the Democratic Party of Serbia (DSS).

== Private career ==
Božić is from Ruma and holds a master's degree as a pharmacist.

== Politician ==
Božić was given the 123rd position on the Democratic Party of Serbia's electoral list in the 2003 Serbian parliamentary election. The list won fifty-three seats, and he was not included in his party's assembly delegation. (From 2000 to 2011, Serbian parliamentary mandates were awarded to sponsoring parties rather than individual candidates, and it was common practice for parties to assign the mandates out of numerical order. Božić's list position had no formal bearing on his chances of election.)

=== Assembly of Vojvodina ===
Provincial elections in Vojvodina were held under a system of mixed proportional representation from 2004 to 2012. Božić received the fifth position on the DSS's list in the 2004 provincial election and was awarded a mandate when the list won four seats. The Democratic Party (DS) won the election, and the DSS served in opposition for the term that followed. Božić was a member of the committee for health, social policy, and labour, and the committee for determining the identity of provincial regulations in languages of official use.

He appeared in the thirty-first position on a coalition list of the DSS and New Serbia (NS) in the 2008 provincial election. The list won four seats, and he was not given a mandate for a second term.

=== Local politics ===
The DSS won three seats in Ruma in the 2004 Serbian local elections, and Božić became one of his party's delegates in the municipal assembly. The far-right Serbian Radical Party (SRS) won a significant plurality victory in Ruma and afterward formed a coalition government with the DSS. Božić served as a supporter of the administration.

In 2007, three SRS delegates left the party and allowed the DS to form a new administration. The SRS–DSS coalition refused to cede power, leading to a chaotic situation in which both sides claimed to be the municipality's legitimate government. This situation continued until March 2008, when the Serbian government appointed a provisional council for the municipality.

The 2008 local elections in Ruma continued the stalemate, with both the DS and the SRS winning eighteen seats, the DSS winning four, and the alliance around the Socialist Party of Serbia (SPS) winning three. Local Radical Party leader Aleksandar Martinović and Božić announced a new SRS–DSS coalition in June 2008, but it never took power; one Radical delegate mysteriously left the area, and the DSS withdrew its support. The DS subsequently tried to form its own coalition with the DSS and the SPS, but this also failed. The assembly was ultimately dissolved for a repeat election in November.

The DS and its allies won a convincing victory in the repeat vote, while the DSS–NS coalition finished third with six seats. Božić led the DSS group in the assembly for the term that followed, serving in opposition. He does not appear to have been a candidate for re-election in 2012.
