= Dragoljub Zindović =

Serbian politician

Dragoljub Zindović (Serbian Cyrillic: Драгољуб Зиндовић; born 25 September 1965) is a politician in Serbia. He served as mayor of Prijepolje for two terms, was commissioner of the Zlatibor District from 2013 to 2014, and was a member of the National Assembly of Serbia from 2014 to 2016. During his time in office, Zindović was a member Serbian Progressive Party (Srpska napredna stranka, SNS).

Zindović was arrested on charges of corruption in 2020.

== Private career ==
Zindović was raised in Prijepolje, in what was then the Socialist Republic of Serbia in the Socialist Federal Republic of Yugoslavia. He graduated from the University of Belgrade Faculty of Economics and became a teacher. From 1998 to 2009, he worked at the Prijepolje School of Economics. He was also an assistant teaching associate at the Čačak Technical High School from 2006 to 2009.

== Politician ==
=== First term as mayor (2009–12) ===
Zindović first became mayor of Prijepolje under somewhat unusual circumstances. The 2008 Serbian local elections in May did not produce a clear winner in the municipality, and, as the municipality did not constitute a government in the allotted time, the vote was repeated in November. The Serbian Progressive Party was established in September 2008, and the repeat vote in Prijepolje was the first election that it contested; the party won ten seats out of sixty-one and took part in a coalition government with the Sandžak Democratic Party (Sandžačka demokratska partija, SDP) and an alliance led by the Democratic Party (Demokratska stranka, DS). Zindović, as the local Progressive leader, was appointed as mayor. He formally took office in February 2009; at the time, he was the only Progressive Party mayor in Serbia.

Zindović led the Progressive Party's list for Prijepolje in the 2012 local elections and was re-elected to the local assembly when the list once again won ten mandates. A new governing coalition was formed without the SNS, and Zindović stood down as mayor. He also received the 133rd position on the SNS's list in the 2012 Serbian parliamentary election; the list won seventy-three seats, and he was not elected.

=== Commissioner and parliamentarian (2012–16) ===
Zindović was appointed as commissioner of the Zlatibor District in January 2013.

He was given the seventy-first position on the SNS's list in the 2014 parliamentary election and was elected when the list won a landslide majority with 158 out of 250 seats. By virtue of becoming an elected member of parliament, he was required to resign as commissioner. In parliament, he was a member of the committee on the economy, regional development, trade, tourism, and energy; a deputy member of the committee on Kosovo and Metohija; and a member of the parliamentary friendship groups with Belarus, Brazil, Canada, Egypt, France, Israel, Italy, the Republic of Macedonia, Montenegro, Russia, Spain, the United States of America.

He was not a candidate in the 2016 parliamentary election.

=== Second term as mayor (2016–20) ===
Zindović once again led the Progressive Party's list in Prijepolje in the 2016 local elections and was elected when the list won fourteen seats. A new local coalition government was formed after the election, and Zindović was once again chosen as mayor. He served a full term and was not a candidate for re-election in 2020.

== 2020 arrest ==
In November 2020, Zindović was arrested on suspicion of corruption. Among other things, he was accused of corruption in issuing halal certificates and in the oversight of sports. His arrest was announced by Serbian president Aleksandar Vučić.
