= 2003 Serbian local elections =

A small number of Serbian municipalities held local elections in 2003. These were not part of the country's regular cycle of local elections but took place in certain jurisdictions where the local government had fallen.

Serbia had introduced the direct election of mayors via two-round voting in 2002. Local assembly elections, which had been held under first past the post voting in single-member constituencies in the last regular cycle in 2000, were now determined by proportional representation with a three per cent electoral threshold. Successful lists were required to receive three per cent of all votes, not only of valid votes.

== Results ==
=== Central Serbia ===
==== Ćuprija ====
After a period of political instability, new elections took place in Ćuprija on 26 October 2003 to elect a mayor and members of the municipal assembly. The second round of voting in the mayoral election took place on 9 November 2003.

2003 Municipality of Ćuprija local election: Mayor of Ćuprija
Candidate	Party	First round		Second round	
Candidate	Party	Votes	%	Votes	%
Prof. Dr. Sc. Ljubomir Marić	Socialist Party of Serbia		26.47	5,182	65.41
Ivica Jocić	Party of Serbian Unity		17.3	2,740	34.59
Miroslav Stojanović	Social Democratic Party		12.56		
Zoran Jovanović	Democratic Party		11.73		
other candidates					
Total				7,922	100.00

Results of the municipal assembly election:

Party	Votes	%	Seats
Socialist Party of Serbia	2,198	18.15	8
Party of Serbian Unity	2,103	17.36	8
Democratic Party	1,445	11.93	5
Citizens' Groups (eleven lists)	1,109	9.16	–
Social Democratic Party-SDP and Citizens' Group: Mića Brica	893	7.37	3
Democratic Party of Serbia	770	6.36	3
Serbian Radical Party	712	5.88	3
G17 Plus	661	5.46	3
Serbian Renewal Movement	506	4.18	2
Christian Democratic Party of Serbia	408	3.37	2
Liberals of Serbia	374	3.09	–
Civic Alliance of Serbia	287	2.37	–
People's Democratic Party	203	1.68	–
New Serbia	182	1.50	–
Social Democracy	135	1.11	–
Democratic Centre	127	1.05	–
Total	12,113	100.00	37
Valid votes	12,113	94.76	
Invalid/blank votes	670	5.24	
Total votes	12,783	100.00	
Registered voters/turnout	30,922	41.34	

==== Kraljevo ====
Mayor Ljubiša Jovašević of the Democratic Party of Serbia had lost the support of the municipal assembly by mid-2003, and the local government became unstable. The Serbian government dissolved the assembly in July 2003 and called new mayoral and assembly elections for November. Marko Petrović, formerly of New Serbia, was appointed to lead a provisional administration pending the vote. The assembly election and the first round of the mayoral election took place on 16 November; the second round of the mayoral electoral took place on 30 November.

2003 Municipality of Kraljevo local election: Mayor of Kraljevo
Candidate	Party	First round		Second round	
Candidate	Party	Votes	%	Votes	%
Dr. Radoslav Jović	Serbian Renewal Movement	10,514	22.34	17,230	58.99
Dr. Ljubiša Jovašević	Democratic Party of Serbia–People's Democratic Party–Vojislav Koštunica	7,618	16.19	11,978	41.01
Miroslav Karapandžić	Citizens' Group: For Kraljevo	5,542	11.78		
Zvonko Obradović	G17 Plus	5,204	11.06		
Slobodan Mihajlović	Democratic Party	5,192	11.03		
Miljko Četrović	Serbian Radical Party	4,375	9.30		
Sreten Jovanović	Socialist Party of Serbia	3,079	6.54		
Prof. Dr. Predrag Stojanović Peđa	Christian Democratic Party of Serbia	2,607	5.54		
Zoran Jovanović	People's Party and "Revival of Serbia"	1,772	3.77		
Stamenka Arsić	Liberals of Serbia and Democratic Centre	1,152	2.45		
Total		47,055	100.00	29,208	100.00
Valid votes		47,055	96.96	29,208	98.15
Invalid/blank votes		1,477	3.04	550	1.85
Total votes		48,532	100.00	29,758	100.00
Registered voters/turnout		101,521	47.80	101,521	29.31

Results of the municipal assembly election:

Party	Votes	%	Seats
Serbian Radical Party	6,787	15.02	13
SPO–Dr. Radoslav Jović	6,494	14.38	12
Democratic Party–Slobodan Mihajlović	5,520	12.22	11
Democratic Party of Serbia–People's Democratic Party–Vojislav Koštunica	5,497	12.17	10
G17 Plus–Mlađan Dinkić	4,818	10.67	9
Socialist Party of Serbia–Miloš Nešović Neško	3,563	7.89	7
Christian Democratic Party of Serbia–Peđa Stojanović	2,373	5.25	5
New Serbia–Velimir Ilić	1,739	3.85	3
Citizens' Groups (five other lists)	1,437	3.18	–
Citizens' Group: Otpor!	1,309	2.90	–
People's Party–Milan Paroški–"Revival of Serbia"–Milovan Drecun	1,053	2.33	–
Socialist People's Party–Bane Ivković	1,021	2.26	–
Liberals of Serbia and Democratic Centre	699	1.55	–
Party of Serbian Unity–Prof. Borislav Pelević	694	1.54	–
League for Šumadija–Zvonko Terzić	560	1.24	–
Labour Party of Serbia–Dragan Milovanović	552	1.22	–
Union Serbians–Damjanović Milosav Pakonja–Roma People's Party–Zoran Petrović Zeta	296	0.66	–
Union of Greens–Janko Janković	270	0.60	–
Social Democratic Party	229	0.51	–
Patriotic Party of the Diaspora	161	0.36	–
Citizens' Group: Nikola Todorović	102	0.23	–
Total	45,174	100.00	70
Valid votes	45,174	93.08	
Invalid/blank votes	3,358	6.92	
Total votes	48,532	100.00	
Registered voters/turnout	101,521	47.80	

==== Priboj ====
The alliance around the Socialist Party of Serbia had won the 2000 municipal elections in Priboj, and the incumbent Socialist mayor Desimir Ćirković was initially confirmed for another term in office. Twenty-two members of the municipal assembly (i.e., a narrow majority of the forty-one member body) resigned their seats in early 2002, and on 14 February 2002 the Serbian government appointed a new provisional administration led by Milenko Milićević of the Democratic Party.

Elections took place on 21 September 2003 to elect a mayor and members of the municipal assembly. There was a second round of voting in the mayoral contest on 5 October 2003.

2003 Municipality of Priboj local election: Mayor of Priboj
Candidate	Party	First round		Second round	
Candidate	Party	Votes	%	Votes	%
Milenko Milićević	Together for Priboj (Democratic Party, Civic Alliance of Serbia, Liberals of Serbia) (Affiliation: Democratic Party)	4,572	39.80	5,360	54.72
Vitomir Pijevac	Socialist Party of Serbia	2,046	17.55	4,435	45.28
Bratislav Kojadinović	Serbian Renewal Movement–People's Party (Affiliation: Serbian Renewal Movement)	1,922	16.48		
other candidates					
Total				9,795	100.00

Results of the municipal assembly election:

Party	Votes	%	Seats
Together for Priboj (Democratic Party, Civic Alliance of Serbia, Liberals of Serbia)	2,090	18.52	9
Socialist Party of Serbia	1,825	16.17	8
Sandžak Democratic Party	1,741	15.43	7
Coalition: Serbian Renewal Movement and New Serbia	1,407	12.47	6
Democratic Party of Serbia	1,292	11.45	5
Serbian Radical Party	926	8.21	4
Party of Democratic Action of Sandžak	384	3.40	2
Democratic Centre–Democratic Alternative	314	2.78	–
Citizens' Groups (five different lists)	528	4.68	–
Christian Democratic Party of Serbia	300	2.66	–
G17 Plus	286	2.53	–
Social Democratic Party	190	1.68	–
Total	11,283	100.00	41
Valid votes	11,283	95.91	
Invalid/blank votes	481	4.09	
Total votes	11,764	100.00	
Registered voters/turnout	25,719	45.74	
