= Predrag Stojanović =

Serbian academic and politician

Predrag Stojanović (Serbian Cyrillic: Предраг Стојановић; born 3 April 1958) is a Serbian academic and former politician. He served in the National Assembly of Serbia from 2001 to 2004 as a member of the Christian Democratic Party of Serbia (Demohrišćanska Stranka Srbije, DHSS) and has held high political office in Kraljevo.

In 2007, Stojanović was charged in relation to the "Indeks" scandal, in which a number of University of Kragujevac law professors were accused of taking part in a grades-for-payment scheme. The case against him is still active as of 2022, and no verdict has yet been issued. He has denied the charges.

== Early life and career ==
Stojanović was born in Kraljevo, in what was then the People's Republic of Serbia in the Federal People's Republic of Yugoslavia. He graduated with a bachelor's degree from the University of Kragujevac Faculty of Law in 1980 and later earned a master's degree and Ph.D from the University of Belgrade Faculty of Law (both 1984). He began working at the University of Kragujevac as a trainee assistant in 1981 and ultimately became a full professor in 2000.

== Politician ==
=== Democratic Party of Serbia ===
Stojanović was an opponent of Slobodan Milošević's administration in the 1990s and became politically active as a member of the Democratic Party of Serbia (Demokratska stranka Srbije, DSS). The DSS contested the 1996 Serbian local elections in Kraljevo in conjunction with the opposition Zajedno alliance, which won a narrow majority victory in the city. Stojanović was among the Zajedno candidates elected and was chosen in February 1997 as vice-president of the local assembly, a position that was at the time equivalent to deputy mayor.

The DSS experienced a serious split in 1997, largely over the extent of its ongoing cooperation with Zajedno. A group led by Vladan Batić supported closer co-operation and left the party to form the Christian Democratic Party of Serbia; Stojanović sided with Batić and joined the new party. Ironically, the Zajedno alliance was itself falling apart at the republic level at around the same time.

=== Christian Democratic Party of Serbia ===
In 2000, the DHSS joined the Democratic Opposition of Serbia (Demokratska opozicija Srbije, DOS), a broad and ideologically diverse coalition of parties opposed to the Milošević administration. DOS leader Vojislav Koštunica defeated Milošević in the 2000 Yugoslavian presidential election, a watershed moment in Serbian and Yugoslavian politics. The Serbian government fell after Milošević's defeat in the Yugoslavian election, and a new Serbian parliamentary election was called for December 2000. Prior to the election, Serbia's electoral laws were reformed such that all mandates were awarded to candidates on successful lists at the discretion of the sponsoring parties or coalitions, irrespective of numerical order. Stojanović received the sixth position on the DHSS's electoral list and was given a mandate when the list won a landslide majority victory with 176 out of 250 seats.

In parliament, Stojanović was the president of the education committee and a member of the finance committee, the foreign affairs committee, and the justice and administration committee. He was elected as a DHSS vice-president in December 2000 and re-elected to the same role in December 2002. A vocal opponent of communism, he brought forward legislation in September 2003 to open state security files from the years when Serbia was a one-party socialist state.

The Serbian government dissolved the Kraljevo municipal assembly in July 2003 following a period of instability and called new mayoral and assembly elections for November of the same year. Stojanović ran as the DHSS's candidate in the mayoral contest and was defeated in the first round of voting, finishing in eighth place. The DHSS won five seats in the local assembly and participated in a coalition government after the election; Stojanović was not himself a member of the government but was generally responsible for co-ordinating the party's local activities.

The DHSS contested the 2003 parliamentary election at the head of the Independent Serbia (Samostalna Srbija) alliance. Stojanović appeared in the seventh position on its electoral list, which did not cross the electoral threshold to win assembly representation; his term ended when the new assembly convened in January 2004.

For the 2007 parliamentary election, the DHSS participated in a coalition led by the Liberal Democratic Party (Liberalno demokratska partija, LDP), and Stojanović received the 221st position on a list that was mostly alphabetical. The list won fifteen seats; by virtue of a pre-election arrangement, the DHSS received only one mandate, which was assigned to party leader Vladan Batić.

== "Indeks" charges ==
In February 2007, Stojanović and other professors from the University of Kragujevac Faculty of Law were arrested in a grades-for-payment scandal that involved the selling of exam papers. Stojanović has consistently denied the charges against him, at one time remarking, "For me, as a respected professor, it is beneath my honour to sell exams to anyone, least of all to students." He was initially represented by Vladan Batić, who suggested that the charges were politically motivated. "Thousands of people can confirm what kind of humanist he is and that he is the last person who could ask for a bribe," Batić was quoted as saying. "I think he was detained because of the political balance, because he is from DHSS, and [fellow accused] Professor Emilija Stanković [...] is from DSS." Batić died in 2010.

Notwithstanding the charges against him, Stojanović was elected as dean of the law faculty in July 2009 and re-elected to the same position in May 2012. He resigned in April 2014 due to health concerns.

The case against Stojanović has been delayed many times, in large part due to his ongoing health issues and hospitalizations. In December 2016, he was briefly detained for not responding to a court summons. He entered a plea of not guilty later in the same month and finished presenting his defense in January 2017. Several professors implicated in the scandal were found guilty in late 2019; Stojanović's case was not resolved at this time as the proceedings against him had been placed under a separate indictment.

== Electoral record ==
2003 Municipality of Kraljevo local election: Mayor of Kraljevo
Candidate	Party	First round		Second round	
Candidate	Party	Votes	%	Votes	%
Dr. Radoslav Jović	Serbian Renewal Movement	10,514	22.34	17,230	58.99
Dr. Ljubiša Jovašević	Democratic Party of Serbia–People's Democratic Party–Vojislav Koštunica	7,618	16.19	11,978	41.01
Miroslav Karapandžić	Citizens' Group: For Kraljevo	5,542	11.78		
Zvonko Obradović	G17 Plus	5,204	11.06		
Slobodan Mihajlović	Democratic Party	5,192	11.03		
Miljko Četrović	Serbian Radical Party	4,375	9.30		
Sreten Jovanović	Socialist Party of Serbia	3,079	6.54		
Prof. Dr. Predrag Stojanović Peđa	Christian Democratic Party of Serbia	2,607	5.54		
Zoran Jovanović	People's Party and "Revival of Serbia"	1,772	3.77		
Stamenka Arsić	Liberals of Serbia and Democratic Centre	1,152	2.45		
Total		47,055	100.00	29,208	100.00
Valid votes		47,055	96.96	29,208	98.15
Invalid/blank votes		1,477	3.04	550	1.85
Total votes		48,532	100.00	29,758	100.00
Registered voters/turnout		101,521	47.80	101,521	29.31
