= Slobodan Mihajlović (politician) =

Serbian politician

Slobodan Mihajlović (Serbian Cyrillic: Слободан Михајловић; born 26 March 1957) is a Serbian politician. He served in the National Assembly of Serbia from 2004 to 2007 as a member of the Democratic Party (Demokratska stranka, DS).

== Private career ==
Mihajlović was born in Kraljevo, in what was then the People's Republic of Serbia in the Federal People's Republic of Yugoslavia. He is a graduate of the University of Belgrade Faculty of Economics and worked for several years with Elektrosrbija Kraljevo, eventually rising to the position of director. In 2005, he accused former Kraljevo mayor Ljubiša Jovašević from the rival Democratic Party of Serbia (Demokratska stranka Srbije, DSS) of exerting de facto control over the utility and undermining its work.

== Politician ==
Mihajlović became politically active in 1996 and was a prominent member of the Democratic Party's Kraljevo board by the early 2000s. He was the party's candidate for mayor of Kraljevo in a special off-year election in November 2003 and finished fifth against Radoslav Jović of the Serbian Renewal Movement (Srpski pokret obnove, SPO).

The following month, he appeared in the 232nd position (out of 250) on the DS's electoral list for the 2003 Serbian parliamentary election. The list won thirty-seven seats; he was not initially included in his party's delegation but received a mandate on 17 February 2004 as the replacement for another member who had resigned. (From 2000 to 2011, Serbian parliamentary mandates were awarded to candidates on successful lists at the discretion of the sponsoring parties or coalitions, and it was common practice for the mandates to be assigned out of numerical order. Mihajlović's position on the list – which was in any case mostly alphabetical – had no formal bearing on whether or when received a mandate.) The DS served in opposition for the parliament that followed, and Mihajlović was a member of the industry committee.

Jović resigned as mayor of Kraljevo in late 2005, and a by-election was held in February 2006 to choose his replacement. Mihajlović once again ran as the DS's candidate and finished third. He did not appear on the DS's list in the 2007 parliamentary election, and his assembly term ended in that year.

Serbia's electoral system was reformed in 2011, such that all mandates were assigned in numerical order to candidates on successful lists. Mihaljlović received the fifth position on the DS's list for Kraljevo in the 2012 Serbian local elections and was elected to the city assembly when the list won thirteen out of seventy seats. The DS served in opposition in the term that followed. Mihajlović did not seek re-election in 2016 and has not returned to public life since this time.

== Electoral record ==
=== Local (Kraljevo) ===
2006 Municipality of Kraljevo local by-election: Mayor of Kraljevo
Candidate	Party	First round		Second round	
Candidate	Party	Votes	%	Votes	%
Dr. Miloš Babić	New Serbia–Velimir Ilić	14,509	42.07	20,068	76.84
Miljko Četrović	Serbian Radical Party	5,477	15.88	6,048	23.16
Slobodan Mihajlović	Democratic Party–Boris Tadić	3,658	10.61		
Zvonko Obradović	G17 Plus	2,947	8.54		
Mirko Vuković	Serbian Renewal Movement	2,674	7.75		
Prof. Dr. Dragoslav Kočović	Socialist Party of Serbia	1,713	4.97		
Đorđe Pavlović	Strength of Serbia Movement–Bogoljub Karić	1,622	4.70		
Dr. Zoran Miljković	Citizens' Group: Movement: Kraljevo Above All	1,336	3.87		
Zoran Jovanović	People's Party	553	1.60		
Total		34,489	100.00	26,116	100.00
Valid votes		34,489	98.51	26,116	98.46
Invalid/blank votes		523	1.49	409	1.54
Total votes		35,012	100.00	26,525	100.00
Registered voters/turnout		102,152	34.27	102,152	25.97

2003 Municipality of Kraljevo local election: Mayor of Kraljevo
Candidate	Party	First round		Second round	
Candidate	Party	Votes	%	Votes	%
Dr. Radoslav Jović	Serbian Renewal Movement	10,514	22.34	17,230	58.99
Dr. Ljubiša Jovašević	Democratic Party of Serbia–People's Democratic Party–Vojislav Koštunica	7,618	16.19	11,978	41.01
Miroslav Karapandžić	Citizens' Group: For Kraljevo	5,542	11.78		
Zvonko Obradović	G17 Plus	5,204	11.06		
Slobodan Mihajlović	Democratic Party	5,192	11.03		
Miljko Četrović	Serbian Radical Party	4,375	9.30		
Sreten Jovanović	Socialist Party of Serbia	3,079	6.54		
Prof. Dr. Predrag Stojanović Peđa	Christian Democratic Party of Serbia	2,607	5.54		
Zoran Jovanović	People's Party and "Revival of Serbia"	1,772	3.77		
Stamenka Arsić	Liberals of Serbia and Democratic Centre	1,152	2.45		
Total		47,055	100.00	29,208	100.00
Valid votes		47,055	96.96	29,208	98.15
Invalid/blank votes		1,477	3.04	550	1.85
Total votes		48,532	100.00	29,758	100.00
Registered voters/turnout		101,521	47.80	101,521	29.31
