= Ljubiša Jovašević =

Serbian physician and politician (born 1953)

Ljubiša Jovašević (Serbian Cyrillic: Љубиша Јовашевић; born 20 December 1953) is a Serbian medical doctor and politician. He was a parliamentarian in the Federal Republic of Yugoslavia and its successor State Union of Serbia and Montenegro from 2000 to 2006 and has served as the mayor of Kraljevo on two occasions. A member of the Democratic Party of Serbia (Demokratska stranka Srbije, DSS) for many years, he left the party in 2007 to form the Movement for Kraljevo (Pokret za Kraljevo). From 2010 to 2018, he was the de facto leader of the Movement of United Local Self-Governments (Pokret ujedinjenih lokalnih samouprava, PULS).

== Early life and private career ==
Jovašević was born in Sarajevo, in what was then the People's Republic of Bosnia and Herzegovina in the Federal People's Republic of Yugoslavia. He graduated from the Faculty of Medicine in 1978 and worked in Reading, United Kingdom, as part of his internship. He later specialized at the clinic for orthopedic surgery and traumatology at the University of Belgrade Faculty of Medicine, completed post-graduate studies in London, and in 1988 became the leader of the on-call trauma group at the Emergency Center in Belgrade. He earned his Ph.D in 1992; he has taught at the University of Priština in Leposavić and has published in his field.

== Politician ==
=== Early years ===
Jovašević was a founding member of the Democratic Party (Demokratska stranka, DS) in 1990. When the party split in 1992, he joined the breakaway Democratic Party of Serbia. He appeared in the eighth position on the DSS's electoral list for the Kragujevac division in the 1993 Serbian parliamentary election; the list won two seats, and he did not receive a mandate. (From 1992 to 2000, Serbia's electoral law stipulated that one-third of parliamentary mandates would be assigned to candidates on successful lists in numerical order, while the remaining two-thirds would be distributed amongst other candidates at the discretion of sponsoring parties or coalitions. Jovašević could theoretically have been awarded a mandate despite his list position, but he was not.)

=== Federal representative and first term as mayor ===
In 2000, the DSS joined the Democratic Opposition of Serbia (Demokratska opozicija Srbije, DOS), a broad and ideologically diverse coalition of parties opposed to the rule of Slobodan Milošević and his allies. DOS candidate Vojislav Koštunica defeated Milošević in the 2000 Yugoslavian presidential election, a watershed moment in Serbian and Yugoslavian politics. In the concurrent Yugoslavian parliamentary election, Jovašević appeared in the lead position on the DOS's list for the Kraljevo division and was elected when the list won two of three available seats. The DOS afterward formed a coalition government with the Socialist People's Party of Montenegro (Socijalistička narodna partija Crne Gore, SNP), and Jovašević initially served as a supporter of the administration.

Jovašević was also elected to the Kraljevo municipal assembly in the 2000 Serbian local elections, which took place at the same time the federal election. The DOS won a majority victory, and Jovašević was chosen as president of the assembly, a position that was at the time equivalent to mayor. He had little practical authority in this role, however, as most important municipal positions were held by members of the DS, the other major party in the DOS coalition.

The DSS withdrew support from Serbia's DOS government in 2001 and left the alliance entirely in 2002. In July 2002, Jovašević accused recently dismissed military official Nebojša Pavković of misusing a multi-million dollar fund for military hospitals and of having connections to a cigarette smuggling ring. Pavković, who denied the accusation and initiated legal charges against Jovašević, had been considered as a supporter of DS leader Zoran Đinđić, and the accusations contributed to ongoing divisions between the DS and DSS.

The Federal Republic of Yugoslavia was formally reconstituted as the State Union of Serbia and Montenegro in February 2003, and the Assembly of Serbia and Montenegro was established as its legislative branch. The first members of this body were chosen by indirect election from the republican parliaments of Serbia and Montenegro, with each parliamentary group allowed representation proportional to its numbers. Only sitting members of the Serbian assembly or the Montenegrin assembly, or members of the Federal Assembly of Yugoslavia at the time of the country's reconstitution, were eligible to serve. The DSS was permitted seventeen members in the federal assembly, and Jovašević was included in the party's delegation. On 23 June 2003, he was also chosen as part of Serbia and Montenegro's delegation to the Parliamentary Assembly of the Council of Europe (PACE).

At the municipal level, Jovašević was no longer supported by a majority of the delegates in Kraljevo's assembly by mid-2003, and the local government had become unstable. In July 2003, the Serbian government dissolved the assembly and dismissed Jovašević from office, calling a new election for November. By this time, Serbia had introduced the direct election of mayors; Jovašević ran as the DSS's candidate and was defeated in the second round by Radoslav Jović of the Serbian Renewal Movement (Srpski pokret obnove, SPO).

Jovašević appeared in the nineteenth position on the DSS's list in the 2003 Serbian parliamentary election and was awarded a mandate in the republican assembly when the list won fifty-three seats. (From 2000 to 2011, Serbian parliamentary mandates were awarded to candidates on successful lists at the discretion of the sponsoring parties or coalitions, and it was common practice for the mandates to be assigned out of numerical order. Jovašević was not automatically elected by virtue of his list position.) His term was in any event brief; he was appointed to a new term in the federal parliament on 12 February 2004 and was required to give up his seat in the national assembly. He was also re-appointed to the PACE in April 2004. During his time in the PACE, he was at different times the president of the bioethics committee, the vice-president of the legal and political committee, and a member of the foreign policy committee.

=== Administrator of the Raška District ===
The Serbian government gave Jovašević additional responsibilities as administrator of the Raška District in September 2005. In this capacity, he oversaw the territory during the 2006 Montenegrin independence referendum and supported prominent Sandžak politician Bajram Omeragić's call for Bosniaks in Montenegro to vote against independence. This effort was ultimately unsuccessful; the independence option won the election with the support of most Bosniaks in the country.

The federal assembly ceased to exist after Montenegro's declaration of independence in June 2006, and Jovašević's parliamentary tenure came to an end. He appeared in the seventy-third position on a combined Democratic Party of Serbia–New Serbia (Nova Srbija, NS) list in the 2007 Serbian parliamentary election and did not receive a mandate when the list won forty-seven seats. His term as head of the Raška District ended in August 2007.

=== Leader of the Movement for Kraljevo ===
Jovašević left the DSS in September 2007 and formed the local Movement for Kraljevo party the following month. In December 2007, five former Serbian Radical Party (Srpska radikalna stranka, SRS) delegates and one former DSS delegate in the municipal assembly joined the party, giving it official status.

Serbia abolished the direct election of mayors with the 2008 Serbian local elections; since this time, mayors in Serbia have been chosen by the elected delegates of municipal assemblies. Jovašević appeared in the lead position on the Movement for Kraljevo's list for this cycle and was re-elected to the assembly when the list won six seats. In March 2009, the Movement for Kraljevo became a part of the city's coalition government, and Jovašević was chosen as the city's deputy mayor.

=== Leader of the PULS ===
Jovašević brought the Movement for Kraljevo into a new local coalition called PULS Serbia in early 2010.

He was chosen for a second term as mayor of Kraljevo under unusual circumstances in April 2010, when some elected delegates were controversially replaced immediately before the election of the city's new coalition government. Perhaps unsurprisingly, the new administration was not stable; the former administration of local DS leader Ljubiša Simović did not accept the legitimacy of Jovašević's election, and a period followed in which both Simović and Jovašević claimed the mayoralty. The Serbian government ruled in Simović's favour, and the controversy was largely resolved by the end of July 2010; Jovašević continued to claim that he was the city's legitimate mayor, but he no longer held practical authority.

Serbia's electoral system was reformed in 2011, such that all mandates were assigned in numerical order to candidates on successful lists. Jovašević appeared in the lead position on PULS Serbia's list in Kraljevo and was re-elected when the list won five mandates. The party served in opposition after the election.

In 2015, Jovašević brought the PULS into the "Patriotic Bloc" coalition led by the Democratic Party of Serbia and Dveri at the republican level. He subsequently withdrew from the coalition, however, and intended to appear on a list led by Danica Grujičić in the 2016 Serbian parliamentary election. The list was ultimately not approved by the country's election commission. He again appeared in the lead position on PULS Serbia's list in the concurrent 2016 local elections in Kraljevo and was not re-elected when the list fell below the electoral threshold.

Jovašević voluntarily gave up control over PULS Serbia in July 2018 and allowed Aleksandar Šapić to take over the party, which was promptly reconstituted as the Serbian Patriotic Alliance (Srpski patriotski savez, SPAS). This arrangement allowed Šapić to forgo the usual, somewhat complicated process of party registration.

=== Since 2018 ===
For the 2020 Serbian local elections, Jovašević brought his local political movement into an alliance with New Serbia. He led the alliance's list in Kraljevo and was not elected when the list again fell below the threshold.

== Electoral record ==
=== Local (Kraljevo) ===
2003 Municipality of Kraljevo local election: Mayor of Kraljevo
Candidate	Party	First round		Second round	
Candidate	Party	Votes	%	Votes	%
Dr. Radoslav Jović	Serbian Renewal Movement	10,514	22.34	17,230	58.99
Dr. Ljubiša Jovašević	Democratic Party of Serbia–People's Democratic Party–Vojislav Koštunica	7,618	16.19	11,978	41.01
Miroslav Karapandžić	Citizens' Group: For Kraljevo	5,542	11.78		
Zvonko Obradović	G17 Plus	5,204	11.06		
Slobodan Mihajlović	Democratic Party	5,192	11.03		
Miljko Četrović	Serbian Radical Party	4,375	9.30		
Sreten Jovanović	Socialist Party of Serbia	3,079	6.54		
Prof. Dr. Predrag Stojanović Peđa	Christian Democratic Party of Serbia	2,607	5.54		
Zoran Jovanović	People's Party and "Revival of Serbia"	1,772	3.77		
Stamenka Arsić	Liberals of Serbia and Democratic Centre	1,152	2.45		
Total		47,055	100.00	29,208	100.00
Valid votes		47,055	96.96	29,208	98.15
Invalid/blank votes		1,477	3.04	550	1.85
Total votes		48,532	100.00	29,758	100.00
Registered voters/turnout		101,521	47.80	101,521	29.31
