= Zvonko Obradović =

Serbian politician

Zvonko Obradović (Serbian Cyrillic: Звонко Обрадовић; born 17 November 1966) is a Serbian politician and administrator. He served in the Assembly of Serbia and Montenegro from 2004 to 2006 as a member of G17 Plus and was the director of the Serbian Business Registers Agency from 2007 to 2019.

== Early life and career ==
Obranović was born in Kraljevo, in what was then the Socialist Republic of Serbia in the Socialist Federal Republic of Yugoslavia. He was raised in the community, graduated from the University of Kragujevac Faculty of Law in 1992, and passed the bar exam in 1994. He worked in the field of law 1992 to 1997.

== Politician ==
Obradović was an opponent of Slobodan Milošević's administration in 1990s. The opposition Together (Serbian: Zajedno) coalition won a majority victory in Kraljevo in the 1996 Serbian local elections and took office in early 1997. Obradović was appointed as president of the municipal assembly's executive board and served in this role until 2000. From 2001 to 2003, he was an expert consultant at the Steinbeis Foundation in Stuttgart, promoting the establishment of knowledge and technology transfer centers in Serbia and Germany.

He was the party's candidate for mayor of Kraljevo in a special off-year election in November 2003 and finished fourth against Radoslav Jović of the Serbian Renewal Movement (Srpski pokret obnove, SPO).

The following month, he appeared in the 161st position on G17 Plus's electoral list for the 2003 Serbian parliamentary election. The list won thirty-four seats, and he was included in the party's delegation when the national assembly convened in January 2004. (From 2000 to 2011, Serbian parliamentary mandates were awarded to candidates on successful lists at the discretion of the sponsoring parties or coalitions, and it was common practice for the mandates to be assigned out of numerical order. Obradović's specific list position had no bearing on his chances of election.) His term in this body was brief; on 12 February 2004, he was chosen as part of G17 Plus's delegation to the federal assembly of Serbia and Montenegro and so resigned from the republican parliament.

During his term in the federal parliament, Obradović served on the security services control committee and the committee for harmonizing the laws of the member states with the Constitutional Charter of Serbia and Montenegro. He was also a member of Serbia and Montenegro's delegation to the NATO Parliamentary Assembly (where Serbia and Montenegro had associate member status).

Jović resigned as mayor of Kraljevo in November 2005, and a by-election to choose his replacement was called for February 2006. Obradović again ran as G17 Plus's candidate and again finished in fourth place. His term in the federal assembly ended in June 2006, when Montenegro declared independence.

Obradović was a state secretary in Serbia's ministry of defence from 2006 to 2007. He appeared in the 173rd position on G17 Plus's list in the 2007 Serbian parliamentary election and was not given a new mandate when the list fell to nineteen seats.

== Director of the Serbian Business Registers Agency ==
Obradović was chosen as director of the Serbian Business Registers Agency (SBRA) in a public competition in 2007. Later in the same year, he announced that the agency was creating a "one-stop registration system" to streamline the process for new companies. He introduced the first tourism registry in Serbia in 2010, in the form of an online database covering the country's tourism resources.

In a 2014 interview, Obradović drew attention to the problem of directors leaving old companies bankrupt with dormant accounts and switching their assets to new companies. He announced a project called the "Registry of Disqualified Persons" to target this practice and urged the Serbian government to strengthen the legal framework.

The SBRA was one of Serbia's best-rated agencies during Obradović's tenure as director. His term ended in March 2019.

== Electoral record ==
=== Local (Kraljevo) ===
2006 Municipality of Kraljevo local by-election: Mayor of Kraljevo
| Candidate | Party | First round | | Second round | |
| Candidate | Party | Votes | % | Votes | % |
|---|---|---|---|---|---|
| Dr. Miloš Babić | New Serbia–Velimir Ilić | 14,509 | 42.07 | 20,068 | 76.84 |
| Miljko Četrović | Serbian Radical Party | 5,477 | 15.88 | 6,048 | 23.16 |
| Slobodan Mihajlović | Democratic Party–Boris Tadić | 3,658 | 10.61 | | |
| Zvonko Obradović | G17 Plus | 2,947 | 8.54 | | |
| Mirko Vuković | Serbian Renewal Movement | 2,674 | 7.75 | | |
| Prof. Dr. Dragoslav Kočović | Socialist Party of Serbia | 1,713 | 4.97 | | |
| Đorđe Pavlović | Strength of Serbia Movement–Bogoljub Karić | 1,622 | 4.70 | | |
| Dr. Zoran Miljković | Citizens' Group: Movement: Kraljevo Above All | 1,336 | 3.87 | | |
| Zoran Jovanović | People's Party | 553 | 1.60 | | |
| Total | | 34,489 | 100.00 | 26,116 | 100.00 |
| Valid votes | | 34,489 | 98.51 | 26,116 | 98.46 |
| Invalid/blank votes | | 523 | 1.49 | 409 | 1.54 |
| Total votes | | 35,012 | 100.00 | 26,525 | 100.00 |
| Registered voters/turnout | | 102,152 | 34.27 | 102,152 | 25.97 |

2003 Municipality of Kraljevo local election: Mayor of Kraljevo
| Candidate | Party | First round | | Second round | |
| Candidate | Party | Votes | % | Votes | % |
|---|---|---|---|---|---|
| Dr. Radoslav Jović | Serbian Renewal Movement | 10,514 | 22.34 | 17,230 | 58.99 |
| Dr. Ljubiša Jovašević | Democratic Party of Serbia–People's Democratic Party–Vojislav Koštunica | 7,618 | 16.19 | 11,978 | 41.01 |
| Miroslav Karapandžić | Citizens' Group: For Kraljevo | 5,542 | 11.78 | | |
| Zvonko Obradović | G17 Plus | 5,204 | 11.06 | | |
| Slobodan Mihajlović | Democratic Party | 5,192 | 11.03 | | |
| Miljko Četrović | Serbian Radical Party | 4,375 | 9.30 | | |
| Sreten Jovanović | Socialist Party of Serbia | 3,079 | 6.54 | | |
| Prof. Dr. Predrag Stojanović Peđa | Christian Democratic Party of Serbia | 2,607 | 5.54 | | |
| Zoran Jovanović | People's Party and "Revival of Serbia" | 1,772 | 3.77 | | |
| Stamenka Arsić | Liberals of Serbia and Democratic Centre | 1,152 | 2.45 | | |
| Total | | 47,055 | 100.00 | 29,208 | 100.00 |
| Valid votes | | 47,055 | 96.96 | 29,208 | 98.15 |
| Invalid/blank votes | | 1,477 | 3.04 | 550 | 1.85 |
| Total votes | | 48,532 | 100.00 | 29,758 | 100.00 |
| Registered voters/turnout | | 101,521 | 47.80 | 101,521 | 29.31 |
