= Miljko Četrović =

Serbian politician

Miljko Četrović (Serbian Cyrillic: Миљко Четровић; born 4 November 1949) is a Serbian former politician. He served in the National Assembly of Serbia from 2004 to 2007 as a member of the far-right Serbian Radical Party (Srpska radikalna stranka, SRS).

== Early life and career ==
Četrović was born in Kraljevo, in what was then the People's Republic of Serbia in the Federal People's Republic of Yugoslavia. He graduated from the University of Belgrade Faculty of Law in 1973.

== Politician ==
=== Early years (2000–03) ===
Četrović became president of the Radical Party's Kraljevo board and appeared in the lead position on its electoral list for the Kraljevo division in the 2000 Yugoslavian parliamentary election. The list did not win any seats. Četrović was also the SRS's candidate in Kraljevo's fortieth division for the concurrent 2000 Serbian local elections and, like all Radical Party candidates in Kraljevo during this cycle, was defeated.

The 2000 Yugoslavian elections saw the defeat of incumbent president Slobodan Milošević, a watershed moment in Serbian and Yugoslavian politics. The Serbian government fell after the Yugoslavian vote, and a new Serbian parliamentary election was held in December 2000. Serbia's electoral laws were reformed prior to the election, such that the entire country became a single division and all mandates were awarded to candidates on successful lists at the discretion of the sponsoring parties and coalitions, irrespective of numerical order. Četrović appeared in the eighty-fifth position on the Radical Party's list and was not given a mandate when the list won twenty-three seats.

Kraljevo held early local elections in 2003. By this time, Serbia had introduced both the direct election of mayors and proportional representation for local assembly elections. Četrović ran as the SRS's mayoral candidate and was defeated in the first round; he was, however, elected to the municipal assembly when the party's list won thirteen seats.

=== Parliamentarian (2003–07) ===
Četrović appeared in the fifty-sixth position on the Radical Party's list in the 2003 Serbian parliamentary election and was this time included in his party's delegation when the list won eighty-two mandates. He took his seat when the assembly met in January 2004. Although the Radicals were the largest party in this sitting of the legislature, they fell well short of a majority and ultimately served in opposition. This notwithstanding, Četrović was chosen in February 2004 as president of the assembly committee for relations with Serbs outside of Serbia. He also served on the finance committee and the privatization committee.

Četrović attempted to initiate a recall election against Kraljevo's sitting mayor Radoslav Jović in late 2005. Jović instead chose to resign from office, saying that he did not want to defend his position at the expense of taxpayers. A by-election was held to select his replacement in February 2006; Četrović ran as the Radical Party's candidate and was defeated in the second round of voting.

In November 2006, Četrović left the Radical Party's caucus in the municipal assembly and formed a new a group called the "Free Radicals." He indicated that his decision was rooted in "irreconcilable differences" with Vjerica Radeta, the Radical Party's leader for the Raška District, whom he charged with using "lies, fraud and nonsense" to interfere with the work of SRS municipal board. He did not appear on the SRS's list in the 2007 Serbian parliamentary election and his term in the national assembly ended in that year. He was also not re-elected to the Kraljevo assembly in the 2008 local elections and appears to have withdrawn from public life after this time.

== Electoral record ==
=== Local (Kraljevo) ===
2006 Municipality of Kraljevo local by-election: Mayor of Kraljevo
Candidate	Party	First round		Second round	
Candidate	Party	Votes	%	Votes	%
Dr. Miloš Babić	New Serbia–Velimir Ilić	14,509	42.07	20,068	76.84
Miljko Četrović	Serbian Radical Party	5,477	15.88	6,048	23.16
Slobodan Mihajlović	Democratic Party–Boris Tadić	3,658	10.61		
Zvonko Obradović	G17 Plus	2,947	8.54		
Mirko Vuković	Serbian Renewal Movement	2,674	7.75		
Prof. Dr. Dragoslav Kočović	Socialist Party of Serbia	1,713	4.97		
Đorđe Pavlović	Strength of Serbia Movement–Bogoljub Karić	1,622	4.70		
Dr. Zoran Miljković	Citizens' Group: Movement: Kraljevo Above All	1,336	3.87		
Zoran Jovanović	People's Party	553	1.60		
Total		34,489	100.00	26,116	100.00
Valid votes		34,489	98.51	26,116	98.46
Invalid/blank votes		523	1.49	409	1.54
Total votes		35,012	100.00	26,525	100.00
Registered voters/turnout		102,152	34.27	102,152	25.97

2003 Municipality of Kraljevo local election: Mayor of Kraljevo
Candidate	Party	First round		Second round	
Candidate	Party	Votes	%	Votes	%
Dr. Radoslav Jović	Serbian Renewal Movement	10,514	22.34	17,230	58.99
Dr. Ljubiša Jovašević	Democratic Party of Serbia–People's Democratic Party–Vojislav Koštunica	7,618	16.19	11,978	41.01
Miroslav Karapandžić	Citizens' Group: For Kraljevo	5,542	11.78		
Zvonko Obradović	G17 Plus	5,204	11.06		
Slobodan Mihajlović	Democratic Party	5,192	11.03		
Miljko Četrović	Serbian Radical Party	4,375	9.30		
Sreten Jovanović	Socialist Party of Serbia	3,079	6.54		
Prof. Dr. Predrag Stojanović Peđa	Christian Democratic Party of Serbia	2,607	5.54		
Zoran Jovanović	People's Party and "Revival of Serbia"	1,772	3.77		
Stamenka Arsić	Liberals of Serbia and Democratic Centre	1,152	2.45		
Total		47,055	100.00	29,208	100.00
Valid votes		47,055	96.96	29,208	98.15
Invalid/blank votes		1,477	3.04	550	1.85
Total votes		48,532	100.00	29,758	100.00
Registered voters/turnout		101,521	47.80	101,521	29.31
