= Conservatism in Serbia =

This article gives an overview of conservatism in Serbia (Serbian: Конзервативизам). It is limited to conservative parties with substantial support, mainly proved by having had a representation in parliament. The sign ⇒ means a reference to another party in that scheme. For inclusion in this scheme it is not necessary so that parties labeled themselves as a conservative party.

== Introduction ==
Conservatism has been a major force in Serbia since the 19th century.

== Timeline ==
=== From Constitutionalists to Progressives ===
- 1838: The Defenders of the Constitution (Ustavobranitelji) emerged as a political movement. They defend the 1838 Turkish Constitution and are against the autocratic rule of Miloš Obrenović I of Serbia.
- 1861: The Conservative Party is formed, emphasising the greater power of the Royal Council over the National Assembly. The Party supports Mihailo Obrenović III of Serbia.
- 1881: Serbian Progressive Party (Srpska napredna stranka) is formed. The Party is liberal conservative and carries the slogan ‘Law, Liberty, Progress’.
- 1914: A faction seceded as the Conservative Party (Konzervativna stranka), which supports a standing army, bicameral parliament and good ties with Austria-Hungary.
- 1919: The party merged into the Democratic Party (Demokratska stranka)

=== People's Radical Party ===
The People's Radical Party (Narodna radikalna stranka) was founded in 1881 as a radical party but from 1919 it evolved into a conservative direction

- 1935: A wing seceded as the ⇒ Yugoslav Radical Union
- 1945: The party is banned

=== Yugoslav Radical Union ===
- 1935: A wing seceded from the ⇒ People's Radical Party and constituted the Yugoslav Radical Union (Jugoslovenska radikalna zajednica)
- 1941: The party ceased to exist

=== Yugoslav National Movement ===
- 1935: Yugoslav National Movement (Jugoslovenski narodni pokret Zbor)

=== Serbian Renewal Movement ===
- 1990: Serbian Renewal Movement (Srpski pokret obnove) is founded
- 1997: A faction and in 1998 formed New Serbia (Nova Srbija)
- 2005: A group seceded as the Serbian Democratic Renewal Movement (Srpski demokratski pokret obnove)

=== Democratic Party of Serbia ===
- Democratic Party of Serbia was formed as a conservative split from the Democratic Party (DS) in 1992, and has played a key role in the opposition during the 1990s. It was a part of the "Together" coalition and was later a founding member of the Democratic Opposition of Serbia (DOS).
- 1997: A faction seceded as the Democratic Christian Party of Serbia ( Demohrišćanska stranka Srbije )
- Its first leader, Vojislav Koštunica, was elected president of Yugoslavia in 2000, a role which he served until 2003.
- In the 2003 parliamentary election, the DSS won 17.7% of the popular vote, translating into 53 seats in the parliament. Of these 53 seats, three went to the People's Democratic Party (NDS), one to the Serbian Liberal Party and one to the Serbian Democratic Party (SDS). After the election DSS managed to form minority government and Koštunica became Prime Minister of Serbia
- 2004: The ⇒ People's Democratic Party merged into the Democratic Party of Serbia
- In the 2007 parliamentary election, DSS won 47 seats in coalition with New Serbia receiving 667,615 votes or 16.55% of the total popular vote. DSS itself received 33 seats in the parliament they formed the coalition government with DS and G17 Plus with Koštunica retaining his position as Prime Minister of Serbia
- In the early 2008 parliamentary election held in May 2008 following the self-proclaimed declaration of independence by the Serbian province of Kosovo, the DSS won 30 seats in the National Assembly in coalition with New Serbia. It won 480,987 votes representing 11.62% of the electorate. In coalition with New Serbia 2008–10, it formed the second largest opposition block in the Serbian parliament
- The party competed independently in the 2012 parliamentary elections in May 2012 and received around 7% of the popular vote (273,532 votes) translating into 21 Members of Parliament.
- In the aftermath of 2014 parliamentary elections party failed to pass the electoral threshold and for the first time in its history it failed to enter parliament
- In 2014 Sanda Rašković Ivić was elected president
- In 2014, founder and first president of DSS Vojislav Koštunica left the party over its abandonment of the idea of political neutrality
- They participated in the 2016 parliamentary elections in the coalition with Dveri and received 5.04 percentage of the vote returning to parliament and gaining 6 seats
- Sanda Rašković Ivić party president was expelled from party membership in 2016 after which Miloš Jovanović was elected president
- DSS candidate in for president in 2017 presidential election was Aleksandar Popović who ended up gaining just around 1% of the popular vote (38,167 votes)
- DSS participated in the 2020 parliamentary elections and failed to pass the electoral threshold winning 2.24% of the popular vote (72,085 votes)
- On 26 January 2021, DSS and the Movement for the Restoration of the Kingdom of Serbia (POKS) signed an agreement on joint action and agreed on a joint political-program platform called the National-Democratic Alternative. In early May, the National-Democratic Alternative was transformed into a pre-electoral coalition

=== New Serbia ===
- It was established in 1998 by a group of dissidents led by Velimir Ilić from the Serbian Renewal Movement (SPO).
- New Serbia was part of the Democratic Opposition of Serbia (DOS) bloc which defeated Slobodan Milošević in the 2000 presidential election.
- The party took part in the 2003 parliamentary election in coalition with the Serbian Renewal Movement. The coalition received 7.7% of the popular vote and 22 seats; 9 seats were allocated to New Serbia.
- New Serbia ran in the 2007 election in coalition with the Democratic Party of Serbia (DSS) and United Serbia (JS). The coalition received 16.55% of the popular vote and 47 seats in parliament, 10 of which went to New Serbia.
- The party ran again in coalition with the DSS a year later in the 2008 election, receiving 11.62% of votes and 30 seats, with 9 allocated to NS.
- New Serbia ran in the 2014 election in coalition with the Serbian Progressive Party (SNS) and several other parties. The coalition received 48.2% of the popular vote and 158 seats in parliament, 6 of which went to New Serbia.
- New Serbia ran in the 2016 election in coalition with the Serbian Progressive Party (SNS) and several other parties. The coalition received 48.2% of the popular vote and 131 seats in parliament, 5 of which went to New Serbia.
- Party went into opposition in 2017 and supported Vuk Jeremić in 2017 presidential election
- In 2020 parliamentary election party ran in coalition with People's Freedom Movement and won less than 1% of the popular vote (7,873 votes)

=== Movement for Democratic Serbia ===
- 1999: The Movement for Democratic Serbia (Pokret za demokratsku Srbiju) is formed
- 2001: A faction seceded as the People's Democratic Party (Narodna demokratska stranka)

=== People’s Democratic Party ===
- 2001: A faction seceded from the Movement for Democratic Serbia and formed the People's Democratic Party (Narodna demokratska stranka)
- 2004: The party merged into the ⇒ Democratic Party of Serbia

=== G17 Plus ===
- G17 Plus was founded in 1997 as a non-governmental organization (NGO) in Serbia, then a federal unit within FR Yugoslavia. The organization consisting of economic experts enjoyed financial support of the United States through the National Endowment for Democracy (NED).
- The organization was registered as a political party on 15 December 2002, with Miroljub Labus as its first president.
- At its first electoral showing at the 2003 parliamentary elections, G17 Plus received 11.5% of the popular vote and 34 seats in the National Assembly.
- In March 2004, G17+ formed a coalition government with the Democratic Party of Serbia (DSS), the Serbian Renewal Movement (SPO) and New Serbia (NS).
- In May 2006 Miroljub Labus resigned as party leader and was replaced by Mlađan Dinkić. On October 1, 2006, the party quit the governing coalition over its failure to find and extradite ICTY fugitive Ratko Mladić.
- In the 2007 elections, the party received 6.82% of the popular vote and 19 seats in the parliament and formed the government with DS and DSS
- In the 2008 elections, the party ran in the coalition For a European Serbia led by Democratic Party, coalition ended up winning around 38% of the popular vote (1,590,200 votes) and 102 seats in the parliament of which 24 went to G17. Party once again entered government when it was formed between DS led coalition of which G17 was member of and coalition led by SPS
- In 2010, G17 Plus founded the United Regions of Serbia (URS), a coalition of political parties and groups emphasizing decentralization and regional development of Serbia.
- In the 2012 elections, party ran in the United Regions of Serbia coalition and ended up winning around 5.5% of the popular vote (215,666) and 16 seats in the parliament 10 of which went to G17. Once again G17 entered the government this time it was formed with SNS led coalition and SPS led coalition
- In April 2013 G17 Plus fully merged with URS, transforming it into a political party.
- On 31 July 2013 the URS was ousted from the government and became opposition
- In the 2014 elections URS won just around 3% of the popular vote (109,167 votes) and failed to enter parliament for the first time in its history
- On 13 November 2015 the party was removed from the register of political parties and ceased to exist, which was controversial because the party had over a million euros of unpaid debt. It had already been defunct for more than a year, according to the former president Mlađan Dinkić

=== Dveri ===
- Dveri were founded by Branimir Nešić in 1999 as a Christian right-wing youth organisation consisting mainly of students from the University of Belgrade which regularly arranged public debates devoted to the popularisation of clerical-nationalist philosophy of Nikolaj Velimirović, a bishop of the Serbian Orthodox Church who was canonized in 2003.
- In March 2012 the movement collected 14,507 signatures to register as an electoral list for the May 2012 Serbian parliamentary election. The Dveri Movement received 4.35% of the popular vote, failing to pass the 5% minimum threshold to enter parliament.
- Dveri again ran alone in the March 2014 Serbian parliamentary election, winning 3.58% of the vote, failing again to pass the 5% minimum threshold to enter parliament. They were characterized by many as a far-right party at this point of time
- In November 2014 Dveri and the Democratic Party of Serbia declared that they would contest the next elections as the "Patriotic Bloc" alliance. Parliamentary elections were held on 24 April 2016, in which the "Patriotic Bloc" won 5.04% of the vote (13 seats, of which Dveri had 7). After this election, for the first time in history, they became a parliamentary party.
- Dveri announced on 3 September 2016 that Boško Obradović, the president of Dveri, will be their candidate on the 2017 presidential election. On 10 March, Boško Obradović submitted his signatures for the candidacy to RIK. In the end, he only got 2.16% of the vote on the presidential election.
- In 2018 they were one of the founding members of the catch-all opposition Alliance for Serbia which boycotted the 2020 parliamentary election.

=== People's Party ===
- After his unsuccessful bid in an attempt to replace Ban Ki-Moon as UN Secretary-General in the end of 2016, Vuk Jeremić returned to Serbia, where he enjoyed relatively high approval ratings compared to other opposition politicians. He decided to run for president in 2017 presidential election, he finished fourth, with little less than 6% of the vote.
- In the aftermath of the election though his results were quite disappointing, he announced he will form a party. He gathered support for such move mainly from conservative intellectuals who were opposing Vučić's government and were previously tied with DSS (most notably Sanda Rašković-Ivić, a former DSS president). He formed the People's Party in October 2017. The People's Party was able to forgo the usual registration process for new parties when Miroslav Aleksić, a member of the National Assembly, allowed his People's Movement of Serbia to be re-registered and re-constituted under the new party name
- Since its inception the People's Party has positioned itself as an opposition party to the government, led by Serbian Progressive Party (SNS). Jeremić stated he is a pro-EU politician, but he opposes Serbia joining NATO

== Conservative leaders ==
- Ilija Garašanin
- Nikola Hristić
- Stojan Novaković
- Nikola Pašić
- Aca Stanojević
- Milan Stojadinović
- Vojislav Koštunica

== See also ==
- Politics of Serbia
- List of political parties in Serbia
