= Vasilije Pavićević =

Serbian politician (born 1946)

Vasilije Pavićević (Serbian Cyrillic: Василије Павићевић; born 11 May 1946) is a politician in Serbia. He served in the National Assembly of Serbia from 2001 to 2004 as a member of the Democratic Party of Serbia (Demokratska stranka Srbije, DSS).

== Private career ==
Pavićević is from Bajina Bašta and is a graduated electrical engineer. For a number of years, he was the director of Drinske Hidroelektrane.

== Politician ==
Pavićević appeared in the ninth position on the DSS's electoral list for the Užice district in the 1993 Serbian parliamentary election. He was not elected; the list won only one mandate in the division, which went to lead candidate Vladan Batić.

=== Parliamentarian ===
In 2000, the DSS joined the Democratic Opposition of Serbia (Demokratska opozicija Srbije, DOS), a broad and ideologically diverse coalition of parties opposed to Slobodan Milošević's administration. Pavićević was given the seventy-seventh position on the DOS's list in the 2000 Serbian parliamentary election and was awarded a mandate after the coalition won a landslide majority with 176 out of 250 seats. (For this election, the entire country was counted as a single electoral division and all mandates were distributed to candidates at the discretion of sponsoring parties or coalitions, irrespective of numerical order. Pavićević was not automatically elected by virtue of his list position, but he was included in his party's delegation all the same when the assembly convened in January 2001.)

The DSS left the DOS and moved to the opposition in 2002. The parliamentary mandates of several DSS members, including Pavićević, were nullified at the discretion of the DOS on 12 June 2002, although this decision was subsequently revoked and the mandates restored. During this period, the rival Democratic Party (Demokratska stranka, DS) specifically accused Pavićević and a number of other DSS delegates of holding up the work of parliament by refusing to attend its meetings.

Pavićević appeared in the ninety-eighth position on the DSS's list in the 2003 Serbian parliamentary election. The list won fifty-three mandates, and he was not given a new mandate; his term in parliament ended in early 2004. For the 2007 and 2008 Serbian parliamentary elections, the DSS ran a combined list with New Serbia (Nova Srbija, NS); Pavićević appeared on both lists but was not chosen for a mandate on either occasion.

=== Local politics ===
Pavićević has served a number of terms in the Bajina Bašta municipal assembly. He was elected to the assembly in the 2012 Serbian local elections, in which the DSS won six out of forty-five seats.

In 2014, Pavićević was one of a number of prominent DSS figures to leave the party. In the 2016 local elections, he led the electoral list of the "Democratic Party of Serbia Bajina Bašta," which may not have been endorsed by the main DSS organization, and was re-elected when the list won four seats.

Pavićević received the fourth position on the list of the Serbian People's Party (Srpska narodna partija, SNP) in the 2020 Serbian local elections. The list won only two seats, and he was not re-elected.
