= Radoslav Zdravković =

Serbian politician

Radoslav Zdravković (Serbian Cyrillic: Радослав Здравковић; born 1 June 1955) is a politician in Serbia. He served in the National Assembly of Serbia from 2004 to 2007 and was the deputy mayor of Rača on two occasions. During his time as an elected official, Zdravković was a member of the Democratic Party of Serbia (Demokratska stranka Srbije, DSS).

== Private career ==
Zdravković is a civil engineer.

== Politician ==
The DSS participated in the Democratic Opposition of Serbia (Demokratska opozicija Srbije, DOS) coalition in the 2000 Serbian local elections. In Rača, the DOS lost to the Serbian Renewal Movement (Srpski pokret obnove, SPO) but was nonetheless invited to participate in a local coalition government afterwards. Zdravković served as deputy mayor.

Zdravković appeared in the 125th position on the DSS's electoral list in the 2003 Serbian parliamentary election. The list won fifty-three mandates, and he was not initially included in his party's delegation. (From 2000 to 2011, mandates in Serbian parliamentary elections were awarded to successful parties or coalitions rather than individual candidates, and it was common practice for the mandates to be assigned out of numerical order. Zdravković's list position had no formal bearing on whether he received a mandate.)

Serbia introduced the direct election of mayors in the 2004 local elections; Zdravković was the DSS's candidate in Rača and finished in third place. He also led the DSS list in the concurrent municipal assembly election and was elected when the list won four mandates.

Zdravković was given a mandate in the national assembly on 18 November 2004 as the replacement for another DSS delegate. The DSS was the dominant power in Serbia's coalition government at the time, and he served as a supporter of the administration. During his parliamentary term, he was a member of the committee on relations with Serbs outside Serbia. He received the 113th position on a combined DSS–New Serbia (Nova Srbija, NS) list in the 2007 parliamentary election; the list won forty-seven seats, and he was not given a mandate for a second term.

The DSS and NS continued their alliance into the 2008 parliamentary election and won thirty mandates. Zdravković appeared in the 101st position and was again not included in the DSS delegation. He also appeared in the second position on the DSS–NS list in the concurrent 2008 local elections and took another local mandate when the list won nine seats, finishing in a tie for first place with the rival Democratic Party (Demokratska stranka, DS). The DSS participated in the local government afterward, and Zdravković was again chosen as the municipality's deputy mayor. He was dismissed from the position on 9 June 2010 and does not seem to have returned to political life since this time.

== Electoral record ==
=== Local (Rača) ===
2004 Municipality of Rača local election Mayor of Rača - First and Second Round Results
Candidate	Party or Coalition	Votes	%	Votes	%
Dragan Stevanović	Serbian Renewal Movement–Democratic Party (Affiliation: Democratic Party)	1,948	39.43	2,634	53.35
Dragan Mijatović Draganče	Socialist Party of Serbia–OO Rača	1,096	22.18	2,303	46.65
Radoslav Zdravković	Democratic Party of Serbia–Vojislav Koštunica	804	16.27		
Mileta Radovanović	Strength of Serbia Movement–Bogoljub Karić	460	9.31		
Verica Karić	Serbian Radical Party–Tomislav Nikolić	370	7.49		
Nebojša Pavlović	G17 Plus–Miroljub Labus	263	5.32		
Total valid votes		4,941	100	4,937	100
