= Vitomir Pijevac =

Serbian politician

Vitomir Pijevac (Note: Pijevac's name is often misspelled as "Vitomir Pjevac" in media reports. See for instance "Socijalisti se priklonili 'narodnjacima'", Danas, 11 July 2008, accessed 14 May 2026.) (Serbian Cyrillic: Витомир Пијевац; born 15 December 1944) is a Serbian former administrator and politician. He served in the assembly of the Federal Republic of Yugoslavia from 2000 to 2003 and has held high municipal office in Priboj. Pijevac is a member of the Socialist Party of Serbia (SPS).

== Private career ==
Pijevac holds a Master of Technical Sciences degree. For most of the 1990s, he was the general director of Fabrika automobila Priboj (FAP), a prominent employer in the municipality. He stood down from the role in October 2000, as part of a larger wave of changes in Serbia after the fall of Slobodan Milošević.

By the 2010s, Pijevac was the coordinator for small hydro power plants in Priboj.

== Politician ==
Pijevac credited the Socialist Party with maintaining peace between the Serb and Bosniak (Muslim) communities of Priboj when campaigning for the party in the repeated 1997 Serbian presidential election. He said, "In defending peace and communal life in these areas, the SPS brings together not only Serbs, but also many Muslims, without whose engagement and contribution we would not have succeeded in our efforts."

=== Federal parliamentarian (2000–03) ===
The Socialist Party of Serbia contested the 2000 Yugoslavian parliamentary election in an alliance with the Yugoslav Left (JUL). Pijevac appeared in the third position out of four on their combined electoral list for the federal assembly's Chamber of Citizens in the Užice division. The list won two seats, and he was awarded a mandate. (For this election, half of the assembly mandates were assigned to candidates on successful lists in numerical order and the other half at the discretion of the sponsoring parties or coalitions. Pijevac was given the list's "optional" mandate.) The Democratic Opposition of Serbia (DOS) won the election in Serbia and, after Milošević's fall from power on 5 October 2000, formed a coalition government with the Socialist People's Party of Montenegro (SNP CG). The Socialists served in opposition for the term that followed.

The Federal Republic Yugoslavia was restructured as the State Union of Serbia and Montenegro in early 2003. The new country had a unicameral parliament, whose first members were chosen by indirect election from the republican parliaments of Serbia and Montenegro; only sitting members of the republican parliaments and outgoing members of the old federal parliament were eligible to serve. By virtue of its standing in the Serbian parliament, the Socialist Party had the right to appoint twelve members. Pijevac was not included in his party's delegation, and his term in the federal assembly came to an end.

=== Republican and local politics (2003–08) ===
The Socialist Party's alliance had won the 2000 local elections in Priboj, but their administration fell in early 2002, and new local elections took place in the municipality in September and October 2003. Serbia had introduced direct mayoral elections the previous year, and Pijevac ran as the Socialist Party's mayoral candidate. He was defeated in the second round of voting by Milenko Milićević of the Democratic Party (DS). He did, however, receive a mandate in the concurrent municipal assembly election. The Socialists won eight seats in the assembly overall and, notwithstanding Milićević serving in the role of mayor, formed a local coalition government afterward with the far-right Serbian Radical Party (SRS) and the Democratic Party of Serbia (DSS).

Pijevac later appeared in the 182nd position on the Socialist Party's list in the 2003 Serbian parliamentary election, which took place on 28 December. The list won twenty-two seats, and he was not given a mandate. (From 2000 to 2011, all mandates in Serbian parliamentary elections were awarded to candidates on successful lists at the discretion of the sponsoring parties or coalitions, irrespective of numerical order. Pijevac's position on the list, which was in any event mostly alphabetical, had no specific bearing on his chances of election.)

Priboj is located on Serbia's border with Bosnia and Herzegovina, and the area was directly affected by the events of the Bosnian War from 1992 to 1995. On 22 October 1992, sixteen Serbian and Yugoslavian citizens of Bosniak ethnicity were kidnapped by members of Milan Lukić's "Avengers" militia from a bus travelling to Priboj through Bosnian Serb territory; they were later tortured and executed, an event known as the Sjeverin massacre. There have long been suggestions of Serbian state collusion in these events, and the matter remains contested in Serbia. In July 2004, Pijevac took part in a round table discussion in Priboj's Lim hotel that addressed the legacy of the Bosnian War in the area. In his comments, he stressed that "all Priboj citizens are neighbours regardless of name, religion, and nation," adding that this "has always been and should be, but that there are forces that do not like it." He also criticized the working language of the conference being described as "Bosnian–Croatian–Serbian," noting that the discussion was taking place on Serbian territory and there were "neither Croats nor Bosnians" in attendance. His comments caused a murmur of discontent among some other attendees. A relative of one of the victims openly asked Pijevac about "his role" in the massacre; he did not respond to the implied charge but said that it was necessary to establish the truth about the events. (Pijevac has never been charged with any involvement in the crime.)

Pijevac received the 179th position on the Socialist Party's list in the 2007 Serbian parliamentary election and was again not given a mandate when the party fell to sixteen seats. As in 2003, the list was mostly alphabetical.

=== Local official (2008–14) ===
The direct election of mayors proved to be a short-lived experiment and was abandoned with the 2008 local elections. In Priboj, an alliance of the SRS and DSS won a plurality victory in 2008 with thirteen seats, while a separate alliance of the Socialist Party and the Party of United Pensioners of Serbia (PUPS) won four. The SRS–DSS group subsequently formed a coalition government that included the Socialists, and Pijevac was chosen as assembly president. When the Radicals split later in 2008, the entire party leadership in Priboj joined the breakaway Serbian Progressive Party (SNS) and continued serving in government, still maintaining their alliance with the SPS. In September 2009, an article in Danas identified Pijevac as part of a "hardline" wing within the Socialist Party and noted that the assembly's opposition parties often accused him of being the person most responsible for the municipality's economic hardships.

The 2012 Serbian local elections resulted in an extremely divided assembly in Priboj, and the Progressives ultimately formed a broad coalition government that included several parties, including the Socialists. Pijevac received the third position on a joint SPS–PUPS list and was re-elected when the list won five seats; he resigned his assembly seat almost immediately, however, on being appointed to serve on the municipal council (i.e., the executive branch of the municipal government). He continued in this role until May 2014, when the local government was restructured.

== Electoral record ==
=== Local (Priboj) ===
2003 Priboj municipal election: Mayor of Priboj
Candidate	Party	First round		Second round	
Candidate	Party	Votes	%	Votes	%
Milenko Milićević	Together for Priboj (Democratic Party, Civic Alliance of Serbia, Liberals of Serbia) (Affiliation: Democratic Party)	4,572	39.80	5,360	54.72
Vitomir Pijevac	Socialist Party of Serbia	2,046	17.55	4,435	45.28
Bratislav Kojadinović	Serbian Renewal Movement–People's Party (Affiliation: Serbian Renewal Movement)	1,922	16.48		
other candidates					
Total				9,795	100.00
