= Dragan Nikolić (politician) =

Serbian politician (born 1960)

Dragan Nikolić (Serbian Cyrillic: Драган Николић; born 10 May 1960) is a Serbian politician. He served three terms in the National Assembly of Serbia between 1997 and 2016, initially as a member of the far-right Serbian Radical Party and later with the breakaway Serbian Progressive Party. He was re-elected to the National Assembly in 2022 as a member of the far-right Serbian Party Oathkeepers. He left the party in November 2023 and re-joined the Serbian Progressive Party.

== Private career ==
Nikolić is a lawyer based in Vranje. His most high-profile case took place between 2003 and 2006, when he represented a group of young men who accused Bishop Pahomije of Vranje of sexual offenses. (Pahomije was found not guilty, and although this verdict was subsequently annulled it was not possible to order a re-trial.)

== Politician ==
=== The Milošević years (1990–2000) ===
Nikolić contested the 1990 Serbian parliamentary election as a candidate of the People's Radical Party in Vranje's second constituency seat. He was not successful; the winning candidate was Vlajko Jović of the Socialist Party of Serbia.

The People's Radical Party merged with Vojislav Šešelj's Serbian Chetnik Movement in 1991 to create the Serbian Radical Party. Nikolić does not appear to have been a founding member of this party. He instead contested the 1992 Serbian parliamentary election (the first to be held under a system of proportional representation) as a candidate of the Democratic Movement of Serbia (Demokratski pokret Srbije, DEPOS) alliance, appearing in the third position on the DEPOS electoral list for Leskovac. The list won two mandates in the division. Under Serbia's electoral system at the time, one-third of mandates were awarded in numerical order while the other two-thirds were distributed to listed candidates at the discretion of the successful parties or alliances. Nikolić could have been awarded the second DEPOS mandate for the division, although he was not.

Nikolić subsequently joined the Serbian Radical Party and appeared in the third position on the party's list in Vranje for the 1997 parliamentary election. The party won three seats in the division, and Nikolić was this time awarded a mandate. The Radical Party initially served in opposition in this parliament, although it subsequently took part in a coalition government with the Socialist Party from 1998 to 2000, returning to opposition with the fall of Yugoslavian president Slobodan Milošević in October 2000.

=== Since 2000 ===
Serbia's election system was reformed for the 2000 Serbian parliamentary election: the entire country became a single electoral division with members elected by proportional representation, and all mandates were distributed to listed candidates at the discretion of successful parties and coalitions. Nikolić received the seventy-fourth position on the Radical Party's list. The party won twenty-three seats, and he was not selected for a mandate.

Nikolić subsequently disaffiliated from the Radical Party and contested the 2003 Serbian parliamentary election on the For National Unity coalition list in conjunction with the People's Peasant Party of Marijan Rističević (although he was not a party member). The list did not win any mandates. Nikolić joined New Serbia in 2006 and became a member of the Progressive Party in 2009. He held some local positions of leadership in the latter party and was known as an ally of Tomislav Nikolić.

The electoral system of Serbia was again reformed in 2011, such that mandates were awarded in numerical order to candidates on successful lists. Nikolić was given the seventy-third position on the Progressive Party's Let's Get Serbia Moving list in the 2012 parliamentary election and was elected to a second term when the list won exactly seventy-three seats. The Progressives subsequently formed a coalition government with the Socialist Party and other parties, and Nikolić served as part of the government's parliamentary majority. He received the sixty-eighth position on the successor Aleksandar Vučić — Future We Believe In list in the 2014 Serbian parliamentary election and was re-elected when the list won a landslide victory with 158 seats. During his third term, he was a member of the committee on constitutional issues and legislation and the committee on justice, state administration, and local self-government.

For the 2016 election, he received the 160th position on the Progressive Party's Aleksandar Vučić — Serbia Is Winning list. The list won 131 mandates, and on this occasion he was not returned.

Nikolić has also served a number of terms in the Vranje municipal assembly. He appeared in the lead position on the Progressive Party's list in the 2012 Serbian local elections. Following the election, the Progressives served in a local municipal government with the Socialists.
