= Marko Petrović =

Serbian politician (1952–2016)

Marko Petrović (Serbian Cyrillic: Марко Петровић; 13 May 1952 – 8 September 2016) was a Serbian politician. He served two terms in the National Assembly of Serbia between 1994 and 2004 and was the interim mayor of Kraljevo in 2003. Petrović was at different times a member of the Serbian Renewal Movement (Srpski pokret obnove, SPO) and New Serbia (Nova Srbija, NS).

== Private career ==
Petrović was a private entrepreneur.

== Politician ==
=== Serbian Renewal Movement ===
Petrović entered political life as a member of the SPO, which was the dominant party in the Democratic Movement of Serbia (Demokratski pokret Srbije, DEPOS) coalition in the early 1990s. He received the eleventh position on DEPOS's electoral list for the Kragujevac division in the 1993 Serbian parliamentary election; the list won seven seats, and he was not initially chosen to serve in the assembly. He was, however, awarded a mandate on 9 June 1994 as a replacement for Petar Jaraković. (From 1992 to 2000, Serbia's electoral law stipulated that one-third of parliamentary mandates would be assigned to candidates on successful lists in numerical order, while the remaining two-thirds would be distributed amongst other candidates at the discretion of sponsoring parties or coalitions. Petrović's list position did not determine whether or when he received a mandate.) The DEPOS coalition dissolved shortly after the election, and the SPO served in opposition. During this period, Serbian political life was dominated by the authoritarian rule of Socialist Party of Serbia (Socijalistička partija Srbije, SPS) leader Slobodan Milošević and his allies.

The SPO joined a new opposition coalition called Together (Zajedno) in late 1996. The coalition won victories in several major Serbian cities, including Kraljevo, in the 1996 Serbian local elections; the SPS-led regime initially refused to recognize the outcome, leading to extended protests across the country. Petrović played a prominent role in the Kraljevo protests, at one time taking part in a hunger strike. In January 1997, he was beaten by state police and taken into custody, notwithstanding that he had the right to parliamentary immunity. Amnesty International drew attention to his treatment in a report on events in the city. Ultimately, the regime recognized the opposition's victories in most major cities, including Kraljevo, via a lex specialis in February 1997.

The Zajedno coalition broke down later in the year, and the SPO contested the 1997 Serbian parliamentary election on its own. Petrović was given the fourth position on the party's list for the redistributed Kraljevo division and did not receive a new mandate when the list won two seats.

=== New Serbia ===
The SPO became increasingly cooperative with Serbia's SPS-led administration throughout 1997. This led to a party split, as several SPO members who opposed the party's direction coalesced around Velimir Ilić as the SPO-Zajendo group. The following year, Ilić created the New Serbia party. Petrović sided with Ilić and became one of New Serbia's vice-presidents. In 1999, after the Kosovo War and the NATO bombing of Yugoslavia, he took part in new protests against the Milošević administration.

In 2000, New Serbia joined the Democratic Opposition of Serbia (Demokratska opozicija Srbije, DOS), a broad and ideologically diverse coalition of parties opposed to Milošević's administration. DOS candidate Vojislav Koštunica defeated Milošević in the 2000 Yugoslavian presidential election, a watershed moment in Serbian and Yugoslavian politics. Serbia's government fell after the Yugoslavian election, and a new Serbian parliamentary election was called for December 2000. Prior to the vote, Serbia's electoral laws were changed such that the entire country became a single electoral division and all mandates were awarded to candidates on successful lists at the discretion of the sponsoring parties or coalitions, irrespective of numerical order. Petrović appeared in the eighth position on the DOS's list and was awarded a mandate when the list won a landslide victory with 176 out of 250 seats.

New Serbia initially provided outside support to Serbia's new DOS government. In July 2001, the party formed its own assembly group, and Petrović was chosen as the group's leader. In the same period, he played a leading role in negotiations, ultimately unsuccessful, for the party to join the government. The following year, New Serbia moved into opposition.

=== Independent ===
In December 2002, Petrović and two other New Serbia delegates went against the party's wishes and remained in the assembly on a critical budget motion, allowing the government to maintain quorum and win the vote. The three delegates were subsequently expelled from the party. In January 2003, they created a new assembly group called "Serbia" with two delegates from smaller parties previously aligned with the Party of Serbian Unity (Stranka srpskog jedinstva, SSJ). Petrović served as the group's leader. For technical reasons, he was still registered as a member of New Serbia in the national assembly for the remainder of his term.

The Federal Republic of Yugoslavia was formally reconstituted as the State Union of Serbia and Montenegro in February 2003, and the Assembly of Serbia and Montenegro was established as its legislative branch. The first members of this body were chosen by indirect election from the republican parliaments of Serbia and Montenegro, with each parliamentary group allowed representation proportional to its numbers. Only sitting members of the Serbian assembly or the Montenegrin assembly, or members of the Federal Assembly of Yugoslavia at the time of the country's reconstitution, were eligible to serve. The "Serbia" group was allotted one seat in the federal assembly, which was assigned to Petrović.

"Serbia" later broke up, and Petrović ceased to be a member of any assembly group. At the end of his national assembly term, he was the president of the committee for urban planning and construction and a member of the committee for inter-cultural relations and the committee for transport and communications. He was not a candidate in the 2003 parliamentary election, and his terms in the federal and republican assemblies ended in early 2004.

==== Interim mayor of Kraljevo ====
In July 2003, following a period of instability, the Serbian government dissolved the Kraljevo municipal assembly and called a new local election for November. Petrović was appointed as the leader of an interim municipal government. He was succeeded in this role at the end of the year by the newly elected mayor, Radoslav Jović.

== Death ==
Petrović died suddenly in Belgrade on 8 September 2016. He was buried two days later in Kraljevo.
