= Ladislav Tomić =

Serbian politician

Ladislav Tomić (Serbian Cyrillic: Ладислав Томић; born 1976) is a politician in Serbia, currently serving his third term in the Assembly of Vojvodina. Previously a member of other parties, he now serves with the Democratic Party of Serbia (Demokratska stranka Srbije, DSS).

== Private career ==
Tomić is a doctor of veterinary medicine. He lives in Kikinda.

== Politician ==
Tomić entered political life as a member of the far-right Serbian Radical Party. He was first elected to the Vojvodina assembly in the 2008 Vojvodina provincial election, winning Kikinda's first constituency seat in the second round. The election was won by the Democratic Party (Demokratska stranka, DS) and its allies, and the Radicals served in opposition. Tomić also appeared in the seventh position on the Radical Party's list for Kikinda in the 2008 Serbian local elections and was selected for a mandate when the list won seventeen mandates. (From 2000 to 2011, mandates in Serbian elections held under proportional representation were assigned to successful parties and coalitions rather than individual candidates, and it was common practice for the mandates to be assigned out of numerical order. Tomić did not automatically receive a mandate by virtue of his list position.)

The Radical Party experienced a serious split later in 2008, and several members formed the more moderate Serbian Progressive Party under the leadership of Tomislav Nikolić and Aleksandar Vučić. Tomić sided with the Progressives.

Serbia's electoral system was reformed in 2011, such that proportional mandates were awarded in numerical order to candidates on successful lists. Tomić did not seek re-election for a constituency seat in the 2012 provincial election but was instead given the eleventh position on the Progressive Party's proportional list and was re-elected when the list won fourteen seats. The DS and its allies again won the election, the Progressives served in opposition. At the municipal level, Tomić received the second position on the Progressive list for Kikinda in the 2012 local elections and was re-elected when the list won twelve mandates. He served as president of the Progressive board in Kikinda at this time.

Tomić resigned as president of the Kikinda Progressive board in November 2012, following a controversy in which another Progressive party member offered an appointment to a Social Democratic Party of Serbia delegate in return for bringing down the local DS-led government. The district leader of the Progressives accused Tomić of having acted incorrectly in the matter; Tomić said that he did not accept this criticism but that he had no choice but to resign under the circumstances. He subsequently served as an independent delegate and did not seek re-election at the provincial or local level in 2016.

Tomić later joined the DSS. He was given the fourth position on the party's METLA 2020 list in the 2020 provincial election and was elected when the list won five mandates. The Progressives and their allies won the election, and the DSS serves in opposition. Tomić is now a member of the assembly committee on petitions and motions and the committee on establishing equal authenticity of provincial legislation in languages in official use. He also led the DSS list in Kikinda and was re-elected to the municipal assembly when its list won a single mandate. He is a member of the DSS presidency at the republic level.

== Electoral record ==
=== Provincial (Vojvodina) ===
2008 Vojvodina assembly election Kikinda I (constituency seat) - First and Second Rounds
Ladislav Tomić	Serbian Radical Party	3,799	25.61	4,901	53.67
Dragan Strajnić	For a European Vojvodina: Democratic Party–G17 Plus, Boris Tadić	3,074	20.72	4,231	46.33
Stevan Grbić	Socialist Party of Serbia–Party of United Pensioners of Serbia	2,626	17.70		
Dušan Lujanov	Democratic Party of Serbia–New Serbia	1,434	9.67		
Imre Kabok	Hungarian Coalition–István Pásztor	1,182	7.97		
Ljiljana Krneta	Liberal Democratic Party	1,008	6.80		
Zoltan Moldvai	Coalition: Together for Vojvodina - Nenad Čanak	896	6.04		
Dušan Lujanov	Political Organization of the Movement KI - 39	814	5.49		
Total valid votes		14,833	100	9,132	100
Invalid ballots		769		190	
Total votes casts		15,602	60.98	9,322	36.40
