= 2003 Serbian presidential election =

- 16 November 2003
- Turnout: 38.79% (▼6.37 pp)
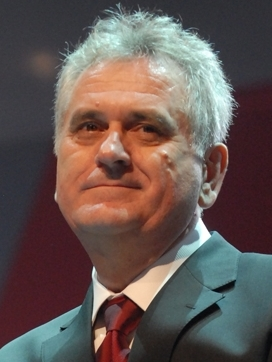

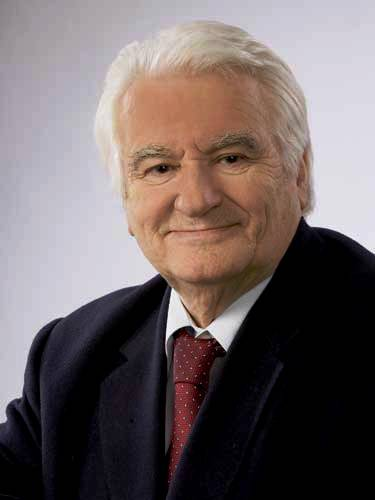
Candidate	Tomislav Nikolić	Dragoljub Mićunović
Party	SRS	DC
Alliance		DOS
Popular vote	1,166,896	893,906
Percentage	47.87%	36.67%
President before election
Nataša Mićić (acting)
GSS
Elected President
Election results annulled
Nataša Mićić (acting)
GSS

Presidential elections were held in Serbia on 16 November 2003, a month before the December 2003 parliamentary election. Although Tomislav Nikolić of the Serbian Radical Party received the most votes, the elections were invalidated as voter turnout was just 39%, less than the 50% threshold required by electoral law. As a result, fresh elections were held in June 2004.

Two days after the election, the Democratic Opposition of Serbia coalition was dissolved.

== Results ==
Candidate	Party	Votes	%
Tomislav Nikolić	Serbian Radical Party	1,166,896	47.87
Dragoljub Mićunović	Democratic Opposition of Serbia	893,906	36.67
Velimir Ilić	New Serbia	229,229	9.40
Marijan Rističević	People's Peasant Party	72,105	2.96
Dragan Tomić	Socialist People's Party	54,703	2.24
Radoslav Avlijaš	Democratic Fatherland Party	20,782	0.85
Total		2,437,621	100.00
Valid votes		2,437,621	96.58
Invalid/blank votes		86,268	3.42
Total votes		2,523,889	100.00
Registered voters/turnout		6,506,505	38.79
Source: Psephos
