= Đorđe Đukić (Vojvodina politician) =

Serbian politician (born 1948)

Đorđe Đukić (Serbian Cyrillic: Ђорђе Ђукић; born 1948) is a former politician in Serbia. He was the president of the executive council of Vojvodina (i.e., effectively the province's prime minister) from 2000 to 2004. He also served at different times in the Assembly of the Federal Republic of Yugoslavia, the National Assembly of Serbia, and the Assembly of Serbia and Montenegro, as well as being the mayor of Žabalj from 1996 to 2000. Originally a member of the Democratic Party (Demokratska stranka, DS), he joined the Liberal Democratic Party (Liberalno demokratska partija, LDP) following a split in 2005 and later affiliated with the United Regions of Serbia (Ujedinjeni regioni Srbije, URS).

== Early life and career ==
Đukić was born in the village of Gospođinci, Žabalj, Autonomous Province of Vojvodina, in what was then the People's Republic of Serbia in the Federal People's Republic of Yugoslavia. He graduated from technical high school in Novi Sad and worked at Jugoalat and at the Faculty of Agriculture in the Institute of Agricultural Engineering. In 1993, he became a private entrepreneur.

== Politician ==
=== Early candidacies ===
Đukić was elected to the Žabalj municipal assembly in the 1996 Serbian local elections as a candidate of Zajedno, a coalition of parties including the DS that was opposed to Slobodan Milošević's administration. Zajedno won a majority victory in Žabalj and Đukić was chosen as president of the local assembly, a position that was at the time equivalent to mayor. He served in this role for the next four years.

In 2000, the DS helped to create the Democratic Opposition of Serbia (DOS), a broad and ideologically diverse coalition of parties seeking the overthrow of Milošević's administration. DOS candidate Vojislav Koštunica defeated Milošević in the 2000 Yugoslavian presidential election, an event that caused large-scale changes in Serbian politics. Đukić received the lead position on the DOS's electoral list for the Vrbas division (which included Žabalj) in the concurrent election for the Yugoslavian parliament's Chamber of Citizens and was elected when the list won two of the area's three mandates.

=== President of the Vojvodina executive council ===
The DOS won a majority of seats in the 2000 Vojvodina provincial election, which was held at the same time as the Yugoslavian federal elections. Although he was not a candidate in the provincial election, Đukić was selected as the president of the province's executive council on 23 October 2000. In this role, he was a vocal proponent of increased autonomy for the province, saying in February 2001 that the province's levels of autonomy "must be significantly enlarged."

Early in his term, Đukić led the provincial executive in adopting what he described as "a letter of intent" for negotiations with the republican government on autonomy; the document covered the responsibilities of the assembly, the local executive, and the relevant provincial secretariats. The provincial assembly approved the executive's proposals on 29 March 2001, by a vote of eighty-six to ten with two abstentions; some delegates boycotted the proceedings.

In September 2001, Đukić said that a working group consisting of members of the provincial and republican governments had reached agreement on a law to restore Vojvodina's original levels of autonomy in the Serbian constitution, overriding restrictions that had been added in 1990 and 1994. Two months later, the working group announced that it had reached agreement on a list of "indisputable powers" to return to the province and that relevant legislation would come before parliament by the end of the year.

The regionalist Reformists of Vojvodina brought forward a non-confidence motion against Đukić in late 2001, arguing that he was insufficiently committed to provincial autonomy and too closely aligned with DS party interests in Belgrade. The party withdrew the motion before a vote.

Đukić's proposals for autonomy were opposed by the Democratic Party of Serbia (Demokratska stranka Srbije, DSS), which was initially one of the parties in the DOS coalition. The DSS was excluded from the provincial executive after a reshuffle in March 2002; Đukić justified this decision on the basis that members of the party had "not only refused to work on the passage of the omnibus law [on autonomy], they went so far as to deny the rest of the DOS members in the Vojvodina Assembly the right to do that."

In early 2003, Đukić led the Vojvodina executive in adopting a symbolic motion on co-operation with the International Criminal Tribunal for the former Yugoslavia (ICTY). (The ICTY did not have direct relations with the province.) Later in the year, he met with Republika Srpska prime minister Dragan Mikerević and announced an agreement for Vojvodina to open an office in Banja Luka for greater economic co-operation between the entities.

During discussions on the reform of Serbia's constitution in August 2003, Đukić called for Vojvodina and other regions of Serbia to receive greater economic independence. In March 2004, he dismissed calls for a moratorium on privatization in the province.

His term in office ended on 30 October 2004.

=== Republican and federal politics after 2000 ===
Đukić continued to serve in the Yugoslavian parliament's Chamber of Citizens after becoming president of the Vojvodina executive. In February 2003, the Federal Republic of Yugoslavia was restructured as the State Union of Serbia and Montenegro. The new state union had a unicameral assembly, the members of which were chosen by the republican assemblies of Serbia and Montenegro; only members of the republican parliaments and the previous federal assembly were eligible to serve. On 25 February 2003, Đukić was selected as part of the DS's delegation to the new body.

Đukić appeared in the nineteenth position on the DS's electoral list in the 2003 Serbian parliamentary election. The list won thirty-seven mandates, and he was chosen to serve in the DS's delegation when the new assembly met in January 2004. (From 2000 to 2011, all parliamentary mandates were awarded to sponsoring parties or coalitions rather than to individual candidates, and it was common practice for the mandates to be distributed out of numerical order. Đukić did not automatically receive a mandate by virtue of his list position, but he was nonetheless chosen as a Democratic Party representative.) His term in the national assembly was brief; he resigned on 12 February 2004, after being appointed to a new term in the federal assembly of Serbia and Montenegro.

Following a party split in 2005, Đukić joined Čedomir Jovanović's LDP and served on the party's presidency. He was the LDP's only member in the federal assembly. The State Union of Serbian and Montenegro ceased to exist in 2006 when Montenegro declared independence.

Đukić appeared on the LDP's electoral lists in the 2007 and 2008 Serbian parliamentary elections, although he did not take a mandate in the assembly on either occasion. He also appeared on the party's list for the Assembly of Vojvodina in the 2008 provincial election. The list did not cross the electoral threshold to win any mandates in the provincial assembly.

After withdrawing from politics for a time, Đukić re-emerged in 2013 as the provincial leader of the URS in Vojvodina. He appeared in the 104th position on the party's list in the 2014 Serbian parliamentary election. This list, too, failed to cross the relevant electoral threshold. The party dissolved the following year.
