= Olgica Batić =

Serbian lawyer and politician

Olgica Batić Олгица Батић
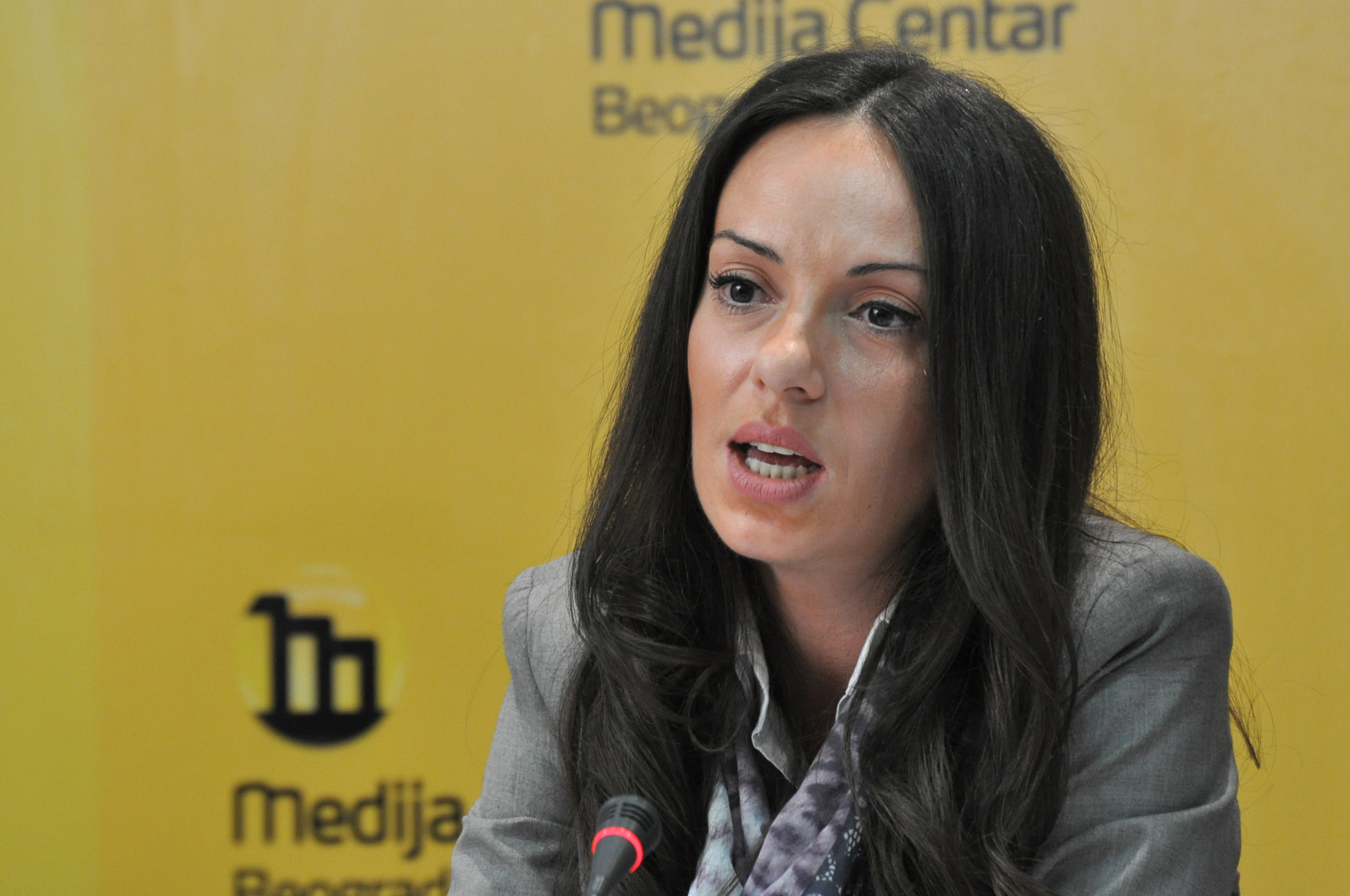

Personal details
- Born: 7 December 1981 Obrenovac, SFR Yugoslavia
- Party: POKS (2017–); DHSS (until 2017)
- Education: Belgrade Law School

Olgica Batić (Serbian Cyrillic: Олгица Батић, born 7 December 1981) is a Serbian lawyer and politician. She was President (2011–2017) of the now-defunct Christian Democratic Party (DHSS) and was a member of the National Assembly of Serbia (2012–2016). In 2017, DHSS merged into the Movement for the Restoration of the Kingdom of Serbia.

== Biography ==
Olgica Batić was born on December 7, 1981, in Belgrade; her father Vladan Batić (1949-2010) was president of the Christian Democratic Party of Serbia (DHSS). She attended elementary and high school in Obrenovac and high school in Belgrade. She graduated from the Belgrade Law School, University of Belgrade.

== Political career ==
After graduation, сhe joined the legal team of DHSS. After her father's death on December 29, 2010, at the General Assembly of the Christian Democratic Party of Serbia held 03.September 2011, she was elected president.

During the parliamentary elections in Serbia in 2012, she took part in the coalition Choice for a Better Life, with the support of outgoing President Boris Tadić. The Coalition has collected 863,294 votes or 22.06% of the vote, or 67 seats in the Parliament. Olgica Batić was elected a deputy, and was a vice-president of the parliamentary group of "Serbian Renewal Movement - Christian Democratic Party of Serbia". She was member of the Committee on Judiciary, Public Administration and Local Government, Committee on Administrative, Budgetary, Mandate and Immunity Issues and deputy member of the Committee on Constitutional Affairs and Legislation. It was noted that Batić gave her parliamentary remuneration to charity.

On 12 October 2017, the Christian Democratic Party of Serbia merged into the Movement for the Restoration of the Kingdom of Serbia. Batić stated full support for the Movement's primary goals - traditional values, preserving the family, the fight for Serbian farmers and the full membership of Serbia in the European Union.

== Legal career ==
Olgica Batić is a lawyer in the Batić Law Office. During the lawyer's career she was engaged in a number of prosecutions that have occupied the attention of the public, including the representation of the family of one of the victims of the Guards in Topčider Case. At the beginning of her career she gained experience in working with her father, Dr. Vladan Batić. Olgica Batić participated in a number of cases in different areas, from homicide, the representation of the largest companies in Serbia, to the provision of assistance to citizens in different areas.
