= Social Democratic Party (Serbia, 2002) =

Former centre-left political party in Serbia

- Founded: April 2002
- Dissolved: January 2010
- Merger of: Social Democracy (SD); Social Democratic Union (SDU)
- Ideology: Social democracy; Pro-Europeanism
- Political position: Center-left

The Social Democratic Party (SDP; Serbian: Социјалдемократска партија, romanized: Socijaldemokratska partija; СДП) was a social democratic political party in Serbia.

== History ==
The SDP was founded in April 2002 as a merger between Social Democracy (SD) and the Social Democratic Union (SDU). In the same year, the SDP joined the DOS governing coalition. A year later the SDP withdrew its support of the government resulting in its fall and an early election. Inner-party disagreements resulted in a split in the SDP. A group of members, led by Žarko Korać, left the SDP and re-founded the SDU in 2003.

In the 2003 parliamentary election, the SDP ran in a coalition with the G17 Plus, which received 11.46% of the popular vote and 34 seats, 3 of which went to the SDP. Slobodan Lalović became the Minister of Labour, Employment and Social Policy in the minority government of Vojislav Koštunica. In August 2005 the SDP refused to support the proposed pension and oil industry laws. As a result two of its deputies stopped supporting the government. Ljilja Nestorović and Meho Omerović went into opposition, while the third, Slobodan Lalović kept his post, subsequently withdrawing from the party and becoming an independent deputy.

In 2004, the Democratic Alternative (DA), led by Nebojša Čović, merged into the SDP and assumed leadership over the party.

The SDP competed in the 2007 parliamentary election together with the Party of United Pensioners of Serbia (PUPS). The PUPS-SDP coalition also included the Socialist People's Party. The coalition received 3.11% of the popular vote, thus failing to pass the 5% minimum threshold to enter parliament.

The SDP ceased to exist in January 2010, which resulted in the bitter words between former party leadership members Nebojša Čović and Oliver Ivanović.
