= 1997 Serbian presidential election =

- 7 December 1997 (first round); 21 December 1997 (second round)
- Turnout: 50.94% (▲1.99 pp)
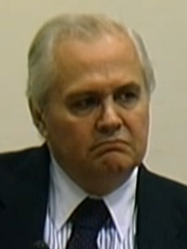

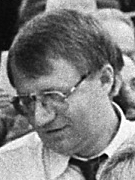
Candidate	Milan Milutinović	Vojislav Šešelj
Party	SPS	SRS
Popular vote	2,181,808	1,383,868
Percentage	61.19%	38.81%
- Second round results by district Milutinović: 50–60% 60–70% 70–80% 80–90%
President before election
Dragan Tomić (acting)
SPS
Elected President
Milan Milutinović
SPS

Presidential elections were held in the Yugoslav province of Serbia on 7 December 1997, following the annulment of the results of the September–October elections due to low voter turnout. As no candidate won over 50% of the popular vote in the first round, a runoff was scheduled for 21 December. The result was a victory for Milan Milutinović of the Socialist Party of Serbia, who defeated Vojislav Šešelj in the second round.

== Results ==
Candidate	Party	First round		Second round	
Candidate	Party	Votes	%	Votes	%
Milan Milutinović	Left Coalition (SPS–JUL–ND)	1,665,822	44.62	2,181,808	61.19
Vojislav Šešelj	Serbian Radical Party	1,227,076	32.87	1,383,868	38.81
Vuk Drašković	Serbian Renewal Movement	587,776	15.74		
Vuk Obradović	Social Democracy	115,850	3.10		
Dragoljub Mićunović	Democratic Centre	86,583	2.32		
Miodrag Vidojković	Independent	29,180	0.78		
Predrag Vuletić	Liberal Democratic Party	21,353	0.57		
Total		3,733,640	100.00	3,565,676	100.00
Valid votes		3,733,640	97.98	3,565,676	96.87
Invalid/blank votes		76,911	2.02	115,319	3.13
Total votes		3,810,551	100.00	3,680,995	100.00
Registered voters/turnout		7,226,947	52.73	7,225,860	50.94
Source: RIK
