= Miloš Nešović =

Serbian politician

Miloš Nešović (Serbian Cyrillic: Милош Нешовић; born 2 May 1937) is a Serbian politician and administrator. He was the leader of the Kosovo District from 1996 to 1998 and a member of the National Assembly of Serbia from 1997 to 2004. During his political career, he was a member of the Socialist Party of Serbia (Socijalistička partija Srbije, SPS).

== Private career ==
Nešović has a bachelor's degree in engineering, in the field of labour organization.

== Administrator in Kosovo ==
Nešović was deputy leader of the Kosovo District in the mid-1990s, working under Aleksa Jokić in 1995 and 1996. During this period, Serbian political life was dominated by the authoritarian rule of SPS leader Slobodan Milošević, and most Kosovo Albanians were boycotting Serbian state institutions in favour of parallel institutions established under Ibrahim Rugova's leadership. Nešović's appointment coincided with a brief period of relative improvement in relations between leaders of the communities. In June 1996, Jokić and Nešović were present at the opening of the United States Information Center in Kosovo, as was Rugova.

Nešović was promoted to leader of the Kosovo District in late 1996. The Kosovo insurgency grew over the next year and a half, as the Kosovo Liberation Army (KLA) increased its presence as a militant force in the province. In a New York Times article written by Chris Hedges in February 1997, Nešović was quoted as saying, "These terrorist groups are well trained and well equipped. The police have just broken a terrorist cell with dozens of armed militants. They found automatic weapons, explosives and sophisticated communications equipment." In the same month, Nešović told representatives of a European Parliament delegation to Kosovo and Metohija that Kosovo was an integral part of Serbia and Yugoslavia, and that conflict in the province should be resolved through negotiations. He was replaced as leader of the Kosovo District by Veljko Odalović in early 1998, as the Kosovo War was beginning.

== Parliamentarian and Telekom administrator ==
Nešović was given the lead position on the Socialist Party's electoral list for the Kraljevo division in the 1997 Serbian parliamentary election and was elected when the list won two seats. The SPS formed a coalition government with the far-right Serbian Radical Party (Srpska radikalna stranka, SRS) and the Yugoslav Left (Jugoslovenska Levica, JUL) after the election, and Nešović served as a government supporter. In January 1998, he was chosen as deputy chair of the committee for traffic and communications.

He was also appointed as the first general manager of Telekom Srbija in 1997, soon after the company's founding. In May 1999, he said that the Kosovo War and the NATO bombing of Yugoslavia had caused an estimated one billion Deutschemarks worth of damage to the company, which he added was still operating full-time and carrying out its responsibilities as well as possible under the circumstances. He noted that Telekom Srbija was in constant contact with state authorities in Kosovo and Metohija and was working to restore its links in the province. Most of Kosovo ultimately fell beyond Serbia's control after the war.

Nešović was given further responsibilities as head of the Moravica District in this period and worked to find housing for Kosovo Serb refugees in late 1999. Various Serbian officials were placed under international sanctions in the aftermath of the Kosovo War, and in March 2000 Nešović was included on a list of officials unable to obtain visas from European Union countries.

Slobodan Milošević was defeated by Democratic Opposition of Serbia (Demokratska opozicija Srbije, DOS) candidate Vojislav Koštunica in the 2000 Yugoslavian presidential election, a watershed moment in Serbian and Yugoslavian politics. The new administration demanded Nešović's resignation as general manager of Telekom. He initially refused to leave, saying that he had "always worked in a very professional manner" irrespective of his political affiliation. He ultimately stood down on 7 November 2000 after a strike by the company's workers, and he was formally removed from office the following week.

Serbia's government fell after Milošević's defeat in the Yugoslavian election, and a new Serbian parliamentary election was called for December 2000. Prior to the vote, Serbia's electoral laws were changed such that the entire country became a single electoral division and all mandates were assigned to candidates on successful lists at the discretion of the sponsoring parties or coalitions, irrespective of numerical order. Nešović appeared in the 154th position out of 250 on the SPS's list, which was mostly alphabetical, and was given a mandate for a new term when the list won thirty-seven seats. The DOS won a landslide majority victory, and the SPS served in opposition in the parliament that followed. During his second term, Nešović was a member of the committee for traffic and communications. He did not seek re-election in 2003, and his parliamentary tenure ended in January 2004.

== Since 2003 ==
Nešović was named as one of Kraljevo's honorary citizens of the year in 2017.
