= Democratic Fatherland Party =

Political party in Serbia

The Democratic Fatherland Party (Serbian: Демократска странка отаџбина/ Demokratska stranka otadžbina) was a political party in Serbia.

The party was led by Radoslav Avlijaš from 19 August 2002. In the 2003 parliamentary election it was part of the Independent Serbia coalition and won no seats.

In the invalidated 2003 presidential election Avlijaš came in last with 0.83% of the vote. His key goals were achieving inner and international stability, reducing poverty, expanding the middle class, investing in scientific research and the accession of Serbia to the EU.

The party officially ceased to exist on 14 April 2010.
