= For National Unity (Serbia) =

For National Unity (Serbian: За Народно Јединство, romanized: Za Narodno Jedinstvo) was a political coalition in Serbia. At the last legislative elections on 28 December 2003, the alliance won 1.82% of the popular vote and no seats. The alliance was formed by the Party of Serbian Unity, People's Peasant Party, People's Party, Radovan Radović's Our Home Serbia and the Serb Party.
