= Serbian Democratic Renewal Movement =

The Serbian Democratic Renewal Movement (Serbian: Српски Демократски Покрет Обнове, СДПО / Srpski Demokratski Pokret Obnove, SDPO) was a monarchist political party in Serbia.

The SDPO was formed in 2005, after a split in the Serbian Renewal Movement (SPO). The split was the result of major disagreements with the leadership of Vuk Drašković and his influential wife Danica Drašković.

The SDPO last participated in the 2007 Serbian parliamentary election in coalition with the Democratic Party of Serbia and New Serbia. The SDPO ceased to exist in 2010, on the national level, after the new law on political parties was taken by the parliament demanding all parties to register again under new conditions.
