= Independent Serbia (political alliance) =

Independent Serbia (Serbian: Самостална Србија, Samostalna Srbija) was a political coalition in Serbia led by the Christian Democratic Party of Serbia. The alliance was formed by the Christian Democratic Party of Serbia, the Democratic Fatherland Party, Democratic Movement of Romanians of Serbia and the Peasants Party.

In the 2003 election, the alliance won no seats.
