= Milan Paroški =

Serbian writer and politician

Opposition Member of the National Assembly of Serbia
- In office 1990–1992

Personal details
- Born: 5 March 1957 (age 69) Turija, FPR Yugoslavia
- Party: People's Party (1990–2010); Healthy Serbia (2017–present)
- Education: University of Belgrade Faculty of Political Sciences
- Occupation: Writer

Milan Paroški (Serbian Cyrillic: Милан Парошки; born 5 March 1957) is a Serbian writer and politician.

== Biography ==
He held a speech at the 9 March 1991 protest in Belgrade. Paroški advocated that the FR Yugoslavia recognize the Republic of Serbian Krajina and was leader of the Serbian Chetnik Movement in 1993.

He ran for president of Serbia as candidate of the People's Party and the Serbian Opposition in the 1992 Serbian general election where he received 147,693 votes. He ran for president once again (also as candidate of the People's Party) in the 1997 Serbian general election where he received 27,100 votes.

In 2017 Paroški was a founder of the Christian nationalist party Healthy Serbia.

== Published books ==
- RH negativno, 1990
- Hronika za ujedinjeno srpsko kraljevstvo, 1993
- O državi i narodu, 2000
- Andavil, 2001
- Raci, 2003
- Ra i novi svetski poredak, 2003
- Usekovanije, 2006
- Sveti Sava i Solomonova mudrost, 2009
- Skupštinska proročanstva, 2012
- Sorabi su prezali irvase, 2015
