= Vuk Obradović =

Serbian general and politician

- Вук Обрадовић
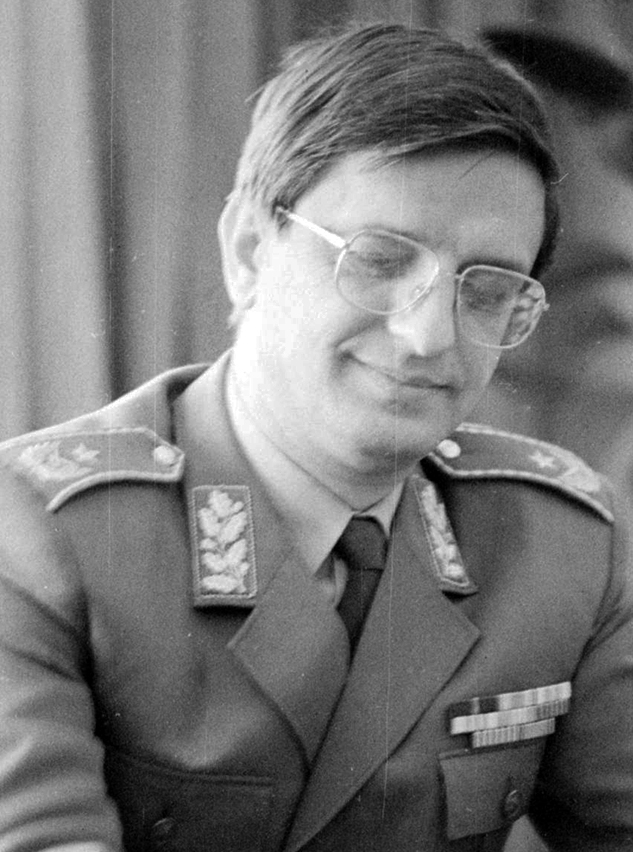
- Obradović in 1992

Deputy Prime Minister of Serbia
- In office 25 January 2001 – 12 December 2001
- Prime Minister: Zoran Đinđić

Personal details
- Born: 11 April 1947 Kondželj, PR Serbia, FPR Yugoslavia
- Died: 13 February 2008 (aged 60) Belgrade, Serbia
- Party: SD (1997–2008)
- Education: Military Academy Belgrade
- Occupation: Military person; Businessman; Politician
- Awards: Order of Labour

Military service
- Branch/service: Yugoslav People's Army
- Years of service: 1967–1992
- Rank: Major General

Vuk Obradović (April 11, 1947 in the village of Kondželj, Yugoslavia – February 13, 2008 in Belgrade) was a Serbian general and politician. He was one of the leaders of the Democratic Opposition of Serbia in the Bulldozer Revolution in October 2000.

Before his political career, he was a professional soldier who later became the second youngest general in the Yugoslav People's Army. He held a PhD in political studies, having defended a thesis on issues of nationalism in Yugoslav society. He resigned from the Army in May 1992, when the government refused to withdraw Yugoslav Army conscripts from fighting in Croatia.

After leaving the army, he formed the Social Democracy political party and remained its leader for almost 10 years. In 1997, he stood as a candidate in the Yugoslav presidential elections winning 3.04% of the popular vote. In 2000, he joined the Democratic Opposition of Serbia which finally toppled Slobodan Milošević in October that year. He became the deputy prime minister in the Government of Serbia tasked with leading the drive against corruption. In May 2001, he was forced to resign due to an allegation of sexual harassment of a female aide Ljiljana Nestorović, leading to the break-up of Social Democracy party into two factions.

In 2002, he was once again a candidate in the presidential election, this time winning only 0.73% of the popular vote.
