= Civic Alliance of Serbia =

Former liberal political party in Serbia

Civic Alliance of Serbia Грађански савез Србије Građanski savez Srbije
- Leader: Vesna Pešić; Goran Svilanović; Nataša Mićić
- Founded: 10 June 1992; 34 years ago
- Dissolved: 7 April 2007; 19 years ago
- Merged into: Liberal Democratic Party
- Ideology: Liberalism; Pro-Europeanism; Social liberalism; Atlanticism; Anti-nationalism
- Political position: Centre
- European affiliation: European Liberal Democrat and Reform Party (ELDR)

Website
- www.gradjanskisavez.org.yu (archived)

The Civic Alliance of Serbia (Serbian: Грађански савез Србије, romanized: Građanski savez Srbije; abbr. ГСС or GSS) was a liberal political party in Serbia.

== History ==
The Civic Alliance of Serbia (GSS) was founded on 10 June 1992. Initially, it was a coalition of two successor parties to Ante Marković's Yugoslavia-wide Union of Reform Forces for Serbia proper and Vojvodina, renamed the Reform Party of Serbia and League of Social Democrats of Vojvodina respectively, along with the Serbian successor to the Association for the Yugoslav Democratic Initiative renamed the Republican Club, and the People's Peasant Party. In the 1992 election, the coalition was represented by Ratomir Tanić. Following the election, the Republican Club led by Nebojša Popov and the Reform Party of Serbia led by Vesna Pešić merged to form the GSS party.

In 1996 Žarko Korać left the GSS with a group of dissidents who opposed forming coalition with the right-wing Serbian Renewal Movement for the 1996 federal election and formed the Social Democratic Union (SDU).

Notable members over the years included Goran Svilanović, former Foreign Minister of Serbia and Montenegro, Nataša Mićić, former parliamentary president and acting president of Serbia, Gašo Knezević, former Serbian Minister of Education, and Vesna Pešić, the party founder and longtime leader.

The future of the party had been in doubt ever since it split into two wings. One part promoted a merger with Democratic Party, while the other part wanted to continue political existence as an independent party. The December 2004 party congress upheld the decision to remain an independent party and elected Nataša Mićić as the new leader. The party decided to apply for membership of the ELDR and the Liberal International. At its May 2004 council, ELDR, accepted GSS as an affiliate member.

However, GSS merged into Liberal Democratic Party (LDP) on April 7, 2007. The party had three representatives in the National Assembly of Serbia in 2007 elected from the list of the LDP.

== Presidents of the Civic Alliance of Serbia (1992–2007) ==
#	President	Born-Died	Term start	Term end
1	Vesna Pešić	1940–	10 June 1992	1 August 1999
2	Goran Svilanović	1963–	1 August 1999	12 December 2004
3	Nataša Mićić	1965–	12 December 2004	7 April 2007

== Electoral performance ==
=== Parliamentary elections ===
Year	Popular vote	% of popular vote	# of seats	Seat change	Coalition	Status
1992	17,276	0.37%	0 / 250	Steady	with LSV-NSS	no seats
1993	715,564	16.64%	2 / 250	▲2	DEPOS	opposition
1997	Election boycott		0 / 250	▼1	–	no seats
2000	2,402,387	64.09%	9 / 250	▲9	DOS	government
2003	481,249	12.58%	2 / 250	▼7	With DS-DC-SDU-LZS	opposition
2007	214,262	5.31%	3 / 250	▲1	With LDP-SDU-LSV-DHSS	opposition

== Positions held ==
Major positions held by Civic Alliance of Serbia members:

President of the National Assembly of Serbia	Years
Nataša Mićić	2001–2004
Mayor of Belgrade	Years
Radmila Hrustanović	2001–2004
