= Radoslav Jović =

Politician and medical doctor in Serbia

Radoslav Jović (Serbian Cyrillic: Радослав Јовић; born April 6, 1957) is a politician and medical doctor in Serbia. He served three terms in the National Assembly of Serbia between 1997 and 2008, originally with the Serbian Renewal Movement (Srpski pokret obnove, SPO) and later with the breakaway Serbian Democratic Renewal Movement (Srpski Demokratski Pokret Obnove, SDPO). He was also the mayor of Kraljevo from 2003 to 2005. In 2014, Jović returned to the assembly as a member of the Serbian Progressive Party (Srpska napredna stranka, SNS).

== Early life and career ==
Jović was born in Kraljevo, then part of the People's Republic of Serbia in the Federal People's Republic of Yugoslavia. He trained as a doctor and conducted research on malignant tumours. In his fourth year of medical school, he promoted the notion of cancer as a form of evolutionary regression on the cellular level and suggested that it could be countered through the selective use of viruses. His research was covered in the Serbian media and published in book form in 1997. When American researchers published similar findings in 2005, some suggested the possibility of a direct influence.

== Political career ==
=== SPO representative, mayor, and SDPO representative ===
Jović first entered the National Assembly of Serbia after the 1997 Serbian parliamentary election, in which he received the lead position on the SPO's electoral list for the Kraljevo division. The party won two mandates in the division, and he was declared elected. The Socialist Party of Serbia and its allies won the election, the SPO served in opposition.

Jović served as president of the Kraljevo municipal assembly in this period. In 1998, he helped establish the annual Kraljevdan event as a celebration of the city's royalist history. He called on other Serbian towns to take in more Kosovo Serb refugees the following year, after Kraljevo's resources were challenged by a large number of refugees converging on the city.

Serbia's political system was reformed for the 2000 parliamentary election, the first to be held after the downfall of Slobodan Milošević's administration. The entire country became a single electoral district, and mandates were awarded to parties instead of individual candidates, with the result that successful parties often distributed their mandates out of numerical order to candidates on their electoral lists. The SPO ran its own slate rather than joining a broad coalition called the Democratic Opposition of Serbia (DOS), which consisted of several parties that had opposed Milošević's rule. This proved to be a strategic error; the DOS won a landslide victory while the SPO did not receive a sufficient number of votes to cross the electoral threshold to win representation in the assembly. Jović, who was included in the SPO list, saw his parliamentary career come to a temporary end.

Jović became the mayor of Kraljevo via direct elections in 2003, defeating a candidate of the Democratic Party of Serbia in a run-off. As mayor, he oversaw privatization proceedings for Magnohrom, a lead industrial firm in the city. He resigned in 2005 rather than defending his position in a recall referendum that had been initiated by the Serbian Radical Party; Jović argued that he did not want to defend his position at taxpayers' expense. He later challenged the legality of the recall proceedings.

The SPO contested the 2003 parliamentary election in an alliance with New Serbia. Jović received the tenth position on the combined list and was selected as an SPO delegate after the list won twenty-two mandates. He took his seat when the assembly met in 2004. The SPO was part of Vojislav Koštunica's coalition government in this period, and Jović served as part of the government's parliamentary majority.

The SPO experienced a serious split in 2005, and several of its members, including Jović, joined the breakaway Serbian Democratic Renewal Movement. The party contested the 2007 parliamentary election as a junior partner on a coalition list led by the Democratic Party of Serbia and New Serbia; Jović received the ninety-seventh list position. The coalition won forty-seven seats, and Jović was one of two SDPO candidates to be awarded a new mandate. The party provided support to Vojislav Koštunica's government, and Jović again served with the government's parliamentary majority. The SDPO did not contest the 2008 election.

=== SNS representative ===
The SDPO ceased to exist in 2010. Jović later joined the Serbian Progressive Party.

Serbia's electoral system was reformed in 2011, such that parliamentary mandates were awarded in numerical order to candidates on successful lists. Jović received the eighty-second position on the Progressive Party's Aleksandar Vučić — Future We Believe In list in the 2014 parliamentary election and returned to the assembly when the list won a majority with 158 out of 250 mandates. For the 2016 election, he was dropped to the 136th position the successor Aleksandar Vučić – Serbia Is Winning list. The Progressive-led alliance won a second consecutive majority with 131 mandates; Jović was not immediately re-elected but was able to take his seat once again on October 6, 2016, following the resignation of other Progressive Party members further up the list.
