= Social Democracy (Serbia) =

Political party in Serbia

Social Democracy Социјалдемократија Socijaldemokratija
- Abbreviation: SD
- President: Vuk Obradović (first); Nenad Vukasović (last)
- Founders: Vuk Obradović; Pavić Obradović; Dušan Janjić
- Founded: 12 July 1997; 29 years ago
- Dissolved: 20 April 2010; 16 years ago
- Headquarters: Belgrade, Serbia
- Ideology: Social democracy
- Political position: Centre-left
- National affiliation: Alliance for Changes (1998-2000); Democratic Opposition of Serbia (2000-2003)
- Colours: Blue; Red

Website
- www.socijaldemokratija.org.yu (archived)

Social Democracy (Serbian Cyrillic: Социјалдемократија, romanised: Socijaldemokratija, abbr. SD) was a political party in Serbia. SD was led by Vuk Obradović from 1997 to 2006 and Nenad Vukasović from 2006 to 2010. It took part in 2007 Serbian parliamentary election as an independent list but won no seats with only 0.12 percent of vote or 4,903 votes. It is one of four parties that won less than 10,000 votes even though they had to submit exactly the same number of signatures in order to be able to run in the elections.
