= Vladan Batić =

Serbian lawyer and politician

- Владан Батић
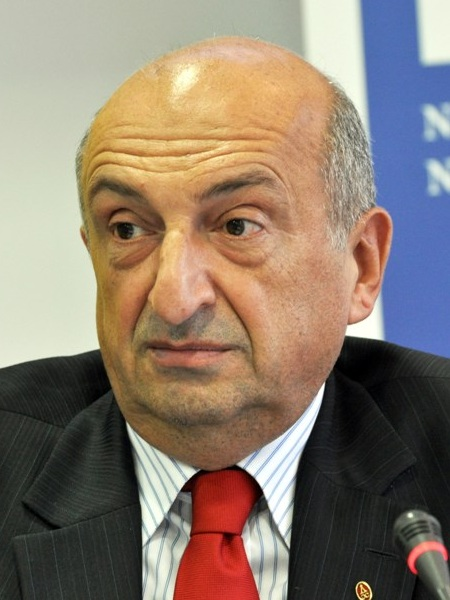

Minister of Justice
- In office 25 January 2001 – 3 March 2004
- Prime Minister: Zoran Đinđić; Nebojša Čović (acting); Žarko Korać (acting); Zoran Živković
- Preceded by: Zoran Nikolić (co-minister); Dragan Subašić (co-minister); Sead Spahović (co-minister)
- Succeeded by: Zoran Stojković

Personal details
- Born: 27 July 1949 Obrenovac, PR Serbia, FPR Yugoslavia
- Died: 29 December 2010 (aged 61) Obrenovac, Serbia
- Party: DSS (1992–1997); DHSS (1997–2010)
- Education: Belgrade Law School
- Profession: Lawyer

Vladan Batić (Serbian: Владан Батић; 27 July 1949 – 29 December 2010) was a Serbian lawyer and politician. He served as the Minister of Justice in the Government of Serbia from 2001 until 2004.

== Education and career ==
He graduated from the University of Belgrade's Law School, where he eventually obtained doctorate. In 2001, Batić announced that warrants would be issued for the arrests of persons removed from power during the overthrow of Slobodan Milošević in October 2000 and who were suspected of misconduct through abuse of power. It was this campaign which eventually led to the surrender of Slobodan Milošević to police as an alternative to forced arrest, and the first step to his extradition to the ICTY.

In 2004 he ran for Serbian Presidency in the election. At the time of his death Batić was the President of the Christian Democratic Party of Serbia and since 2007 a Member of Parliament as a part of his party's bloc formed with their coalition partner the Liberal Democratic Party.

Batić reappeared in international news media spotlight when he testified before a Nicosia court that billions of dollars belonging to the Serbia had been smuggled out of the country by the ousted Milošević administration during the UN sanctions on the country, by use of offshore corporations in Cyprus registered by the former law office of the Greek Cypriot leader, Tassos Papadopoulos. Batić had been pursuing the affair since 2002.

Batić died on 29 December 2010 from throat cancer.

Political offices
| Preceded by Zoran Nikolić (co-minister); Dragan Subašić (co-minister); Sead Spahović (co-minister) | Minister of Justice of Serbia; 2001–2004 | Succeeded by Zoran Stojković |
