= Christian Democratic Party of Serbia =

Former political party

Christian Democratic Party of Serbia Демохришћанска Странка Србије Demohrišćanska Stranka Srbije
- Leader: Olgica Batić (last)
- Founder: Vladan Batić
- Founded: May 7, 1997
- Dissolved: October 12, 2017
- Split from: Democratic Party of Serbia
- Merged into: Movement for the Restoration of the Kingdom of Serbia
- Headquarters: Terazije 14, Belgrade
- Ideology: Christian democracy; Conservative liberalism; Pro-Europeanism; Atlanticism
- Political position: Center to center-right
- International affiliation: Centrist Democrat International (Observer)

Website
- www.dhss.org.rs/

The Christian Democratic Party of Serbia (Serbian: Демохришћанска Странка Србије, romanized: Demohrišćanska Stranka Srbije; abbr. ДХСС, DHSS) was a political party in Serbia.

== History ==
The party was founded in 1997 by Vladan Batić after leaving the Democratic Party of Serbia (DSS), following disagreements with its leader Vojislav Koštunica.

Following the reestablishment of diplomatic dialogue between the Serbian and Montenegrin governments, mediated by Javier Solana, the DHSS started a campaign called Serbia Also Has a Say (I Srbija se pita) in late 2001 calling for a referendum in Serbia on Serbia's secession from the Federal Republic of Yugoslavia. The party was part of the DOS government from 2001 until 20 November 2002 when it froze its participation following a vote by the DOS against starting a parliamentary debate concerning Serbia's independence from Serbia and Montenegro. It advocated a referendum on the issue following the overthrow of Slobodan Milošević. A petition asking for the referendum collected 400,000 signatures.

The DHSS was opposed to the Constitutional Charter of Serbia and Montenegro citing the differences between the two republics' monetary, financial and banking systems, and advocated the dissolution of the federation. It strongly advocated voting in the 2001 Kosovan election, in which it supported the "Return" coalition.

In the 2003 election, the DHSS was part of the Independent Serbia coalition which won no seats.

In the 2007 election, DHSS president Vladan Batić was listed on the Liberal Democratic Party electoral list and won one seat.

In the 2008 election, the DHSS went in coalition with the Liberal Democratic Party and the Social Democratic Union, and won one seat, awarded to Vladan Batić. However, on 10 November 2008 Batić left the LDP parliamentary group and from then on voted as an independent MP. The split occurred because the LDP had recently joined the Alliance of Liberals and Democrats for Europe and couldn't go on in coalition with a conservative party. At that time, the DHSS was also interested in joining the European People's Party.

After the death of Vladan Batić on 29 December 2010 the leadership of the party was transferred to his daughter Olgica Batić according to his wish. She was officially elected leader on 3 September 2011.

In the 2012 parliamentary election, the DHSS was part of the Choice for a Better Life coalition centered around the Democratic Party and won one seat in the National Assembly of Serbia. The sole MP was Olgica Batić.

In the 2014 parliamentary election, the DHSS went in coalition with the Serbian Renewal Movement, which was in turn part of the Future We Believe In coalition centered around the Serbian Progressive Party. The DHSS won one seat and its sole MP was Olgica Batić. On 12 October 2017, the DHSS merged into the Movement for the Restoration of the Kingdom of Serbia (POKS). Party president Olgica Batić stated full support for the Movement's primary goals - traditional values, preserving the family, the fight for Serbian farmers and the full membership of Serbia in the European Union.

Even though the party has been long gone, it has remained in the party register of Serbia since then.

== Electoral results ==
=== Parliamentary elections ===
Year	Popular vote	% of popular vote	# of seats	Seat change	Coalition	Status
2000	2,402,387	64.09%	7 / 250	▲7	DOS	government
2003	45,211	1.18%	0 / 250	▼7	SS	no seats
2007	214,262	5.31%	1 / 250	▲1	With LDP-GSS-SDU-LSV	opposition
2008	216,902	5.24%	1 / 250	Steady	With LDP-SDU	opposition
2012	863,294	22.07%	1 / 250	Steady	IZBŽ	opposition
2014	1,736,920	48.35%	1 / 250	Steady	Around SNS	gov′t support
