= People's Party (Serbia, 1990) =

People's Party Народна странка
- President: Milan Paroški
- Founded: 2 Аugust 1990 (First time); 18 Аugust 1997 (Second time)
- Dissolved: 18 December 1995 (First time); 13 April 2010 (Second time)
- Merged into: Democratic Party (First time); Serbian Monarchist Party "Serbian Unity" (Second time)
- Headquarters: 13 Pariska, Belgrade; 8 Jovana Subotića, Novi Sad
- Ideology: Monarchism; Serbian nationalism Vojvodina autonomism Atlanticism
- Political position: Right-wing
- Colours: Maroon

Website
- narodnans.org (archived)

The People's Party (Serbian: Народна странка / Narodna stranka) was a political party in Serbia. Its president was Milan Paroški.

== History ==
In the 1990 election it ran in coalition with the Serbian Renewal Movement and won one seat in one of the districts of Novi Sad. The elected MP was Milan Paroški.

On 18 December 1995 it was announced that the People's Party was merging with the Democratic Party, taking a right-wing turn under Zoran Đinđić. This proved highly controversial, and Đinđić defended the decision saying that Paroški was remembered not for his monarchism but for his strong opposition credentials.

On 18 August 1997 the party split with the political council of the Democratic Party, insisting against the electoral boycott of the 1997 election.

In 2010 the party merged into the Serbian Monarchist Party "Serbian Unity".

== Policies ==
The party advocated adding religious education to schools and universities, as "the exclusion of religious education has contributed to the spiritual impoverishment of the entirety of Serbdom and the severing of ties with tradition and history".

It advocated the "reconstitution of the FRY and the legally unstable position and status of Vojvodina", the relocation of the ministries of agriculture, foreign trade and international relations to Novi Sad, and the regionalization of Serbia so that the "Serbian Voivodeship, or Vojvodina, could be emancipated inside the current polity".

In 2001 Paroški stated that the Serbian government should urgently submit an application to join the Partnership for Peace and subsequently NATO so that the crisis in the Preševo Valley could be resolved in Serbia's favor, citing Serbia's affiliation in the Balkan Wars as well as the First and Second World War.

He has also stated in 2001 that it is in Serbia's best interest for the Montenegrins to "leave as soon as possible". He has declared support for the peaceful dissolution of the Federal Republic of Yugoslavia providing that Serbia is able to sell the submarines currently operating in the Adriatic, saying "Me, my grandfather and my father bought them, not the Montenegrins, or their fathers and grandfathers. Why should it be Milo Đukanović selling them so that they could spend the next ten or twenty years playing their gusle and benefiting from the money?".

== Electoral results ==
=== Parliamentary elections ===
Year	Popular vote	% of popular vote	# of seats	Seat change	Coalitions	Government
1990	794,789	15.79%	1 / 250	▲1	SPO	opposition
1992	130,139	2.76%	0 / 250	▼1	Serbian Opposition (SDS–SRB)	non-parliamentary
1993	48,331	1.12%	0 / 250	Steady		non-parliamentary
1997	15,232	0.37%	0 / 250	Steady	(Note: In the 1997 election, the People's Party went in coalition with Ljubomir Dodić's branch of the Peasants Party of Serbia in Kruševac.)	non-parliamentary
2003	68,537	1.79%	0 / 250	Steady	For National Unity	non-parliamentary
2008	3,795	0.09%	0 / 250	Steady	People's Movement for Serbia	non-parliamentary

=== Presidential elections ===
President of Serbia
Election year	#	Candidate	1st round votes	%	2nd round votes	%	Notes
1990	2nd	Vuk Drašković	824,674	16.40%	—	—	Support
1992	▼3rd	Milan Paroški	147,693	3.13%	—	—	
Sep 1997	▼8th	Milan Paroški	27,100	0.66%	—	—	Election declared invalid due to low turnout

== Sources ==
- Thomas, Robert (1999). Serbia Under Milošević: Politics in the 1990s. London: Hurst & Company. ISBN 1-85065-341-0.
