= People's Democratic Party (Serbia) =

The People's Democratic Party (Serbian: Народна демократска странка, romanized: Narodna demokratska stranka, abbr. NDS) was a political party in Serbia led by Slobodan Vuksanović.

== History ==
Vukasnović was a high official in the Democratic Party until 2000, when he left the party and joined Otpor and subsequently the Movement for Democratic Serbia, led by Momčilo Perišić. He was expelled from the party in 2001 and then formed NDS.

In the 2003 parliamentary elections it was part of the Democratic Party of Serbia-led coalition, winning three of the alliance's 53 seats. It merged into DSS in October 2004.
