= G17 Plus =

Political party in Serbia

G17 Plus Г17 плус
- President: Miroljub Labus (2002–2006); Mlađan Dinkić (2006–2013)
- Founder: Miroljub Labus
- Founded: 15 December 2002; 23 years ago
- Dissolved: 21 April 2013; 13 years ago
- Merged into: United Regions of Serbia
- Headquarters: Trg Republike 5, Belgrade
- Ideology: Liberal conservatism; Liberalism; Neoliberalism; Pro-Europeanism
- Political position: Centre-right
- European affiliation: European People's Party
- Colours: Blue and Grey

Website
- g17plus.rs (archived)

G17 Plus was a centre-right political party in Serbia. Founded as a non-governmental organization dealing with economic issues, in 2002 it transformed into a political party that became part of several ruling coalition governments in Serbia throughout the 2000s and early 2010s. In 2013, it merged into United Regions of Serbia.

== History ==
G17 Plus was founded in 1997 as a non-governmental organization (NGO) in Serbia, then a federal unit within FR Yugoslavia. The organization consisting of economic experts enjoyed financial support of the United States through the National Endowment for Democracy (NED).

The organization was registered as a political party on 15 December 2002, with Miroljub Labus as its first president.

At its first electoral showing at the 2003 parliamentary elections, G17 Plus received 11.5% of the popular vote and 34 seats in the National Assembly.

In March 2004, G17+ formed a coalition government with the Democratic Party of Serbia (DSS), the Serbian Renewal Movement (SPO) and New Serbia (NS). In May 2006 Miroljub Labus resigned as party leader and was replaced by Mlađan Dinkić. On October 1, 2006, the party quit the governing coalition over its failure to find and extradite ICTY fugitive Ratko Mladić.

In the 2007 elections, the party received 6.82% of the popular vote and 19 seats in the parliament.

G17+ received a single seat in the Community Assembly of Kosovo and Metohija.

In 2010, G17 Plus founded the United Regions of Serbia (URS), a coalition of political parties and groups emphasizing decentralization and regional development of Serbia. After a few years functioning as the centerpiece of the coalition, in April 2013 G17 Plus fully merged with URS, transforming it into a political party.

In the Parliamentary Assembly of the Council of Europe, G17+ was associated with the European People's Party.

== Presidents of the G17 Plus (2002–2013) ==
#	President	Born–Died	Term start	Term end
1	Miroljub Labus	1947–	15 December 2002	16 May 2006
2	Mlađan Dinkić	1964–	16 May 2006	21 April 2013

== Electoral results ==
National Assembly of Serbia
Election	# of votes	% of vote	# of seats	+/-	Coalition	Status
2003	438,422	11.46%	31 / 250	▲31	with SDP	government 2004–06
2003	438,422	11.46%	31 / 250	▲31	with SDP	opposition 2006–07
2007	275,041	6.82%	19 / 250	▼12	—	government
2008	1,590,200	38.42%	24 / 250	▲5	ZES	government
2012	215,666	5.51%	10 / 250	▼14	URS	government 2012–13
2012	215,666	5.51%	10 / 250	▼14	URS	opposition 2013–14

=== Presidential elections ===
President of Serbia
Election year	#	Candidate	1st round votes	%	2nd round votes	%	Notes
2002	2nd	Miroljub Labus	995,200	27.96	1,516,693	31.62	Election declared invalid due to low turnout
2003	Election boycott						
2004	▼4th	Dragan Maršićanin	414,971	13.31	—	—	Government Coalition
2008	▲1st	Boris Tadić	1,457,030	35.39	2,304,467	50.31	For a European Serbia
2012	▼5th	Zoran Stanković	257,054	6.58%	—	—	United Regions of Serbia

== Positions held ==
Major positions held by G17 Plus members:

President of the National Assembly of Serbia	Years
Predrag Marković	2004–2006
Governor of the National Bank of Yugoslavia in Serbia and Montenegro	Years
Mlađan Dinkić	2000–2003
