= Democratic Opposition of Serbia =

Former political coalition in Serbia

Democratic Opposition of Serbia Демократска oпозиција Cрбије
- Abbreviation: DOS
- Founders: Vuk Drašković
- Founded: 10 January 2000
- Dissolved: 18 November 2003
- Headquarters: Belgrade
- Ideology: Anti-Milošević
- Political position: Big tent
- Slogan: "DOS, normalno"("DOS, normally")
- Chamber of Citizens of the FRY (2000): 58 / 138
- Chamber of Republics of the FRY (2000): 10 / 40
- National Assembly of Serbia (2000): 176 / 250

Website
- dos.org.yu (archived)

The Democratic Opposition of Serbia (Serbian Cyrillic: Демократска oпозиција Cрбије, romanized: Demokratska opozicija Srbije, abbr. DOS) was a wide electoral alliance of political parties in Serbia, intent on ousting the ruling Socialist Party of Serbia and its leader, Slobodan Milošević.

== History ==
Its presidential candidate, Vojislav Koštunica, defeated Milošević in the 2000 general election, while the DOS secured a majority of seats in the National Assembly. The coalition was able to form a government and selected Zoran Đinđić for Prime Minister.

Koštunica's Democratic Party of Serbia left the coalition government in July 2001, in protest of the government's decision to extradite Slobodan Milošević to the ICTY, and officially left the coalition in July next year. Social Democracy was pushed into the opposition in May 2001 after a split in the party, as the faction which was eventually recognized by the Supreme Court of Serbia as the legitimate name bearer, was not regarded as such by the DOS, which transferred all the positions held by the party members to the other faction's adherents. That faction, having not received the legal recognition, had merged in July 2002 with the Social Democratic Union into the Social Democratic Party.

In March 2003, after a split in this party, the Social Democratic Union was renewed, still being a member of the DOS, while the Social Democratic Party was excluded from the coalition in November 2003, after having announced that it would support the opposition's demand for the government's deposition. In May 2003, New Serbia was excluded from the coalition after a series of conflicts with the other members. In 2003, New Democracy was renamed into the Liberals of Serbia, and the Association of Free and Independent Trade Unions founded the Labour Party of Serbia, to which it transferred its membership in the DOS.

Dragoljub Mićunović, the DOS candidate, performed poorly in the 2003 presidential election and was even beaten by 11% by Tomislav Nikolić, candidate of the ultranationalist Serbian Radical Party. Since only 38% of the electors voted, the presidential election was cancelled for the third time in a row. Therefore, the DOS was disbanded on 18 November 2003. The disbanding was mostly decided by the Democratic Party, the party founded by the then Prime Minister Zoran Đinđić, who was later assassinated on 12 March 2003.

== Member parties ==
List of political parties affiliated with DOS
Name	Leader	MPs (2000 election)
Democratic Party	Zoran Đinđić	45 / 250
Democratic Party of Serbia	Vojislav Koštunica	45 / 250
Social Democracy	Vuk Obradović	9 / 250
New Democracy	Dušan Mihajlović	9 / 250
Civic Alliance of Serbia	Goran Svilanović	9 / 250
New Serbia	Velimir Ilić	8 / 250
Christian Democratic Party of Serbia	Vladan Batić	7 / 250
League of Social Democrats of Vojvodina	Nenad Čanak	6 / 250
Alliance of Vojvodina Hungarians	József Kasza	6 / 250
Democratic Alternative	Nebojša Čović	6 / 250
Movement for a Democratic Serbia	Momčilo Perišić	5 / 250
Democratic Centre	Dragoljub Mićunović	4 / 250
Social Democratic Union	Žarko Korać	4 / 250
People's Peasant Party	Dragan Veselinov	4 / 250
Reformists of Vojvodina	Miodrag Isakov	4 / 250
Sandžak Democratic Party	Rasim Ljajić	2 / 250
Otpor	Srđa Popović	1 / 250
League for Šumadija	Branislav Kovačević	1 / 250
Association of Free and Independent Trade Unions	Dragan Milovanović	1 / 250

== Electoral results ==
=== FR Yugoslavia ===
==== Chamber of Citizens ====
Year	Votes	Percentage	Seats	Ballot carrier	Control
2000	2,040,646	45.00%	58 / 138	Vojislav Koštunica	Coalition government

==== President ====
Year	Candidate	#	1st round votes	% of vote	#	2nd round votes	% of vote
2000	Vojislav Koštunica	1st	2,470,304	50.24%	—N/a	—	—

=== Republic of Serbia ===
==== National Assembly ====
Year	Popular vote	% of popular vote	Seats	Ballot carrier	Control
2000	2,402,387	64.09%	176 / 250	Zoran Đinđić	Majority government

==== President ====
Year	Candidate	#	1st round vote	% of vote	#	2nd round vote	% of vote
2002 (Note: Election declared invalid due to low turnout)	Miroljub Labus	2nd	995,200	27.92	2nd	921.094	31.62%
2003	Dragoljub Mićunović	2nd	893,906	35.42	—N/a	—	—

== Positions held ==
Major positions held by Democratic Opposition of Serbia members:

President of FR Yugoslavia	Party	Years
Vojislav Koštunica	Democratic Party of Serbia	2000–2002
President of the Chamber of Citizens of the Federal Assembly of Yugoslavia	Party	Years
Dragoljub Mićunović	Democratic Centre	2000–2003
Prime Minister of Serbia	Party	Years
Zoran Đinđić	Democratic Party	2001–2003
Zoran Živković	Democratic Party	2003
President of the National Assembly of Serbia	Party	Years
Dragan Maršićanin	Democratic Party of Serbia	2001
Nataša Mićić	Civic Alliance of Serbia	2001–2003
Chairmen of the Executive Council of Vojvodina	Party	Years
Đorđe Đukić	Democratic Party	2000–2004
President of the Assembly of Vojvodina	Party	Years
Nenad Čanak	League of Social Democrats of Vojvodina	2000–2003
Mayor of Belgrade	Party	Years
Milan St. Protić	New Serbia	2000–2001
Radmila Hrustanović	Civic Alliance of Serbia	2001–2003
Governor of the National Bank of Yugoslavia	Party	Years
Mlađan Dinkić	G17 Plus	2000–2003

== See also ==
- Overthrow of Slobodan Milošević
