= Democratic Centre (Serbia) =

Former centrist political party in Serbia

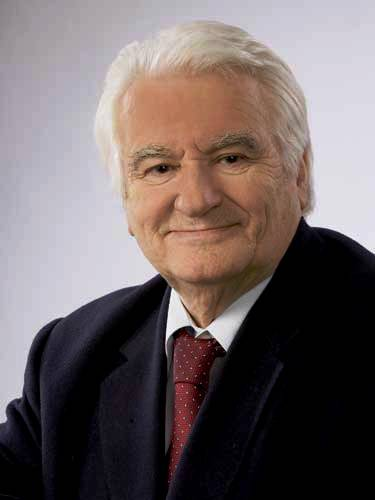
The founder of the party, Dragoljub Mićunović

Democratic Centre (Serbian: Демократски центар, romanized: Demokratski centar, abbr. DC) was a political party in Serbia. It was founded in 1996 by Dragoljub Mićunović, the former president of the Democratic Party (DS), when he left the DS.

At the 2003 Serbian parliamentary election, the party won 5 seats on the list of the DS. After the elections, it merged into the DS in 2004.
