= 2003 Serbian parliamentary election =

- 28 December 2003
- All 250 seats in the National Assembly; 126 seats needed for a majority
- Turnout: 58.74% ▲1.12 pp
Party	Leader	Vote %	Seats	+/–
SRS	Tomislav Nikolić	27.98	82	+59
DSS	Vojislav Koštunica	17.96	53	+8
DS–GSS–SDU	Boris Tadić	12.75	37	−25
G17+	Miroljub Labus	11.61	34	New
SPO–NS	Vuk Drašković	7.76	22	+14
SPS	Slobodan Milošević	7.72	22	−15
This lists parties that won seats. See the complete results below.
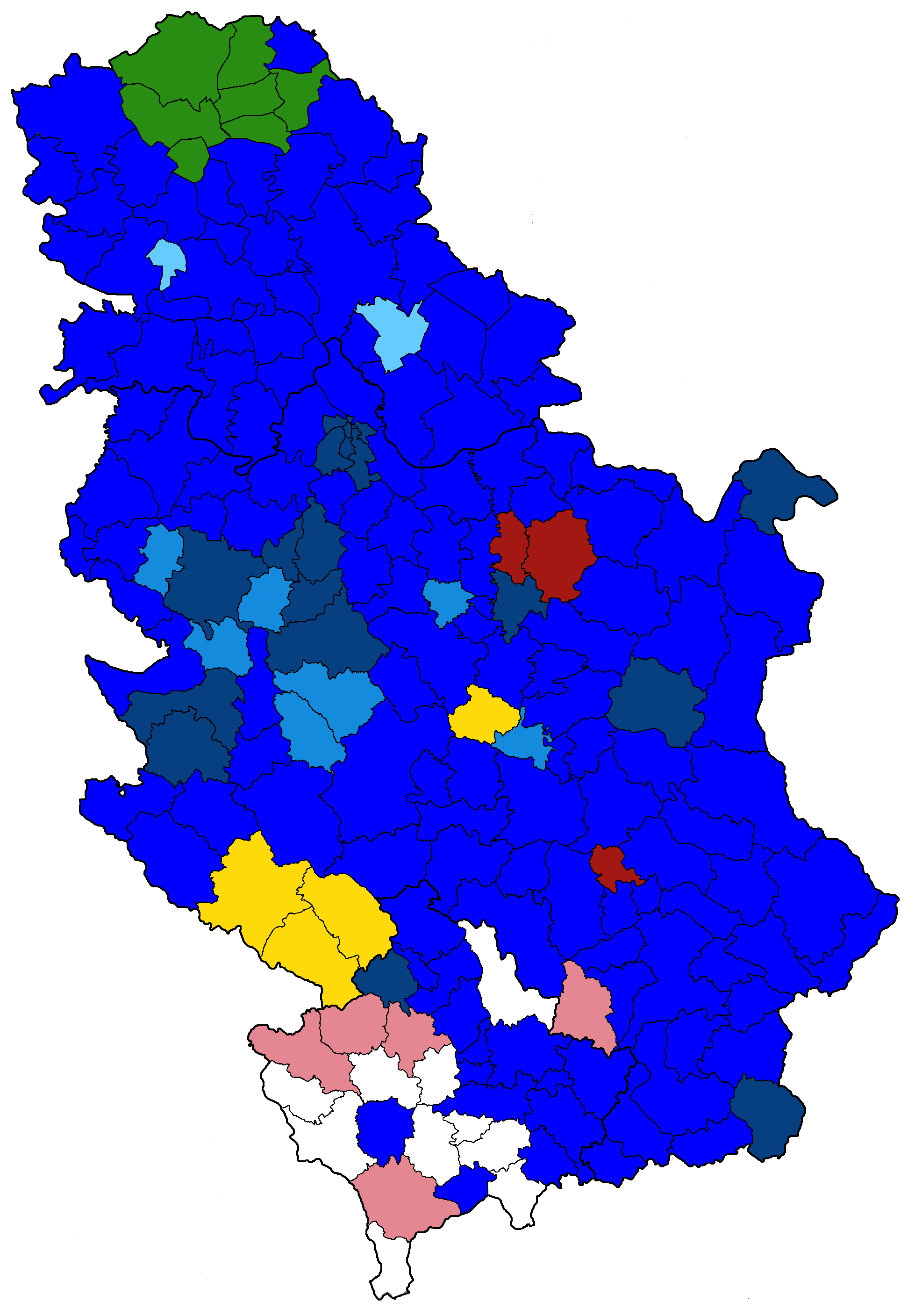
Results by municipalities
SRS DSS DS G17+ SPO–NS SPS ZZT DA
Prime Minister before	Prime Minister after
Zoran Živković; DS	Vojislav Koštunica; DSS

Parliamentary elections were held in Serbia (then a constituent republic within Serbia and Montenegro) on 28 December 2003 to elect members of the National Assembly.

Serbia had been in a state of political crisis since the overthrow of the post-communist ruler, Slobodan Milošević, in 2000. The reformers, led by former Yugoslav President Vojislav Koštunica, have been unable to gain control of the Serbian presidency because three successive presidential elections have failed to produce the required 50% turnout. The assassination in March 2003 of reformist Prime Minister, Zoran Đinđić was a major setback.

At these elections the former reformist alliance, the Democratic Opposition of Serbia (DOS), had broken up into three parts: Koštunica's Democratic Party of Serbia, late Prime Minister Đinđić's Democratic Party and the G17 Plus group of liberal economists led by Miroljub Labus.

Opposing them were the nationalist Serbian Radical Party of Vojislav Šešelj and Milošević's Socialist Party of Serbia (descended from the former Communist Party). At the time of the election, both Šešelj and Milošević were in detention at ICTY, Milošević accused of committing war crimes, Šešelj of inspiring them.

The remaining candidate was the monarchist Serbian Renewal Movement–New Serbia (SPO–NS) coalition, led by Vuk Drašković.

Following the election the three former DOS parties (DSS, DS and G17+) fell two seats short of a parliamentary majority, holding 124 seats between them. After months of coalition talks Koštunica, Labus and Drašković's parties reach an agreement with the outside support of the Socialist Party in March 2004 which enabled Koštunica of the DSS to become prime minister.

== Electoral lists ==
Following electoral lists took part in the 2003 parliamentary election:

No.	Ballot name	Ballot carrier	Main ideology	Political position
1	G17 Plus – Miroljub Labus; G17+, SDP	Mlađan Dinkić	Liberal conservatism	Centre-right
2	Serbian Radical Party – dr Vojislav Šešelj; SRS	Vojislav Šešelj	Ultranationalism	Far-right
3	Democratic Party of Serbia – Vojislav Koštunica; DSS, SLS, SDSS, NDS	Vojislav Koštunica	Conservatism	Centre-right
4	Democratic Alternative – Nebojša Čović; DA	Nebojša Čović	Social democracy	Centre-left
5	Democratic Party – Boris Tadić; DS, GSS, DC, SDU, LZS	Dragoljub Mićunović	Social democracy	Centre-left
6	Serbian Renewal Movement – New Serbia – Vuk Drašković – Velimir Ilić; SPO, NS	Vuk Drašković	Conservatism	Centre-right
7	OTPOR; Otpor	Čedomir Čupić	Anti-corruption	Centre
8	"For National Unity" prof. Borislav Pelević and Marijan Rističević (Party of Serbian Unity, People's Peasant Party, People's Party, Our Home Serbia, Serb Party); SSJ, NSS, NS, NDS, SS	Dragan Marković	National conservatism	Right-wing
9	Socialist Party of Serbia – Slobodan Milošević; SPS	Slobodan Milošević	Socialism	Left-wing
10	Independent Serbia – dr Vladan Batić (Christian Democratic Party of Serbia, Democratic Party "Fatherland", Democratic Movement of Romanians of Serbia, Peasants Party, Serbian Justice); DHSS, DSO, SS, DPRS, SP	Vladan Batić	Christian democracy	Centre
11	Defense and Justice – Vuk Obradović and Borivoje Borović (Social Democracy, People's Party "Justice", Pensioners and Workers' Party, Social Democratic Party of Greens); SD, NSP, SRP, SDPZ	Mila Živojinović	Social democracy	Centre-left
12	Together for Tolerance – Čanak, Kasza, Ljajić; LSV, VMSZ/SVM, SDP, DSHV, LZŠ	Branislav Cole Kovačević	Social democracy	Centre-left
13	Liberals of Serbia – Dušan Mihajlović; LS	Dušan Mihajlović	Liberalism	Centre
14	Reformists – Social Democratic Party of Vojvodina – Serbia, Miodrag Mile Isakov; RV	Mile Isakov	Vojvodina autononism	Centre-left
15	Socialist People's Party – People's Bloc – General Nebojša Pavković; SNS, NB	Dobrivoje Budimirović	Social democracy	Centre-left
16	Business Force of Serbia and the Diaspora – Branko Dragaš PSSD	Zoran Milinković	Economic liberalism	Centre-right
17	Labour Party of Serbia – Dragan Milovanović; LPS	Dragan Milovanović	Social democracy	Centre-left
18	Alliance of Serbs of Vojvodina – Dušan Salatić; SSV	Miroljub Milić	Regionalism	Centre
19	Yugoslav Left – JUL; JUL	Desimir Stanojević	Neocommunism	Far-left

== Results ==
Party	Votes	%	Seats	+/–
Serbian Radical Party	1,056,256	27.98	82	+59
Democratic Party of Serbia coalition	678,031	17.96	53	+8
Democratic Party coalition	481,249	12.75	37	–25
G17 Plus−SDP	438,422	11.61	34	New
Serbian Renewal Movement−New Serbia	293,082	7.76	22	–14
Socialist Party of Serbia	291,341	7.72	22	–15
Together for Tolerance	161,765	4.29	0	–19
Democratic Alternative	84,463	2.24	0	–6
For National Unity	68,537	1.82	0	–10
Otpor	62,545	1.66	0	New
Independent Serbia	45,211	1.20	0	–7
Socialist People's Party	27,596	0.73	0	New
Liberals of Serbia	22,852	0.61	0	0
Reformists – Social Democratic Party of Vojvodina–Serbia	19,464	0.52	0	–4
Defense and Justice	18,423	0.49	0	–9
Business Force of Serbia and the Diaspora	14,113	0.37	0	New
Labour Party of Serbia	4,666	0.12	0	New
Yugoslav Left	3,771	0.10	0	0
Alliance of Serbs of Vojvodina	3,015	0.08	0	New
Total	3,774,802	100.00	250	0
Valid votes	3,774,802	98.70		
Invalid/blank votes	49,755	1.30		
Total votes	3,824,557	100.00		
Registered voters/turnout	6,511,450	58.74		
Source: Republican Electoral Commission
