= New Serbia (political party) =

Political party in Serbia

New Serbia Нова Србија
- Abbreviation: NS
- Leader: Velimir Ilić
- Founded: 10 August 1998; 28 years ago
- Split from: Serbian Renewal Movement
- Headquarters: Obilićev venac 4, Belgrade
- Ideology: Conservatism; Social conservatism; Right-wing populism
- Political position: Right-wing
- Colours: Blue
- National Assembly: 0 / 250
- Assembly of Vojvodina: 0 / 120
- City Assembly of Belgrade: 0 / 110

Website
- nova-srbija.org

New Serbia (Serbian: Нова Србија, romanized: Nova Srbija, NS) is a right-wing political party in Serbia. It was established in 1998 by a group of dissidents led by Velimir Ilić from the Serbian Renewal Movement (SPO).

== History ==
After leaving SPO, Velimir Ilić became a member of SPO-Together.

New Serbia was part of the Democratic Opposition of Serbia (DOS) bloc which defeated Slobodan Milošević in the 2000 presidential election.

The party took part in the 2003 parliamentary election in coalition with the Serbian Renewal Movement. The coalition received 7.7% of the popular vote and 22 seats; 9 seats were allocated to New Serbia.

New Serbia ran in the 2007 election in coalition with the Democratic Party of Serbia (DSS) and United Serbia (JS). The coalition received 16.55% of the popular vote and 47 seats in parliament, 10 of which went to New Serbia.

The party ran again in coalition with the DSS a year later in the 2008 election, receiving 11.62% of votes and 30 seats, with 9 allocated to NS.

New Serbia ran in the 2014 election in coalition with the Serbian Progressive Party (SNS) and several other parties. The coalition received 48.2% of the popular vote and 158 seats in parliament, 6 of which went to New Serbia.

In the Parliamentary Assembly of the Council of Europe, NS was associated with the European People's Party.

== Presidents ==
#	President	Born–died	Term start	Term end
1	Velimir Ilić	1951–	10 August 1998	Incumbent

== Electoral performance ==
=== Parliamentary elections ===
National Assembly of Serbia
Year	Leader	Popular vote	% of popular vote	# of seats	Seat change	Coalitions	Status
2000	Velimir Ilić	2,402,387	64.09%	8 / 250	▲8	DOS	support 2000–01
2000	Velimir Ilić	2,402,387	64.09%	8 / 250	▲8	DOS	opposition 2001–04
2003	Velimir Ilić	293,082	7.66%	9 / 250	▲1	With SPO	government
2007	Velimir Ilić	667,615	16.55%	10 / 250	▲1	With DSS-JS	government
2008	Velimir Ilić	480,987	11.62%	9 / 250	▼1	With DSS	opposition
2012	Velimir Ilić	940,659	24.05%	8 / 250	▼1	SNS coalition	government
2014	Velimir Ilić	1,736,920	48.35%	6 / 250	▼2	SNS coalition	government
2016	Velimir Ilić	1,823,147	48.25%	5 / 250	▼1	SNS coalition	support 2016–17
2016	Velimir Ilić	1,823,147	48.25%	5 / 250	▼1	SNS coalition	opposition 2017–20
2020	Velimir Ilić	7,873	0.24%	0 / 250	▼5	With NSP	no seats
2022	Velimir Ilić	did not participate		0 / 250	0		no seats

=== Presidential elections ===
President of Serbia
Election year	#	Candidate	1st round votes	%	2nd round votes	%	Elected	Notes
2003	▲3rd	Velimir Ilić	229,229	9.08	—	—	Lost	Election declared invalid due to low turnout
2004	▼4th	Dragan Maršićanin	414,971	13.31	—	—	Lost	Government Coalition
2008	▲3rd	Velimir Ilić	305,828	7.43	—	—	Lost	
2012	▲1st	Tomislav Nikolić	979,216	25.05	1,552,063	49.54	Won	Let's Get Serbia Moving coalition
2017	▼4th	Vuk Jeremić	206,676	5.66	—	—	Lost	Independent candidate; support
2022	Did not participate							
