= Siniša Stamenković =

Siniša Stamenković may refer to:

- Siniša Stamenković (Serbian politician, born 1945), Serbian parliamentarian (1993-97) and former mayor of Gadžin Han
- Siniša Stamenković (Serbian politician, born 1949), Serbian parliamentarian (2008-12)
