= Borivoje Drakulović =

Serbian politician (born 1951)

Borivoje Drakulović (Serbian Cyrillic: Боривоје Дракуловић; born 3 September 1951) is a Serbian politician. He served in the Serbian parliament from 2001 to 2004 and held high municipal office in Mali Iđoš between 1999 and 2000. A member of the Socialist Party of Serbia (SPS) during his time as an elected official, Drakulović later joined the far-right Serbian Radical Party (SRS).

Drakulović was a direct participant in the events leading up to Slobodan Milošević's arrest in April 2001, serving as part of Milošević's private security detail.

== Private career ==
Drakulović was a merchant trader and is now retired. He lives in Lovćenac, a predominantly Serb and Montenegrin village in the municipality of Mali Iđoš, which has a Hungarian majority.

He saw action in the 1991–95 Croatian War and was wounded during the Battle of Vukovar.

== Politician ==
=== Local politics in Mali Iđoš ===
Drakulović was elected to Mali Iđoš's municipal assembly for Lovćenac's third division in the May 1992 Serbian local elections, defeating a member of Károly Pál's local political alliance. Pál's group won a majority victory overall, and Pál was chosen afterward as mayor.

During the 1990s, Serbia's political culture was dominated by the authoritarian rule of Socialist Party leader Slobodan Milošević. Most of Serbia's democratic opposition parties boycotted the May 1992 elections, and ongoing doubts about the legitimacy of the vote led to new local elections being held in December 1992. Drakulović was re-elected for Lovćenac's third division in Mali Iđoš. A coalition of opposition parties won a majority victory in the municipality, and Pál was chosen for another term as mayor. Drakulović soon became known for his disruptive behaviour in the local legislature; in June 1993, a Democratic Movement of Serbia (DEPOS) representative referred to his frequent "outbursts" as being more suited to the streets than the assembly chamber. In practice, the local government of Mali Iđoš's functioning in this period depended on co-operation between Pál's predominantly Hungarian alliance and the SPS, which was the dominant party in Lovćenac. Milan Stevović, a member of the Socialists, joined the government in 1994 as president of the executive council.

Drakulović appeared in the twenty-fourth position out of twenty-eight on the Socialist Party's electoral list for Novi Sad in the 1993 Serbian parliamentary election. The party won thirteen seats in the division, and he was not given a mandate. (From 1992 to 2000, Serbia's electoral law stipulated that one-third of parliamentary mandates would be assigned to candidates from successful lists in numerical order, while the remaining two-thirds would be distributed amongst other candidates at the discretion of the sponsoring parties. Drakulović could have been given a mandate despite his list position, though in the event he was not.)

He was again elected to the Mali Iđoš assembly in the 1996 Serbian local elections. The new municipal administration established on 10 December 1996 included representation from the Alliance of Vojvodina Hungarians (VMSZ), the Democratic Fellowship of Vojvodina Hungarians (VMDK), and the Socialists, with Stevović continuing in the role of executive board president.

The opposition Zajedno alliance won the local elections in several major Serbian cities in the 1996 cycle, but its victories were not initially recognized by the Serbian authorities, leading to a series of protests in late 1996 and early 1997. In December 1996, the SPS group in the Mali Iđoš assembly introduced a motion to send a telegram of support to Slobodan Milošević's administration; this was rejected by the Hungarian parties. During the debate, Drakulović said that he would personally retaliate against the "unpatriotic" behaviour of the Hungarian party delegates and that the telegram would be sent irrespective of the outcome of the vote.

Relations between the SPS and the Hungarian parties in the municipal assembly continued to worsen after these events. The SPS brought forward two motions of non-confidence against VMSZ mayor Béla Sipos in late 1998, although these were subsequently withdrawn. On 11 November 1998, the assembly approved a SPS motion to remove Stevović from office, which Stevović accepted. Drakulović then ran for the vacant position of executive board president, but he was not initially successful: he received the support of twelve delegates (i.e., one short of the required majority) in the first vote, and only eleven delegates supported him in a repeat vote. This led to a political impasse that continued until 30 March 1999, when the Hungarian parties reluctantly agreed to accept Drakulović in the role.

The work of the assembly broke down again later in 1999, due to a disagreement between the SPS and the Hungarian parties over a key municipal appointment. The Hungarian parties temporarily withdrew from the assembly, and on 2 September 1999 Sipos submitted his resignation as mayor. The SPS later won the support of a working majority of delegates, and the crisis ended on 21 February 2000 when VMDK delegate János Maronka was chosen as mayor with the support of both the SPS and VMSZ. Drakulović, who was by this time the leader of the local SPS organization, represented the Socialists in difficult negotiations between the parties.

=== The fall of Milošević and after ===
Slobodan Milošević was defeated in the 2000 Yugoslavian presidential election and subsequently fell from power on 5 October 2000, a watershed moment in Serbian politics. Drakulović was re-elected to the Mali Iđoš assembly in the concurrent 2000 Serbian local elections; the VMSZ won a majority victory overall in the municipality, and the SPS served in opposition for the term that followed. Drakulović also ran as the SPS candidate for Mali Iđoš in the 2000 Vojvodina provincial election and was defeated by VMSZ candidate László Horváth.

Soon after his fall from power, Milošević called several SPS officials to his villa in the Belgrade neighbourhood of Dedinje, saying that he needed trustworthy people in the event that the new state authorities chose to take action against him. Drakulović became part of the former president's security detail, living in the compound in the months that followed and bringing a contingent of twenty-seven people from Lovćenac for its defence.

Serbia's government fell after Milošević's defeat in the Yugoslavian election, and a new Serbian parliamentary election was called for December 2000. Serbia's electoral laws were reformed prior to the vote, such that the entire country became a single electoral division and all mandates were assigned to candidates on successful lists at the discretion of the sponsoring parties or coalitions, irrespective of numerical order. Drakulović appeared in the forty-second position on the Socialist Party's list, which was mostly alphabetical, and was assigned a parliamentary mandate after the list won thirty-seven seats. His term began when the assembly convened in January 2001. The Democratic Opposition of Serbia (DOS) coalition won a landslide victory with 176 out of 250 seats, and the Socialists served in opposition for the term that followed. During the 2001–04 parliament, Drakulović served on the committee for labour, veterans, and social affairs.

Slobodan Milošević was arrested by Yugoslavian authorities on 1 April 2001, after an extended standoff at his villa. Drakulović took part in tense negotiations with Serbian Special Operations Unit (JSO) forces prior to the arrest. Twenty years later, he recounted that Milošević, who recognized his position was impossible, initially planned a defiant last stand before changing his mind and agreeing to give himself up to the authorities, telling Drakulović, "Boro, I have no right to take you away from your two sons. I will surrender. We cannot do anything, except to save the lives of these people." Milošević was later extradited to the International Criminal Tribunal for the former Yugoslavia (ICTY) in The Hague. In August 2001, Drakulović took part in a SPS delegation that visited him in detention.

Drakulović appeared in the sixty-seventh position on the SPS's list in the 2003 Serbian parliamentary election. The party fell to twenty-two seats, and he was not given a mandate for a second term. His parliamentary tenure ended when the new assembly convened in January 2004, and he appears to have left the SPS after this time.

He led an independent list called Sloboda in the 2006 election for the Lovćenac village assembly and was elected when the list won a single mandate. By this time, he was a pensioner.

=== Serbian Radical Party ===
After several years out of the political spotlight, Drakulović became the leader of the Radical Party's village organization in Lovćenac. In June 2020, he welcomed party leader Vojislav Šešelj to a campaign event in the community.

Drakulović appeared in the twenty-second position on the Radical Party's electoral list in the 2020 Serbian parliamentary election and the second position on its list for Mali Iđoš in the concurrent 2020 Serbian local elections. In each instance, the list failed to cross the electoral threshold for assembly representation.

== Electoral record ==
=== Provincial (Vojvodina) ===
2000 Vojvodina provincial election: Mali Iđoš
Candidate	Party	First round		Second round	
Candidate	Party	Votes	%	Votes	%
László Horváth (incumbent)	Alliance of Vojvodina Hungarians		finished first		elected
Borivoje Drakulović	Socialist Party of Serbia–Yugoslav Left (Affiliation: Socialist Party of Serbia)		finished second		
Veliša Rudović	Serbian Renewal Movement		finished third		
János Maronka	Democratic Fellowship of Vojvodina Hungarians		finished fourth		
Dr. Mihály Csordás	Citizens' Group				
Miroljub Gajić	Serbian Radical Party				
István Hadadi	Citizens' Group				
Károly Sihelnik	Democratic Party of Vojvodina Hungarians				
Total					
Source: Csordás, Gajić, Hadadi, and Sihelnik are listed alphabetically.

=== Local (Mali Iđoš) ===
2000 Mali Iđoš municipal election: Division 13 (Lovćenac 3)
Candidate	Party	Votes	%
Borivoje Drakulović (incumbent)	Socialist Party of Serbia–Yugoslav Left (Affiliation: Socialist Party of Serbia)		elected
Slavko Rađenović	Democratic Opposition of Serbia (Affiliation: Social Democracy)		
Dejan Radovanović	Serbian Radical Party		
Total			
Source: Rađenović and Radovanović are listed alphabetically.

1996 Mali Iđoš municipal election: Division 13 (Lovćenac 3)
Candidate	Party	Votes	%
Borivoje Drakulović (incumbent)	Socialist Party of Serbia		elected
other candidates?			
Total			

December 1992 Mali Iđoš municipal election: Division 13 (Lovćenac 3)
Candidate	Party	Votes	%
Borivoje Drakulović (incumbent)	Socialist Party of Serbia		elected
other candidates?			
Total			

May 1992 Mali Iđoš municipal election: Division 13 (Lovćenac 3)
Candidate	Party	Votes	%
Borivoje Drakulović	Socialist Party of Serbia		elected
Predrag Pejović	Citizens' Group		defeated
Total			
