= Vladimir Zaharijev =

Serbian politician

Vladimir Zaharijev (Serbian Cyrillic: Владимир Захаријев; born 5 October 1962) is a Serbian politician from the country's Bulgarian community. He is one of Serbia's longest-serving mayors, having been the mayor of Bosilegrad in the country's southeastern corner on a continuous basis since 2001. He was also a member of the Serbian parliament from 2004 to 2007 and the president of Serbia's Bulgarian National Council from 2014 to 2018.

A member of the Democratic Party of Serbia (DSS) for many years, Zaharijev is now the leader of To Smo Mi, a national minority party of the Bulgarian community.

He is known for projecting a larger-than-life personality and has attained a certain notoriety on YouTube for videos of his dancing at public ceremonies and weddings.

== Early life and career ==
Zaharijev was born in Bosilegrad, in what was then the People's Republic of Serbia in the Federal People's Republic of Yugoslavia. His biography indicates that he earned a degree from the Faculty of Natural Sciences (at an unspecified institution) and received the title of "Expert in the Field of Natural and Technical Sciences." He has worked as a programmer and was a private entrepreneur in the 1990s.

== Politician ==
=== Mayor and parliamentarian ===
==== Democratic Party of Serbia ====
Zaharijev first became the mayor of Bosilegrad following the off-year 2001 local elections, in which the Democratic Party of Serbia won a majority victory with eighteen out of thirty-one seats in the municipal assembly.

He received the thirty-fourth position on the DSS's electoral list in the 2003 Serbian parliamentary election and was given a national assembly mandate when the list won fifty-three seats. (From 2000 to 2011, Serbian parliamentary mandates were awarded to sponsoring parties or coalitions rather than to individual candidates, and it was common practice for the mandates to be assigned out of numerical order. Zaharijev was not automatically elected by virtue of his list position.) He took his seat when the assembly convened in January 2004.

The DSS emerged from the 2003 election as the leading party in Serbia's coalition government, and Zaharijev served in parliament as a government supporter. He was a member of the foreign affairs committee and the committee on interethnic relations.

Serbia introduced the direct election of mayors with the 2004 local election cycle. Zaharijev was re-elected as mayor of Bosilegrad, winning a landslide victory in the second round of voting.

He appeared in the 101st position on a combined list of the DSS and New Serbia (NS) in the 2007 Serbian parliamentary election. The list won forty-seven seats, and he was not given a mandate for a second term. In the 2008 parliamentary election, he received the seventy-first position on a follow-up DSS–NS list and again did not receive a mandate when the alliance fell to thirty seats.

The direct election of mayors proved to be a short-lived experiment and was abandoned with the 2008 Serbian local elections, which were held concurrently with the parliamentary vote. Since this time, mayors have been chosen by the elected members of Serbia's city and municipal assemblies. The DSS won a majority victory in Bosilegrad with nineteen of thirty-one seats in 2008, and Zaharijev was chosen for a third term as mayor. He remarked on this occasion that it was "better in Bosilegrad than in the [national] assembly."

Serbia's electoral system was reformed in 2011, such that all mandates were awarded to candidates on successful lists in numerical order. Zaharijev appeared in the eighty-ninth position on the DSS's list in the 2012 parliamentary election; election from this position was not a realistic possibility, and he was not elected when the list won twenty-one seats. He also led the DSS's list for Bosilegrad in the concurrent 2012 Serbian local elections and received a fourth term as mayor when the party won another majority victory with eighteen seats.

Zaharijev received the sixty-first position on the DSS's list in the 2014 parliamentary election. On this occasion, the list fell below the electoral threshold for assembly representation.

==== To Smo Mi ====
Zaharijev established a new political party called To Smo Mi prior to the 2016 local elections. There were conflicting reports on whether he actually left the DSS at this time; some media coverage claimed that he did, though he responded that the DSS's constitution permitted him to establish a separate political movement for a national minority community. In any event, To Smo Mi effectively absorbed the DSS organization in Bosilegrad and won twenty-one out of thirty-one seats in the 2016 local elections. He continued to serve as mayor afterward.

For the 2020 Serbian local elections, Zaharijev brought his party into an alliance with the Serbian Progressive Party (SNS). The alliance won an overwhelming victory in Bosilegrad with thirty out of thirty-one seats, and he was chosen afterward for a sixth mayoral term. He maintained the SNS alliance into the 2024 local elections and further extended his mayoral tenure when the alliance again won thirty seats.

In 2024, he identified his main accomplishments as mayor as developing the local infrastructure (including roads), improving healthcare by establishing cooperation with the military medical academies of Serbia and Bulgaria, improving social protection for vulnerable citizens, and accepting migrants from war-torn countries.

=== Bulgarian National Council ===
The state union of Serbia and Montenegro introduced a number of national minority councils in 2003, including one for the Bulgarian community; when the state union dissolved in 2006, it was renamed as the Bulgarian National Council of Serbia. During this time, delegates were chosen by electoral colleges of prominent community members and academics. Zaharijev served as a member of the Bulgarian council in this period.

Serbia introduced direct elections for most national minority councils, including the Bulgarian council, in 2010. Zaharijev fielded a list called For Our Bosilegrad, which finished a close second against the Bulgarian Community for a European Serbia list led by Zoran Petrov of Dimitrovgrad. Petrov was chosen as council president on 3 July 2010. Four years later, Zaharijev's list defeated Petrov's in a rematch. The council formed a "unity administration" after the election, with Zaharijev as president and Petrov as one of its vice-presidents.

Zaharijev led the To Smo Mi list to a landslide victory in the 2018 council election, winning seventeen out of nineteen seats. He stood down as council president in December 2018 and was replaced by Stefan Stojkov.

Zaharijev's list won another majority victory in the 2022 council election, taking thirteen seats. He continues to serve as a council member and, while no longer president, maintains a strong degree of influence over its activities. In 2024, he listed his main achievements as moving the council to Bosilegrad for the first time, protecting threatened Bulgarian language media outlets, and improving access to Bulgarian language education.

== Electoral record ==
=== Local (Bosilegrad) ===
2004 Bosilegrad municipal election: Mayor of Bosilegrad
Candidate	Party	First round		Second round	
Candidate	Party	Votes	%	Votes	%
Vladimir Zaharijev	Democratic Party of Serbia			3,117	77.83
Mile Milenov	Democratic Party			888	22.17
other candidates					
Total				4,005	100.00
