= Zoran Petrov =

Politician in Serbia

Member of the National Assembly of the Republic of Serbia
- In office 14 February 2007 – 31 May 2012

President of the Bulgarian National Council of Serbia
- In office 3 July 2010 – 24 November 2014
- Preceded by: Angel Josifov
- Succeeded by: Vladimir Zaharijev

Personal details
- Born: August 8, 1965 Dimitrovgrad, SR Serbia, SFR Yugoslavia
- Died: 8 April 2024 (aged 58)
- Political party: DS (1997–2013); ZZS (2013–22); Zajedno! (2022–24)

Zoran Petrov (Serbian Cyrillic: Зоран Петров; 8 August 1965 – 8 April 2024) was a Serbian politician from the country's Bulgarian national minority community. He was a member of the Serbian parliament from 2007 to 2012, the leader of Serbia's Bulgarian National Council from 2010 to 2014, and the deputy mayor of Dimitrovgrad from 2012 to 2015. Petrov was a member of the Democratic Party (DS) from 1997 to 2013, when he joined the breakaway Together for Serbia (ZZS) party.

== Early life and career ==
Petrov was born in Dimitrovgrad, in what was then the Socialist Republic of Serbia in the Socialist Federal Republic of Yugoslavia. He was an economist and was at different times a customs officer and a technical manager at Radio-Television Caribrod.

== Politician ==
=== Democratic Party ===
==== Early years (1997–2007) ====
Petrov joined the Democratic Party in 1997. In 2001, he became a member of the party's main board and president of its municipal board in Dimitrovgrad. He was elected to the Dimitrovgrad municipal assembly in the off-year 2001 Serbian local elections and afterward served as the leader of the party's assembly group. (During this period, the DS was part of a broader alliance called the Democratic Opposition of Serbia (DOS). The DOS won ten seats in the Dimitrovgrad municipal assembly in 2001, finishing second against a local citizens' group called "Caribrod.")

Serbia adopted a system of proportional representation for local elections with the 2004 election cycle. The DS won seven out of twenty-nine seats in Dimitrovgrad in that year, winning a plurality victory, and afterward formed a coalition government with the Democratic Party of Serbia (DSS) and other parties. Petrov was re-elected to the assembly and served on the municipal council (i.e., the executive branch of the local government).

==== Parliamentarian (2007–2012) ====
Petrov appeared in the 187th position on the Democratic Party's electoral list in the 2007 Serbian parliamentary election and was awarded a mandate when the list won sixty-four seats. (From 2000 to 2011, Serbian parliamentary mandates were awarded to sponsoring parties or coalitions rather than to individual candidates, and it was common practice for the mandates to be assigned out of numerical order. Petrov's low position on the list, which was in any event mostly alphabetical, did not prevent his election.) The DS formed an unstable coalition government with the DSS and G17 Plus after the election; Petrov served as a government supporter and was a member of the committee on submissions and proposals.

The DS–DSS alliance broke down in early 2008, and a new parliamentary election was held in May of that year. The DS contested the election at the head of an alliance called For a European Serbia (ZES). Petrov received the 167th position on the ZES list and was given a mandate when the list won 102 seats. The overall results of the election were inconclusive, but ZES eventually formed a coalition government with the Socialist Party of Serbia (SPS), and Petrov continued to serve as a government supporter. In his second term, he was a member of the economic reform committee and the committee on submissions and proposals, a deputy member of the local government committee, the leader of Serbia's parliamentary friendship group with Bulgaria, and a member of the friendship groups with Austria, Norway, Portugal, Spain, and Tunisia.

Petrov was also re-elected to the Dimitrovgrad municipal assembly in the 2008 Serbian local elections, which were held concurrently with the parliamentary vote, when the ZES alliance won twelve seats.

==== Deputy Mayor of Dimitrovgrad (2012–13) ====
Serbia's electoral system was reformed in 2011, such that all mandates were awarded to candidates on successful lists in numerical order. Petrov received the ninety-first position on the DS's Choice for a Better Life list in the 2012 parliamentary election and was not re-elected when the list won sixty-seven seats.

He was re-elected to the Dimitrovgrad municipal assembly in the 2012 Serbian local elections, which were again held concurrently with the parliamentary vote, when the Democratic Party won thirteen seats. Vladica Dimitrov, also of the Democratic Party, was chosen as mayor after the election, and Petrov became deputy mayor.

=== Together for Serbia/Together! (2013–2024) ===
==== Deputy Mayor of Dimitrovgrad (2013–2015) ====
The Democratic Party split in early 2013, with Dušan Petrović forming a breakaway group called Together for Serbia. Petrov joined the new party in March 2013, bringing eight of the thirteen DS members of the local assembly with him. Dimitrovgrad's local government was restructured in April 2013, with Nebojša Ivanov of the Democratic Party of Bulgarians succeeding Dimitrov as mayor. Together for Serbia was part of the new governing coalition, and Petrov continued to serve as deputy mayor.

Together for Serbia contested the 2014 Serbian parliamentary election on a coalition list led by former Serbian president Boris Tadić, who was at the time the leader of the New Democratic Party (NDS). Petrov appeared in the 115th position on the coalition's list. Election from this position was not a realistic possibility, and he was not elected when the list won eighteen seats.

Dimitrovgrad's municipal government was restructured again in January 2015, and Zoran Đurov of the Serbian Progressive Party (SNS) succeeded Ivanov as mayor. Petrov was dismissed as deputy mayor at this time.

==== Later years (2015–2024) ====
Together for Serbia contested the 2016 Serbian parliamentary election on a coalition list led by the Democratic Party. Petrov appeared on the fifty-fifth position and was not elected when the coalition won sixteen seats. The DS and ZSS also fielded a coalition list in Dimitrovgrad in the concurrent local elections; Petrov led the list and was re-elected when the list won four seats. The Serbian Progressive Party won the election, and Petrov served in opposition for the term that followed.

The ZZS party boycotted the 2020 Serbian parliamentary election and the concurrent 2020 Serbian local election in Dimitrovgrad, charging unfair electoral conditions under the Progressive Party's leadership. Petrov's term in the local assembly came to an end.

The election boycott ended in 2022, and Together for Serbia contested that year's parliamentary election as part of the We Must (Moramo) coalition. Petrov appeared in the sixtieth position of the coalition's list and was not elected when the list won thirteen seats.

Together for Serbia was restructured as the Together! party in June 2022, and Petrov served as the new party's secretary-general.

In 2023, Together! joined a broader coalition called Serbia Against Violence (SNV). Petrov led the coalition's list for Dimitrovgrad in the off-year 2023 local elections and was re-elected to the local assembly when the list won five seats. The Progressives and their allies won a majority government, and Petrov again served in opposition. He was also a nominal candidate in the 2023 Serbian parliamentary election, appearing in the 237th position on the SNV list, which won sixty-five seats.

=== Bulgarian National Council ===
The state union of Serbia and Montenegro introduced a number of national minority councils in 2003, including one for the Bulgarian community; when the state union dissolved in 2006, it was renamed as the Bulgarian National Council of Serbia. During this time, delegates were chosen by electoral colleges of prominent community members and academics. Petrov served as a member of the Bulgarian council.

Serbia introduced direct elections for most national minority councils, including the Bulgarian council, in 2010, and in that year Petrov's Bulgarian Community for a European Serbia list won a narrow victory over a rival list led by Vladimir Zaharijev. Petrov was chosen as council president on 3 July 2010.

He criticized Serbia's proposed new law on information and media in August 2014, saying it did not provide for the survival of media outlets in the country's minority committees.

Zaharijev's list defeated Petrov's list in the 2014 national council election. Zaharijev became the council's new president in November 2014, and Petrov was reassigned as one of its vice-presidents. He did not seek re-election in 2018.

== Death ==
Petrov died on 8 April 2014. An article in the local journal FAR described him as "a man who dedicated his entire life to advancing democracy and democratic processes, both in Dimitovgrad and throughout Serbia."
