= Ognjen Mihajlović =

Serbian politician

Ognjen Mihajlović (Serbian Cyrillic: Огњен Михајловић; born 6 October 1960) is a journalist and politician in Serbia. He has served in the National Assembly of Serbia and the Assembly of Serbia and Montenegro as a member of the far-right Serbian Radical Party (Srpska radikalna stranka, SRS).

== Private career ==
Mihajlović was a journalist with Televizija Sarajevo in Sarajevo, Bosnia and Herzegovina, prior to the Bosnian War (1992–95). During the war, he provided war correspondence from Otes that was sympathetic to the Army of Republika Srpska. He has also been the editor of the Radical Party journal Velika Srbija.

He is married to Ljiljana Mihajlović, who is also a prominent figure in the SRS.

== Politician ==
Mihajlović ran for the City Assembly of Belgrade in the 2000 Serbian local elections; he lost to Dušan Rakić of the Democratic Opposition of Serbia (Demokratska opozicija Srbije, DOS) in Zemun's second division. He subsequently appeared in the 217th position on the SRS's electoral list for the 2000 Serbian parliamentary election. The list won twenty-two mandates, and he was not included in the party's assembly delegation. (From 2000 to 2011, Serbian parliamentary mandates were awarded to sponsoring parties or coalitions rather than to individual candidates, and it was common practice for mandates to be assigned out of numerical order. Mihajlović could have been awarded a mandate despite his low position on the list, though in the event he was not.)

He appeared in the forty-fifth position on the Radical Party's list in the 2003 parliamentary election. The list won eighty-two mandates, and on this occasion he was chosen for its delegation. Although the SRS won more seats than any other party in this election, it fell well short of a majority and ultimately served in opposition. Mihajlović's first term in the national assembly was in any event brief. By virtue of its performance in the 2003 parliamentary election, the Radical Party had the right to appoint thirty members to the federal assembly of Serbia and Montenegro; Mihajlović was included in the party's federal delegation and resigned from the national assembly on 12 February 2004.

He appeared in the fourteenth position on the SRS's list for the municipal assembly of Zemun in the 2004 Serbian local elections. The party won twenty-six seats in the municipality, although he did not take a mandate.

The federal assembly ceased to exist in 2006 when Montenegro declared independence. Mihajlović was given the twenty-third position on the SRS's list in the 2007 Serbian parliamentary election and returned to the national assembly after the list won eighty-one seats. The SRS again won more seats than any other party in this election, fell well short of a majority, and served in opposition.

Mihajlović again appeared on the SRS's list in the 2008 parliamentary election and was selected for a third assembly term after the list won seventy-eight mandates. While the election results were initially inconclusive, the SRS ultimately remained in opposition. The party experienced a serious split later in the year, with several members joining the more moderate Serbian Progressive Party (Srpska napredna stranka, SNS) under the leadership of Tomislav Nikolić and Aleksandar Vučić. Mihajlović remained with the Radicals. In 2009, he was appointed to Serbia's delegation to the Interparliamentary Assembly on Orthodoxy.

Serbia's electoral system was reformed in 2011, such that mandates were awarded in numerical order to candidates on successful lists. Mihajlović received the fiftieth position on the SRS's list in the 2012 parliamentary election. The list did not receive enough votes to cross the electoral threshold to win representation in the assembly.

After leaving parliament, Mihajlović worked as the Belgrade correspondent for Radio Televizija Republike Srpske.

=== Local (City Assembly of Belgrade) ===
2000 City of Belgrade election Zemun Division II
Svetko Lazović	Workers' Party of Yugoslavia	
Željko Mitrović	Socialist Party of Serbia–Yugoslav Left (Affiliation: Yugoslav Left)	
Ognjen Mihajlović	Serbian Radical Party	
Ljubiša Popović	Serbian Renewal Movement	
Dušan Rakić	Democratic Opposition of Serbia	Elected
Branko Čičić	Natural Law Party	
