= Milan Stevović =

Serbian politician

Milan Stevović (Serbian Cyrillic: Милан Стевовић; born 9 April 1962) is a Serbian lawyer, administrator, and former politician. He served in the Serbian parliament from 2004 to 2007 and was the mayor of Požega from 2004 to 2008. In 2012, he began working as a Secretary of State in Serbia's justice ministry. At one time a member of the far-right Serbian Radical Party (SRS), he later joined the Serbian Progressive Party (SNS).

== Early life and private career ==
Stevović was born in Požega, in what was then the People's Republic of Serbia in the Federal People's Republic of Yugoslavia. He graduated from the University of Belgrade Faculty of Law in 1985, earned a master's degree from the same institution, and later received a Ph.D on the topic ""Establishment and Analysis of Facts in Traffic Accidents." He worked for eight years as a judge in Požega and began operating his own law practice in 1995.

== Politician ==
=== Serbian Radical Party ===
Stevović appeared in the third position on the Radical Party's electoral list for the Užice constituency in the 2000 Yugoslavian parliamentary election. The list did not win any seats in the division. He also ran in Požega's seventh division in the concurrent 2000 Serbian local elections; like all Radical Party candidates in the municipality during this cycle, he was defeated.

Stevović appeared in the eighty-eighth position on the Radical Party's list in the 2003 Serbian parliamentary election and was assigned a mandate after the list won eighty-two seats. (From 2000 to 2011, all mandates in Serbian parliamentary elections were awarded to candidates on successful lists at the discretion of the sponsoring parties or coalitions, irrespective of numerical order. Stevović's relatively low position on the list had no specific bearing on his changes of election.) He took his seat when the new parliament convened in January 2004. In the assembly, he was a member of the committee for constitutional affairs, the committee for local self-government, the committee for culture and information, and the committee for labour, veterans, and social affairs. Although the Radicals emerged from the 2003 elections as the largest party in the assembly, they fell well short of a majority and ultimately served in opposition for the term that followed.

Stevović was also elected as the mayor of Požega in the 2004 Serbian local elections, in which mayors were directly elected. He served in the role for the next four years.

For the 2007 Serbian parliamentary election, Stevović appeared in the 133rd position on the Radical Party's list. The Radicals won eighty-one seats, and he was not given a mandate for a second term. The direct election of mayors proved to be a short-lived experiment and was abolished with the 2008 Serbian local elections. Although the Radicals won a narrow victory in Požega in the 2008 local cycle, Stevović stood down as mayor after the election and was replaced by another member of his party.

=== Serbian Progressive Party ===
The Radicals experienced a serious split in late 2008, with several prominent members joining the more moderate Serbian Progressive Party under the leadership of Tomislav Nikolić and Aleksandar Vučić. Stevović was among those who joined the Progressives.

Serbia's electoral laws were reformed in 2011, such that all mandates in election held under proportional representation were given to candidates on successful lists in numerical order. Stevović appeared in the 122nd position on the Progressive Party's Let's Get Serbia Moving list for the 2012 Serbian parliamentary election and was not elected when the list won seventy-three seats. He was elected to the Požega municipal assembly as a SNS candidate in the concurrent 2012 Serbian local elections.

The Progressives won the 2012 parliamentary election and subsequently formed a coalition government with the Socialist Party of Serbia (SPS) and other parties. In October 2012, Stevović was appointed as Director of the Directorate for the Execution of Criminal Sanctions within the ministry of justice and public administration. In October 2018, he was reassigned as acting director of the Directorate for the Management of Seized Assets. He was still in the latter role as of 2025.

== Electoral record ==
=== Local (Požega) ===
2004 Požega municipal election: Mayor of Požega (second round results)
Candidate	Party	Votes	%
Milan Stevović Bane	Serbian Radical Party	4,422	52.52
Nada Krstić	Democratic Party	3,997	47.48
Total		8,419	100.00

2000 Požega municipal election: Division 7
Candidate	Party	Votes	%
Milan Stevović	Serbian Radical Party		defeated
other candidates			
Total			
