= Slađan Radovanović =

Serbian politician

Slađan Radovanović (Serbian Cyrillic: Слађан Радовановић; born 18 October 1964) is a politician in Serbia. He was the mayor of Rača from 2000 to 2004, held high municipal office in neighbouring Kragujevac from 2004 to 2014, and was a member of both the National Assembly of Serbia and the Assembly of Serbia and Montenegro. For most of his time as an elected official, Radovanović was a member of the Serbian Renewal Movement (Srpski pokret obnove, SPO).

== Private career ==
Radovanović was born in Rača, in what was then the Socialist Republic of Serbia in the Socialist Federal Republic of Yugoslavia. Raised in the village of Veliko Krčmare, he graduated from the Faculty of Teacher Education in Jagodina and worked at the Jovan Popović elementary school in Kragujevac from 1986 to 2000.

== Politician ==
The 2000 Serbian local elections were generally disastrous for the SPO, with the party losing much of its support base to the Democratic Opposition of Serbia (Demokratska opozicija Srbije, DOS). In Rača, the SPO and DOS ran a coordinated campaign, with both sides withholding candidates in certain divisions to prevent vote-splitting. The result was a rare majority victory for the SPO; Radovanović was chosen as mayor after the election with DOS support.

DOS candidate Vojislav Koštunica defeated Slobodan Milošević in the 2000 Yugoslavian presidential election, which took place concurrently with the local elections. This event prompted widespread changes in Serbian and Yugoslavian politics; among many other things, the government of Serbia resigned, and a new Serbian parliamentary election was called for December 2000. Radovanović appeared in the 166th position on the SPO's electoral list, which did not cross the threshold to win representation in the assembly. (From 2000 to 2011, mandates in Serbian parliamentary elections were awarded to successful parties or coalitions rather than individual candidates, and it was common practice for the mandates to be assigned out of numerical order. Radovanović's list position had no formal bearing on his chances of election, although the list's failure to cross the threshold made the issue moot in any case.)

The SPO contested the 2003 parliamentary election in an alliance with New Serbia (Nova Srbija, NS), and Radovanović was given the 149th position on their combined list. The list won twenty-two mandates, and Radovanović was chosen as part of the SPO delegation when the assembly convened in January 2004. His term was brief. By virtue of its performance in the parliamentary election, the SPO–NS alliance had the right to appoint eight members to the federal assembly of Serbia and Montenegro. Radovanović was appointed as one of the SPO's federal delegates and so resigned his seat in the republican assembly. In May 2004, he was appointed to the federal parliament's commission for control of the state union's security services.

Radovanović's term as mayor of Rača came to an end in late 2004. His political ally Veroljub Stevanović was elected as mayor of Kragujevac in the 2004 Serbian local elections, and Radovanović was subsequently appointed as Kragujevac's chief expert for regional and interregional cooperation.

The SPO suffered a serious split in 2005, and several members – including Stevanović and Radovanović – were expelled from the party. It is probable that Radovanović followed Stevanović in joining the breakaway Serbian Democratic Renewal Movement (Srpski Demokratski Pokret Obnove, SDPO), although online sources do not confirm this point.

The State Union of Serbia and Montenegro dissolved in 2006 when Montenegro declared independence, and Radovanović's term in the federal assembly came to an end accordingly.

Veroljub Stevanović was chosen for a new term as mayor of Kragujevac after the 2008 local elections, and Radovanović was promoted to assistant mayor with responsibility for regional and interregional cooperation. He remained in this role until 5 September 2014.

In 2020, Radovanović became a member of Healthy Serbia (Zdrava Srbija, ZS) and served on its main board. Healthy Serbia contested the 2020 Serbian parliamentary election in an alliance with Better Serbia (Bolja Srbija, BS), and Radovanović appeared in the ninety-eighth position on the combined list of the parties. The list did not cross the electoral threshold to win assembly representation.
