= Sreto Perić =

Serbian politician

- Срето Перић

Member of the National Assembly of the Republic of Serbia
- In office 3 June 2016 – 3 August 2020
- In office 27 January 2004 – 31 May 2012

Personal details
- Born: 23 September 1959 (age 66) Srebrenica, PR Bosnia and Herzegovina, FPR Yugoslavia
- Party: SRS
- Education: Faculty of Law
- Alma mater: University of Sarajevo
- Occupation: Politician

Sreto Perić (Serbian Cyrillic: Срето Перић; born 23 September 1959) is a Serbian politician. He has served four terms in the Serbian parliament and held high municipal office in Ljubovija. Perić is a member of the far-right Serbian Radical Party (SRS).

== Early life and career ==
Perić was born in Srebrenica, in what was then the People's Republic of Bosnia and Herzegovina in the Federal People's Republic of Yugoslavia. After graduating from the University of Sarajevo Faculty of Law, he worked for the brake device company Feros in Srebrenica and was director of general personnel and procurement affairs for the company Diva in Valjevo, Serbia.

== Politician ==
=== Early years and first parliamentary terms ===
Perić was the Radical Party's candidate for Ljubovija's twenty-first division in the 2000 Serbian local elections. Like all SRS candidates in the municipality, he was defeated. This was the last local election cycle in which candidates were elected for single-member constituencies; all subsequent elections have been held under proportional representation.

Perić appeared in the twenty-eighth position on the Radical Party's electoral list in the 2003 Serbian parliamentary election and was given a mandate when the list won eighty-two seats. (From 2000 to 2011, Serbian parliamentary mandates were awarded to sponsoring parties or coalitions rather than to individual candidates, and it was common practice for the mandates to be assigned out of numerical order. Perić was not automatically elected by virtue of his list position.) Although the Radicals won more seats than any other party in this election, they fell well short of a majority and ultimately served in opposition for the term that followed. In his first assembly term, Perić was a member of the legislative committee.

Serbia introduced the direct election of mayors with the 2004 local elections. Perić was the Radical Party's candidate in Ljubovija and was eliminated in the first round of voting. This notwithstanding, he was also one of six SRS candidates elected in the concurrent municipal assembly election. The Socialist Party of Serbia (SPS) won the election and afterward formed a coalition government that included the Radicals; Perić was appointed as a member of the municipal council (i.e., the executive branch of the local government). His position was jeopardized in 2007–08, when two rival coalitions claimed to have a majority of seats in the assembly.

Perić received the seventy-third position on the Radical Party's list in the 2007 parliamentary election and was again chosen for a mandate when the list won eighty-one seats. As in 2003, the Radicals won more seats than any other party, fell short of a majority, and served in opposition; a coalition of the Democratic Party (DS), the Democratic Party of Serbia (DSS), and G17 Plus came to power. Perić served on the legislative committee, the committee for justice and administration, and the committee for Kosovo and Metohija.

The coalition government formed after the 2007 election was unstable and collapsed in early 2008, leading to a new parliamentary election in May of that year. Perić appeared in the ninety-eighth position on the SRS list and was again included in his party's delegation after the list won seventy-eight seats. The overall results of the election were inconclusive, and the Radicals afterward held discussions with the DSS and the Socialists about forming a new coalition government. This ultimately did not happen. The Socialists instead joined a coalition government led by the For a European Serbia (ZES) alliance, and the Radicals remained in opposition. In his third term, Perić was a member of the legislative committee, the committee for science and technological development, and the parliamentary friendship group with Russia.

The direct election of mayors proved to be a short-lived experiment and was abandoned with the 2008 Serbian local elections, which took place concurrently with the parliamentary vote. Perić was one of five SRS members elected to the Ljubovija assembly. The DS formed a new government in the municipality, and the Radicals served in opposition. In 2009, during a heated debate over the legitimacy of the local government, Perić threw and broke a microphone in front of the president of the assembly.

The Radical Party experienced a serious split in late 2008, with several prominent members joining the more moderate Serbian Progressive Party (SNS) under the leadership of Tomislav Nikolić and Aleksandar Vučić. Perić remained with the Radicals. In April 2010, he was elected as a member of the party's presidency.

Serbia's electoral system was reformed in 2011, such that all parliamentary mandates were awarded to candidates on successful lists in numerical order. Perić was given the twenty-third position on the Radical Party's list for the 2012 parliamentary election. Weakened by the split four years earlier, the party fell below the electoral threshold for assembly representation, and Perić lost his seat. The Radicals also fell below the threshold in Ljubovija in the concurrent 2012 local elections.

=== Politics at the republic level since 2012 ===
Perić was promoted to the nineteenth position on the Radical Party's list in the 2014 Serbian parliamentary election, in which the party again fell below the electoral threshold.

He received the fourteenth position on the party's list for the 2016 parliamentary election and was elected to a fourth assembly term when the list won twenty-two seats. The Serbian Progressive Party and its allies won a majority victory, and the Radicals once again served in opposition. In his fourth term, Perić was a member of the judiciary committee, (Note: Formally known as the Committee on the Judiciary, Public Administration, and Local Self-Government.) a deputy member of spatial planning committee, (Note: Formally known as the Committee on Spatial Planning, Transport, Infrastructure, and Telecommunications.) a member of the commission for the control of the execution of criminal sanctions, and a member of the friendship groups with Belarus, Kazakhstan, Slovakia, Spain, and Venezuela.

In 2019, he took part in a Radical Party delegation to Srebrenica to commemorate Serbs who died in the area during the last two wars (i.e., World War II and the Yugoslav Wars of the 1990s).

Perić appeared in the sixteenth position on the Radical Party's list in the 2020 parliamentary election, the tenth position in the 2022 parliamentary election, and the eighth position in the 2023 parliamentary election. In each instance, the list failed to cross the electoral threshold.

=== Politics at the local level since 2012 ===
The Radical Party won two seats in Ljubovija in the 2016 Serbian local elections. Perić, who appears to have led the party's list, was re-elected to the local assembly and served for the term that followed.

He led the SRS list for Ljubovija in the 2020 local elections and was re-elected when the list won a single seat. He resigned from the assembly on 21 April 2021 and served afterward as an assistant to the mayor, overseeing the St. Michael's Village Meeting events in the municipality.

He again led the party's list in the 2023 local elections and was again elected when the list won one seat. This time, he resigned his seat on 25 January 2024, when the new assembly convened. He was again appointed as an assistant to the mayor and once again oversaw the St. Michael's Village Meeting events in August and September 2024.

== Electoral record ==
=== Local (Ljubovija) ===
2004 Ljubovija municipal election: Mayor of Ljubovija
Candidate	Party	First round		Second round	
Candidate	Party	Votes	%	Votes	%
Vidoje Jovanović (incumbent)	Socialist Party of Serbia			3,286	52.24
Zoran Nikolić	Democratic Party			3,004	47.76
Sreto Perić	Serbian Radical Party				
other candidates					
Total				6,290	100.00

2000 Ljubovija municipal election: Division 21
Candidate	Party
Sreto Perić (DEFEATED)	Serbian Radical Party
other candidates	
Total
