= Miomir Tadić =

Serbian politician

Miomir Tadić (Serbian Cyrillic: Миомир Тадић; born 29 November 1954) is a former politician in Serbia. He was the mayor of Topola from 2000 to 2004 and served in the National Assembly of Serbia for much of the same period, initially with New Serbia (Nova Srbija, NS) and later as an independent.

== Private career ==
Tadić is an electrical engineer.

== Politician ==
New Serbia joined the Democratic Opposition of Serbia (Demokratska opozicija Srbije, DOS), a broad and ideologically diverse coalition of parties opposed to Slobodan Milošević's administration, in 2000. The DOS won a landslide majority victory in Topola in the 2000 Serbian local elections with thirty-two out of forty seats. Tadić elected to the local assembly and was chosen afterward as its president, a position that was at the time equivalent to mayor.

DOS candidate Vojislav Koštunica defeated Slobodan Milošević in the 2000 Yugoslavian presidential election, which took place concurrently with the local elections. This event prompted widespread changes in Serbian and Yugoslavian politics; among other things, Serbia's government fell and a new parliamentary election was called for December 2000. Tadić appeared in the 184th position on the DOS's electoral list. The list won a landslide majority victory with 176 out of 250 seats; Tadić was not initially elected but received a mandate on 9 April 2001 as the replacement for another DOS representative. (From 2000 to 2011, mandates in Serbian parliamentary elections were awarded to successful parties or coalitions rather than individual candidates, and it was common practice for the mandates to be assigned out of numerical order. Tadić's list position had no formal bearing on whether or when he received a mandate.) In parliament, he served as a member of the health and family committee.

New Serbia withdrew its support for Serbia's government in late 2002. In December of that year, Tadić and two other party delegates went against the party's wishes and remained in the assembly for a budget vote, allowing the government to maintain quorum. They were subsequently expelled from the party. In January 2003, they created a new assembly group with two delegates from smaller parties who had previously been aligned with the Party of Serbian Unity (Stranka srpskog jedinstva, SSJ). This group did not remain united, and by the end of his parliamentary term Tadić was not a member of any parliamentary club.

He was not a candidate in the 2003 Serbian parliamentary election and his term as mayor ended in late 2004.
