= Vidoje Jovanović =

Serbian politician (born 1961)

Vidoje Jovanović (Serbian Cyrillic: Видоје Јовановић; born 3 August 1961) is a Serbian politician and administrator. He was the mayor of Ljubovija from 2000 to 2008 and served in the Serbian parliament from 2007 to 2008. Jovanović is a member of the Socialist Party of Serbia (SPS).

== Early life and private career ==
Jovanović was born in the village of Vrhpolje in the municipality of Ljubovija, in what was then the People's Republic of Serbia in the Federal People's Republic of Yugoslavia. He was educated at the University of Belgrade Faculty of Security Studies and has worked as a professor. He worked at the secretariat for national defence from 1986 to 1991, oversaw the defense department in Ljubovija between 1991 and 1993, and was head of the defense department in the federal ministry of defense from 1994 to 2000.

Jovanović became head of the Ljubovija operations center in the Serbian ministry of internal affairs in 2014. In June 2023, he was promoted to head of the operations center in Šabac. He also works for Yugoimport SDPR.

== Politician ==
=== Mayor and parliamentarian ===
Jovanović appeared in the seventh position (out of seven) on the Socialist Party's electoral list for the Valjevo division in the 1997 Serbian parliamentary election. The Socialists won three seats in the division, and he was not assigned a mandate. (From 1992 to 2000, Serbia's electoral law stipulated that one-third of parliamentary mandates would be assigned to candidates from successful lists in numerical order, while the remaining two-thirds would be distributed amongst other candidates at the discretion of the sponsoring parties. Jovanović could have been given a mandate despite his list position, but he was not.)

The Socialist Party dominated Serbian and Yugoslavian politics from 1990 to 2000 under the authoritarian leadership of Slobodan Milošević. Milošević was defeated in the 2000 Yugoslavian presidential election, a watershed moment in Serbian politics. The Socialists also lost the concurrent 2000 Serbian local elections in most major urban centres. In Ljubovija, a smaller community on the border with Bosnia and Herzegovina, the Socialists won a majority victory and remained in power. Jovanović was chosen after the election as president of the local assembly, a position that was at the time equivalent to mayor.

The Serbian government fell after Milošević's defeat in the Yugoslavian election, and a new Serbian parliamentary election was called for December 2000. Prior to the election, Serbia's electoral laws were reformed such that the entire country became a single electoral division and all mandates were assigned to candidates on successful lists at the discretion of the sponsoring parties or coalitions, irrespective of numerical order. Jovanović appeared in the seventy-ninth position on the SPS's list. The party won thirty-seven seats, and he was not given a mandate. He later appeared in the hundredth position on the party's list for the 2003 parliamentary election and was not given a mandate when the list won twenty-two seats.

Serbia introduced the direct election of mayors for the 2004 local elections, and Jovanović was re-elected as mayor of Ljubovija.

For the 2007 parliamentary election, Jovanović appeared in the 103rd position on the SPS's list. The party won sixteen seats, and, on this occasion, he was given a mandate. The Democratic Party (DS), Democratic Party of Serbia (DSS), and G17 Plus formed an unstable coalition government after the election, and the Socialists served in opposition. During his assembly term, Jovanović served on the committee for local self-government. There was initially some controversy over his ability to hold a dual mandate as a mayor and parliamentarian, though ultimately he was able to serve in both roles. In his last year as mayor, two rival coalitions claimed to hold a majority in the local assembly. As a directly elected mayor, Jovanović's position in the local government was not in jeopardy.

=== Since 2008 ===
Serbia's coalition government fell apart in early 2008, and a new parliamentary election was held in May of that year. Jovanović was given the 102nd position on the SPS list and did not receive a mandate for a new term when it won twenty seats. The overall results of the election were inconclusive, and the Socialists afterward held discussions with the Democratic Party of Serbia and the Serbian Radical Party (SRS) about forming a new coalition government. This ultimately did not happen, and the Socialists instead joined a coalition government led by the For a European Serbia (ZES) alliance.

The direct election of mayors proved to be a short-lived experiment and was abandoned with the 2008 local elections, which were held concurrently with the parliamentary vote. In Ljubovija, the Socialist Party's alliance won the election but fell short of a majority. Initially, the second-place Democratic Party formed a new coalition government, and the Socialists moved into opposition. Following a political realignment in 2009, the Socialists re-entered government in a coalition with the DS. Jovanović served as an assistant to the mayor from 2009 to 2012.

Serbia's electoral system was reformed in 2011, such that all mandates were awarded to candidates on successful lists in numerical order. The SPS's alliance won the 2012 Serbian local elections in Ljubovija, and Jovanović was appointed as deputy mayor. After 2014, he again served as assistant to the mayor.

Jovanović appeared in the 110th position on the Socialist Party's list in the 2014 Serbian parliamentary election and was not elected when the list won forty-four seats. He was re-elected to the Ljubovija local assembly in the 2016 local elections and resigned in either 2017 or 2018.

Jovanović appeared in the third position on the SPS's list for Ljubovija in the 2020 local elections and was re-elected when the list won nine seats. He was not sworn in afterward and appears to have declined his mandate. In early 2023, he was identified as chair of the municipal staff in Ljubovija's local administration. He was a nominal candidate in the 2023 local elections, appearing in the twenty-sixth position out of twenty-seven on the SPS list, and was not elected when the list won ten seats.

== Electoral record ==
=== Local (Ljubovija) ===
2004 Ljubovija municipal election: Mayor of Ljubovija
Candidate	Party	First round		Second round	
Candidate	Party	Votes	%	Votes	%
Vidoje Jovanović (incumbent)	Socialist Party of Serbia			3,286	52.24
Zoran Nikolić	Democratic Party			3,004	47.76
Sreto Perić	Serbian Radical Party				
other candidates					
Total				6,290	100.00
