= Ljiljana Zdravković =

Serbian politician

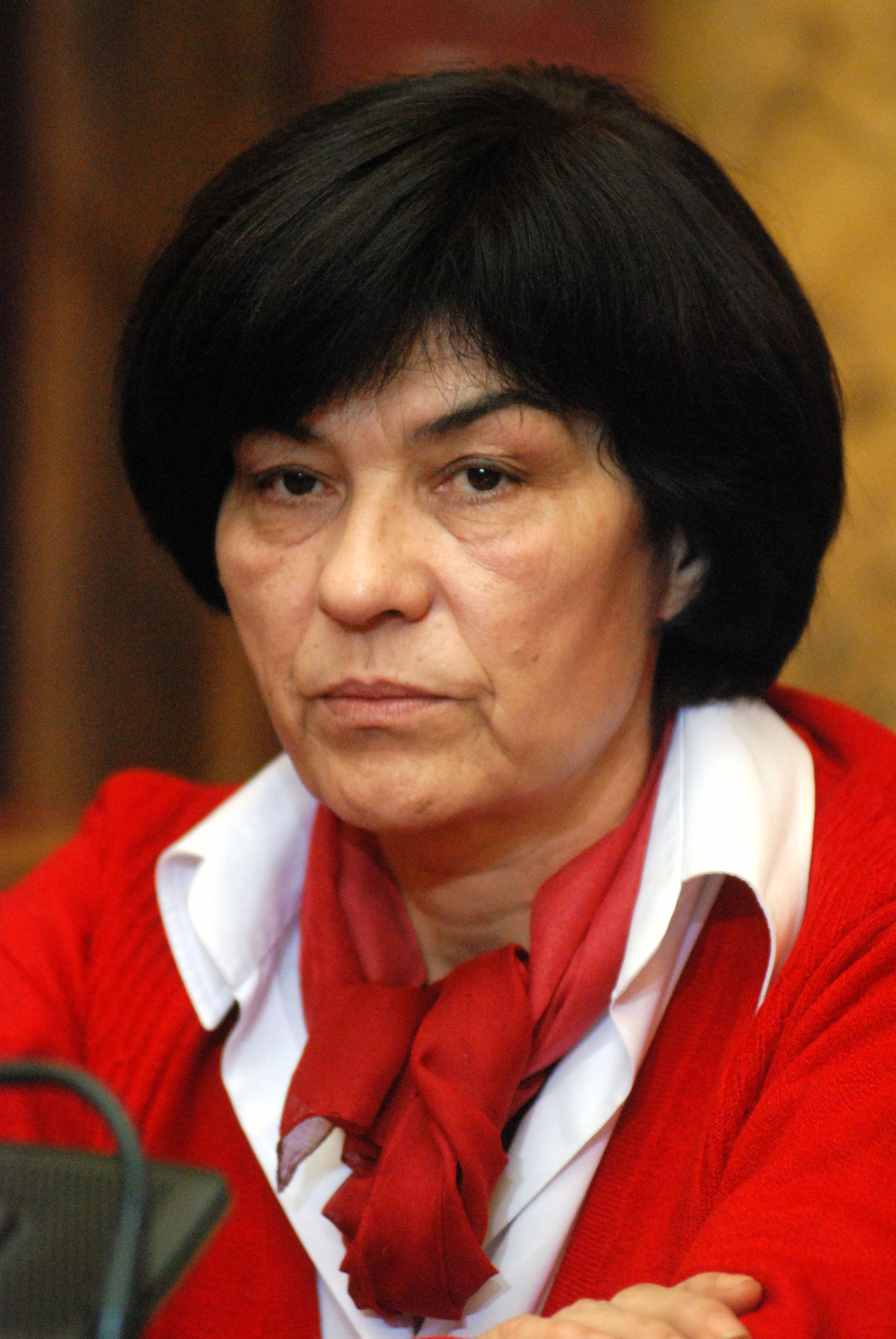
Ljiljana Zdravković in 2009.

Ljiljana Zdravković (Serbian Cyrillic: Љиљана Здравковић; born 1950) is a politician in Serbia. She served in the National Assembly of Serbia for most of the period from 2007 to 2012, as a member of the Democratic Party (Demokratska stranka, DS). She later joined the breakaway Social Democratic Party (Socijaldemokratska stranka, SDS).

== Early life and career ==
Zdravković was born in the village of Gornja Trešnjevica (at the time part of the Lazarevac municipality), in what was then the People's Republic of Serbia in the Federal People's Republic of Yugoslavia. She trained as an electrical engineer and was the leading engineer in research and development at RB Kolubara in Lazarevac, which was amalgamated into Belgrade in 1971.

== Political career ==
=== Municipal and city representative ===
Zdravković joined the DS in 2000 and held a number of party leadership positions in Lazarevac and Belgrade. She was elected to the Lazarevac municipal assembly in the 2000 Serbian local elections and was chosen as president of the assembly the following year (at the time, this position was equivalent to mayor of the municipality). In the 2004 local elections, she was both re-elected to the Lazarevac assembly and elected as a DS representative in the Assembly of the City of Belgrade. She was not a candidate for re-election in the 2008 local elections.

=== Member of the National Assembly ===
Zdravković received the eighty-sixth position on the DS's electoral list in the 2007 Serbian parliamentary election. The list won sixty-four mandates, and she was subsequently included in the party's assembly delegation. (From 2000 to 2011, parliamentary mandates were awarded to sponsoring parties or coalitions rather than to individual candidates, and the mandates were often distributed out of numerical order. Zdravković's relatively low list position had no bearing on whether she received a mandate.) The DS formed an unstable coalition government with the rival Democratic Party of Serbia (Demokratska stranka Srbije, DSS) after the election, and Zdravković served as a supporter of the ministry.

The DS–DSS coalition broke down in early 2008, and a new election was called for May of that year. Zdravković received the fifty-second position on the DS's For a European Serbia list, which won 102 mandates. She was not initially included in her party's delegation but was awarded a mandate on 17 December 2008 as a replacement for Jagoda Jorga. The For a European Serbia alliance formed a new coalition government with the Socialist Party of Serbia after the election, and Zdravković again served as a government supporter. She was appointed to the environmental protection committee in 2010.

Serbia's electoral system was reformed in 2011, such that parliamentary mandates were awarded in numerical order to candidates on successful lists. Zdravković received the 198th position on the DS's Choice for a Better Life list and was not re-elected when the list won sixty-seven mandates. She also appeared in the (largely ceremonial) final position on the DS's list in Lazarevac in the concurrent 2012 local elections, and was not elected to the municipal assembly.

=== Since 2012 ===
The Democratic Party experienced a serious split in early 2014, with Boris Tadić setting up a breakaway group initially called the New Democratic Party. The party contested the 2014 parliamentary election in a fusion with the Greens of Serbia and in alliance with other parties. Zdravković sided with Tadić in the split and appeared in the thirty-ninth position on the list; she was not elected when it won eighteen mandates. She also appeared on Tadić's list for the Belgrade City Assembly in the concurrent 2014 Belgrade city election; the list did not cross the electoral threshold to win representation. The New Democratic Party was reconstituted as the SDS later in the year.

For the 2016 parliamentary election, the SDS ran in an alliance with the Liberal Democratic Party and the League of Social Democrats of Vojvodina. Zdravković received the seventh-sixth position on their combined list and was again not returned when it won only thirteen seats. She also appeared in the lead position on the SDS's list for Lazarevac in the 2016 local elections; the list did not cross the electoral threshold.

The SDS, the DS, and other parties joined for a coalition list in the 2018 Belgrade city election. Zdravković appeared in the forty-second position on the list, which once again failed to cross the electoral threshold.
