= László Horváth (Serbian politician) =

Serbian politician

László Horváth (Serbian: Ласло Хорват, Laslo Horvat; 1942–2019) was a Serbian politician from the country's Hungarian community. He was the mayor of Mali Iđoš from 2001 to 2004 and served in the Vojvodina provincial assembly from 1996 and 2004. Horváth was at different times a member of the Democratic Fellowship of Vojvodina Hungarians (VMDK) and the Alliance of Vojvodina Hungarians (VMSZ).

== Early life and private career ==
Horváth was born in Mali Iđoš, which had been annexed to Hungary in 1941 but which was returned to Serbia in 1944. Raised in the Federal People's Republic of Yugoslavia after World War II, he attended the secondary music school in Subotica and the University of Novi Sad's Academy of Arts, worked in Mali Iđoš as a music teacher, and began working for Novi Sad Radio as a music director and producer in 1974.

== Politician ==
=== Democratic Fellowship of Vojvodina Hungarians ===
Horváth was the leader of the VMDK in Mali Iđoš in the early 1990s. In this period, the political culture of Serbia was dominated by the authoritarian rule of Socialist Party of Serbia (SPS) leader Slobodan Milošević and his allies. In May 1992, Horváth joined with other opposition leaders in the municipality to protest against the conscription of local citizens to serve in the Bosnian War.

Horváth was elected to the Mali Iđoš assembly in the May 1992 Serbian local elections, winning without opposition in Mali Iđoš village's third constituency. For this election, the local opposition parties – the VMDK, the Reform Democratic Party of Vojvodina (RDSV), the Democratic Party (DS), and the Democratic Movement of Serbia (DEPOS) alliance – agreed to run a joint slate of candidates. Since all of the aforementioned parties except the VMDK were technically boycotting the elections, all candidates in the alliance ran as independents. The opposition won a narrow majority of seats, and Károly Pál, the local leader of the RDSV, was chosen as mayor on 15 June 1992.

The elections held in May 1992 were widely seen as lacking legitimacy due to the opposition boycott, and a new round of local elections took place in December 1992 with the opposition's participation. The VMDK, RDSV, and DEPOS maintained their coalition in Mali Iđoš and won an increased majority victory. Horváth was re-elected for Mali Iđoš village's third seat, once again without opposition. Horváth also appeared in the tenth position (out of twelve) on the VMDK's electoral list for the Novi Sad division in the December 1992 Yugoslavian parliamentary election. The party won a single seat in the division, which was automatically assigned to its lead candidate, Béla Csorba.

When the new local assembly met on 19 January 1993, the SPS nominated Horváth for mayor, presumably in a bid to split the alliance. He declined the nomination, and Károly Pál was chosen for a second term in office. On 8 February 1993, Horváth was named as a member of the municipality's executive council. In practice, the local government's functioning depended on co-operation between Pál's alliance and the SPS, which was the dominant party in the municipality's Serb communities; a member of the Socialists was chosen to lead the executive council in 1994.

=== Alliance of Vojvodina Hungarians ===
The VMDK experienced a serious split in 1994, with several prominent members leaving the party to form the Alliance of Vojvodina Hungarians. Horváth joined the new organization, as did Károly Pál, who left the RDSV during this time. When the local branch of the VMSZ was established on 25 May 1995, Horváth was chosen as president and Pál as vice-president.

Horváth was elected to the Vojvodina assembly in the 1996 provincial election, winning the Mali Iđoš constituency seat in the second round of voting. The Socialists won a majority victory in the election, and Horváth served in opposition for the term that followed. He was also re-elected to the Mali Iđoš assembly in the concurrent 1996 local elections. Both the VMSZ and the Socialists won nine seats in the municipal assembly, and the VMSZ ultimately formed a new coalition government that included both the Socialists and the third-place VMDK. Béla Sipos of the VMSZ was chosen as mayor, and Horváth was again appointed as a member of the executive council.

Between 1998 and 2000, Mali Iđoš's municipal administration was threatened on two occasions by serious disputes between the Hungarian parties and the Socialists. One dispute involved local SPS leader's Borivoje Drakulović's ultimately successful bid to become president of the executive council, and the other involved a disagreement over a municipal appointment that led to the temporary withdrawal of the Hungarian parties from the assembly and to Sipos's resignation as mayor. Horváth represented the VMSZ in difficult inter-party negotiations during both controversies.

In 2000, the VMSZ joined the Democratic Opposition of Serbia (DOS), a coalition of parties opposed to Slobodan Milošević's continued rule. DOS candidate Vojislav Koštunica defeated Milošević in the 2000 Yugoslavian presidential election, and Milošević subsequently fell from power on 5 October 2000.

The VMSZ fielded its own slate of candidates in the 2000 Vojvodina provincial election, which took place concurrently with the Yugoslavian vote, running in an electoral alliance with the other DOS parties. Horváth was re-elected without difficulty in Mali Iđoš as the DOS–VMSZ alliance won a landslide majority overall, taking almost every seat in the provincial assembly. He served as a supporter of the administration for the next four years.

He was also elected to a fourth term in the Mali Iđoš assembly in the 2000 Serbian local elections, as the VMSZ won a clear majority victory in the municipality overall. Béla Sipos was appointed afterward for another term as mayor, Károly Pál became president of the executive council, and on 7 December 2000 Horváth was chosen as deputy mayor.

Béla Sipos died unexpectedly on 23 September 2001, and Horváth was appointed as his successor on 27 November 2001. He served in this role for just over two years before resigning on 13 February 2004, against the backdrop of divisions within the VMSZ. He did not seek re-election at either the provincial or the local level in 2004 and did not return to political life after this time.

== Death ==
Horváth died in May 2019.

== Electoral record ==
=== Provincial (Vojvodina) ===
2000 Vojvodina provincial election: Mali Iđoš
| Candidate | Party | First round | | Second round | |
| Candidate | Party | Votes | % | Votes | % |
|---|---|---|---|---|---|
| László Horváth (incumbent) | Alliance of Vojvodina Hungarians | | finished first | | elected |
| Borivoje Drakulović | Socialist Party of Serbia–Yugoslav Left (Affiliation: Socialist Party of Serbia) | | finished second | | |
| Veliša Rudović | Serbian Renewal Movement | | finished third | | |
| János Maronka | Democratic Fellowship of Vojvodina Hungarians | | finished fourth | | |
| Dr. Mihály Csordás | Citizens' Group | | | | |
| Miroljub Gajić | Serbian Radical Party | | | | |
| István Hadadi | Citizens' Group | | | | |
| Károly Sihelnik | Democratic Party of Vojvodina Hungarians | | | | |
| Total | | | | | |
Source: Csordás, Gajić, Hadadi, and Sihelnik are listed alphabetically.

1996 Vojvodina provincial election: Mali Iđoš
| Candidate | Party | First round | | Second round | |
| Candidate | Party | Votes | % | Votes | % |
|---|---|---|---|---|---|
| László Horváth | Alliance of Vojvodina Hungarians | 1,915 | | | elected |
| Dragoljub Žmukić | Socialist Party of Serbia | 1,635 | | | finished second |
| János Maronka | Democratic Fellowship of Vojvodina Hungarians | 1,608 | | | |
| other candidates | | | | | |
| Total | | | | | |

=== Local (Mali Iđoš) ===
2000 Mali Iđoš municipal election: Division 9 (Mali Iđoš village 9)
| Candidate | Party | Votes | % |
|---|---|---|---|
| László Horváth (incumbent for Division 3) | Alliance of Vojvodina Hungarians | | elected |
| Ferenc Barcsik | Democratic Fellowship of Vojvodina Hungarians | | |
| József Toth | Citizens' Group | | |
| Györgyi Világos | Socialist Party of Serbia–Yugoslav Left | | |
| Total | | | |
Source: All candidates except Horváth are listed alphabetically.

1996 Mali Iđoš municipal election: Division 3 (Mali Iđoš village 3)
| Candidate | Party | Votes | % |
|---|---|---|---|
| László Horváth (incumbent) | Alliance of Vojvodina Hungarians | | elected in the first round |
| Total | | | |

December 1992 Mali Iđoš municipal election: Division 3 (Mali Iđoš village 3)
| Candidate | Party | Votes | % |
|---|---|---|---|
| László Horváth (incumbent) | Reform Democratic Party of Vojvodina–Democratic Fellowship of Vojvodina Hungarians (Affiliation: Democratic Fellowship of Vojvodina Hungarians) | | elected without opposition |
| Total | | | |

May 1992 Mali Iđoš municipal election: Division 3 (Mali Iđoš village 3)
| Candidate | Party | Votes | % |
|---|---|---|---|
| László Horváth | Citizens' Group | | elected without opposition |
| Total | | | |
