= Željko Ožegović =

Serbian politician

Željko Ožegović (Serbian Cyrillic: Жељко Ожеговић; born 16 October 1962) is a politician in Serbia. He was the mayor of New Belgrade (a municipality in the City of Belgrade) from 2000 to 2008 and later served in the executive branches of both the Serbian government and the City of Belgrade government. He was also briefly a member of the National Assembly of Serbia in 2002. During his time as an elected official, Ožegović was a member of the Democratic Party (Demokratska stranka, DS).

== Early life and career ==
Ožegović was born in Belgrade, in what was then the People's Republic of Serbia in the Federal People's Republic of Yugoslavia. He graduated from the University of Belgrade Faculty of Economics and worked in the private sector before entering political life.

== Politician ==
=== Mayor of New Belgrade and parliamentarian ===
Ožegović entered political life as a member of the DS. He was elected to the New Belgrade municipal assembly in the 1996 Serbian local elections as a candidate of the Zajedno (English: Together) alliance, a coalition of parties opposed to the authoritarian rule of Slobodan Milošević. Zajedno won the election for the City Assembly of Belgrade, but their victory was not initially recognized by the authorities; Ožegović, who was not elected to the city assembly in this cycle, took part in protests against the Milošević government and was arrested on two occasions. Milošević's Socialist Party of Serbia ultimately formed a new coalition government in New Belgrade following the election, and Ožegović served in opposition in the term that followed.

The DS participated in the 2000 Serbian local elections as a part of the Democratic Opposition of Serbia (DOS) coalition, which won landslide victories in both the city of Belgrade and the municipality of New Belgrade. Ožegović was re-elected to the New Belgrade assembly and also elected to the Belgrade city assembly as a DOS candidate. He was chosen as president of the municipal assembly in New Belgrade after the election; at the time, this position was equivalent to mayor. In 2001, Transparency International recognized New Belgrade as having the "best new municipal leadership".

The 2000 local elections were held concurrently with the 2000 Yugoslavian general election, which brought about the downfall of the Milošević administration. Serbia subsequently held a new parliamentary election in December 2000, and Ožegović appeared in the 167th position out of 250 on the DOS's electoral list. The DOS won a landslide victory in this election with 176 seats; Ožegović was not, however, initially given a mandate when the assembly met in January 2001. (From 2000 to 2011, mandates in Serbian parliamentary elections were assigned to candidates on successful lists at the discretion of the sponsoring parties and coalitions, irrespective of numerical order. Ožegović did not automatically receive a mandate by virtue of his list position.)

Several members of the national assembly voluntarily resigned or were deprived of their mandates on 12 June 2002, amid the backdrop of serious divisions between the DOS and the Democratic Party of Serbia (Demokratska stranka Sribje, DSS). Ožegović was awarded a mandate as the replacement for another member and served, in this capacity, as part of the administration's parliamentary majority. The resignations and expulsions of 12 June 2002 were later overturned on a technicality; the delegates who left the assembly on that day had their mandates restored, and the mandates of the replacements were revoked. Ožegović later appeared on the DS's lists in the 2003, 2007 and 2008 parliamentary elections, although he was not awarded a mandate on any of these occasions.

Serbia introduced proportional representation for local elections in 2004 and also separated the positions of the mayor and assembly president. The DS fielded its own lists in the 2004 Serbian local elections. Ožegović led the DS"s list in New Belgrade and was re-elected when the list won a plurality victory with twenty-eight out of sixty-seven seats. He also received the seventh position on the DS's list in Belgrade and was re-elected when the list won thirty-four seats. He was confirmed for a second term as mayor of New Belgrade following the election.

=== Member of the Belgrade City Council ===
Ožegović did not seek re-election in New Belgrade in 2008, although he appeared on the DS-led For a European Belgrade list at the city level. The results of the 2008 Belgrade election were initially inconclusive, although For a European Serbia eventually formed an administration with the Socialist Party of Serbia. Ožegović was not given an assembly mandate but was instead appointed to the Belgrade city council (i.e., the executive branch of the city government) in December 2008 and served in this role for the term that followed.

Serbia's electoral system was reformed in 2011, such that mandates were awarded to candidates on successful lists in numerical order. Ožegović received the twelfth position on the DS's Choice for a Better Belgrade list and was re-elected to the assembly when the list won a plurality victory with fifty seats. He also received the second position on the party's list for New Belgrade (after Aleksandar Šapić) and was re-elected when the list won thirty-one mandates. He was re-appointed to another term on the city council and so resigned both assembly mandates soon thereafter. He served on council until 24 September 2013, shortly before the defeat of Dragan Đilas's city administration.

He also served as president of the board for the Belgrade International Book Fair during this time.

=== Council of Europe ===
Ožegović was a member of the Congress of Local and Regional Authorities in the Council of Europe from 2004 to 2013. He led the delegation from Serbia and Montenegro in the 2006–07 term and led Serbia's delegation from 2007 to 2013.

=== Mayoral candidate in Belgrade ===
Ožegović left the DS in early 2014 and joined the Liberal Democratic Party (Liberalno demokratska partija, LDP). He appeared in the lead position on the latter party's electoral list in the 2014 Belgrade City Assembly election and in this role was the party's candidate for mayor. While he ran a high-profile campaign, the party ultimately fell below the electoral threshold to win representation in the city assembly.

=== State Secretary ===
Ožegović was appointed as a state secretary in Serbia's ministry of public administration and local self-government in May 2014. The ministry was run by a non-party "expert" in this period, and Ožegović was appointed as a non-partisan representative. In October 2014, he indicated that he would make it easier for citizens to obtain municipal documents electronically via the national portal eUprava. He was also active in targeting Serbia's gray economy, particularly in areas such as tobacco sales. He remained in the ministry until 2017.

== Electoral record ==
=== Local (City Assembly of Belgrade) ===
2000 City of Belgrade election New Belgrade Division VII
Ivan Bakić	Serbian Renewal Movement	
Paja Momčilov	Serbian Radical Party	
Željko Ožegović	Democratic Opposition of Serbia	Elected
Dejan Stjepanović	Socialist Party of Serbia–Yugoslav Left	
