= Radmilo Milošević =

Serbian politician (born 1951)

Radmilo Milošević (Serbian Cyrillic: Радмило Милошевић; born 3 February 1951) is a politician in Serbia. He served in the National Assembly of Serbia from 2001 to 2008 and was also the mayor of Aranđelovac from 2000 to 2004. During his time as an elected official, Milošević was a member of the Democratic Party of Serbia (Demokratska stranka Srbije, DSS).

== Private career ==
Milošević is a graduated electrical engineer.

== Politician ==
=== Early years (1993–2000) ===
Miloševič appeared in the fifth position on the DSS's electoral list for Kragujevac in the 1993 Serbian parliamentary election. The party won two seats in the division, and he did not receive a mandate. (From 1992 to 2000, Serbia's electoral law stipulated that one-third of parliamentary mandates would be assigned to candidates from successful lists in numerical order, while the remaining two-thirds would be distributed amongst other candidates on the lists at the discretion of the sponsoring parties. It was common practice for the latter mandates to be awarded out of order. Milošević's could have received a mandate despite his list position, but he did not.)

The DSS later participated in the Zajedno (English: Together) opposition alliance in the 1996 Yugoslavian parliamentary election, and Milošević appeared in the second position on the alliance's list in Kragujevac. Zajedno won a single seat in the division, which went to lead candidate Zoran Simonović.

=== Mayor and parliamentarian ===
In 2000, the DSS joined the Democratic Opposition of Serbia (Demokratska opozicija Srbije, DOS), a broad and ideologically diverse coalition of parties opposed to Slobodan Milošević's administration. The DOS won a majority victory in Aranđelovac in the 2000 Serbian local elections; Milošević was elected to the local assembly and was chosen afterward as mayor. He served for a full term and stood down from the role in 2004.

Slobodan Milošević was defeated by DOS candidate Vojislav Koštunica in the 2000 Yugoslavian presidential election, which occurred concurrently with the local elections. This event prompted large-scale changes in Serbian and Yugoslavian politics; among other things, Serbia's government stood down after Koštunica's victory after a new Serbian parliamentary election was called for December 2000. For this election, the entire country was counted as a single electoral division, and all mandates were assigned to candidates on successful lists at the discretion of the sponsoring parties and coalitions, irrespective of numerical order. Radmilo Milošević was given the seventy-third position on the DOS list; the list won a landslide majority with 176 out of 250 seats, and he was given a mandate when the assembly convened in January 2001. He served on the privatization committee and the committee on petitions and proposals.

The DSS ultimately became estranged from other parties in the DOS, and it formally left the alliance and moved into |opposition in 2002. The parliamentary mandates of several DSS members, including Milošević, were nullified at the discretion of the DOS on 12 June 2002. This decision was subsequently revoked and the mandates restored.

Milošević received the forty-ninth position on the DSS's list in the 2003 parliamentary election. The list won fifty-three mandates, and he was again included in his party's assembly delegation. The DSS emerged as the main party in Serbia's coalition government after the election, and Milošević again served as an administration supporter. In his second term, he served on the industry committee and the privatization committee. He expressed surprise and disappointment at Branko Pavlović's dismissal as director of Serbia's privatization agency in July 2004.

For the 2007 parliamentary election, the DSS formed an electoral alliance with New Serbia (Nova Srbija, NS). Milošević appeared in their seventy-seventh position on the combined list and was again given a mandate when the list won forty-seven seats. The DSS formed an unstable government with the rival Democratic Party (Demokratska stranka, DS) after the election, and Milošević remained a supporter of the government. He was promoted to deputy chair of the industry committee and remained on the privatization committee.

The DSS–DS coalition broke down in early 2008, and a new parliamentary election was called for May of that year. The DSS maintained its electoral alliance with New Serbia, and Milošević appeared in the seventy-sixth position on their list. The list fell to thirty seats, and he was not given a new mandate. He does not appear to have sought a political comeback after this time.
