= Ljiljana Mihajlović =

Serbian politician

- Љиљана Михајловић

Member of the National Assembly of the Republic of Serbia
- In office 3 June 2016 – 3 August 2020

Member of the City Assembly of Belgrade
- In office 26 November 2004 – 14 July 2008

Personal details
- Born: Ljiljana Mijoković; 5 September 1965 (age 60) Zagreb, SR Croatia, SFR Yugoslavia
- Party: SRS
- Spouse: Ognjen Mihajlović

Ljiljana Mihajlović (née Mijoković; Serbian Cyrillic: Љиљана Михајловић, née Мијоковић; born 5 September 1965) is a Serbian politician. She served in the Serbian parliament from 2016 to 2020 as a member of the far-right Serbian Radical Party (SRS).

== Early life and private career ==
Mihajlović was born in Zagreb, in what was then the Socialist Republic of Croatia in the Socialist Federal Republic of Yugoslavia. An economist, she left Croatia at the start of the Yugoslav Wars in 1991 and moved to Belgrade. She lives in Zemun, one of Belgrade's constituent municipalities, and is married to Ognjen Mihajlović, who is also a prominent figure in the Radical Party.

Mihajlović joined the Radical Party in 1993. She was chief of staff for party leader Vojislav Šešelj from 1996 until 2002, when Šešelj went to The Hague to face war crimes charges at the International Criminal Tribunal for the Former Yugoslavia (ICTY). After his departure, she acted in the same capacity for deputy leader Tomislav Nikolić.

In 1997, Mihajlović was awarded the lease on a Zemun apartment that had previously belonged to a Croatian family. The family had resided in the apartment since 1966 and only discovered they had lost their lease after returning from a vacation. Their eviction occurred during Vojislav Šešelj's tenure as mayor of Zemun; Šešelj presented it to the public as a "victory over the Ustaše." Many understood it as a provocation, intended to stoke existing inter-communal tensions. Mihajlović's lease agreement has been the subject of a protracted legal battle.

== Politician ==
=== Early years (2000–12) ===
Mihajlović ran for the Zemun municipal assembly in the 2000 Serbian local elections and was defeated. This was this last local election cycle in Serbia in which members were elected for single-member constituencies; all subsequent cycles have taken place under a system of proportional representation.

The 2000 local elections took place concurrently with the 2000 Yugoslavian presidential election, in which longtime authoritarian leader Slobodan Milošević fell from power after being defeated by Vojislav Koštunica. The Serbian government also fell after Milošević's defeat and a new Serbian parliamentary election was called for December 2000. Mihajlovič received the 189th position on the Radical Party's electoral list; the list won twenty-three seats, and she was not chosen for a mandate. (From 2000 to 2011, Serbian parliamentary mandates were awarded to sponsoring parties or coalitions rather than to individual candidates, and it was common practice for the mandates to be assigned out of numerical order. Mihajlović could have been included in her party's delegation despite her low position on the list, though ultimately she was not.)

She later appeared in the twenty-fifth position on the Radical Party's list for the Belgrade city assembly in the 2004 Serbian local elections. The list won twenty-seven seats, and on this occasion she was assigned a mandate. The Democratic Party (DS) and its allies won the election, and Mihajlović served in opposition for the next four years.

She was given the twenty-eighth position on the Radical Party's list in the 2008 parliamentary election and the fifth position on its list for Belgrade in the concurrent 2008 local elections. She did not receive a mandate to serve at either level.

The Radical Party experienced a serious split later in 2008, with several prominent members joining the breakaway Serbian Progressive Party (SNS) under the leadership of Nikolić and Aleksandar Vučić. Mihajlović remained with the Radicals.

=== Since 2012 ===
Serbia's electoral system was reformed in 2011, such that all parliamentary mandates were awarded to candidates on successful lists in numerical order. Mihajlović received the ninth position on the Radical Party's list in the 2012 parliamentary election and was promoted to the third position in 2014. The party did not cross the electoral threshold for assembly representation on either occasion.

She was again given the third position on the SRS list for the 2016 parliamentary election and was this time elected when the party won twenty-two seats. The SNS and its allies won a majority victory, and the SRS served in opposition. During her parliamentary term, Mihajlović was a member of the committee on the Serbian diaspora and Serbs in the region, a deputy member of the committee on human and minority rights and gender equality, and a member of the parliamentary friendship groups with Armenia, Belarus, China, and Venezuela.

She again appeared in the third position on the Radical Party's list in the 2020 parliamentary election and was promoted to the second position for the 2022 and 2023 elections. On each occasion, the party failed to cross the electoral threshold.

In May 2022, Vojislav Šešelj received a summons to appear before the International Residual Mechanism for Criminal Tribunals (IRMCT; the successor body to the ICTY) to respond to charges concerning the publication of classified information and the names of protected witnesses. The summons also included the names of seven current and former Radical Party officials, including both Mihajlović and her husband. The IRMCT ultimately filed an indictment against Šešelj, Ljiljana Mihajlović, Ognjen Mihajlović, and two other Radical Party officials on 11 August 2023. In late February 2024, the presiding justice transferred the case to Serbia for trial. The matter is ongoing.

== Electoral record ==
=== Local (Municipality of Zemun) ===
2000 Zemun municipal election: Division 4
Candidate	Party
Ljiljana Mihajlović (DEFEATED)	Serbian Radical Party
other candidates	
Total
