= Siniša Stamenković (Serbian politician, born 1949) =

Serbian politician

Siniša Stamenković (Serbian Cyrillic: Синиша Стаменковић; born 30 April 1949) is a politician in Serbia. He served in the National Assembly of Serbia from 2008 to 2012 and is now a member of the Kladovo municipal assembly. Stamenković is a member of the Party of United Pensioners of Serbia (Partija ujedinjenih penzionera Srbije, PUPS).

== Private career ==
Stamenković is a graduated agricultural engineer. He has worked as the general director of the "Đerdap" fishery in Kladovo and is a specialist in caviar production.

In a 2010 interview, Stamenković indicated that he has a strong interest in astrology.

== Politician ==
=== Parliamentarian ===
The PUPS contested the 2007 Serbian parliamentary election in an alliance with the Social Democratic Party (Socijaldemokratska partija, SDP), and Stamenković appeared in the 191st position on their combined electoral list. The list did not cross the electoral threshold to win representation in the assembly.

For the 2008 Serbian parliamentary election, the PUPS formed a new alliance with the Socialist Party of Serbia (Socijalistička partija Srbije, SPS) Stamenković received the 211th position on the Socialist-led list and was awarded a mandate after the list won twenty seats.. (From 2000 to 2011, all mandates in Serbian parliamentary elections were distributed to candidates on successful lists at the discretion of the sponsoring parties or coalitions, irrespective of numerical order. Stamenković's specific list position had no bearing on his chances of election.) The overall results of the election were initially inconclusive, but the SPS eventually joined a coalition government led by the For a European Serbia (Za evropsku Srbiju, ZES) coalition, and Stamenković served as a supporter of the administration.

Stamenković served as deputy chair of the assembly's agriculture committee during his term in parliament. He was also a member of the committee for relations with Serbs outside Serbia, a member of the committee on Kosovo and Metohija, a deputy member of the health and family committee, a deputy member of the committee on interethnic relations, a deputy member of the committee on science and technological development, and a deputy member of the poverty reduction committee. He led Serbia's parliamentary friendship group with Romania (which borders on Kladovo), and was a member of the friendship groups with Israel, Tunisia, and Turkey.

Serbia's electoral laws were reformed in 2011, such that mandates were awarded in numerical order to candidates on successful lists. Stamenković was given the fifty-eighth position on the Socialist-led list in the 2012 parliamentary election and was not re-elected when the list won forty-four mandates. He later received the ninety-sixth position on the SPS list in the 2014 parliamentary election and was not returned when the list again won forty-four seats.

After the 2014 election, the PUPS switched its affiliation from the Socialist Party to the Serbian Progressive Party (Srpska napredna stranka, SNS). Stamenković has not sought re-election to the national assembly since this time.

=== Local politics ===
Stamenković has served several terms in the Kladovo municipal assembly. In the 2016 Serbian local elections, he appeared in the sixteenth position on the SNS-led list for Kladovo and was elected when the list won a majority victory with seventeen out of twenty-eight mandates.

Kladovo held early local elections in 2018, and the PUPS contested the election on its own list. Stamkenović appeared in the lead position and was re-elected when the list won a single mandate.
