= Siniša Stamenković (Serbian politician, born 1945) =

Serbian politician

Siniša Stamenković (Serbian Cyrillic: Синиша Стаменковић; born 1945) is a lawyer, painter and politician in Serbia. He served in the National Assembly of Serbia from 1993 to 1997 and was the mayor of Gadžin Han for several years, serving as a member of the Socialist Party of Serbia (Socijalistička partija Srbije, SPS).

== Painter ==
Stamenković began painting on a regular basis in 1975, and his works have been featured in several exhibitions in Serbia and internationally. In 1994, he held an exhibition in Gadžin Han with Milić from Mačva, whom he has described as his teacher. He opened an exhibition entitled "Niš–Biblical City" in 2018, consisting of fifteen large format images. The latter work was compared to both Milić from Mačva and Salvador Dalí.

== Politician ==
=== Parliamentarian ===
Stamenković received the thirteenth position on the Socialist Party's electoral list for the Niš division in the 1992 Serbian parliamentary election. The list won eleven mandates, and he was subsequently included in the party's assembly delegation. (From 1992 to 2000, Serbia's electoral law stipulated that one-third of parliamentary mandates would be assigned to candidates from successful lists in numerical order, while the remaining two-thirds would be distributed amongst other candidates on the lists by the sponsoring parties. It was common practice for the latter mandates to be awarded out of numerical order. Stamenković's relatively low position on the list did not prevent him from receiving a mandate.) The Socialists won a minority government and governed in a sort of informal coalition with the Serbian Radical Party (Srpska radikalna stranka, SRS). Stamenković served as a supporter of the administration.

The Radicals subsequently withdrew their support from the government, and a new Serbian parliamentary election was called for late 1993. Stamenković was this time given the seventeenth position on the SPS's list for Niš and was again included in his party's delegation when the list won twelve seats. The Socialists emerged from this election in a stronger position and formed a new coalition government with New Democracy (Nova demokratija, ND); once again, Stamenković was a supporter of the administration in the assembly. He was not a candidate for re-election in the 1997 parliamentary election.

Stamenković was known for his criticisms, often very harsh, of the SPS leadership and of what he described as the "Belgradization of Serbia."

=== Local politics ===
Stamenković served several terms as the mayor of Gadžin Han. A news article from 2001 indicated that he had been in power for the previous decade, winning several elections. He was re-elected in the 2000 Serbian local elections, which took place concurrently with the fall of Slobodan Milošević's administration and the rise of the Democratic Opposition of Serbia (Demokratska opozicija Srbije, DOS). Unlike some Socialist mayors, Stamenković had a good working relationship with the DOS in the following term. He did not seek re-election in the 2004 local elections. Stamenković opened Gadžin Han's House of Culture during his time as mayor and organized a number of cultural events in the community, including the Miljković poetry readings. The municipality developed a strong reputation for its cultural activities during his tenure.

He returned to political life in the 2012 Serbian local elections as the mayoral candidate of the Southeast Serbia Movement. During the election, he argued that the south of Serbia had been cheated out of due revenues from the privatization of state services and that the Niš area was suffering from not having a representative at the centre of Serbia's government. The movement's list won three out of thirty-three seats in the Gadžin Han assembly, and the Socialists remained in power. Stamenković did not seek re-election in the 2016 local elections.
