= 2000 Serbian local elections =

Local elections were held in Serbia (excluding Kosovo) on 24 September 2000, concurrently with the first round of voting in the 2000 Yugoslavian general election and the 2000 Vojvodina provincial election. This was the fourth and final local electoral cycle to take place while Serbia was a member of the Federal Republic of Yugoslavia.

The 2000 Yugoslavian general election was a watershed event in Serbian politics, leading to the 5 October Revolution and resulting in the downfall of Slobodan Milošević's administration. The local elections, while less important in their own right, were part of the same general transformative moment.

To date, this was the last local electoral cycle in Serbia in which assembly delegates were elected in single-member constituencies; all subsequent cycles have been held under proportional representation. In a change from the previous cycle, delegates were elected by first-past-the-post voting rather than in run-off elections. The method of election undoubtedly contributed to the lopsided results in some opposition strongholds, including the capital Belgrade.

The Democratic Opposition of Serbia (Demokratska opozicija Srbije, DOS), a broad and ideologically diverse coalition of parties opposed to the Milošević administration, won significant majority victories in Belgrade, Novi Sad, Niš, and other major cities. Candidates from the Democratic Party (Demokratska stranka, DS), one of the main parties in the coalition, claimed the mayoralties in several jurisdictions won by the DOS (although not in the City of Belgrade, where a series of representatives from other DOS parties held the mayor's office).

== Results ==
=== Belgrade ===
Elections were held at the city level and in all of Belgrade's constituent municipalities. The Democratic Opposition of Serbia (DOS) won a majority in the election for the City Assembly of Belgrade and equally strong victories in many of the city's constituent municipalities. The alliance won every seat in three municipal assemblies and all but one seat in three others.

The only Belgrade municipality that the DOS did not win was Sopot, where the Socialist Party of Serbia–Yugoslav Left alliance won a majority government under the incumbent mayor.

Other than Sopot, the only municipality in Belgrade where the DOS did not win the popular vote was Lazarevac. It may be noted that the Socialist Party–Yugoslav Left alliance ran a full slate of candidates in this municipality, while the DOS refrained from fielding candidates in three divisions (presumably due to pre-election arrangements with other opposition candidates).

==== City of Belgrade ====
Results of the election for the City Assembly of Belgrade:

Party	Votes	%	Seats
Democratic Opposition of Serbia Dr. Vojislav Koštunica	482,985	52.78	105
Socialist Party of Serbia-Yugoslav Left Slobodan Milošević	266,318	29.10	4
Serbian Radical Party	86,402	9.44	1
Serbian Renewal Movement	51,541	5.63	–
Citizens' Group candidates	8,358	0.91	–
Serbia Together	4,961	0.54	–
Radical Party of Serbia	3,877	0.42	–
Serbian Party	2,121	0.23	–
Natural Law Party	1,896	0.21	–
New Communist Party of Yugoslavia	1,731	0.19	–
United Pensioners Party	1,286	0.14	–
Workers' Party of Yugoslavia	869	0.09	–
Green Party	530	0.06	–
Republican Party	508	0.06	–
Yugoslav Communists	473	0.05	–
League of Communists of Yugoslavia	361	0.04	–
Serbian People's Radical Party	337	0.04	–
Party of Serbian Unity	301	0.03	–
People's Computer Party of Serbia	206	0.02	–
Total	915,061	100.00	110
Valid votes	915,061	96.72	
Invalid/blank votes	31,066	3.28	
Total votes	946,127	100.00	
Registered voters/turnout	1,351,812	69.99	

Milan St. Protić of New Serbia (one of the parties in the Democratic Opposition of Serbia coalition) was chosen as mayor after the election. Dragan Jočić of the Democratic Party of Serbia was chosen as deputy mayor, and Nenad Bogdanović of the Democratic Party became president of the executive committee.

St. Protić resigned as mayor on 20 March 2001 and was initially replaced on an interim basis by Dragan Jočić. On 1 June 2001, Radmila Hrustanović of the Civil Alliance of Serbia was chosen as the city's new mayor.

On 4 July 2004, Jočić was succeeded as deputy mayor by Rebeka Božović of the Liberals of Serbia.

==== Municipalities of Belgrade ====
===== Barajevo =====
Results of the election for the Municipal Assembly of Barajevo:

Party	Votes	%	Seats
Democratic Opposition of Serbia Dr. Vojislav Koštunica	5,410	40.14	18
Socialist Party of Serbia-Yugoslav Left Slobodan Milošević	5,250	38.95	13
Serbian Renewal Movement	1,291	9.58	1
Serbian Radical Party	988	7.33	–
Citizens' Group candidates	522	3.87	1
New Communist Party of Yugoslavia	18	0.13	–
Total	13,479	100.00	33
Valid votes	13,479	95.42	
Invalid/blank votes	647	4.58	
Total votes	14,126	100.00	
Registered voters/turnout	18,650	75.74	

Zoran Jevtić of the Democratic Opposition of Serbia was chosen as mayor after the election. He resigned on 9 February 2001 and was replaced on an interim basis by Miodrag Skoknić. After an extended period in which the municipal assembly was not convened, Dragoljub Stanić was named as the head of a provisional administration in November 2001. A new municipal election was held in 2002.

===== Čukarica =====
Results of the election for the Municipal Assembly of Čukarica:

Party	Votes	%	Seats
Democratic Opposition of Serbia Dr. Vojislav Koštunica	50,581	53.71	52
Socialist Party of Serbia-Yugoslav Left Slobodan Milošević	24,811	26.34	1
Serbian Radical Party	9,864	10.47	–
Serbian Renewal Movement	5,184	5.50	–
Serbia Together	2,866	3.04	–
Citizens' Group candidates	511	0.54	–
Natural Law Party	318	0.34	–
Radical Party of Serbia	48	0.05	–
Total	94,183	100.00	53
Valid votes	94,183	96.95	
Invalid/blank votes	2,965	3.05	
Total votes	97,148	100.00	
Registered voters/turnout	138,723	70.03	

Incumbent mayor Zoran Alimpić of the Democratic Party was confirmed for another term in office after the election.

===== Grocka =====
Results of the election for the Municipal Assembly of Grocka:

Party	Votes	%	Seats
Democratic Opposition of Serbia Dr. Vojislav Koštunica	13,323	38.55	20
Socialist Party of Serbia-Yugoslav Left Slobodan Milošević	12,119	35.06	13
Serbian Renewal Movement	4,718	13.65	1
Serbian Radical Party	3,214	9.30	1
Serb Party	589	1.70	–
Citizens' Group candidates	284	0.82	–
Serbia Together	193	0.56	–
Yugoslav Communists	122	0.35	–
Total	34,562	100.00	35
Valid votes	34,562	95.91	
Invalid/blank votes	1,472	4.09	
Total votes	36,034	100.00	
Registered voters/turnout	54,006	66.72	

Vesna Ivić of the Democratic Party was chosen as mayor after the election. He was replaced by Milan Tanasković of the Democratic Party of Serbia on 28 June 2002; Tanasković was in turn replaced by Sava Starčević of the Serbian Renewal Movement on 8 December 2002. After a further period of political upheaval, Vladan Zarić of the Democratic Party became mayor on 15 April 2003.

===== Lazarevac =====
Results of the election for the Municipal Assembly of Lazarevac:

Party	Votes	%	Seats
Democratic Opposition of Serbia Dr. Vojislav Koštunica	14,540	39.37	31
Socialist Party of Serbia-Yugoslav Left Slobodan Milošević	14,557	39.42	26
Serbian Renewal Movement	4,048	10.96	2
Citizens' Group candidates	1,984	5.37	2
Serbian Radical Party	1,356	3.67	–
Yugoslav Communists	134	0.36	–
Natural Law Party	133	0.36	–
People's Radical Party	113	0.31	–
New Communist Party of Yugoslavia	65	0.18	–
Total	36,930	100.00	61
Valid votes	36,930	95.93	
Invalid/blank votes	1,566	4.07	
Total votes	38,496	100.00	
Registered voters/turnout	46,357	83.04	

Ljiljana Zdravković of the Democratic Party became mayor of the municipality in 2001.

===== Mladenovac =====
Results of the election for the Municipal Assembly of Mladenovac:

Party	Votes	%	Seats
Democratic Opposition of Serbia Dr. Vojislav Koštunica	12,871	41.03	36
Socialist Party of Serbia-Yugoslav Left Slobodan Milošević	10,988	35.03	18
Serbian Renewal Movement	3,871	12.34	1
Serbian Radical Party	2,126	6.78	–
Citizens' Group candidates	1,298	4.14	–
League of Communists of Yugoslavia	181	0.58	–
Natural Law Party	34	0.11	–
Total	31,369	100.00	55
Valid votes	31,369	94.45	
Invalid/blank votes	1,845	5.55	
Total votes	33,214	100.00	
Registered voters/turnout	43,316	76.68	

Zoran Kostić of the Democratic Party was chosen as mayor after the election.

===== New Belgrade =====
Results of the election for the Municipal Assembly of New Belgrade:

Party	Votes	%	Seats
Democratic Opposition of Serbia Dr. Vojislav Koštunica	73,499	53.97	65
Socialist Party of Serbia-Yugoslav Left Slobodan Milošević	40,389	29.66	2
Serbian Radical Party	15,905	11.68	–
Serbian Renewal Movement	5,208	3.82	–
Radical Party of Serbia	437	0.32	–
Workers' Party of Yugoslavia	148	0.11	–
Radical Party of the Left – Nikola Pašić	132	0.10	–
Natural Law Party	109	0.08	–
Serbia Together	89	0.07	–
Citizens' group candidates	80	0.06	–
Yugoslav Communists	74	0.05	–
New Communist Party of Yugoslavia	62	0.05	–
People's Computer Party of Serbia	44	0.03	–
Total	136,176	100.00	67
Valid votes	136,176	96.85	
Invalid/blank votes	4,427	3.15	
Total votes	140,603	100.00	
Registered voters/turnout	195,439	71.94	

Željko Ožegović of the Democratic Party was chosen as mayor after the election. Future parliamentarian Marko Đurišić, also of the Democratic Party, was elected for the municipality's seventeenth division.

===== Obrenovac =====
Results of the election for the Municipal Assembly of Obrenovac:

Party	Votes	%	Seats
Democratic Opposition of Serbia Dr. Vojislav Koštunica	16,373	40.36	37
Socialist Party of Serbia-Yugoslav Left Slobodan Milošević	14,471	35.67	14
Serbian Renewal Movement	4,869	12.00	1
Serbian Radical Party	3,009	7.42	1
Citizens' Group candidates	1,154	2.84	2
Natural Law Party	473	1.17	–
New Communist Party of Yugoslavia	180	0.44	–
Yugoslav Communists	38	0.09	–
Total	40,567	100.00	55
Valid votes	40,567	96.11	
Invalid/blank votes	1,642	3.89	
Total votes	42,209	100.00	
Registered voters/turnout	56,727	74.41	

Petar Knezević of the Democratic Opposition of Serbia served as mayor after the election.

===== Palilula =====
Results of the election for the Municipal Assembly of Palilula:

Party	Votes	%	Seats
Democratic Opposition of Serbia Dr. Vojislav Koštunica	44,277	49.95	51
Socialist Party of Serbia-Yugoslav Left Slobodan Milošević	25,218	28.45	3
Serbian Radical Party	8,974	10.12	–
Serbian Renewal Movement	6,880	7.76	1
Citizens' Group candidates	2,992	3.38	–
Radical Party of Serbia	99	0.11	–
New Communist Party of Yugoslavia	65	0.07	–
Serbian People's Radical Party	58	0.07	–
League of Communists of Yugoslavia and Serbia	50	0.06	–
Republican Party	36	0.04	–
Total	88,649	100.00	55
Valid votes	88,649	97.00	
Invalid/blank votes	2,746	3.00	
Total votes	91,395	100.00	
Registered voters/turnout	130,638	69.96	

Milan Marković of the Democratic Party was chosen as mayor after the election.

===== Rakovica =====
Results of the election for the Municipal Assembly of Rakovica:

Party	Votes	%	Seats
Democratic Opposition of Serbia Dr. Vojislav Koštunica	29,605	50.97	49
Socialist Party of Serbia-Yugoslav Left Slobodan Milošević	17,514	30.15	1
Serbian Radical Party	6,591	11.35	–
Serbian Renewal Movement	4,049	6.97	–
Radical Party of Serbia	240	0.41	–
Citizens' Group candidates	57	0.10	–
Serbia Together	30	0.05	–
Total	58,086	100.00	50
Valid votes	58,086	96.37	
Invalid/blank votes	2,185	3.63	
Total votes	60,271	100.00	
Registered voters/turnout	87,329	69.02	

Srboslav Zečević of the Democratic Opposition of Serbia was chosen as mayor after the election.

===== Savski Venac =====
Results of the election for the Municipal Assembly of Savski Venac:

Party	Votes	%	Seats
Democratic Opposition of Serbia Dr. Vojislav Koštunica	17,246	59.08	36
Socialist Party of Serbia-Yugoslav Left Slobodan Milošević	8,455	28.96	1
Serbian Radical Party	2,125	7.28	–
Serbian Renewal Movement	1,232	4.22	–
Citizens' Group candidates	111	0.38	–
New Communist Party of Yugoslavia	24	0.08	–
Total	29,193	100.00	37
Valid votes	29,193	97.72	
Invalid/blank votes	681	2.28	
Total votes	29,874	100.00	
Registered voters/turnout	41,720	71.61	

Branislav Belić of the Democratic Party was chosen as mayor after the election.

===== Sopot =====
Results of the election for the Municipal Assembly of Sopot:

Party	Votes	%	Seats
Socialist Party of Serbia-Yugoslav Left Slobodan Milošević	4,796	41.53	20
Democratic Opposition of Serbia Dr. Vojislav Koštunica	3,032	26.26	8
Serbian Renewal Movement	2,017	17.47	5
Serbian Radical Party	1,249	10.82	–
Citizens' Group candidates	454	3.93	–
Total	11,548	100.00	33
Valid votes	11,548	94.94	
Invalid/blank votes	616	5.06	
Total votes	12,164	100.00	
Registered voters/turnout	16,256	74.83	

Incumbent mayor Živorad Milosavljević of the Socialist Party was confirmed for another term in office after the election.

===== Stari Grad =====
Results of the election for the Municipal Assembly of Stari Grad:

Party	Votes	%	Seats
Democratic Opposition of Serbia Dr. Vojislav Koštunica	25,692	63.65	56
Socialist Party of Serbia-Yugoslav Left Slobodan Milošević	9,722	24.08	–
Serbian Radical Party	2,472	6.12	–
Serbian Renewal Movement	2,164	5.36	–
Citizens' Group candidates	233	0.58	–
Serbia Together	42	0.10	–
Serb Party	42	0.10	–
Total	40,367	100.00	56
Valid votes	40,367	97.70	
Invalid/blank votes	949	2.30	
Total votes	41,316	100.00	
Registered voters/turnout	59,072	69.94	

Mirjana Božidarević of the Democratic Party was chosen as mayor after the election. Nemanja Šarović ran unsuccessfully as the Radical Party's candidate in the municipality's tenth division.

===== Voždovac =====
Results of the election for the Municipal Assembly of Voždovac:

Party	Votes	%	Seats
Democratic Opposition of Serbia Dr. Vojislav Koštunica	45,329	53.88	52
Socialist Party of Serbia-Yugoslav Left Slobodan Milošević	23,310	27.71	3
Serbian Radical Party	7,968	9.47	–
Serbian Renewal Movement	6,655	7.91	–
Citizens' Group candidates	572	0.68	1
Serbia Together	137	0.16	–
New Communist Party of Yugoslavia	101	0.12	–
Republican Party	50	0.06	–
Total	84,122	100.00	56
Valid votes	84,122	97.53	
Invalid/blank votes	2,127	2.47	
Total votes	86,249	100.00	
Registered voters/turnout	133,910	64.41	

Stevan Radović of the Democratic Party was chosen as mayor after the election.

===== Vračar =====
Results of the election for the Municipal Assembly of Vračar:

Party	Votes	%	Seats
Democratic Opposition of Serbia Dr. Vojislav Koštunica	26,983	65.07	60
Socialist Party of Serbia-Yugoslav Left Slobodan Milošević	9,968	24.04	–
Serbian Radical Party	2,375	5.73	–
Serbian Renewal Movement	1,857	4.48	–
Citizens' Group candidates	258	0.62	–
Green Party (Zelena stranka)	24	0.06	–
Total	41,465	100.00	60
Valid votes	41,465	97.69	
Invalid/blank votes	981	2.31	
Total votes	42,446	100.00	
Registered voters/turnout	61,151	69.41	

Incumbent mayor Milena Milošević of the Democratic Party was confirmed for another term in office after the election.

===== Zemun =====
Results of the election for the Municipal Assembly of Zemun:

Party	Votes	%	Seats
Democratic Opposition of Serbia Dr. Vojislav Koštunica	46,719	45.37	61
Socialist Party of Serbia-Yugoslav Left Slobodan Milošević	27,691	26.89	5
Serbian Radical Party	21,469	20.85	4
Serbian Renewal Movement	5,883	5.71	–
Citizens' Group candidates	1,087	1.06	–
Natural Law Party	66	0.06	–
Workers' Party of Yugoslavia	51	0.05	–
Total	102,966	100.00	70
Valid votes	102,966	95.94	
Invalid/blank votes	4,358	4.06	
Total votes	107,324	100.00	
Registered voters/turnout	153,099	70.10	

Vladan Janićijević of the Democratic Party became mayor after the election. Andreja Mladenović of the Democratic Party of Serbia was elected to the assembly and served as a deputy president with responsibility for sports and youth, refugees and social issues, and relations with religious communities. Future parliamentarian Ljiljana Mihajlović ran unsuccessfully for the Radical Party in the fourth division.

===== Zvezdara =====
Results of the election for the Municipal Assembly of Zvezdara:

Party	Votes	%	Seats
Democratic Opposition of Serbia Dr. Vojislav Koštunica	44,004	55.73	53
Socialist Party of Serbia-Yugoslav Left Slobodan Milošević	21,875	27.70	–
Serbian Radical Party	6,766	8.57	–
Serbian Renewal Movement	4,974	6.30	–
Citizens' Group candidates	1,052	1.33	–
Green Party (Zelena stranka)	93	0.12	–
Serb Party	74	0.09	–
Republican Party	48	0.06	–
Radical Party of the Left – Nikola Pašić	45	0.06	–
Radical Party of Serbia	32	0.04	–
Total	78,963	100.00	53
Valid votes	78,963	97.49	
Invalid/blank votes	2,030	2.51	
Total votes	80,993	100.00	
Registered voters/turnout	115,498	70.13	

Peter Moravac of the Democratic Party served as mayor after the election.

Aleksandra Tomić of the Democratic Party of Serbia was elected as the DOS's candidate in the sixteenth division ("Zvezdara II"). She was chosen as president of the executive board on 17 October 2000 and remained in this role until 13 June 2001, when she was re-assigned as an at-large executive board member.

=== Vojvodina ===
==== North Bačka District ====
Elections were held in all three municipalities of the North Bačka District. The Democratic Opposition of Serbia alliance won a landslide victory in Subotica, and the Alliance of Vojvodina Hungarians afterward held the most important offices in the city, with members of the Democratic Party and the Democratic Alliance of Croats in Vojvodina also holding key positions.

The Alliance of Vojvodina Hungarians fielded its own slate of candidates in Bačka Topola (in partnership with the Democratic Fellowship of Vojvodina Hungarians) and Mali Iđoš (on its own) and won majority victories in both jurisdictions.

===== Subotica =====
Results of the election for the Municipal Assembly of Subotica:

Party	Votes	%	Seats
Democratic Opposition of Serbia Dr. Vojislav Koštunica	41,346	47.89	59
Socialist Party of Serbia–Yugoslav Left Slobodan Milošević	12,272	14.21	6
Citizens' Group candidates	9,484	10.98	1
Serbian Radical Party	8,257	9.56	1
Alliance of Citizens of Subotica–Reformists of Vojvodina–Vojvodina Opposition	6,092	7.06	–
Democratic Party of Vojvodina Hungarians	4,963	5.75	–
ECOLOGICAL PARTY OF VOJVODINA	1,200	1.39	–
Party of Yugoslavs	1,092	1.26	–
Serbian Renewal Movement	718	0.83	–
League of Communists of Yugoslavia	596	0.69	–
Bunjevac-Šokac Party	318	0.37	–
Total	86,338	100.00	67

When the assembly convened on 17 October 2000, incumbent mayor József Kasza and incumbent executive board president Imre Kern, both of the Alliance of Vojvodina Hungarians (VMSZ), were confirmed for new terms in their respective offices. Bela Tonković of the Democratic Alliance of Croats in Vojvodina (DSHV) and Nebojša Janjić of the Democratic Party (DS) were chosen as deputy mayors. (The VMSZ and the DS were both constituent members of the Democratic Opposition of Serbia at the republic level; the DSHV was not, although it worked in conjunction with the alliance in Subotica.)

There were several changes in the city's political leadership between 2000 and 2004. József Kasza stood down as mayor on 8 February 2001 after being appointed as a deputy prime minister of Serbia and was replaced by fellow VMSZ member István Ispánovics. Relations between the VMSZ and the DS subsequently worsened, and Janjić was removed as a deputy mayor in defiance of the existing coalition agreement.

Imre Kern stood down as president of the executive board on 16 May 2002 after being appointed to a position in the Vojvodina provincial government (although he remained a member of the city assembly). The following day, Géza Kucsera of the VMSZ was chosen as his replacement and Saša Vučinić of the DS was chosen as a deputy mayor.

István Ispánovics resigned as mayor on 29 May 2003, citing health issues, and was replaced by Kucsera. Rumours circulated that the transition actually took place due to divisions in the VMSZ. Árpád Papp, also of the VMSZ, succeeded Kucsera as president of the executive board.

Bela Tonković was expelled from the DSHV in October 2003 and was removed as a deputy mayor on 10 November 2003.

===== Bačka Topola =====
Results of the election for the Municipal Assembly of Bačka Topola:

Party	Votes	%	Seats
Alliance of Vojvodina Hungarians–Democratic Fellowship of Vojvodina Hungarians	8,979	41.65	28
Socialist Party of Serbia–Yugoslav Left Slobodan Milošević	4,472	20.75	13
Citizens' Group candidates	4,278	19.85	9
Serbian Radical Party	1,457	6.76	–
Democratic Party of Vojvodina Hungarians	1,367	6.34	–
Democratic Opposition of Serbia Dr. Vojislav Koštunica	569	2.64	–
Serbian Renewal Movement	435	2.02	–
Total	21,557	100.00	50

Attila Bábi was chosen as mayor on 24 October 2000. Lászlo Fehér and Ágoston Deli were chosen as deputy mayors, and Aleksandar Dudás, who was not a candidate in the election, became president of the executive board. Bábi and Fehér were members of the Alliance of Vojvodina Hungarians, Deli was a member of the Democratic Fellowship of Vojvodina Hungarians, and Dudás had previously served as a legal representative of the coalition between the parties.

===== Mali Iđoš =====
Results of the election for the Municipal Assembly of Mali Iđoš:

Party	Votes	%	Seats
Alliance of Vojvodina Hungarians	3,246	42.65	16
Socialist Party of Serbia–Yugoslav Left Slobodan Milošević	1,966	25.83	9
Democratic Opposition of Serbia Dr. Vojislav Koštunica	917	12.05	–
Citizens' Group candidates	656	8.62	–
Serbian Radical Party	373	4.90	–
Democratic Fellowship of Vojvodina Hungarians	318	4.18	–
Serbian Renewal Movement	134	1.76	–
Total	7,610	100.00	25

When the assembly convened on 24 October 2000, Béla Sipos was chosen as mayor and Károly Pál as president of the executive board. On 7 December 2000, László Horváth was chosen as deputy mayor. All were members of the Alliance of Vojvodina Hungarians.

Béla Sipos died unexpectedly on 23 September 2001. On 27 November 2001, László Horváth was chosen as his replacement and József Rácz, also of the Alliance of Vojvodina Hungarians, was named as deputy mayor.

József Rácz resigned as deputy mayor on 7 June 2002 and was replaced by József Dudás, also of the Alliance of Vojvodina Hungarians. Rácz later died on 5 January 2004.

On 13 February 2004, László Horváth resigned as mayor and József Dudás resigned as deputy mayor. István Szűgyi was chosen as the municipality's new mayor on the same day, and Teréz Virág was chosen as deputy mayor. Both were, of course, members of the Alliance of Vojvodina Hungarians.

==== South Bačka District ====
Elections were held in all twelve municipalities of the South Bačka District. The Democratic Opposition of Serbia was successful in most areas, winning the Novi Sad municipal assembly in a landslide and participating on the winning side in at least seven of the eleven other municipalities (sometimes in alliance with the Serbian Renewal Movement and other opposition candidates).

The Socialist Party of Serbia held its historical strongholds of Bačka Palanka and Beočin and also won a narrow victory in Titel (although it was not able to form a stable government in the last of these communities). The defeat of the Socialists in Vrbas, another of the party's historical strongholds, was considered an upset.

Independent candidates won the largest number of seats in Bački Petrovac, and independent candidate Pavel Zima was subsequently chosen as mayor of the municipality.

===== Novi Sad =====
Results of the election for the Municipal Assembly of Novi Sad:

Party	Votes	%	Seats
Democratic Opposition of Serbia Dr. Vojislav Koštunica	73,660	44.24	59
Socialist Party of Serbia–Yugoslav Left Slobodan Milošević	38,779	23.29	10
Serbian Radical Party	24,359	14.63	–
Citizens' Group candidates	12,922	7.76	1
Serbian Renewal Movement	10,564	6.35	–
Vojvodina Movement	1,970	1.18	–
Radicals of Serbia	1,438	0.86	–
Alliance of Vojvodina Hungarians	941	0.57	–
People's Party	424	0.25	–
United Pensioners Party	372	0.22	–
Democratic Party of Vojvodina Hungarians	358	0.22	–
Serbia Together	274	0.16	–
Political Organization "Free Vojvodina"	176	0.11	–
Social Democratic Party of Vojvodina	99	0.06	–
New Communist Party of Yugoslavia	92	0.06	–
Natural Law Party	61	0.04	–
Total	166,489	100.00	70
Valid votes	166,489	96.17	
Invalid/blank votes	6,635	3.83	
Total votes	173,124	100.00	
Registered voters/turnout	243,244	71.17	

Borislav Novaković of the Democratic Party was chosen as mayor after the election. Former mayor Milorad Mirčić of the Radical Party sought re-election to the assembly and, like all Radical Party candidates in this cycle, was defeated.

===== Bač =====
Results of the election for the Municipal Assembly of Bač:

Party	Votes	%	Seats
Democratic Opposition of Serbia Dr. Vojislav Koštunica	3,722	41.17	15
Socialist Party of Serbia–Yugoslav Left Slobodan Milošević	3,335	36.89	8
Serbian Radical Party	1,080	11.95	–
Citizens' Group candidates	764	8.45	1
Serbian Renewal Movement	139	1.54	1
Total	9,040	100.00	25
Valid votes	9,040	94.99	
Invalid/blank votes	477	5.01	
Total votes	9,517	100.00	
Registered voters/turnout	12,852	74.05	

Tomislav Bogunović of the Democratic Party was chosen as mayor after the election.

===== Bačka Palanka =====
Results of the election for the Municipal Assembly of Bačka Palanka:

Party	Votes	%	Seats
Socialist Party of Serbia–Yugoslav Left Slobodan Milošević	15,088	41.48	25
Democratic Opposition of Serbia Dr. Vojislav Koštunica	11,200	30.79	13
Serbian Radical Party	5,187	14.26	–
Serbian Renewal Movement	3,147	8.65	–
Citizens' Group candidates	1,753	4.82	3
Total	36,375	100.00	41
Valid votes	36,375	95.15	
Invalid/blank votes	1,854	4.85	
Total votes	38,229	100.00	
Registered voters/turnout	46,613	82.01	

Zvezdan Kisić of the Socialist Party served as mayor after the election.

===== Bački Petrovac =====
Results of the election for the Municipal Assembly of Bački Petrovac:

Party	Votes	%	Seats
Democratic Opposition of Serbia Dr. Vojislav Koštunica	2,971	34.82	12
Citizens' Group candidates	2,902	34.01	14
Socialist Party of Serbia–Yugoslav Left Slobodan Milošević	2,020	23.67	–
Serbian Radical Party	640	7.50	–
Total	8,533	100.00	26
Valid votes	8,533	95.74	
Invalid/blank votes	380	4.26	
Total votes	8,913	100.00	
Registered voters/turnout	12,090	73.72	

Independent delegate Pavel Zima served as mayor after the election.

===== Bečej =====
Results of the election for the Municipal Assembly of Bečej:

Party	Votes	%	Seats
Democratic Opposition of Serbia Dr. Vojislav Koštunica	10,837	46.12	31
Socialist Party of Serbia–Yugoslav Left Slobodan Milošević	4,922	20.95	2
Christian Democratic Movement of Vojvodina Hungarians	3,206	13.64	2
Serbian Radical Party	2,739	11.66	1
Citizens' Group candidates	1,332	5.67	–
Democratic Party of Vojvodina Hungarians	460	1.96	–
Total	23,496	100.00	36
Valid votes	23,496	94.33	
Invalid/blank votes	1,412	5.67	
Total votes	24,908	100.00	
Registered voters/turnout	35,003	71.16	

Zoran Stojšin of the Democratic Party became mayor after the election.

===== Beočin =====
Results of the election for the Municipal Assembly of Beočin:

Party	Votes	%	Seats
Socialist Party of Serbia–Yugoslav Left Slobodan Milošević	3,607	39.97	25
Serbian Radical Party	1,786	19.79	2
Democratic Opposition of Serbia Dr. Vojislav Koštunica	1,722	19.08	5
Serbian Renewal Movement–United Opposition	968	10.73	1
Citizens' Group candidates	942	10.44	–
Total	9,025	100.00	33
Valid votes	9,025	94.77	
Invalid/blank votes	498	5.23	
Total votes	9,523	100.00	
Registered voters/turnout	11,388	83.62	

Dimitrije Kovačević of the Socialist Party was chosen as mayor after the election.

===== Srbobran =====
Results of the election for the Municipal Assembly of Srbobran:

Party	Votes	%	Seats
Socialist Party of Serbia–Yugoslav Left Slobodan Milošević	2,925	29.99	9
Serbian Radical Party	1,621	16.62	–
Citizens' Group candidates	1,609	16.50	3
Democratic Opposition of Serbia Dr. Vojislav Koštunica	1,379	14.14	6
Democratic Party of Vojvodina Hungarians	886	9.08	4
Serbian Renewal Movement, Democratic Party, and League of Social Democrats of Vojvodina	613	6.29	1
Serbian Renewal Movement	239	2.45	2
Democratic Fellowship of Vojvodina Hungarians	175	1.79	1
Alliance of Vojvodina Hungarians	163	1.67	1
Democratic Party	143	1.47	1
Total	9,753	100.00	28
Valid votes	9,753	93.86	
Invalid/blank votes	638	6.14	
Total votes	10,391	100.00	
Registered voters/turnout	13,107	79.28	

Branislav Pivnički, who was elected as a candidate of the Democratic Party, was chosen was mayor on 12 October 2000 with the support of the Democratic Opposition of Serbia and aligned representatives. Tamás Dosztán became deputy mayor, and Đorđe Kalember became president of the executive committee.

===== Sremski Karlovci =====
Results of the election for the Municipal Assembly of Sremski Karlovci:

Party	Votes	%	Seats
United Democratic Opposition of Sremski Karlovci	2,171	47.43	18
Socialist Party of Serbia–Yugoslav Left Slobodan Milošević	1,279	27.94	4
Serbian Radical Party	665	14.53	–
Citizens' Group candidates	462	10.09	3
Total	4,577	100.00	25
Valid votes	4,577	96.05	
Invalid/blank votes	188	3.95	
Total votes	4,765	100.00	
Registered voters/turnout	7,070	67.40	

Đorđe Gačić of the Serbian Renewal Movement (one of the parties in the United Democratic Opposition) served as mayor after the election.

===== Temerin =====
Results of the election for the Municipal Assembly of Temerin:

Party	Votes	%	Seats
Socialist Party of Serbia–Yugoslav Left Slobodan Milošević	4,233	26.96	15
Democratic Party of Vojvodina Hungarians	3,166	20.16	10
Serbian Radical Party	2,719	17.32	–
United Democratic Opposition of the Municipality of Temerin (DS, SPO, DSS, DHSS)	2,567	16.35	2
Alliance of Vojvodina Hungarians	1,695	10.79	2
Citizens' Group candidates	899	5.73	1
Christian Democratic Movement of Vojvodina Hungarians	424	2.70	1
Total	15,703	100.00	31
Valid votes	15,703	94.51	
Invalid/blank votes	913	5.49	
Total votes	16,616	100.00	
Registered voters/turnout	20,207	82.23	

Although the Socialist Party–Yugoslav Left alliance won a plurality victory, the sixteen opposition delegates were able to unite to form a new local government. Petar Novak of the Democratic Party of Serbia (one of the parties in the United Democratic Opposition alliance) was chosen as mayor after the election. He was succeeded by Ðuro Žiga of the same party in 2002.

===== Titel =====
Results of the election for the Municipal Assembly of Titel:

Party	Votes	%	Seats
Socialist Party of Serbia-Yugoslav Left Slobodan Milošević	3,111	34.91	14
Democratic Opposition of Serbia Dr. Vojislav Koštunica	2,917	32.73	10
Serbian Radical Party	1,390	15.60	1
Serbian Renewal Movement	792	8.89	–
Citizens' Group candidates	480	5.39	–
Yugoslav Communists in Serbia	221	2.48	–
Total	8,911	100.00	25
Valid votes	8,911	93.67	
Invalid/blank votes	602	6.33	
Total votes	9,513	100.00	
Registered voters/turnout	12,070	78.82	

When the assembly convened on 16 October 2000, a representative from the Socialist Party of Serbia was chosen as mayor, and a candidate co-proposed by the Socialists and the Democratic Opposition of Serbia was chosen as deputy mayor.

The local government formed after this election was not stable, and a new municipal election was held in November 2001. Milivoj Petrović of the Democratic Party was named as leader of the municipal council prior to the 2001 vote and was confirmed as mayor afterward.

===== Vrbas =====
Results of the election for the Municipal Assembly of Vrbas:

Party	Votes	%	Seats
Democratic Opposition of Serbia Dr. Vojislav Koštunica	10,853	41.11	20
Socialist Party of Serbia–Yugoslav Left Slobodan Milošević	10,510	39.81	15
Serbian Radical Party	3,437	13.02	–
Serbian Renewal Movement	1,600	6.06	–
Total	26,400	100.00	35
Valid votes	26,400	93.94	
Invalid/blank votes	1,703	6.06	
Total votes	28,103	100.00	
Registered voters/turnout	36,138	77.77	

Rafail Ruskovski of the Democratic Party served as mayor after the election. Milan Stanimirović, also of the Democratic Party, succeeded him in 2002.

===== Žabalj =====
Results of the election for the Municipal Assembly of Žabalj:

Party	Votes	%	Seats
Democratic Opposition of Serbia Dr. Vojislav Koštunica	5,083	40.99	21
Socialist Party of Serbia–Yugoslav Left Slobodan Milošević	4,502	36.30	10
Serbian Radical Party	2,051	16.54	–
Citizens' Group candidates	648	5.23	–
Vojvodina Autonomist Movement	117	0.94	–
Total	12,401	100.00	31
Valid votes	12,401	92.52	
Invalid/blank votes	1,002	7.48	
Total votes	13,403	100.00	
Registered voters/turnout	19,474	68.83	

The Serbian Renewal Movement (SPO) participated in the Democratic Opposition of Serbia alliance in Žabalj, and Vasa Zlokolica of the SPO was chosen as mayor after the election.

=== Central Serbia (excluding Belgrade) ===
==== Mačva District ====
Local elections were held in all eight municipalities of the Mačva District.

In the administrative centre of Šabac, the Democratic Opposition of Serbia won a majority victory. In Loznica, the second-largest community, the Socialist Party of Serbia's alliance technically won a narrow victory, but the DOS was able to form a coalition government afterward.

The SPS alliance won a minority victory in Bogatić, the third-largest community. In the smaller communities of Koceljeva, Krupanj, Ljubovija, Mali Zvornik, and Vladimirci, the SPS alliance won majority victories.

===== Šabac =====
Results of the election for the Municipal Assembly of Šabac:

Party	Votes	%	Seats
Democratic Opposition of Serbia Dr. Vojislav Koštunica	33,046	45.27	53
Socialist Party of Serbia–Yugoslav Left Slobodan Milošević	26,663	36.53	22
Serbian Renewal Movement	6,300	8.63	1
Serbian Radical Party	4,036	5.53	–
Citizens' Group candidates	2,636	3.61	1
Yugoslav Communists	310	0.42	–
Total	72,991	100.00	77
Valid votes	72,991	95.64	
Invalid/blank votes	3,331	4.36	
Total votes	76,322	100.00	
Registered voters/turnout	99,640	76.60	

Dušan Petrović of the Democratic Party was chosen as mayor after the election.

===== Bogatić =====
Results of the election for the Municipal Assembly of Bogatić:

Party	Votes	%	Seats
Socialist Party of Serbia–Yugoslav Left Slobodan Milošević	9,462	45.85	14
Citizens' Group candidates	6,238	30.22	11
Democratic Opposition of Serbia Dr. Vojislav Koštunica	3,918	18.98	6
Serbian Radical Party	957	4.64	–
People's Peasant Party	64	0.31	–
Total	20,639	100.00	31
Valid votes	20,639	96.94	
Invalid/blank votes	652	3.06	
Total votes	21,291	100.00	
Registered voters/turnout	26,027	81.80	

===== Koceljeva =====
Results of the election for the Municipal Assembly of Koceljeva:

Party	Votes	%	Seats
Socialist Party of Serbia–Yugoslav Left Slobodan Milošević	4,366	45.67	18
Opposition in Koceljeva	3,717	38.88	10
Serbian Radical Party	873	9.13	1
Citizens' Group candidates	604	6.32	2
Total	9,560	100.00	31
Valid votes	9,560	95.25	
Invalid/blank votes	477	4.75	
Total votes	10,037	100.00	
Registered voters/turnout	13,282	75.57	

===== Krupanj =====
Results of the election for the Municipal Assembly of Krupanj:

Party	Votes	%	Seats
Socialist Party of Serbia–Yugoslav Left Slobodan Milošević	6,000	46.53	26
Democratic Opposition of Serbia and Serbian Renewal Movement	5,520	42.80	13
Serbian Radical Party	933	7.23	–
Citizens' Group candidates	443	3.44	–
Total	12,896	100.00	39
Valid votes	12,896	95.17	
Invalid/blank votes	654	4.83	
Total votes	13,550	100.00	
Registered voters/turnout	16,963	79.88	

===== Ljubovija =====
Results of the election for the Municipal Assembly of Ljubovija:

Party	Votes	%	Seats
Socialist Party of Serbia–Yugoslav Left Slobodan Milošević	4,659	43.21	20
Democratic Opposition of Serbia Dr. Vojislav Koštunica	3,993	37.03	14
Serbian Renewal Movement	1,080	10.02	–
Serbian Radical Party	880	8.16	–
Citizens' Group candidates	171	1.59	–
Total	10,783	100.00	34
Valid votes	10,783	96.50	
Invalid/blank votes	391	3.50	
Total votes	11,174	100.00	
Registered voters/turnout	13,638	81.93	

Vidoje Jovanović of the Socialist Party of Serbia was chosen as mayor after the election.

Future parliamentarian Sreto Perić was the Serbian Radical Party's candidate for Ljubovija's twenty-first division.

===== Loznica =====
Results of the election for the Municipal Assembly of Loznica:

Party	Votes	%	Seats
Socialist Party of Serbia–Yugoslav Left Slobodan Milošević	19,414	38.57	31
Democratic Opposition of Serbia Dr. Vojislav Koštunica	18,724	37.20	29
Serbian Radical Party	6,280	12.48	1
Serbian Renewal Movement	3,410	6.77	3
Citizens' Group candidates	2,508	4.98	1
Total	50,336	100.00	65
Valid votes	50,336	96.63	
Invalid/blank votes	1,755	3.37	
Total votes	52,091	100.00	
Registered voters/turnout	74,315	70.09	

The Democratic Opposition of Serbia formed government after the election, and Slobodan Kaitović of the Democratic Party became mayor.

===== Mali Zvornik =====
Results of the election for the Municipal Assembly of Mali Zvornik:

Party	Votes	%	Seats
Socialist Party of Serbia–Yugoslav Left Slobodan Milošević	3,265	42.28	22
Democratic Opposition of Serbia Dr. Vojislav Koštunica	2,532	32.79	6
Serbian Radical Party	1,190	15.41	–
Citizens' Group candidates	668	8.65	1
Serb Democratic Party (D. Kojčić)	56	0.73	–
Serbian Renewal Movement	11	0.14	–
Total	7,722	100.00	29
Valid votes	7,722	95.97	
Invalid/blank votes	324	4.03	
Total votes	8,046	100.00	
Registered voters/turnout	11,405	70.55	

===== Vladimirci =====
Results of the election for the Municipal Assembly of Vladimirci:

Party	Votes	%	Seats
Socialist Party of Serbia–Yugoslav Left Slobodan Milošević	5,113	42.02	25
Democratic Opposition of Serbia Dr. Vojislav Koštunica	3,417	28.08	10
Serbian Renewal Movement	2,192	18.01	5
Citizens' Group candidates	766	6.30	3
Serbian Radical Party	680	5.59	–
Total	12,168	100.00	43
Valid votes	12,168	95.14	
Invalid/blank votes	622	4.86	
Total votes	12,790	100.00	
Registered voters/turnout	17,545	72.90	

==== Nišava District ====
Local elections were held in the City of Niš, both of Niš's constituent municipalities, and the six other municipalities of the Nišava District.

The results showed a pronounced divide between the city, where the DOS won an overwhelming victory, and its periphery, where the SPS–JUL alliance won majority victories in every jurisdiction except one. (The exception was Svrljig, where the result was a tie and a member of the DOS ultimately won the mayor's office.)

The SPS subsequently lost its majority in Ražanj, and a temporary administration was appointed prior to a new election in 2002.

===== City of Niš =====
Results of the election for the City Assembly of Niš:

Party	Votes	%	Seats
Democratic Opposition of Serbia Dr. Vojislav Koštunica	81,984	49.94	85
Socialist Party of Serbia–Yugoslav Left Slobodan Milošević	40,970	24.96	6
Serbian Renewal Movement	26,082	15.89	4
Serbian Radical Party	10,466	6.38	–
Citizens' Group candidates	4,357	2.65	–
Independent Radical Party	290	0.18	–
Total	164,149	100.00	95
Valid votes	164,149	96.81	
Invalid/blank votes	5,406	3.19	
Total votes	169,555	100.00	
Registered voters/turnout	213,236	79.52	

Incumbent mayor Zoran Živković of the Democratic Party was re-elected in Niš's fifty-eighth division and was initially confirmed for another term as mayor when the city assembly convened in October 2000. Živković resigned the following month after being appointed to a ministerial position in the Federal Republic of Yugoslavia; his successor was Goran Ćirić, also a member of the Democratic Party, who had been elected in the forty-eighth division.

====== Municipality of Niš ======
Results of the election for the Municipal Assembly of Niš:

Party	Votes	%	Seats
Democratic Opposition of Serbia Dr. Vojislav Koštunica	80,217	51.95	82
Socialist Party of Serbia–Yugoslav Left Slobodan Milošević	37,517	24.30	6
Serbian Renewal Movement	22,862	14.81	2
Serbian Radical Party	10,220	6.62	–
Citizens' Group candidates	3,537	2.29	–
Independent Radical Party	55	0.04	–
Total	154,408	100.00	90
Valid votes	154,408	96.74	
Invalid/blank votes	5,207	3.26	
Total votes	159,615	100.00	
Registered voters/turnout	200,954	79.43	

Vladimir Domazet of the Democratic Party was chosen as mayor of the municipality after the election.

====== Niška Banja ======
Results of the election for the Municipal Assembly of Niška Banja:

Party	Votes	%	Seats
Democratic Opposition of Serbia Dr. Vojislav Koštunica	3,940	41.53	18
Socialist Party of Serbia–Yugoslav Left Slobodan Milošević	2,588	27.28	5
Serbian Renewal Movement	2,186	23.04	2
Serbian Radical Party	629	6.63	–
Citizens' Group candidates	143	1.51	–
Total	9,486	100.00	25
Valid votes	9,486	95.39	
Invalid/blank votes	458	4.61	
Total votes	9,944	100.00	
Registered voters/turnout	12,282	80.96	

Branislav Cvetković of the Democratic Party was chosen as mayor after the election. He was later succeeded by Života Stojanović.

===== Aleksinac =====
Results of the election for the Municipal Assembly of Aleksinac:

Party	Votes	%	Seats
Socialist Party of Serbia-Yugoslav Left Slobodan Milošević	13,718	39.30	33
Democratic Opposition of Serbia Dr. Vojislav Koštunica	9,734	27.89	16
Serbian Radical Party	4,357	12.48	1
Serbian Renewal Movement	4,075	11.68	4
Citizens' Group candidates	2,150	6.16	1
Peasant Party of Serbia	452	1.30	–
United Peasant Party	416	1.19	–
Total	34,902	100.00	55
Valid votes	34,902	95.56	
Invalid/blank votes	1,620	4.44	
Total votes	36,522	100.00	
Registered voters/turnout	48,155	75.84	

The local government proved unstable, and a new election was held in November 2001. Radoslav Pavković served as mayor after the latter election.

===== Doljevac =====
Results of the election for the Municipal Assembly of Doljevac:

Party	Votes	%	Seats
Socialist Party of Serbia–Yugoslav Left Slobodan Milošević	5,468	41.79	24
Serbian Renewal Movement	2,501	19.11	4
Citizens' Group candidates	2,106	16.10	4
Democratic Opposition of Serbia Dr. Vojislav Koštunica	1,542	11.79	3
Serbian Radical Party	1,467	11.21	2
Total	13,084	100.00	37
Valid votes	13,084	93.64	
Invalid/blank votes	888	6.36	
Total votes	13,972	100.00	
Registered voters/turnout	15,610	89.51	

Predrag Stanojević of the Socialist Party served as mayor after the election.

===== Gadžin Han =====
Results of the election for the Municipal Assembly of Gadžin Han:

Party	Votes	%	Seats
Socialist Party of Serbia	3,973	52.55	35
Citizens' Group candidates	1,293	17.10	3
Serbian Renewal Movement	939	12.42	1
Serbian Radical Party	824	10.90	1
Yugoslav Left	309	4.09	2
Democratic Opposition of Serbia and Serbian Renewal Movement	157	2.08	–
Democratic Opposition of Serbia Dr. Vojislav Koštunica	65	0.86	1
Total	7,560	100.00	43
Valid votes	7,560	93.51	
Invalid/blank votes	525	6.49	
Total votes	8,085	100.00	
Registered voters/turnout	10,110	79.97	

Incumbent mayor Siniša Stamenković of the Socialist Party was confirmed for another term in office after the election.

===== Merošina =====
Results of the election for the Municipal Assembly of Merošina:

Party	Votes	%	Seats
Socialist Party of Serbia–Yugoslav Left Slobodan Milošević	4,955	50.59	27
Democratic Opposition of Serbia Dr. Vojislav Koštunica	2,424	24.75	7
Citizens' Group candidates	1,299	13.26	5
Serbian Radical Party	861	8.79	–
Serbian Renewal Movement	256	2.61	–
Total	9,795	100.00	39
Valid votes	9,795	96.60	
Invalid/blank votes	345	3.40	
Total votes	10,140	100.00	
Registered voters/turnout	12,329	82.25	

The Socialist Party remained in power after the election. Following a period of local upheaval, Socialist Party member Zoran Ristić was chosen as mayor on 13 January 2002.

===== Ražanj =====
Results of the election for the Municipal Assembly of Ražanj:

Party	Votes	%	Seats
Socialist Party of Serbia–Yugoslav Left Slobodan Milošević	3,033	41.89	21
Democratic Opposition of Serbia Dr. Vojislav Koštunica	1,382	19.09	6
Serbian Radical Party	1,219	16.84	1
Citizens' Group candidates	895	12.36	1
Serbian Renewal Movement	711	9.82	2
Total	7,240	100.00	31
Valid votes	7,240	95.05	
Invalid/blank votes	377	4.95	
Total votes	7,617	100.00	
Registered voters/turnout	9,943	76.61	

The Socialist Party won the election, but it fell from power on 3 December 2001, when sixteen assembly members resigned. The assembly was dissolved, Životije Popović of the Democratic Opposition of Serbia was appointed as president of a provisional council, and new elections were scheduled for 2002.

===== Svrljig =====
Results of the election for the Municipal Assembly of Svrljig:

Party	Votes	%	Seats
Socialist Party of Serbia–Yugoslav Left Slobodan Milošević	4,642	39.51	18
Democratic Opposition of Serbia Dr. Vojislav Koštunica	2,752	23.42	6
United Opposition of Svrljig	2,743	23.34	8
Citizens' Group candidates	852	7.25	4
Serbian Radical Party	761	6.48	–
Total	11,750	100.00	36
Valid votes	11,750	93.61	
Invalid/blank votes	802	6.39	
Total votes	12,552	100.00	
Registered voters/turnout	15,825	79.32	

The election resulted in a tie between the Socialists and the combined forces of the opposition. When the assembly convened Tihomir Vidanović of the Democratic Party was chosen as mayor over SPS candidate Saša Golubović. Vidanović resigned in 2004, and Golubović (who had since left the SPS to join G17 Plus) was chosen as his successor.

==== Šumadija District ====
Elections were held in all seven municipalities of the Šumadija District. The DOS won a somewhat unexpected majority victory in Kragujevac and also won majorities in Aranđelovac, Lapovo, and Topola. A local opposition alliance including the DOS won in Knić, and in Rača the DOS and SPO ran a combined campaign and won a landslide majority.

The SPS–JUL alliance won a narrow majority in Batočina and an incumbent mayor from the Yugoslav Left initially remained in power, but he was removed from office in 2001. The Democratic Party of Serbia won a new election in the municipality later in the same year.

===== Kragujevac =====
Results of the election for the City Assembly of Kragujevac:

Party	Votes	%	Seats
Democratic Opposition of Serbia Dr. Vojislav Koštunica	38,011	34.33	51
Socialist Party of Serbia-Yugoslav Left Slobodan Milošević	37,176	33.57	27
Citizens' Group candidates	28,458	25.70	13
Serbian Radical Party	5,812	5.25	–
Party of Serbian Unity	665	0.60	–
Workers' Movement	301	0.27	–
DEMOS - Movement for Europe	233	0.21	–
United Peasant Party	78	0.07	–
Total	110,734	100.00	91
Valid votes	110,734	97.28	
Invalid/blank votes	3,102	2.72	
Total votes	113,836	100.00	
Registered voters/turnout	142,824	79.70	

Prior to the election, the local membership of the Democratic Party in Kragujevac was divided between those who favoured membership in the DOS and those who wanted to align with the "Together for Kragujevac" citizens' group led by incumbent mayor Veroljub Stevanović of the Serbian Renewal Movement. The DS board was dissolved in the middle of the campaign, and many of its members joined Stevanović's campaign.

The DOS's majority victory in the city was somewhat unexpected. Vlatko Rajković, a Democratic Party member who had aligned himself with the DOS, was chosen as mayor.

Yugoslavian parliamentarian Nataša Jovanović of the Serbian Radical Party was defeated in her bid for election in Kragujevac's fiftieth ward.

===== Aranđelovac =====
Results of the election for the Municipal Assembly of Aranđelovac:

Party	Votes	%	Seats
Democratic Opposition of Serbia Dr. Vojislav Koštunica	14,567	51.97	30
Socialist Party of Serbia-Yugoslav Left Slobodan Milošević	9,188	32.78	9
Serbian Radical Party	1,618	5.77	–
Citizens' Group candidates	1,521	5.43	1
Serbian Renewal Movement	1,136	4.05	1
Total	28,030	100.00	41
Valid votes	28,030	96.21	
Invalid/blank votes	1,104	3.79	
Total votes	29,134	100.00	
Registered voters/turnout	37,483	77.73	

Radmilo Milošević of the Democratic Party of Serbia was chosen as mayor after the election.

===== Batočina =====
Results of the election for the Municipal Assembly of Batočina:

Party	Votes	%	Seats
Socialist Party of Serbia-Yugoslav Left Slobodan Milošević	3,572	41.31	18
Citizens' Group candidates	1,952	22.57	10
Democratic Opposition of Serbia Dr. Vojislav Koštunica	1,580	18.27	3
Serbian Renewal Movement	1,252	14.48	4
Serbian Radical Party	291	3.37	–
Total	8,647	100.00	35
Valid votes	8,647	96.68	
Invalid/blank votes	297	3.32	
Total votes	8,944	100.00	
Registered voters/turnout	10,778	82.98	

Incumbent mayor Slobodan Živulović of the Yugoslav Left was confirmed for a new term in office after the election. An international warrant was later issued for his arrest, and he went on the run. The Serbian government introduced an administration led by Radiša Milošević of the Democratic Party, which remained in power for nine months. A new election was held in November 2001, after which time Miodrag Nikolić of the Democratic Party of Serbia served as mayor.

===== Knić =====
Results of the election for the Municipal Assembly of Knić:

Party	Votes	%	Seats
United Opposition of Knić	5,048	46.10	19
Socialist Party of Serbia-Yugoslav Left Slobodan Milošević	4,926	44.99	13
Serbian Radical Party	585	5.34	–
Citizens' Group candidates	390	3.56	1
Total	10,949	100.00	33
Valid votes	10,949	96.59	
Invalid/blank votes	386	3.41	
Total votes	11,335	100.00	
Registered voters/turnout	13,641	83.10	

Vojin Maksimović of the United Opposition of Knić served as mayor after the election.

===== Lapovo =====
Results of the election for the Municipal Assembly of Lapovo:

Party	Votes	%	Seats
Democratic Opposition of Serbia Dr. Vojislav Koštunica	2,754	48.53	21
Socialist Party of Serbia-Yugoslav Left Slobodan Milošević	2,318	40.85	8
Serbian Radical Party	486	8.56	–
Citizens' Group candidates	117	2.06	–
Total	5,675	100.00	29
Valid votes	5,675	96.55	
Invalid/blank votes	203	3.45	
Total votes	5,878	100.00	
Registered voters/turnout	7,326	80.23	

Miloš Zdravković of the Democratic Opposition of Serbia served as mayor after the election.

===== Rača =====
Results of the election for the Municipal Assembly of Rača:

Party	Votes	%	Seats
Serbian Renewal Movement	3,229	35.13	19
Socialist Party of Serbia-Yugoslav Left Slobodan Milošević	3,101	33.74	3
Democratic Opposition of Serbia Dr. Vojislav Koštunica	1,819	19.79	9
Serbian Radical Party	555	6.04	–
Citizens' Group candidates	487	5.30	–
Total	9,191	100.00	31
Valid votes	9,191	96.58	
Invalid/blank votes	325	3.42	
Total votes	9,516	100.00	
Registered voters/turnout	11,384	83.59	

The Serbian Renewal Movement and Democratic Opposition of Serbia ran a coordinated campaign in Rača, with each group withholding candidates in certain electoral divisions to prevent vote-splitting. Slađan Radovanović of the Serbian Renewal Movement was chosen as mayor after the election.

===== Topola =====
Results of the election for the Municipal Assembly of Topola:

Party	Votes	%	Seats
Democratic Opposition of Serbia Dr. Vojislav Koštunica	8,965	56.79	32
Socialist Party of Serbia-Yugoslav Left Slobodan Milošević	5,787	36.66	6
Serbian Radical Party	522	3.31	–
Citizens' Group candidates	310	1.96	1
Serbian Renewal Movement	203	1.29	1
Total	15,787	100.00	40
Valid votes	15,787	94.91	
Invalid/blank votes	846	5.09	
Total votes	16,633	100.00	
Registered voters/turnout	20,908	79.55	

Miomir Tadić of New Serbia was chosen as mayor after the election.

==== Zlatibor District ====
Elections were held in all ten municipalities of the Zlatibor District. The Democratic Opposition of Serbia formed government in the city of Užice and in six of the district's other municipalities, sometimes working in conjunction with the Serbian Renewal Movement.

The Socialist Party of Serbia's alliance won majority victories in Priboj and Prijepolje. The Serbian government later established a provisional administration in Priboj led by the member of the Democratic Party in 2002, following the resignation of a majority of local assembly members. Separately, the Socialists formed government in Priboj in the same year after the defection of a single representative.

The List for Sandžak, which was led by the Party of Democratic Action of Sandžak (SDA S) won the election in Sjenica.

===== Užice =====
Results of the election for the City Assembly of Užice:

Party	Votes	%	Seats
Democratic Opposition of Serbia Dr. Vojislav Koštunica	26,529	50.50	50
Socialist Party of Serbia-Yugoslav Left Slobodan Milošević	16,564	31.53	10
Serbian Renewal Movement	7,407	14.10	7
Serbian Radical Party	1,745	3.32	–
Citizens' Group candidates	242	0.46	–
Radical Party of the Left "Nikola Pašić"	42	0.08	–
Total	52,529	100.00	67
Valid votes	52,529	96.65	
Invalid/blank votes	1,819	3.35	
Total votes	54,348	100.00	
Registered voters/turnout	68,033	79.88	

When the new assembly convened on 12 October 2000, Miroslav Martić was chosen as the city's mayor, Nada Novaković as deputy mayor, and Slavko Lukić as president of the assembly's executive board. Martić and Novaković were both members of the Democratic Party, while Lukić was a member of the Civic Alliance of Serbia.

Novaković stood down as deputy mayor in early 2002 and was succeeded by Milomir Sredojević of the Democratic Party.

===== Arilje =====
Results of the election for the Municipal Assembly of Arilje:

Party	Votes	%	Seats
Socialist Party of Serbia-Yugoslav Left Slobodan Milošević	5,105	40.40	11
Democratic Opposition of Serbia Dr. Vojislav Koštunica	4,255	33.67	16
Serbian Renewal Movement	2,021	15.99	7
Serbian Radical Party	669	5.29	–
Citizens' Group candidates	586	4.64	–
Total	12,636	100.00	34
Valid votes	12,636	96.30	
Invalid/blank votes	485	3.70	
Total votes	13,121	100.00	
Registered voters/turnout	15,735	83.39	

It may be noted that the Democratic Opposition of Serbia only fielded twenty-two candidates and the Serbian Renewal Movement only fielded eleven.

Incumbent mayor Zoran Mićović of the Democratic Party was confirmed for another term in office after the election.

===== Bajina Bašta =====
Results of the election for the Municipal Assembly of Bajina Bašta:

Party	Votes	%	Seats
Democratic Opposition of Serbia Dr. Vojislav Koštunica	7,116	44.17	17
Socialist Party of Serbia-Yugoslav Left Slobodan Milošević	6,368	39.53	19
Serbian Radical Party	1,139	7.07	1
Citizens' Group candidates	811	5.03	2
Serbian Renewal Movement	676	4.20	2
Total	16,110	100.00	41
Valid votes	16,110	96.73	
Invalid/blank votes	544	3.27	
Total votes	16,654	100.00	
Registered voters/turnout	22,665	73.48	

The Democratic Opposition of Serbia formed government in the municipality. Boban Tomić, a member of the Democratic Party, served as mayor.

===== Čajetina =====
Results of the election for the Municipal Assembly of Čajetina:

Party	Votes	%	Seats
Democratic Opposition of Serbia Dr. Vojislav Koštunica	4,886	49.73	19
Socialist Party of Serbia-Yugoslav Left Slobodan Milošević	4,027	40.98	11
Citizens' Group candidates	429	4.37	1
Serbian Renewal Movement	310	3.15	–
Serbian Radical Party	174	1.77	–
Total	9,826	100.00	31
Valid votes	9,826	97.35	
Invalid/blank votes	267	2.65	
Total votes	10,093	100.00	
Registered voters/turnout	12,617	80.00	

Radovan Jojić of the Democratic Party served as mayor after the election.

===== Kosjerić =====
Results of the election for the Municipal Assembly of Kosjerić:

Party	Votes	%	Seats
Democratic Opposition of Serbia and Serbian Renewal Movement	5,256	55.39	21
Socialist Party of Serbia-Yugoslav Left Slobodan Milošević	3,342	35.22	4
Serbian Radical Party	579	6.10	–
Citizens' Group candidates	312	3.29	2
Total	9,489	100.00	27
Valid votes	9,489	96.75	
Invalid/blank votes	319	3.25	
Total votes	9,808	100.00	
Registered voters/turnout	11,644	84.23	

Novica Pantović, a member of the Democratic Party, served as mayor after the election. Goran Jeftović served as president of the assembly's executive committee.

===== Nova Varoš =====
Results of the election for the Municipal Assembly of Nova Varoš:

Party	Votes	%	Seats
Socialist Party of Serbia-Yugoslav Left Slobodan Milošević	5,110	39.74	13
Democratic Opposition of Serbia Dr. Vojislav Koštunica	3,294	25.62	8
Serbian Renewal Movement	2,410	18.74	6
Serbian Radical Party	1,891	14.71	–
Citizens' Group candidates	153	1.19	–
Total	12,858	100.00	27
Valid votes	11,858	96.97	
Invalid/blank votes	371	3.03	
Total votes	12,229	100.00	
Registered voters/turnout	16,263	75.20	

It may be noted that the Democratic Opposition of Serbia only fielded candidates in thirteen divisions and the Serbian Renewal Movement fielded candidates in only fourteen.

Milojko Šunjevarić served as mayor after the election, while Milenko Kolasinac served as deputy mayor. Both were members of the Democratic Party. Zoran Vasojević of the Serbian Renewal Movement served as president of the assembly's executive committee.

In 2002, the Socialists and the Serbian Renewal Movement joined forces to bring down the Democratic Opposition of Serbia administration. Milovan Glavonjić of the Socialists became mayor, Zoran Glavonjić became deputy mayor, and Vasojević continued in the role of executive committee president.

===== Požega =====
Results of the election for the Municipal Assembly of Požega:

Party	Votes	%	Seats
Socialist Party of Serbia-Yugoslav Left Slobodan Milošević	8,702	39.79	12
Democratic Opposition of Serbia Dr. Vojislav Koštunica	8,104	37.06	22
Democratic Opposition of Serbia and Serbian Renewal Movement	4,176	19.10	18
Serbian Radical Party	734	3.36	–
Citizens' Group candidates	152	0.70	–
Total	21,868	100.00	52
Valid votes	21,868	97.63	
Invalid/blank votes	531	2.37	
Total votes	22,399	100.00	
Registered voters/turnout	26,935	83.16	

The Democratic Opposition of Serbia fielded its own candidates in thirty-three divisions; in eighteen, it fielded candidates in conjunction with the Serbian Renewal Movement.

Milka Marinković of the Democratic Party served as mayor after the election.

===== Priboj =====
Results of the election for the Municipal Assembly of Priboj:

Party	Votes	%	Seats
Socialist Party of Serbia-Yugoslav Left Slobodan Milošević	6,616	39.82	27
Democratic Opposition of Serbia Dr. Vojislav Koštunica	4,848	29.18	11
Serbian Renewal Movement	1,759	10.59	–
Citizens' Group candidates	1,447	8.71	2
Serbian Radical Party	1,260	7.58	1
List for Sandžak Dr. Sulejman Ugljanin	612	3.68	–
League of Communists of Yugoslavia	74	0.45	–
Total	16,616	100.00	41
Valid votes	16,616	97.55	
Invalid/blank votes	418	2.45	
Total votes	17,034	100.00	
Registered voters/turnout	25,732	66.20	

Incumbent mayor Desimir Ćirković of the Socialist Party was confirmed for a new term in office after the election. Twenty-two members of the municipal assembly (i.e., a narrow majority of the forty-one member body) resigned their seats in early 2002, and on 14 February 2002 the Serbian government appointed a new provisional administration led by Milenko Milićević of the Democratic Party. A new municipal election took place one year ahead of schedule in 2003.

===== Prijepolje =====
Results of the election for the Municipal Assembly of Prijepolje:

Party	Votes	%	Seats
Socialist Party of Serbia-Yugoslav Left Slobodan Milošević	9,248	41.63	42
Democratic Opposition of Serbia Dr. Vojislav Koštunica	4,994	22.48	6
List for Sandžak Dr. Sulejman Ugljanin	3,312	14.91	8
Serbian Radical Party	1,896	8.53	2
Citizens' Group candidates	1,386	6.24	3
Serbian Renewal Movement	1,360	6.12	–
Serbian National Renewal	19	0.09	–
Total	22,215	100.00	61
Valid votes	22,215	96.68	
Invalid/blank votes	763	3.32	
Total votes	22,978	100.00	
Registered voters/turnout	33,625	68.34	

Incumbent mayor Stevan Purić of the Socialist Party was confirmed for another term in office after the election.

===== Sjenica =====
Results of the election for the Municipal Assembly of Sjenica:

Party	Votes	%	Seats
List for Sandžak Dr. Sulejman Ugljanin	4,971	32.12	21
Socialist Party of Serbia-Yugoslav Left Slobodan Milošević	3,965	25.62	11
Sandžak People's Movement	2,377	15.36	3
Democratic Opposition of Serbia Dr. Vojislav Koštunica	1,833	11.84	1
Citizens' Group candidates	1,643	10.62	3
Serbian Radical Party	570	3.68	–
Serbian Renewal Movement	116	0.75	–
Total	15,475	100.00	39
Valid votes	15,475	96.76	
Invalid/blank votes	518	3.24	
Total votes	15,993	100.00	
Registered voters/turnout	24,669	64.83	

Fuad Hrnjak of the List for Sandžak served as mayor after the election.
