= 2001 Serbian local elections =

Eighteen municipalities in Serbia held local elections on 4 November 2001. These were not part of the country's regular cycle of local elections but instead took place in certain jurisdictions where the local government had fallen.

== Results ==
=== Vojvodina ===
==== Titel ====
Results of the election for the municipal assembly of Titel:

Party	Seats
Democratic Opposition of Serbia (Democratic Party, League of Social Democrats of Vojvodina, New Democracy, Social Democratic Union)	14
Socialist Party of Serbia	5
Democratic Party of Serbia–My Vojvodina	2
Citizens' Group candidates	2
Movement for a Democratic Serbia	1
Serbian Renewal Movement	1
Total	25
Source: Only parties or alliances that won mandates are listed.

Milivoj Petrović of the Democratic Party had already become the leader of the local government prior to the 2001 vote and was confirmed as mayor following the election.

=== Central Serbia (excluding Belgrade) ===
==== Aleksinac ====
Results of the election for the Municipal Assembly of Aleksinac:

Party	Seats
Socialist Party of Serbia	22
Democratic Opposition of Serbia	13
Democratic Party of Serbia–Vojislav Koštunica	12
Serbian Renewal Movement	4
Citizens' Group candidates	3
Serbian Radical Party	1
Total	55
Source: Only parties or alliances that won mandates are listed.

Radoslav Pavković served as mayor after the election.

==== Batočina ====
Results of the election for the Municipal Assembly of Batočina:

Party	Seats
Democratic Party of Serbia–Vojislav Koštunica	10
Democratic Opposition of Serbia (Democratic Party, Christian Democratic Party of Serbia, New Democracy, Coalition for Šumadija)	10
Serbian Renewal Movement	6
Citizens' Group candidates	4
Socialist Party of Serbia	3
People's Party "Truth"	1
unknown/not listed	1
Total	35
Source: Only parties or alliances that won mandates are listed.

Miodrag Nikolić of the Democratic Party of Serbia was chosen as mayor after the election.
