= Milan Urošević =

Serbian politician

Milan Urošević (Serbian Cyrillic: Милан Урошевић; born 19 November 1985) is a politician in Serbia. He is a prominent local politician in Kragujevac and was elected to the National Assembly of Serbia in the 2020 parliamentary election. Urošević is a member of the Serbian Renewal Movement (Srpski pokret obnove, SPO).

== Early life and private career ==
Urošević graduated from Megatrend University's Faculty of Management in 2007. He is the owner of Radio "Stari grad" and founded the RSG media group in 2006. From 2011 to 2012, he served on the management board of Metal Sistema.

== Political career ==
Urošević joined the SPO in 2003 and was first elected to its main board in 2007. He appeared on the party's electoral list in the 2007 Serbian parliamentary election, in which the party did not cross the electoral threshold to win representation in the national assembly.

=== City of Kragujevac ===
The SPO formed an alliance with the Democratic Party (Demokratska stranka, DS) in 2008 and fielded candidates on the DS's For a European Serbia list in Kragujevac in the 2008 Serbian local elections. Urošević was given a position on the list, which finished in third place with fourteen seats out of eighty-seven. He was subsequently awarded a mandate as a SPO representative. In his first term, was deputy chair of the city assembly's committee for association and cooperation and chair of the committee for social policy.

For the 2012 Serbian local elections, the SPO formed an alliance with the Liberal Democratic Party (Liberalno demokratska partija, LDP) that was called Preokret (U-Turn). Urošević received the second position on the alliance's list in Kragujevac and was re-elected when the list won five mandates. He also received the fifty-fourth position on the Preokret list in the concurrent 2012 Serbian parliamentary election; the list won nineteen seats, and he was not elected. In 2013, he was chosen as deputy president (i.e., deputy speaker) of the Kragujevac municipal assembly.

The SPO subsequently aligned itself with the Serbian Progressive Party at the republic level. In October 2014, a shift in Kragujevac's political alliances resulted in the dismissal of longtime mayor Veroljub Stevanović and the creation of a new administration led by local Progressive Party leader Radomir Nikolić. The SPO joined the new alliance, albeit with some reluctance due – as Urošević noted – to its favourable working relationship with Stevanović in the past. Following the change in administration, Urošević was elected as chair (i.e., speaker) of the assembly.

The SPO's alliance with the Progressive Party subsequently broke down in Kragujevac, and Urošević emerged as a prominent local opponent of Nikolić (although not of Aleksandar Vučić, the Progressive Party leader at the republic level, whom he continued to support). The SPO and LDP fielded another coalition list in the 2016 local election, and Urošević appeared in the lead position. He was returned for a third term when the list won six seats. In this sitting of the assembly, he served as leader of a group called Сви на ову страну ("Everyone to this side"). In 2019, he said that the SPO would never join a local alliance with Progressive Party under Radimir Nikolić's leadership.

For the 2020 Serbian local elections, the SPO appeared on a shared list with Veroljub Stevanović's Together for Šumadija party. Stevanović led the list, with Urošević in the second position. He was returned again when the list won seventeen mandates, finishing second against the Progressive Party. He is now the leader of the SPO group in the city assembly.

=== Parliamentarian ===
The SPO's alliance with the Progressive Party at the republic level continued in the 2020 parliamentary election. Urošević appeared in the 130th position on the party's Aleksandar Vučić — For Our Children coalition list (ironically as he was running on a rival list at the municipal level) and was elected when the list won a landslide victory with 188 mandates. He is now a member of the committee on spatial planning, transport, infrastructure and telecommunications; a deputy member of the foreign affairs committee, the European integration committee, and the committee on the judiciary, public administration, and local self-government; and a member of the parliamentary friendship groups with Australia, Canada, Egypt, France, Germany, Israel, Kuwait, Oman, Poland, Saudi Arabia, the Sovereign Order of Malta, the United Arab Emirates, the United Kingdom, and the United States of America.
