= Branislav Kovačević =

Serbian politician

Branislav Kovačević (Serbian Cyrillic: Бранислав Ковачевић; 1 May 1953 – 14 December 2010), also known as Cole, was a playwright, politician, and activist in Serbia. A prominent opponent of Slobodan Milošević's government in the late 1990s, Kovačević was the leader of the League for Šumadija (Liga za Šumadiju, LZŠ) and served in the National Assembly of Serbia from 2001 to 2004.

== Early life and private career ==
Kovačević was born in Valjevo, in what was then the People's Republic of Serbia in the Federal People's Republic of Yugoslavia. He moved to Kragujevac as a child and lived there for the rest of his life. He was a graduate of the Faculty of Dramatic Arts at the University of Belgrade.

During the 1980s, he was the organizer, program editor, and artistic director of the Kragujevac Student Cultural Center. Following the reintroduction of multi-party politics to Serbia in 1990, he was among the first to organize public forums with representatives of opposition parties. In August 1991, following the start of the Croatian War, he organized the only peace concert in Serbia, with singers and actors from throughout the fragmenting country of Yugoslavia. He lost his job in the early 1990s due to his opposition activities.

Kovačević was hired as artistic director of Scena in 1994 and later became the company's director. After the victory of the opposition Zajedno coalition in Kragujevac in the 1996 Serbian local elections, he was chosen as deputy general-director of Radio-Television Kragujevac. He wrote and directed several plays, at one time staging his own work Balkan boj at the Princely Serbian Theatre.

== Politics ==
=== Early years ===
Kovačević joined with Ivan Đurić (then living in exile in Paris) to create the Movement for Democratic Freedoms (Pokret za demokratske slobode, PDS) in the 1990s. He later founded the League for Šumadija–Šumadjia Coalition in 1997 and appeared in the first position on its electoral list for the Kragujevac division in the 1997 Serbian parliamentary election. The list attracted few votes and did not win any seats.

In 1998, the League for Šumadija joined with Nenad Čanak's League of Social Democrats of Vojvodina (Liga socijaldemokrata Vojvodine, LSV) and other parties to form the Alliance of Democratic Parties (Savez demokratskih partija, SDP). Kovačević served as the alliance's coordinator. He organized a petition drive in Kragujevac for the dismissal of Yugoslavian president Slobodan Milošević from office in June 1999, after the conclusion of the Kosovo War. He later announced the petition drive's extension to other communities in Serbia. The SDP participated in a broader opposition movement called the Alliance for Change during this time, and Kovačević organized a number of public rallies in Kragujevac against Milošević.

The League for Šumadija joined the Democratic Opposition of Serbia (Demokratska opozicija Srbije, DOS), a diverse coalition of parties opposed to the Milošević administration, in 2000. Kovačević appeared in the third position on the DOS's electoral list for the Kragujevac division in the Yugoslavian Chamber of Citizens in the 2000 Yugoslavian parliamentary election. The list won two seats in the division, and he was not elected.

=== Parliamentarian ===
The 2000 Yugoslavian elections resulted in the downfall of Milošević's regime, and a new republican election was held in Serbia in December 2000. For this election, the entire country was counted as a single electoral division. The League for Šumadija continued its membership in the DOS, and Kovačević appeared on the alliance's list, in the eighteenth position, as the sole representative of his party. The DOS won a landslide majority victory with 176 out of 250 seats; Kovačević was granted a mandate and took his seat when the new assembly convened in January 2001. (From 2000 to 2011, mandates in Serbian parliamentary elections were awarded to successful parties or coalitions rather than individual candidates, and it was common practice for the mandates to be assigned out of numerical order. Kovačević's list position had no formal bearing on his chances of election.) During his time as a parliamentarian, he served on the DOS presidency and frequently represented the alliance in the media. He was a member of the culture and information committee.

The DOS was an alliance of several different parties that had opposed the Milošević administration, and there were many divisions among its constituent members. Kovačević was a frequent critic of the Democratic Party of Serbia (Demokratska stranka Srbije, DSS), one of the leading parties in the coalition. Shortly after the 2000 election, he criticized DSS leader (and new Yugoslavian president) Vojislav Koštunica for meeting with Slobodan Milošević. In May 2002, he joined with some other DOS party leaders to demand the DSS's expulsion from the coalition for what he described as "flagrant and continuous breaching of the coalition agreement." The DSS left the coalition not long afterward. In late 2002, Kovačević said that the DOS would move forward with new legislation despite a DSS boycott of the assembly.

Kovačević was a prominent ally of Nenad Čanak and, like him, was a supporter of increased decentralization in Serbia. In October 2001, he organized a declaration on the future of the Šumadija region that was endorsed by the League for Šumadija and other parties, including G17 Plus and Social Democracy. He later proposed dividing Serbia into provinces. In 2003, Kovačević rejected claims from New Serbia (Nova Srbija, NS) leader Velimir Ilić that he was promoting separatism.

For the 2003 parliamentary election, the League of Šumadija participated in the Together for Tolerance (Zajedno za toleranciju, ZZT) coalition with the LSV and other parties. Kovačević appeared in the lead position on the ZZT list, which narrowly missed the electoral threshold to win representation in the assembly. His parliamentary term ended in January 2004.

=== After 2003 ===
Serbia introduced the direct election of mayors for the 2004 Serbian local elections. Kovačević ran in Kragujevac and finished last in a field of eleven candidates. His electoral list also missed the threshold in the concurrent city assembly election.

In October 2004, Kovačević said that Internal Affairs minister Dušan Mihaljović had informed the DOS of the existence of mass graves in Serbia, resulting from the country's involvement in the Yugoslav Wars of the 1990s. He was quoted as saying, "Those graves, as far as I know, are located in various regions which are maybe under the control of some other bodies, which were not particularly ready to offer the possibility for revealing such a thing."

The LSV and the League for Šumadija participated in the 2007 parliamentary election on the list of the Liberal Democratic Party (Liberalno demokratska partija, LDP), and Kovačević was awarded the 101st position. The list won fifteen seats, and he was not given a new mandate. He did not return to political life after this time.

== Death ==
Kovačević died on 14 December 2010.

== Electoral record ==
=== Local (City of Kragujevac) ===
2004 City of Kragujevac local election Mayor of Kragujevac - First and Second Round Results
Candidate	Party or Coalition	Votes	%	Votes	%
Veroljub Stevanović Verko	Together for Kragujevac	22,032	38.59	32,610	73.72
Dragutin Radosavljević	Democratic Party–Boris Tadić	9,856	17.26	11,624	26.28
Slavica Đukić Dejanović	Socialist Party of Serbia	6,232	10.92		
Mileta Poskurica	Serbian Radical Party–Tomislav Nikolić	5,822	10.20		
Dragan Bataveljić	Strength of Serbia Movement–Bogoljub Karić	3,288	5.76		
Goran Davidović	Democratic Party of Serbia–Vojislav Koštunica	2,899	5.08		
Vladan Vučićević	New Serbia	2,479	4.34		
Dobrica Milovanović	For Our City	2,253	3.95		
Miroslav Marinković	G17 Plus–Miroljub Labus	1,094	1.92		
Radiša Pavlović	Workers' Resistance	574	1.01		
Branislav Kovačević Cole	League for Šumadija	562	0.98		
Total valid votes		57,091	100	44,234	100
