= Mileta Poskurica =

Serbian politician

Mileta Poskurica (Serbian Cyrillic: Милета Поскурица; born 11 July 1954) is an academic, medical doctor, and politician in Serbia. He served in the National Assembly of Serbia from 2004 to 2016 and was also active with municipal politics in Kragujevac. Poskurica entered politics as a member of the far-right Serbian Radical Party and subsequently joined the breakaway Serbian Progressive Party.

== Early life and academic career ==
Poskurica was born in Kragujevac, in what was then the People's Republic of Serbia in the Federal People's Republic of Yugoslavia. He graduated in 1978, completed a specialization in internal medicine in 1985, received his master's degree in 1989, and earned a Ph.D. in 1993. In 1998, he completed his subspeciality at the University of Belgrade Faculty of Medicine. He began working at the University of Kragujevac in 1984 and became a full professor in 2004.

== Politician ==
=== Municipal ===
Poskurica was the Radical Party's candidate for Kragujevac's sixth division in the 2000 Serbian local elections and was defeated by a candidate of the Democratic Opposition of Serbia (Demokratska opozicija Srbije, DOS). This was the last local election cycle in which assembly members were elected in constituencies; future elections were determined by proportional representation.

Serbia introduced the direct election of mayors in the 2004 local elections, and Poskurica was chosen the Radical Party's candidate for Kragujevac. He received the third position on the electoral list of the Radical Party in the 2008 local elections and was given a new mandate when the party won eighteen seats. (From 2000 to 2011, assembly mandates at the republic and local levels were awarded at the discretion of successful parties, and it was common practice for the mandates to be awarded out of numerical order. While Poskurica was not automatically re-elected by virtue of his list position, he was selected for a new mandate all the same.)

Serbia's electoral system was reformed in 2011, such that mandates were awarded to candidates on successful lists in numerical order. Poskurica had joined the Progressive Party by the 2012 Serbian local elections and received the second position on that party's local list. He was re-elected when the list won eighteen mandates, finishing second against the list of the rival United Regions of Serbia. He did not seek re-election in 2016.

=== Member of the National Assembly ===
Poskurica was first included on the Radical Party's electoral list at the republic level in the 2000 Serbian parliamentary election, in the 194th position. The list won twenty-three mandates, and he was not included in the party's assembly delegation. He was subsequently included in the party's lists in the national assembly elections of 2003, 2007, and 2008 and was awarded a mandate each time. The Radical Party served in opposition throughout this period.

The Radical Party experienced a serious split after the 2008 election, with several members joining the more moderate Forward Serbia parliamentary group under the leadership of Tomislav Nikolić. This movement was subsequently consolidated as the Serbian Progressive Party. Poskurica was among those who sided with Nikolić and joined the Progressives. He received the fortieth position on the party's Let's Get Serbia Moving list in the 2012 parliamentary election and was re-elected when the list won seventy-three mandates. The Progressives subsequently formed a new coalition government with the Socialist Party of Serbia and other parties. There were rumours that Poskurica would be appointed as minister of health in 2013, but this did not occur.

Poskurica became the leader of Serbia's delegation to the Interparliamentary Assembly on Orthodoxy in 2013. He ceded this position to Aleksandar Čotrić in 2014 but continued to serve in the delegation until his assembly term ended in 2016.

Poskurica received the twenty-eighth position on the Progressive Party's Aleksandar Vučić — Future We Believe In list in the 2014 Serbian parliamentary election and was elected to a fifth term when the list won a landslide victory with 158 seats. In 2015, he brought forward an amendment to Serbia's Law on Protection of the Population from Infectious Diseases that granted doctors the discretion to provide vaccinations for children. He said that the amendment was meant to send a message that parents should vaccinate their children and not be subject to misinformation from the anti-vaccination lobby. The amendment was unanimously approved by the assembly's health and family committee.

During his fifth term in parliament, Poskurica served on the health and family committee and the committee on education, science, technological development, and the information society, and was a member of the parliamentary friendship groups with Croatia, Cuba, Greece, Israel, Italy, Portugal, Russia, and Slovenia.

He was given the 154th position on the Progressive list in the 2016 Serbian parliamentary election. The list won 131 mandates, and he was not returned. He has not sought a return to politics since this time.

== Electoral record ==
=== Local (City of Kragujevac) ===
2004 City of Kragujevac election Mayor of Kragujevac - First and Second Round Results
Candidate	Party or Coalition	Votes	%	Votes	%
Veroljub Stevanović Verko	Together for Kragujevac	22,032	38.59	32,610	73.72
Dragutin Radosavljević	Democratic Party–Boris Tadić	9,856	17.26	11,624	26.28
Slavica Đukić Dejanović	Socialist Party of Serbia	6,232	10.92		
Mileta Poskurica	Serbian Radical Party–Tomislav Nikolić	5,822	10.20		
Dragan Bataveljić	Strength of Serbia Movement–Bogoljub Karić	3,288	5.76		
Goran Davidović	Democratic Party of Serbia–Vojislav Koštunica	2,899	5.08		
Vladan Vučićević	New Serbia	2,479	4.34		
Dobrica Milovanović	For Our City	2,253	3.95		
Miroslav Marinković	G17 Plus–Miroljub Labus	1,094	1.92		
Radiša Pavlović	Workers' Resistance	574	1.01		
Branislav Kovačević Cole	League for Šumadija	562	0.98		
Total valid votes		57,091	100	44,234	100

2000 City of Kragujevac election City Assembly of Kragujevac: Division 6
Dejan Ilić	Democratic Opposition of Serbia (Affiliation: New Democracy)	Elected
Dragan Mirković	Socialist Party of Serbia–Yugoslav Left	
Mileta Poskurica	Serbian Radical Party	
Arsenije Vujišić	Together for Kragujevac	
