= Vladan Vučićević =

Serbian politician

Vladan Vučićević (Serbian Cyrillic: Владан Вучићевић; born 17 September 1955) is a politician in Serbia. He served in the National Assembly of Serbia from 2004 to 2008 as a member of New Serbia (Nova Srbija, NS).

== Private career ==
Vučićević is a medical doctor specializing in maxillofacial surgery. He lives in Kragujevac.

== Politician ==
Vučićević entered political life in the 1990s as a member of the Serbian Renewal Movement (Srpski pokret obnove, SPO). He appeared in the third position on the party's electoral list for the Yugoslavian parliament's Chamber of Citizens in the 2000 Yugoslavian general election and was not elected when the party failed to cross the electoral threshold in the division. He also ran unsuccessfully for the City Assembly of Kragujevac in the concurrent 2000 local elections. He later left the SPO and joined New Serbia, although he offered praise for his former party in a 2007 interview.

=== Parliamentarian ===
New Serbia contested the 2003 Serbian parliamentary election on a combined electoral list with the SPO. Vučićević appeared in the forty-second position and was given a mandate when the list won twenty-two seats. (From 2000 to 2011, mandates in Serbian parliamentary elections were awarded to successful parties or coalitions rather than individual candidates, and it was common practice for the mandates to be assigned out of numerical order. Vučićević's specific list position had no bearing on his chances of election.) He took his seat when parliament convened in January 2004. After the election, New Serbia participated in a coalition government led by the Democratic Party of Serbia (Demokratska stranka Srbije, DSS), and Vučićević served as a supporter of the administration. He was deputy chair of the committee on transport and communications and a member of the health and family committee.

For the 2007 Serbian parliamentary election, New Serbia formed a new electoral alliance with the DSS. Vučićević was a candidate on their combined list and was awarded a mandate for a second term when the list won forty-seven seats. Following the election, New Serbia participated in Serbia's new coalition government, dominated by the DSS and the rival Democratic Party (Demokratska stranka, DS); Vučićević remained a government supporter. He was promoted to chair of the transport and communications committee and continued to serve on the health and family committee.

The fragile DS–DSS coalition broke down in early 2008, and a new parliamentary election was held in May of that year. Vučićević once again appeared on a shared DSS–NS list, in the forty-seventh position. The list fell to thirty mandates, and he was not given a mandate for a third term.

Serbia's electoral system was reformed in 2011, such that mandates were awarded in numerical order to candidates on successful lists. New Serbia contested the 2012 Serbian parliamentary election on the Let's Get Serbia Moving list led by the Serbian Progressive Party (Srpkska napredna stranka, SNS). Vučićević appeared in the 124th position; the list won seventy-three mandates and he was not re-elected.

=== Local politics ===
Although Vučićević was sometimes politically aligned with Veroljub Stevanović at the republic level, the two men were rivals in the local politics of Kragujevac. Vučićević was New Serbia's candidate for mayor in the 2004 Serbian local elections, the only regular electoral cycle since World War II in which mayors were directly elected. During the campaign, he was strongly critical of Stevanović's past record in office. He was defeated in the first round of voting; New Serbia's list won four out of eighty-seven seats in the concurrent city assembly elections, and he took a seat in that body.

In 2007, Vučićević led New Serbia in submitting criminal charges against a number of Stevanović's leading associates. He also filed a private lawsuit after Stevanović called him a "quack doctor" and questioned his academic credentials.

He appeared in the second position on a combined DSS–NS list in the 2008 local elections and received another mandate when the list won six seats.

Vučićević was given the tenth position on an SNS-led list in the 2012 local elections and was re-elected when the list won eighteen seats. Soon after the election, he announced his resignation from New Serbia. He initially served with the SNS's group in the local assembly, but by August 2012 he had become an independent member. He led his own independent list in the 2016 local elections; the list did not cross the threshold for assembly representation.

== Electoral record ==
=== Local (City of Kragujevac) ===
2004 City of Kragujevac local election Mayor of Kragujevac - First and Second Round Results
Candidate	Party or Coalition	Votes	%	Votes	%
Veroljub Stevanović Verko	Together for Kragujevac	22,032	38.59	32,610	73.72
Dragutin Radosavljević	Democratic Party–Boris Tadić	9,856	17.26	11,624	26.28
Slavica Đukić Dejanović	Socialist Party of Serbia	6,232	10.92		
Mileta Poskurica	Serbian Radical Party–Tomislav Nikolić	5,822	10.20		
Dragan Bataveljić	Strength of Serbia Movement–Bogoljub Karić	3,288	5.76		
Goran Davidović	Democratic Party of Serbia–Vojislav Koštunica	2,899	5.08		
Vladan Vučićević	New Serbia	2,479	4.34		
Dobrica Milovanović	For Our City	2,253	3.95		
Miroslav Marinković	G17 Plus–Miroljub Labus	1,094	1.92		
Radiša Pavlović	Workers' Resistance	574	1.01		
Branislav Kovačević Cole	League for Šumadija	562	0.98		
Total valid votes		57,091	100	44,234	100

2000 City of Kragujevac local election City Assembly of Kragujevac: Division 34
Dobrija Đurić	Socialist Party of Serbia–Yugoslav Left	
Milan Dojčilović	DEMOS – Movement for Europe	
Dušan Golubović	Democratic Opposition of Serbia (Affiliation: Democratic Party of Serbia)	Elected
Dobrosav Mihajlović	Serbian Radical Party	
Dr. Vladan Vučićević	Movement for Kragujevac (Affiliation: Serbian Renewal Movement)	
