= Goran Davidović =

Serbian politician and doctor

Goran Davidović (Serbian Cyrillic: Горан Давидовић; born 8 April 1968) is a medical doctor and former politician in Serbia. He served in the National Assembly of Serbia from 2004 to 2008 as a member of the Democratic Party of Serbia (Demokratska stranka Srbije, DSS).

He is not to be confused with an ultra-right-wing Serbian figure of the same name.

== Private career ==
Davidović is a cardiologist living in Kragujevac. He is a professor at the University of Kragujevac Faculty of Medical Sciences.

== Politician ==
Davidović received the twenty-second position on the DSS's electoral list in the 2003 Serbian parliamentary election. The list won fifty-three seats, and he was awarded a mandate when the assembly convened in January 2004. (From 2000 to 2011, mandates in Serbian parliamentary elections were awarded to successful parties or coalitions rather than individual candidates, and it was common practice for the mandates to be assigned out of numerical order. Davidović's specific list position had no bearing on his chances of election.) The DSS became the dominant force in Serbia's coalition government after the election, and Davidović served as a government supporter. He was a member of the health and family committee.

Serbia introduced the direct election of mayors in the 2004 Serbian local elections, and Davidović was the DSS's candidate in Kragujevac. He was eliminated in the first round of voting, finishing in sixth place. The DSS won six out of eighty-seven seats in the concurrent city assembly election, and Davidović took a seat in that body.

The DSS formed an electoral alliance with New Serbia (Nova Srbija, NS) for the 2007 Serbian parliamentary election, and Davidović appeared in the sixty-seventh position on their combined list. He was again chosen for a mandate when the list won forty-seven seats. The DSS formed an unstable coalition government with the rival Democratic Party (Demokratska stranka, DS) after the election, and Davidović again supported the administration. He continued to serve on the health and family committee and was also a member of the committee on science and technological development and the committee on labour, veterans, and social affairs.

The DS–DSS alliance broke down in early 2008, and a new parliamentary election was held in May of that year. The DSS continued its alliance with the NS, and Davidović received the fifty-first list position. The list fell to thirty mandates, and he was not given a mandate for a third term.

Davidović led the DSS–NS list for the Kragujevac city assembly in the concurrent 2008 local elections and was given another local mandate when the list won six seats. He resigned on 8 April 2009 and has not returned to political life since this time.

== Electoral record ==
=== Local (City of Kragujevac) ===
2004 City of Kragujevac local election Mayor of Kragujevac - First and Second Round Results
| Candidate | Party or Coalition | Votes | % | Votes | % |
|---|---|---|---|---|---|
| Veroljub Stevanović Verko | Together for Kragujevac | 22,032 | 38.59 | 32,610 | 73.72 |
| Dragutin Radosavljević | Democratic Party–Boris Tadić | 9,856 | 17.26 | 11,624 | 26.28 |
| Slavica Đukić Dejanović | Socialist Party of Serbia | 6,232 | 10.92 | | |
| Mileta Poskurica | Serbian Radical Party–Tomislav Nikolić | 5,822 | 10.20 | | |
| Dragan Bataveljić | Strength of Serbia Movement–Bogoljub Karić | 3,288 | 5.76 | | |
| Goran Davidović | Democratic Party of Serbia–Vojislav Koštunica | 2,899 | 5.08 | | |
| Vladan Vučićević | New Serbia | 2,479 | 4.34 | | |
| Dobrica Milovanović | For Our City | 2,253 | 3.95 | | |
| Miroslav Marinković | G17 Plus–Miroljub Labus | 1,094 | 1.92 | | |
| Radiša Pavlović | Workers' Resistance | 574 | 1.01 | | |
| Branislav Kovačević Cole | League for Šumadija | 562 | 0.98 | | |
| Total valid votes | | 57,091 | 100 | 44,234 | 100 |
