= Dragan Jevtović =

Serbian politician (1960–2025)

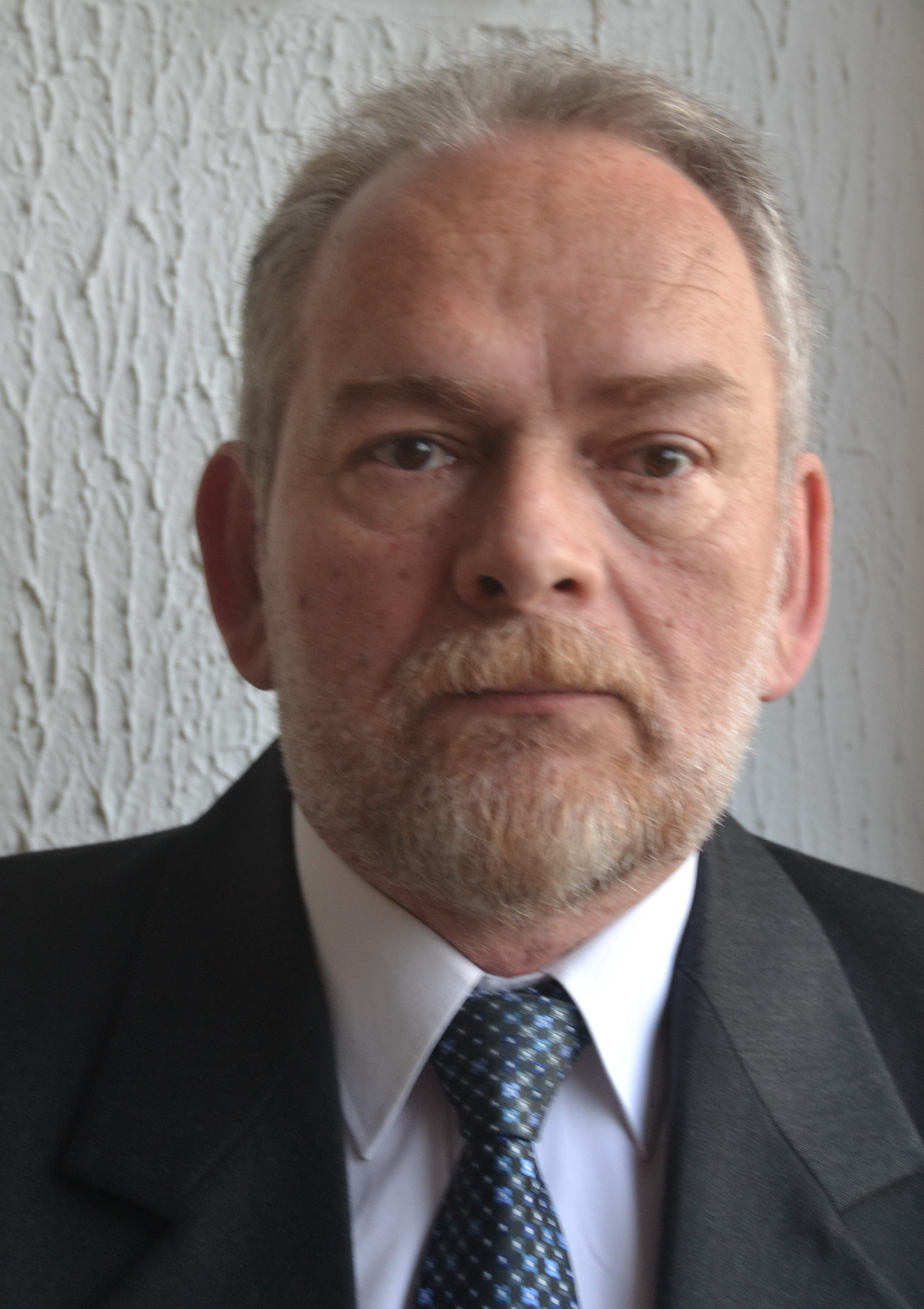

Dragan Jevtović (Serbian Cyrillic: Драган Јевтовић; 27 January 1960 – 1 July 2025) was a Serbian politician and administrator. He served in the National Assembly of Serbia from 1991 to 1993, originally as a member of the Serbian Renewal Movement (Srpski pokret obnove, SPO) and later with the Democratic Party (Demokratska stranka, DS). He also served in the Kragujevac city assembly.

== Early life and private career ==
Jevtović graduated from the University of Kragujevac Faculty of Mechanical Engineering in 1983, worked as an assistant trainee at the same institution from 1985 to 1991, and was an assistant from 1993 to 2001. In 1996, he defended his master's thesis at the faculty.

== Politician ==
Jevtović was elected to the national assembly in the 1990 Serbian parliamentary election, winning as a SPO candidate in Kragujevac's second division. The Socialist Party of Serbia (Socijalistička partija Srbije, SPS) won a majority victory while the SPO finished a distant second, serving in opposition. Jevtović took his seat when the assembly convened in early 1991.

In 1992, Jevtović left the SPO and joined the DS. He did not seek re-election to the national assembly in the 1992 Serbian parliamentary election but instead ran for the Chamber of Citizens in the parliament of the Federal Republic of Yugoslavia in the concurrent Yugoslavian parliamentary election. He appeared in the second position on the DS's electoral list in Kragujevac; the party did not cross the electoral threshold to win any seats in the division.

Jevtović later aligned himself with Veroljub Stevanović's Together for Kragujevac alliance. He sought election to the city assembly in the 2000 Serbian local elections but was defeated by Vlatko Rajković of the Democratic Opposition of Serbia (Demokratska opozicija Srbije, DOS). He ran again in the 2004 Serbian local elections, which were held under proportional representation. Stevanović's alliance won this election; Jevtović received a mandate and served as the group's leader in the assembly.

He appeared on Stevanović's list again in the 2008 local elections but did not afterward take a seat in the new assembly. In September 2013, he was appointed director of Kragujevac's directorate for urbanism.

== Death ==
Jevtović died on 1 July 2025, at the age of 65.

== Electoral record ==
=== Local (City of Kragujevac) ===
2000 Kragujevac city assembly election: Member for Division 41
Candidate	Party
Vlatko Rajković (***WINNER***)	Democratic Opposition of Serbia (Affiliation: Democratic Party)
Dragan Jevtović	Together for Kragujevac
Dragan Milanović	Serbian Radical Party
Slobodan Tanasijević	Socialist Party of Serbia–Yugoslav Left
Total

=== National Assembly of Serbia ===
1990 Serbian parliamentary election: Kragujevac Division 2
Candidate	Party
Milun Babić	New Democracy–Movement for Serbia
Slobodan Babić	Socialist Party of Serbia
Miroslav Bimbašić	Democratic Political Party "Roma" Kragujevac
Živomir Bogdanović	Serbian National Renewal
Jelena Vuković	Green Party
Dragan Jevtović (***WINNER***)	Serbian Renewal Movement
Dragoslav Marković	Citizens' Group
Dragan Zule Petrović	Liberal Party (Liberalna stranka)
Vlatko Rajković	Democratic Party
Jovan Savić	People's Radical Party
Dragoljub Stojanović	Union of Reform Forces of Yugoslavia
Milan Tišović	Citizens' Group
Total
