= List of mayors of Kragujevac =

Mayor of Kragujevac
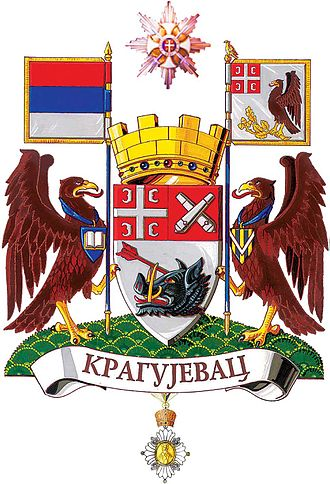
- Coat of arms of Kragujevac
- Incumbent; Nikola Dašić since 24 August 2020
- Style: Mayor
- Member of: City Council
- Reports to: City Assembly
- Residence: No official residence
- Seat: City Hall
- Term length: 4 years
- Inaugural holder: Vojislav Kalanović
- Formation: 1920

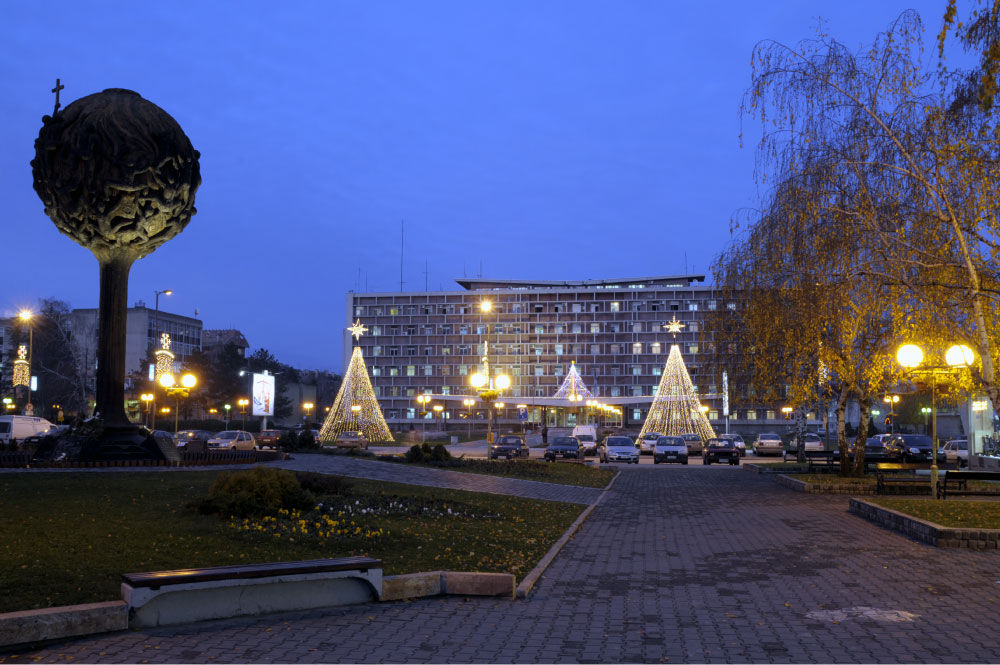
The City Hall - Office of the mayor.

This is a list of presidents of the Municipality of Kragujevac and mayors of Kragujevac since 1920.

The mayor of Kragujevac is the head of the City of Kragujevac (the fourth largest city in Serbia). He acts on behalf of the city, and performs an executive function in the City of Kragujevac. The current mayor of Kragujevac is Nikola Dašić (SNS).

== Kingdom of Serbs, Croats and Slovenes / Kingdom of Yugoslavia ==
- Vojislav Kalanović (1920 – 1933)
- Aleksa Obradović (1933 – 1935)
- Kamenko Božić (1935 – 1938)
- Dragomir Simović (1938 – 1939)
- Miloš Stevović (1939 – 1940)

== DF Yugoslavia / FPR Yugoslavia / SFR Yugoslavia ==
- Milutin Marković (1944 – 1947) (League of Communists of Yugoslavia)
- Milorad Mitrović (1947 – 1949) (League of Communists of Yugoslavia)
- Sreten Nikolić (1949 – 1950) (League of Communists of Yugoslavia)
- Momir Marković (1950 – 1955) (League of Communists of Yugoslavia)
- Momčilo Petrović (1955 – 1957) (League of Communists of Yugoslavia)
- Blagoje Kojadinović (1957 – 1963) (League of Communists of Yugoslavia)
- Obren Stojanović (1963 – 1967) (League of Communists of Yugoslavia)
- Milan Đoković (1967 – 1972) (League of Communists of Yugoslavia)
- Borivoje Petrović (1972 – 1981) (League of Communists of Yugoslavia)
- Milutin Milojević (1981 – 1984) (League of Communists of Yugoslavia)
- Kamenko Sretenović (1984 – 1988) (League of Communists of Yugoslavia)
- Predrag Galović (1988 – 1989) (League of Communists of Yugoslavia)
- Srboljub Vasović (1989 – 1992) (League of Communists of Yugoslavia / Socialist Party of Serbia)

== FR Yugoslavia / Serbia and Montenegro ==
Portrait	Name (Birth–Death)	Term of office		Party
	Živorad Nešić	1992	1996	Socialist Party of Serbia
	Veroljub Stevanović (born 1946)	1996	17 October 2000	Serbian Renewal Movement
	Vlatko Rajković (born 1959)	17 October 2000	8 October 2004	Democratic Party
	Veroljub Stevanović (born 1946)	8 October 2004	5 June 2006	Serbian Renewal Movement (until 2005)
	Veroljub Stevanović (born 1946)	8 October 2004	5 June 2006	Serbian Democratic Renewal Movement (from 2005)

== Republic of Serbia ==
Portrait	Name (Birth–Death)	Term of office		Party
	Veroljub Stevanović (born 1946)	5 June 2006	28 October 2014	Serbian Democratic Renewal Movement (until 2008)
	Veroljub Stevanović (born 1946)	5 June 2006	28 October 2014	Together for Kragujevac from 2009; Together for Šumadija (2008–2013; 2014)
	Veroljub Stevanović (born 1946)	5 June 2006	28 October 2014	United Regions of Serbia (2013–2014)
	Radomir Nikolić (born 1976)	28 October 2014	24 August 2020	Serbian Progressive Party
	Nikola Dašić (born 1975)	24 August 2020	Incumbent	Serbian Progressive Party

== Sources ==
- Web Page of the City of Kragujevac
