= Vlatko Rajković =

Serbian politician (born 1959)

Vlatko Rajković (Serbian Cyrillic: Влатко Рајковић; born 1959) is a politician in Serbia. He was the mayor of Kragujevac from 2000 to 2004 and also served in the Assembly of the Federal Republic of Yugoslavia and the successor Assembly of Serbia and Montenegro in the same period. A member of the Democratic Party (Demokratska stranka, DS) as an elected official, Rajković joined the New Party (Nova stranka, NOVA) in 2013. Vlatko Rajković joined PSG (Movement of the free citizens) in December 2022. and currently is head of local branch of PSG for Kragujevac and region of Central Serbia.

== Early life and private career ==
Rajković was born in Kragujevac, in what was then the People's Republic of Serbia in the Federal People's Republic of Yugoslavia. He was raised in the city, graduated from the University of Belgrade Faculty of Dentistry, and afterward operated his own dental practice.

== Politician ==
=== Early years (1990–2000) ===
Rajković was a founding member of the DS in Kragujevac when multi-party democracy was reintroduced to Serbia in 1990. He ran for the party in the city's second division in the 1990 Serbian parliamentary election and was defeated by Dragan Jevtović of the Serbian Renewal Movement (Srpski pokret obnove, SPO).

Serbia subsequently adopted a system of proportional representation for parliamentary elections, and Rajković appeared in the tenth position on the DS's electoral list for Krajugjevac in the 1992 election. The list did not cross the electoral threshold to win any mandates in the division. He later appeared in the twenty-fourth position on the party's list for the 1993 parliamentary election; the list won three seats, and he again did not receive a mandate. (From 1992 to 2000, Serbia's electoral law stipulated that one-third of parliamentary mandates would be assigned to candidates from successful lists in numerical order, while the remaining two-thirds would be distributed amongst other candidates on the lists at the discretion of the sponsoring parties. It was common practice for the latter mandates to be awarded out of order. Rajković could have been given a mandate despite his low position on the list, but he was not.) The Socialist Party of Serbia (Socijalistička partija Srbije, SPS) governed Serbia in this period, and the DS was one of a number of opposition parties seeking its overthrow.

The DS contested the 1996 local elections an alliance with the SPO and other opposition parties known as Zajedno (English: Together). The alliance won a majority victory in Kragujevac; unlike the situation in other major cities, the SPS did not contest the opposition's victory. SPO representative Veroljub Stevanović was chosen as mayor, and Rajković became deputy mayor. The Zajedno coalition fell apart at the republic level and in Belgrade in late 1997, but it held together in Kragujevac for the full term. In July 1999, Rajković helped lead the Kragujevac assembly in passing a motion calling for the resignation of Yugoslavian president Slobodan Milošević. In December of the same year, he introduced a motion calling for Milošević to be held accountable for war crimes committed in the territory of the former Socialist Federal Republic of Yugoslavia.

=== Mayor and federal parliamentarian (2000–04) ===
In 2000, the DS joined a broad and ideologically diverse coalition of opposition parties called the Democratic Opposition of Serbia (Demokratska opozicija Srbije, DOS). Rajković appeared in the lead position on the DOS's list in the Kragujevac division for the Yugoslavian assembly's Chamber of Citizens in the 2000 Yugoslavian general election and was elected when the list won two mandates in the division. Slobodan Milošević was defeated by DOS candidate Vojislav Koštunica in the concurrent presidential election, an event that prompted widespread political changes in Serbia and Yugoslavia; Rajković took part in the October 5 uprising that definitively removed Milošević from power. The DOS formed a coalition government with the Socialist People's Party of Montenegro in the Yugoslavian parliament, and Rajković served as a supporter of the administration.

He was also re-elected to the Kragujevac city assembly in the concurrent 2000 Serbian local elections, in which the DOS won a somewhat unexpected majority victory over both the SPS and Stevanović's alliance. After the election, he was chosen as president of the assembly, a position that was at the time equivalent to mayor. Kragujevac faced an economic downtown in the early 2000s, and in 2003 Rajković faced significant protests from the Workers' Resistance movement, which called on the government to fulfill its responsibility to pay the overdue salaries of Zastava Automobiles employees. Later in the same year, facing increased protests from different city collectives, he began an unusual hunger strike against what he described as the "immoral and illegal demands" of the protesters.

The Federal Republic of Yugoslavia was reconstituted as the State Union of Serbia and Montenegro in early 2003. The new country had a unicameral assembly with members nominated by the republican parliaments of Serbia and Montenegro; only sitting members of the republican parliaments and members of the former Yugoslavian parliament were eligible to serve. Rajković was chosen by the DS for a mandate in the new assembly.

He received the fifty-second position on the DS's electoral list in the 2003 Serbian parliamentary election. The entire country was by this time counted as a single electoral district, and from 2000 to 2011 mandates in Serbian parliamentary elections were distributed to candidates on successful lists at the discretion of the sponsoring parties or coalitions, irrespective of numerical order. Rajković was not given a seat in the Serbian parliament after the election, and his mandate in the federal parliament was not renewed in 2004.

Rajković was a close ally of DS leader and Serbian president Zoran Đinđić, who was assassinated in March 2003. He later supported Zoran Živković's bid to lead the DS in 2004; Živković was defeated by Boris Tadić.

=== Since 2004 ===
Serbia's local election system was reformed in 2004, such that mayors were directly elected and local assemblies were chosen under proportional representation. Veroljub Stevanović's Together for Kragujevac coalition won the assembly election, and Stevanović was returned to mayor's office. Rajković did not seek re-election as mayor but was instead re-elected to the assembly when the DS list won eighteen mandates. He led the party's assembly group in the term that followed.

The DS and the SPO once again united for the 2008 Serbian local elections in Kragujevac under the banner of the For a European Serbia coalition. Rajković appeared on the alliance's list and took a mandate when it won fourteen seats. He resigned his seat on 8 April 2009 and has not returned to electoral politics since this time.

A frequent critic of Boris Tadić's leadership of the DS, Rajković left the party in 2013 and joined the breakaway New Party under Zoran Živković.

== Electoral record ==
=== Local (City of Kragujevac) ===
2000 Kragujevac city assembly election: Member for Division 41
Candidate	Party
Vlatko Rajković (***WINNER***)	Democratic Opposition of Serbia (Affiliation: Democratic Party)
Dragan Jevtović	Together for Kragujevac
Dragan Milanović	Serbian Radical Party
Slobodan Tanasijević	Socialist Party of Serbia–Yugoslav Left
Total

=== National Assembly of Serbia ===
1990 Serbian parliamentary election: Member for Kragujevac II
Candidate	Party
Milun Babić	New Democracy–Movement for Serbia
Slobodan Babić	Socialist Party of Serbia
Miroslav Bimbašić	Democratic Political Party "Roma" Kragujevac
Živomir Bogdanović	Serbian National Renewal
Jelena Vuković	Green Party
Dragan Jevtović (***WINNER***)	Serbian Renewal Movement
Dragoslav Marković	Citizens' Group
Dragan Zule Petrović	Liberal Party (Liberalna stranka)
Vlatko Rajković	Democratic Party
Jovan Savić	People's Radical Party
Dragoljub Stojanović	Union of Reform Forces of Yugoslavia
Milan Tišović	Citizens' Group
Total
