= Dušan Golubović =

Serbian politician (born 1953)

Dušan Golubović (Serbian Cyrillic: Душан Голубовић; born 18 November 1953) is a politician in Serbia. He served in the National Assembly of Serbia from 2001 to 2004, initially as a member of the Democratic Party of Serbia (Demokratska stranka Srbije, DSS) and later with the Democratic Party (Demokratska stranka, DS). He has also held high public office in Kragujevac.

== Early life and private career ==
Golubović was born in Šabac, in what was then the People's Republic of Serbia in the Federal People's Republic of Yugoslavia. He moved to Kragujevac in 1959 and later graduated as a mechanical engineer. Until October 2000, he worked for Filip Kljajić as a product designer.

== Politician ==
Golubović contested the 1992 Serbian parliamentary election as a candidate of the Democratic Movement of Serbia (Demokratski pokret Srbije, DEPOS) alliance, appearing in the fourth position on its electoral list in the Kragujevac division. At the time, he was a member of the Serbian Renewal Movement (Srpski pokret obnove, SPO), one of the dominant parties in DEPOS. The list won seven mandates in the division, though Golobović was not subsequently included in his party's assembly delegation. (From 1992 to 2000, Serbia's electoral law stipulated that one-third of parliamentary mandates would be assigned to candidates from successful lists in numerical order, while the remaining two-thirds would be distributed amongst other candidates at the discretion of the sponsoring parties. It was common practice for the latter mandates to be awarded out of numerical order. Golubović's position on the list did not give him the automatic right to a seat in parliament.) He later left the SPO and joined the DSS.

During the late 1990s, Golubović was the DSS's leader in the Šumadija District and was active in the Alliance for Change, a multi-party opposition group. In November 1999, he said in an interview that the alliance was starting to disintegrate, accusing its leaders of having "travelled the world and conducted empty talks." In the same interview, he also accused Bernard Kouchner, the United Nations civil administrator in Kosovo, of ignoring the needs of the Kosovo Serb community.

The DSS later participated in the Democratic Opposition of Serbia (Demokratska opozicija Srbije, DOS), a broad and ideologically diverse coalition of parties opposed to Slobodan Milošević's administration. Golubović was elected to the Kragujevac city assembly in the 2000 Serbian local elections as a DOS candidate; the DOS won a somewhat unexpected majority government in the city, and he was appointed as leader of the city's executive council (i.e., effectively the local prime minister) when the new government was formed.

Slobodan Milošević was defeated by DSS leader Vojislav Koštunica in the 2000 Yugoslavian presidential election, which took place concurrently with the Serbian local elections. This event prompted widespread changes in the political culture of Serbia and Yugoslavia; among other things, Serbia's government fell and a new Serbian parliamentary election was called for December 2000. For this election, the entire country was counted as a single electoral division and all mandates were distributed to candidates on successful lists at the discretion of the sponsoring parties and coalitions, irrespective of numerical order. Golubović was given the thirty-fourth position on the DOS list, which won a landslide majority with 176 out of 250 seats, and was included in the DSS delegation when the assembly convened in January 2001. In parliament, he served on the traffic and communications committee.

The DSS subsequently became estranged from other parties in the DOS, and it formally left the alliance and moved into opposition in 2002. The parliamentary mandates of several DSS members, including Golubović, were nullified at the discretion of the DOS on 12 June 2002. This decision was subsequently revoked and the mandates restored.

Golubović's own relationship with the DSS later became strained, and on 18 December 2002 he was expelled due to "disrespect for party discipline." Later in the same day, he voted for the government's budget (which the DSS opposed). His departure from the DSS prompted a serious local split in the party's Kragujevac branch. In March 2003, Golubović joined the DS and became a member of its main board.

As the leader of Kragujevac's executive council, Golubović was responsible for overseeing the restructuring and privatization of a number of state-owned companies; in July 2003, he remarked that the process was running behind schedule due to the late opening of a privatization centre.

He received the one hundredth position on the DS's list in the 2003 Serbian parliamentary election. The list won thirty-seven seats, and he was not given a new mandate; his term in the assembly ended in January 2004. He also stood down as leader of Kragujevac's executive council after the 2004 local elections, and he does not seem to have returned to political life since this time.

== Electoral record ==
=== Local (City of Kragujevac) ===
2000 City of Kragujevac local election City Assembly of Kragujevac: Division 34
Dobrija Đurić	Socialist Party of Serbia–Yugoslav Left	
Milan Dojčilović	DEMOS – Movement for Europe	
Dušan Golubović	Democratic Opposition of Serbia (Affiliation: Democratic Party of Serbia)	Elected
Dobrosav Mihajlović	Serbian Radical Party	
Dr. Vladan Vučićević	Movement for Kragujevac (Affiliation: Serbian Renewal Movement)	
