= Živorad Nešić =

Serbian politician

Živorad Nešić (Serbian Cyrillic: Живорад Нешић; 1943–19 June 2025) was a Serbian politician. He was the mayor of Kragujevac from 1992 to 1996 and also served in the National Assembly of Serbia from 1993 to 1994. Nešić was a member of the Socialist Party of Serbia (SPS).

== Private career ==
Nešić was a graduated economist. He was the director of the company Žitoprodukt in Kragujevac for many years and was for a time chair of the board of directors of Credy Banka.

== Politician ==
Nešić was elected to the Kragujevac city assembly in the May 1992 Serbian local elections and was subsequently chosen its president, a position that was at the time equivalent to mayor. He was re-elected in the December 1992 local elections and was confirmed for another term in the same role.

Nešić received the eighth position on the Socialist Party's electoral list for the Kragujevac division in the 1992 Serbian parliamentary election, which took place concurrently with the December 1992 local elections. The list won eleven seats, and he was included in his party's delegation when the national assembly convened in January 1993. (From 1992 to 2000, Serbia's electoral law stipulated that one-third of parliamentary mandates would be assigned to candidates from successful lists in numerical order, while the remaining two-thirds would be distributed amongst other candidates at the discretion of the sponsoring parties. It was common practice for the latter mandates to be awarded out of numerical order. Nešić's position on the list did not give him the automatic right to a seat in parliament, but he was given a mandate all the same.)

The SPS won the largest number of seats in the 1992 parliamentary election but fell short of a majority. For a time, the party was able to govern through an informal alliance with the far-right Serbian Radical Party (SRS). This alliance broke down in later in 1993, however, a new parliamentary election was called for December of that year. Nešić was not a candidate, and his parliamentary term ended in January 1994.

In 1995, Nešić oversaw a controversial decision to bring the local journal Svetlost back under the control of the municipal assembly (which had relinquished its authority over the publication three years earlier).

The Socialist Party lost the 1996 local elections in Kragujevac to the Zajedno (English: Together) coalition of opposition parties. Unlike the situation in other Serbian cities, the government of Slobodan Milošević did not challenge the opposition's victory in Kragujevac. Nešić, who was re-elected to the city assembly, stood down as mayor and was replaced by Veroljub Stevanović. He was removed from the Socialist Party's city board for Kragujevac in June 1997, amid the backdrop of serious disagreements with the party leadership, and he was not a candidate in the 2000 local elections.

Nešić was re-elected to the Kragujevac city assembly on the Socialist Party's list in the 2004 local elections in Kragujevac and served a full term. He later appeared in the tenth position on the SPS list in the 2008 local elections and did not take a mandate when the list won eight seats.

== Death ==
Nešić died on 19 June 2025.
