= Opinion polling for the 2012 Serbian parliamentary election =

In the run up to the 2012 parliamentary elections in Serbia, various organisations carried out opinion polling to gauge voting intention in Serbia. The results of these polls are displayed in this article.

The date range for these opinion polls range from the previous parliamentary election, held on 11 May 2008, to the 2012 election, held on 6 May 2012. Most opinion polls predicted that the SNS had overtaken the ruling DS in 2010.

== Graphical summary ==
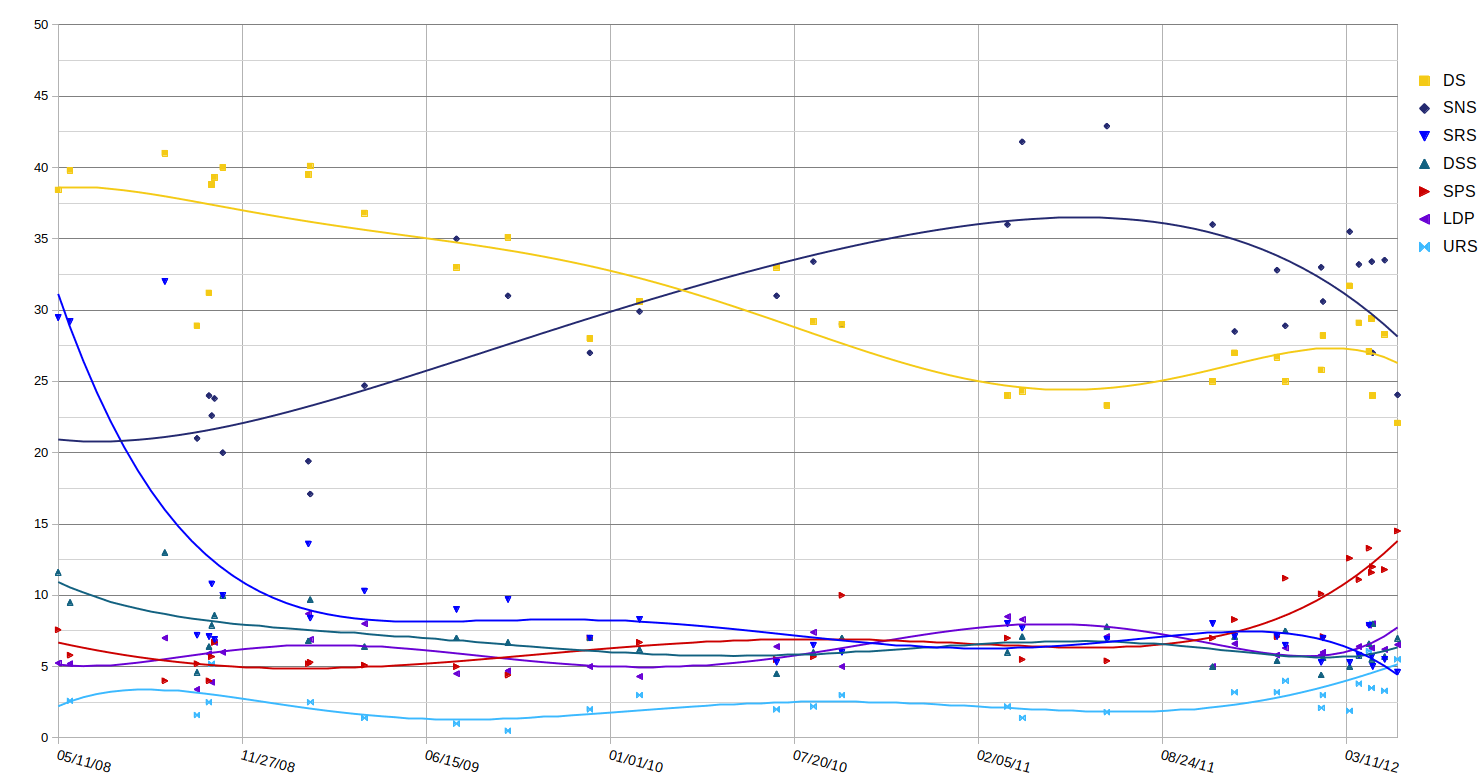

== Party vote ==
Poll results are listed in the tables below in reverse chronological order, showing the most recent first, and using the date the survey's fieldwork was done, as opposed to the date of publication. If such date is unknown, the date of publication is given instead. The highest percentage figure in each polling survey is displayed in bold, and the background shaded in the leading party's colour. In the instance that there is a tie, then no figure is shaded. The lead column on the right shows the percentage-point difference between the two parties with the highest figures. When a specific poll does not show a data figure for a party, the party's cell corresponding to that poll is shown empty.

Some long-standing coalitions implicitly included in several parties' ratings.

Polling Organization	Date	Sample size	DS	SRS	DSS	SPS	LDP	URS	SNS	Others	Lead
**2012 election**	6 May 12	N/A	22.07	4.62	6.99	14.51	6.53	5.51	**24.05**	15.72	1.98
Faktor Plus	14–22 Apr	1,084	28.3	5.5	5.7	11.8	6.2	3.3	**33.5**	5.7	5.2
IRI	8–9 Apr	1,400	24	5	8	12	8	8	**27**	8	3
Faktor Plus	2–8 Apr	1,160	29.4	5.7	5.5	11.6	6.3	3.5	**33.4**	4.6	4
eizbori.com	2–5 Apr	1,000	**27.1**	7.9	6.6	13.3	7.9	6.1	**27.1**	4	-
Faktor Plus	18–25 Mar	1,184	29.1	5.8	5.8	11.1	6.4	3.8	**33.2**	4.8	4.1
Partner Consulting	5–15 Mar	1,400	31.7	5.3	5	12.6	-	1.9	**35.5**	8	3.8
Faktor Plus	5–15 Feb	1,200	28.2	7	5.6	7.1	6	3	**30.6**	12.5	2.4
Partner Consulting	3–13 Feb	1,400	25.8	5.3	4.4	10.1	5.8	2.1	**33**	13.5 (Note: Including 3.2% for the PUPS (went in coalition with the SPS in 2008 and 2012), 1.6% for the LSV and 1.1% for the SDPS (both were part of the ZES and IBŽ coalitions around the DS in 2008 and 2012).)	7.2
NSPM	25 Dec–5 Jan	1,200	25	6.5	7.5	11.2	6.3	4.0	**28.9**	10.6	3.9
2012
Faktor Plus	19–27 Dec	1,200	26.7	7.1	5.4	7.1	5.8	3.2	**32.8**	11.9	6.1
NSPM	11 Nov	1,200	27	7.1	7.1	8.3	6.6	3.2	**28.5**	12.2	1.5
VIP	18 October	1,000	25	8	5	7	5	-	**36**	14	11
IFIMES International Institute	1–25 Jun	1,614	23.3	6.9	7.8	5.4	7.1	1.8	**42.9**	4.8	19.6
IFIMES International Institute	1–25 Mar	1,711	24.3	7.7	7.1	5.5	8.3	1.4	**41.8**	3.9	17.5
Danas	9 Mar	1,198	24	8	6	7	8.5	2.2	**36**	8.3	12
2011
CeSid	3–10 Sep	1,800	**29**	6	7	10	5	3	**29**	11	-
IRI	4–10 Aug	1,053	29.2	6.5	6	5.7	7.4	2.2	**33.4**	9.6	4.2
Danas	1 Jul	-	**33**	5.3	4.5	5.5	6.4	2	31	12.3	2
TNS Medium Gallup	28 Jan–2 Feb	1,200	**30.6**	8.3	6.2	6.7	4.3	3	29.9	11	0.7
2010
CeSid	1–10 Dec	5,000	**28**	7	7	7	5	2	27	17	1
Strategic Marketing	12 Sep	1,500	**35.1**	9.7	6.7	4.4	4.7	0.5	31	7.9	4.1
Danas	18 Jul	-	33	9	7	5	4.5	1	**35**	5.5	2
IRI	9 Apr	2,458	**36.8**	10.3	6.4	5.1	8	1.4	24.7	7.3	12.1
Politicum Agency	9 Feb	1,200	**40.1**	8.4	9.7	5.3	6.9	2.5	17.1	9.4	23
Strategic Marketing	7 Feb	-	**39.5**	13.6	6.8	5.2	8.7	(with DS)	19.4	6.8	20.1
2009
Strategic Marketing	6 Nov	-	**40**	10	10	-	6	-	20	14	20
CeSid	18–28 Oct	4,718	**39.3**	6.9	8.6	6.7	6.7	(with DS)	23.8	8	15.5
TNS Medium Gallup	20–25 Oct	1,020	**38.8**	10.8	7.9	5.7	3.9	5.2	22.6	5.1	6.2
Press Online	15–22 Oct	1,038	**31.2**	7.1	6.4	4	5.9	2.5	24	16.1	7.2
Strategic Marketing	9 Oct	-	**28.9**	7.2	4.6	5.2	3.4	1.6	21	28.1	7.9
Strategic Marketing	4 Sep	-	**41**	32	13	4	7	(with DS)	-	3	9
Strategic Marketing	22–24 May	1,086	**39.8**	29.2	9.5	5.8	5.2	2.6	-	7.9	10.6
**2008 election**	11 May 08	N/A	**38.42**	29.46	11.62	7.58	5.24	(with DS)	-	7.68	8.96
