= Together for Tolerance =

Serbian political coalition in 2003

Together for Tolerance (Serbian: Заједно за толеранцију, romanized: Zajedno za toleranciju) was a political coalition in Serbia. At the 2003 legislative elections in Serbia, held on December 28, 2003, the alliance won 4.2% of the popular vote, but no seats in the parliament. The alliance was formed by the League of Vojvodina Social Democrats, Alliance of Vojvodina Hungarians, the Sandžak Democratic Party, and the League for Šumadija.

The alliance was disbanded after the elections. Later, the League of Vojvodina Social Democrats, together with several other regionalist political parties from Vojvodina province, formed a new alliance named Together for Vojvodina.
