= Radomir Nikolić =

Serbian politician (born 1976)

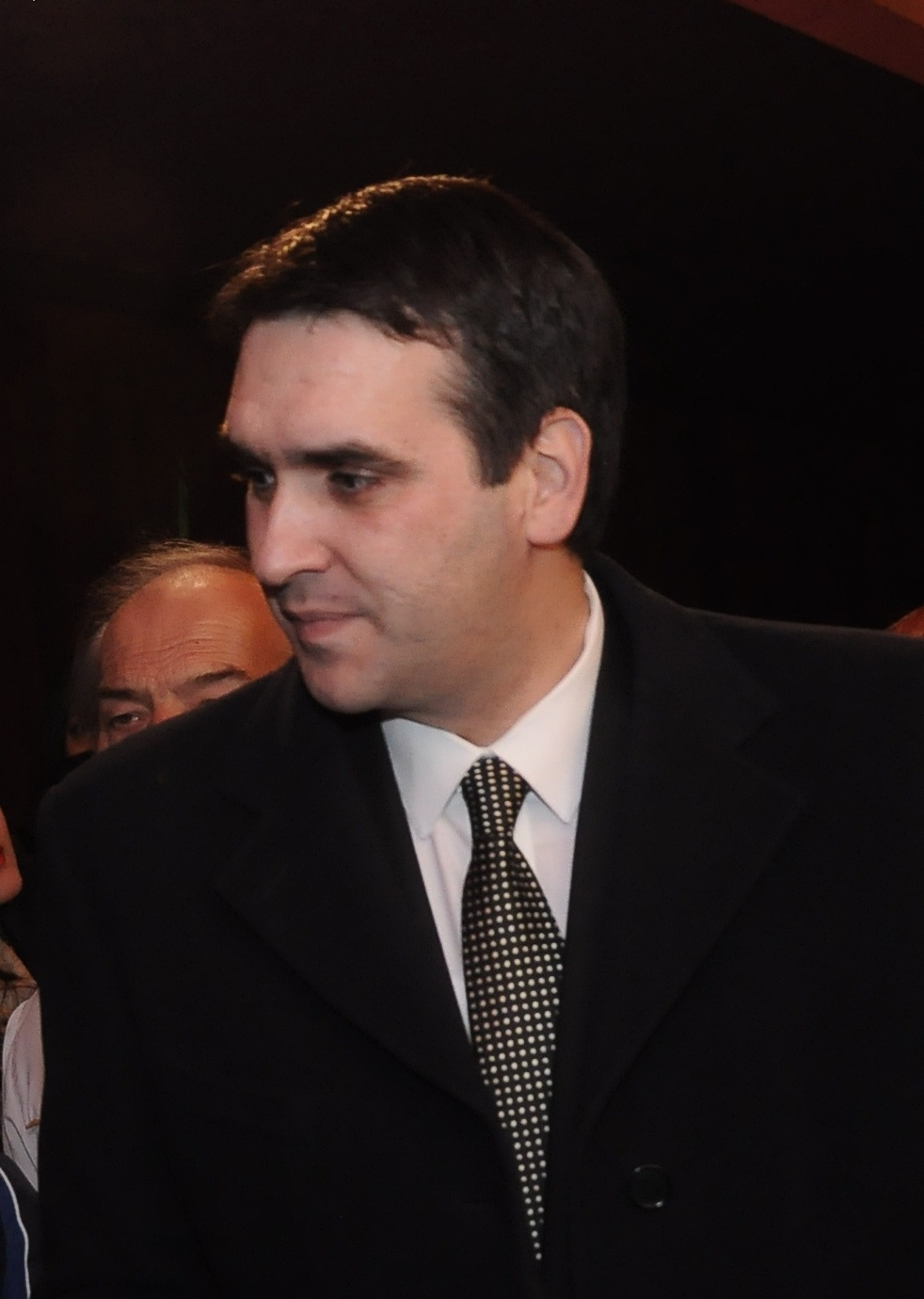

Mayor of Kragujevac
- In office 28 October 2014 – 24 August 2020
- Preceded by: Veroljub Stevanović
- Succeeded by: Nikola Dašić

Personal details
- Born: 2 February 1976 (age 50) Kragujevac, SFR Yugoslavia
- Party: Serbian Progressive Party
- Children: 3
- Parent(s): Tomislav Nikolić (Father); Dragica Ninković (Mother)

Radomir Nikolić (Serbian Cyrillic: Радомир Николић, born 2 February 1976) is a Serbian politician who served as the mayor of Kragujevac from 2014 until 2020.

== Biography ==
He was born in Kragujevac, Serbia. Nikolić is the son of Tomislav Nikolić, the former president of Serbia. He finished primary and high school in his hometown.

Nikolić completed his education in Belgrade, where he acquired the title of manager.

He was employed in the private and public sector, first as a salesman, then as an employee in Komercijalna Banka and Srbijagas.

He has been a member of the Serbian Progressive Party since its founding in 2008. He performed the function of the president of the Serbian Progressive Party board in Kragujevac in the period from 2010 to 2012.

In June 2012, he was elected vice president of the Main Board of the Serbian Progressive Party, and in October of the same year, president of the executive board of the Serbian Progressive Party. In the local elections in 2012, he was the first on the list of the board group of the Serbian Progressive Party.

He was elected the mayor of Kragujevac at the session of the City Assembly on October 28, 2014.

== Personal life ==
He is married and has three children.

== See also ==
- City of Kragujevac
- List of mayors of Kragujevac

Political offices
Preceded by Veroljub Stevanović	Mayor of Kragujevac; 2014–2020	Succeeded by Nikola Dašić
