= League for Šumadija =

Former political party in Šumadija, Serbia

League for Šumadija Лига за Шумадију Liga za Šumadiju
- Abbreviation: LZŠ
- Leader: Branislav Kovačević
- Founded: 1997
- Dissolved: c. 2007
- Ideology: Šumadija autonomism; Pro-Europeanism
- Political position: Centre to centre-left
- National affiliation: Democratic Opposition of Serbia (2000); Together for Tolerance (2003)
- Colors: Brown; Blue (customary)

The League for Šumadija (Serbian: Лига за Шумадију, romanized: Liga za Šumadiju; abbr. ЛЗШ or LZŠ), also known as the Šumadija Coalition, was a regionalist political party in the Šumadija region of Serbia in the late 1990s and 2000s. The party was one of the constituent members of the Democratic Opposition of Serbia (Demokratska opozicija Srbije, DOS) from 2000 to 2003. Its leader, Branislav Kovačević, was a member of the National Assembly of Serbia from 2001 to 2004 and served on the DOS presidency.

== History ==
=== Early years (1997–2000) ===
Kovačević founded the LZŠ in 1997 and appeared in the lead position on its electoral list for Kragujevac in the 1997 Serbian parliamentary election. The list received few votes and won no seats.

In 1998, Kovačević brought the LZŠ into a broader opposition group called the Alliance of Democratic Parties, which also included the League of Social Democrats of Vojvodina (Liga socijaldemokrata Vojvodine, LSV), the Reformist Democratic Party of Vojvodina (Reformska demokratska stranka Vojvodine, RDSV), the Alliance of Vojvodina Hungarians (Vajdasági Magyar Szövetség, VMSZ), the Social Democratic Union (Socijaldemokratska unija, SDU), and Rasim Ljajić's Sandžak Coalition. This group was involved in a series of protests against Slobodan Milošević's administration, both on its own and with the larger Alliance for Change coalition. Following the end of the Kosovo War in June 1999, it launched a petition drive urging Milošević's "unconditional resignation."

=== Democratic Opposition of Serbia (2000–03) ===
The LZŠ was one of eighteen parties to participate in the Democratic Opposition of Serbia in 2000. Serbia's electoral laws were reformed for that year's Serbian parliamentary election, such that the entire country was counted as a single electoral division. Kovačević was given the eighteenth position on the DOS's list and received a parliamentary mandate after the alliance won a landslide victory with 176 out of 250 seats.

Within the divided and fragmented DOS, the LZŠ was closely aligned with the LSV and other regionalist parties and was frequently critical of the Democratic Party of Serbia (Demokratska stranka Srbije, DSS), which Kovačević called to be expelled from the coalition in May 2002.

In October 2001, Kovačević organized a declaration on the future of the Šumadija region that was endorsed by the LZŠ and other parties, including G17 Plus and Social Democracy. He later proposed dividing Serbia into provinces. He rejected claims from New Serbia (Nova Srbija, NS) leader Velimir Ilić that he was promoting separatism.

=== Later years (2003–07) ===
With the breakup of the DOS in late 2003, the LZŠ joined a new coalition with many of the same groups that had previously been in the Alliance of Democratic Parties. Kovačević was given the lead position on the coalition's Together for Tolerance (Zajedno za toleranciju, ZZT) list in the 2003 Serbian parliamentary election. The list narrowly missed the electoral threshold to win representation in the assembly.

Kovačević ran for mayor of Kragujevic in the 2004 Serbian local elections and was defeated, finishing last in a field of eleven candidates. The LZŠ electoral list also missed the threshold in the concurrent city assembly election.

The LSV and the LZŠ participated in the 2007 parliamentary election in an alliance with the Liberal Democratic Party (Liberalno demokratska partija, LDP), and Kovačević was awarded the 101st position on the latter party's list. The list won fifteen seats, and he was not given a new mandate. The LZŠ appears to have dissolved shortly thereafter.
