= Veroljub Stevanović =

Serbian politician (born 1946)

Veroljub Stevanović Верољуб Стевановић
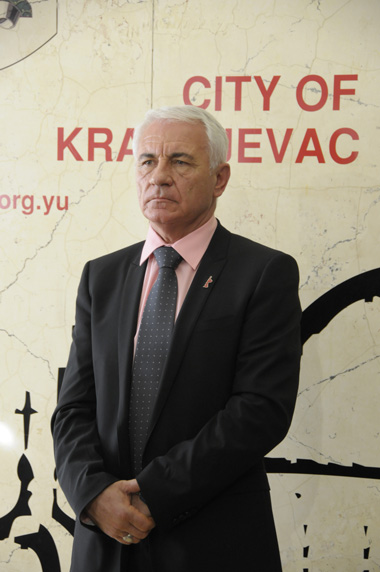

Mayor of Kragujevac
- In office 8 October 2004 – 28 October 2014
- Preceded by: Vlatko Rajković
- Succeeded by: Radomir Nikolić
- In office 1996 – 17 October 2000
- Preceded by: Živorad Nešić
- Succeeded by: Vlatko Rajković

Personal details
- Born: 17 September 1946 (age 80) Kragujevac, FPR Yugoslavia
- Party: SPO (1993–2005); SDPO (2005–2008); URS (2013–2015); ZZŠ (2009–2013; 2015–2020); ZS (2020–2022); POKS (2022–)

Veroljub "Verko" Stevanović (Serbian: Верољуб Верко Стевановић, born 17 September 1946, Kragujevac, FPR Yugoslavia) is a Serbian politician who served as the mayor of Kragujevac from 1996 to 2000 and again from 2004 to 2014.

== Biography ==
Stevanović graduated from the Faculty of Mechanical Engineering, University of Kragujevac in City of Kragujevac. His political career began in 1993, when he won his first seat in the Assembly of the Republic of Serbia, as a Member of the Serbian Renewal Movement. In 2006, he was Vice President of the Serbian Renewal Movement. In the interim Government of the Republic of Serbia 2000, he was co- minister of industry. In 1996, he became the first democratic Mayor of the City of Kragujevac.

In the first direct elections for mayor, held in 2004, he was re-elected Mayor for the City of Kragujevac. He is one of the founders of the regional party, Together for Kragujevac in Kragujevac, which won the local elections in 2008. He was a member of the National Assembly of Serbia for the first time as member of Serbian Renewal Movement. After leaving SPO, he was elected to the National Assembly of Serbia several times on various lists: DSS–NS list (2007), For a European Serbia (2008), United Regions of Serbia (2012) and For Just Serbia (2016). Now, he is a councilor of City Assembly of Kragujevac, as a member of Healthy Serbia.

== See also ==
- City of Kragujevac
- List of mayors of Kragujevac

== Gallery ==
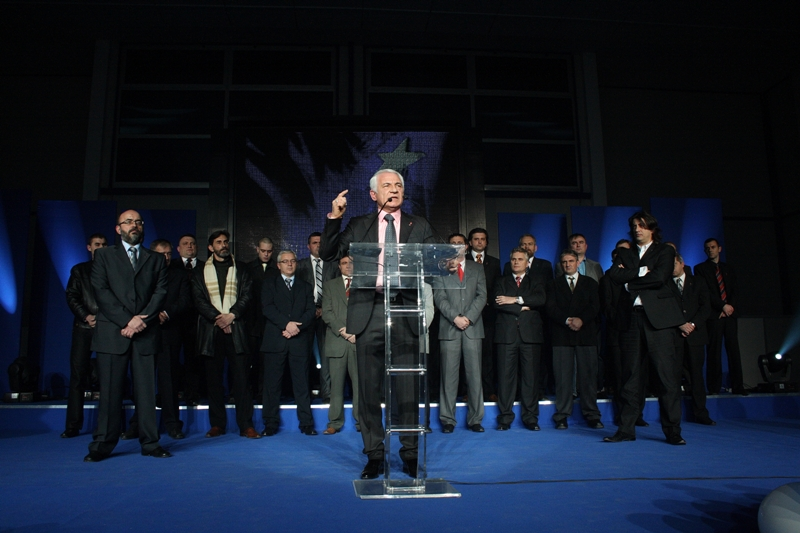
Together for Šumadija

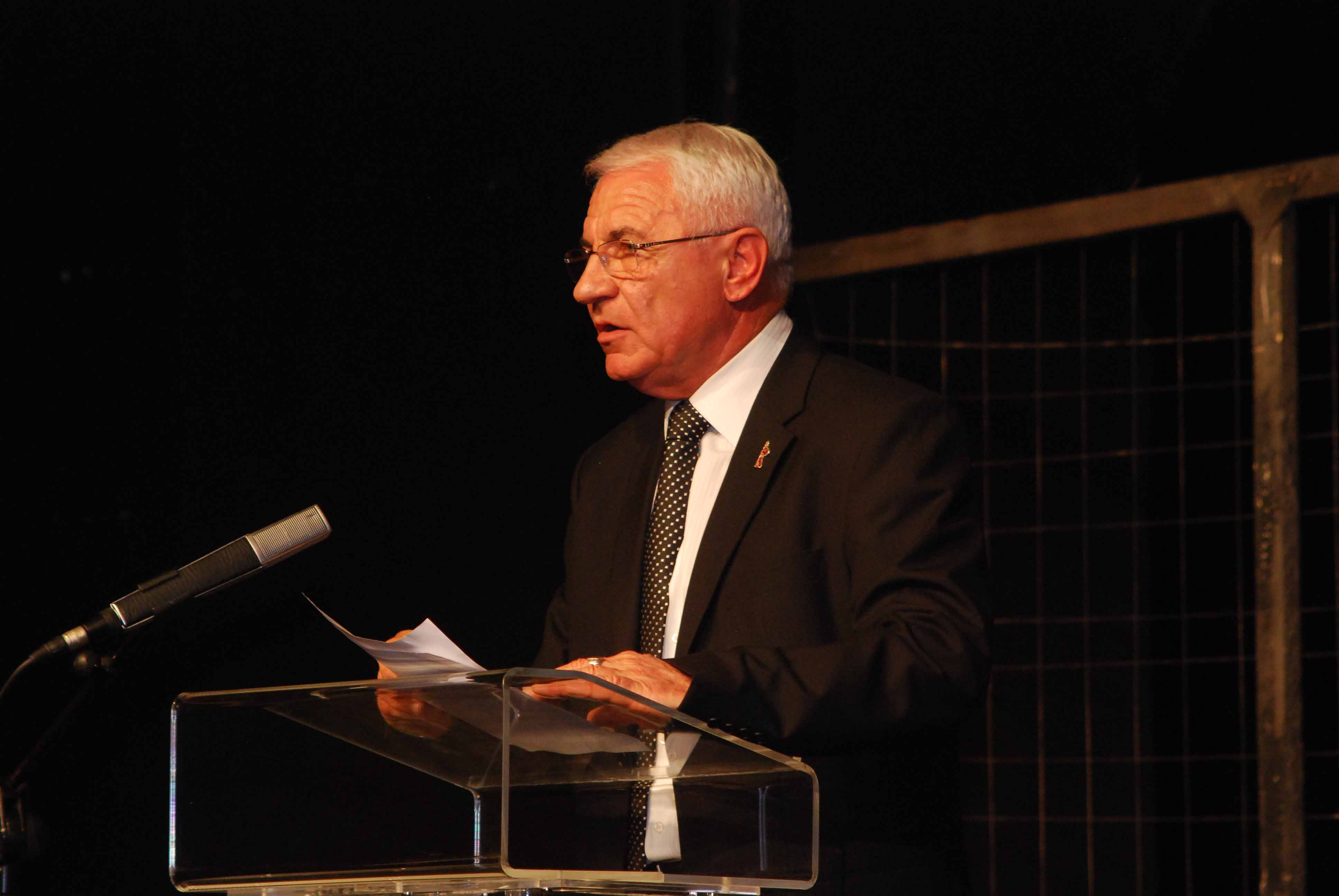
Veroljub Stevanović

Political offices
Preceded by Živorad Nešić	Mayor of Kragujevac; 1996–2000	Succeeded by Vlatko Rajković
Preceded by Vlatko Rajković	Mayor of Kragujevac; 2004–2014	Succeeded by Radomir Nikolić
