= Together for Šumadija =

Together for Šumadija Заједно за Шумадијy Zajedno za Šumadiju
- Leader: Veroljub Stevanović
- Founded: May 2, 2009 (First time); February 20, 2015 (Second time)
- Preceded by: Together for Kragujevac
- Merged into: United Regions of Serbia (2013–2015); Healthy Serbia (2020)
- Headquarters: Kragujevac
- Ideology: Liberal conservatism Decentralization; Pro-Europeanism; Atlanticism
- Political position: Centre-right
- National affiliation: NADA
- Colours: Blue
- National Assembly: 0 / 250

Together for Šumadija (Serbian: Заједно за Шумадијy / Zajedno za Šumadiju) is a minor liberal-conservative political party in Serbia. Founded on May 2, 2009, by the Together for Kragujevac movement and by a series of citizen advocacy groups and political parties in Šumadija (Central Serbia). The party's primary goals are decentralization, equal regional development and Euro-Atlantic integration of Serbia. The party leader Veroljub Stevanović was former mayor of Kragujevac.

The party merged into the United Regions of Serbia on 10 June 2013. However, Veroljub Stevanović announced his plan to revive the party in late 2014, and the necessary signatures were collected by 20 February 2015.

== Members of the Board ==
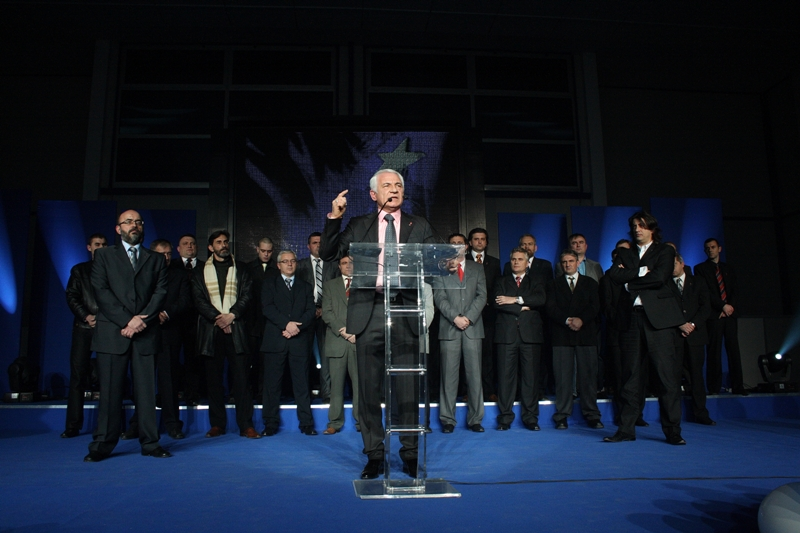
Together for Šumadija congress

- Veroljub Stevanović, President, Together for Kragujevac
- Branko Lazović, Deputy President, Together for Čačak
- Saša Milenić, Deputy President, Together for Kragujevac
- Nebojša Vasiljević, Deputy President, Together for Kragujevac
- Goran Jovanović, Smederevska Palanka
- Miladin Lazović, Čačak
- Zoran Đokić, Kruševac
- Dragan Gačić, Gornji Milanovac
- Željko Kušić, Topola
- Aleksandar Živanović, Kragujevac
- Slavica Saveljić, Kragujevac
- Srđan Biorac, Batočina
- Nada Milićević, Kragujevac
- Milan Marković, Kragujevac
- Ivica Samailović, Kragujevac
- Zlatko Milić, Director
- Zoran Palčić, Head of Information Center

== Presidency ==
- Veroljub Stevanović, Together for Kragujevac, Kragujevac
- Branko Lazović, Together for Čačak, Čačak
- Saša Milenić, Together for Kragujevac, Kragujevac
- Nebojša Vasiljević, Together for Kragujevac, Kragujevac
- Gradimir Jovanović - Together for Trstenik, Trstenik
- Danijel Jovanović - Together for Aleksandrovac, Aleksandrovac
- Adam Đokić - Together for Varvarin, Varvarin
- Dragan Mišović - Together for Knić and Gruža, Knić
- Dragan Gačić - Together for Gornji Milanovac, Gornji Milanovac
- Milan Ivković - Together for Topola, Topola
- Elena Milivojević - Together for Aranđelovac, Aranđelovac
- Milan Mitrović - Together for Levač, Rekovac
- Goran Jovanović - Together for Palanka, Smederevska Palanka
- Srđan Biorac - Together for Batočina, Batočina
- Slobodan Jakšić - Together for Čačak, Čačak
- Dejan Ivanović - Together for Sokobanja, Sokobanja
- Srđan Vidojević- Together for Rača, Rača

== Electoral history ==
=== Parliamentary elections ===
Year	Popular vote	% of popular vote	# of seats	Seat change	Coalition	Status
2009	Restructured from ZZK^{[a]}		2 / 250	▲2	–	gov't support
2012	215,666	5.51%	3 / 250	▲1	URS	gov′t support 2012–2013
2012	215,666	5.51%	3 / 250	▲1	URS	opposition 2013–2014
2014	109,167	3.04%	0 / 250	▼3	URS	non-parliamentary
2016	227,589	6.02%	1 / 250	▲1	With DS-Nova-ZZS-DSHV	opposition
2020	33,435	1.04%	0 / 250	▼1	With ZS-BS	non-parliamentary
2022			0 / 250		NADA	

^{a} Restructured from Together for Kragujevac movement, who was in the pre-election alliance with G17 Plus and appeared on the For a European Serbia electoral list, winning 2 parliamentary mandates.

=== Presidential elections ===
President of Serbia
Election year	#	Candidate	1st round votes	%	2nd round votes	%	Notes
2012	5th	Zoran Stanković	257,054	6.58	—	—	URS
2017	▲4th	Vuk Jeremić	206,676	5.66	–	–	Independent candidate; support
2022		Miloš Jovanović					NADA
