= 2012 Serbian local elections =

Serbia Election

Local elections in Serbia were held on 6 May 2012. Pursuant to the Constitution of Serbia, the parliamentary Speaker (at the time Slavica Đukić Dejanović from SPS) signed on 13 March 2012 the Decision on calling the elections for councilors of municipal assemblies, town assemblies and the Belgrade City Assembly for 6 May 2012, with the exception of: the councilors of the municipal assemblies of Aranđelovac, Bor, Vrbas, Vrnjačka Banja, Knjaževac, Kovin, Kosjerić, Kosovska Mitrovica, Leposavić, Negotin, Novo Brdo, Odžaci, Peć, Prijepolje and Ruma and councilors of the Priština Town Assembly, which have already had extraordinary elections in the period from 2008 to 2012, while for councilors of the municipal assembly of Kula, the elections were already called earlier on 29 February 2012.

Parties were required to cross a five per cent electoral threshold (of all votes, not only of valid votes), although this requirement was waived for parties representing national minority communities.

In line with United Nations SC Resolution 1244, the Government of the Republic of Serbia will, in cooperation with UNMIK, implement all actions necessary for the elections on the territory of the Autonomous Province of Kosovo and Metohija.

Some EU member states officials expressed their disagreement over the decisions to call local elections for municipalities in Kosovo and Metohija. Local elections will be observed by a delegation of the Congress of Local and Regional Authorities of the Council of Europe.

== Results ==
=== Belgrade ===
==== City of Belgrade ====
Party	Votes	%	Seats
Dragan Đilas Choice for a Better Belgrade (Democratic Party, Social Democratic Party of Serbia)	300,321	36.76	50
Let's Get Belgrade Moving–Tomislav Nikolić (Serbian Progressive Party, New Serbia, Democratic Party of Macedonians, Strength of Serbia Movement, Movement of Socialists)	219,198	26.83	37
Ivica Dačić–SPS–PUPS–JS–Milan Krkobabić	77,971	9.54	13
Democratic Party of Serbia–Vojislav Koštunica	63,724	7.80	10
Čedomir Jovanović–U-Turn (Liberal Democratic Party, Serbian Renewal Movement, Social Democratic Union, Rich Serbia, Democratic Party of Sandžak, Green Ecological Party – Greens)	41,181	5.04	–
Serbian Radical Party–Dr. Vojislav Šešelj	33,598	4.11	–
Dveri For the Life of Belgrade	30,441	3.73	–
Prof. Dr Zoran Stanković–United Regions of Serbia (G17 Plus, People's Party)	23,685	2.90	–
Movement of Workers and Peasants	7,610	0.93	–
Communist Party–Josip Broz	6,749	0.83	–
None of the Above	5,954	0.73	–
Social Democratic Alliance–Nebojša Leković	2,670	0.33	–
Citizens' Group: Movement of Suburban Municipalities–Jovan Sretković Jole	1,805	0.22	–
Serbian Monarchist Party "Serbian Unity"–Ljubomir Simić	913	0.11	–
NSD Belgrade–Dr. Dušan Janjić	907	0.11	–
Reformist Party–Mirko Beoković	356	0.04	–
Total	817,083	100.00	110
Valid votes	817,083	95.64	
Invalid/blank votes	37,220	4.36	
Total votes	854,303	100.00	
Registered voters/turnout	1,576,795	54.18	

The U-Turn list did not receive five per cent of the total vote and so fell below the electoral threshold.

==== Municipalities of Belgrade ====
Elections were held in fifteen of Belgrade's seventeen constituent municipalities. The exceptions were Voždovac and Zemun, where municipal elections were at the time held on different four-year cycles.

The elections generally were a victory for the Democratic Party, which claimed the mayoralties in nine of the fifteen participating municipalities. The Democratic Party also participated in grand coalition governments with the Progressives and Socialists in two other jurisdictions: Lazarevac (where the mayor was chosen from the ranks of the Socialists) and Rakovica (where the mayor was from the Progressives).

The Progressives also won the mayoralty in Grocka and formed a coalition in Surčin wherein a member of the Socialists was chosen as mayor. The United Regions of Serbia claimed the mayoralty in Obrenovac, and Živorad Milosavljević's independent list won its third consecutive victory in Sopot.

===== Barajevo =====
Results of the election for the Municipal Assembly of Barajevo:

Party	Votes	%	Seats
Let's Get Barajevo Moving–Tomislav Nikolić (Serbian Progressive Party, New Serbia, Movement of Socialists, Party of United Pensioners of Serbia–PUPS)	3,859	28.26	11
Dragan Đilas Choice for a Better Barajevo (Democratic Party, Social Democratic Party of Serbia)	3,448	25.25	10
Ivica Dačić–Socialist Party of Serbia (SPS)	2,100	15.38	6
Democratic Party of Serbia–Vojislav Koštunica	1,155	8.46	3
Citizens' group: Our Barajevo Rade Stevanović	1,058	7.75	3
Serbian Radical Party–Dr. Aleksandar Martinović	542	3.97	–
Čedomir Jovanović–U-Turn (Liberal Democratic Party, Serbian Renewal Movement, Social Democratic Union, Rich Serbia, Democratic Party of the Sandžak, Green Ecological Party – Greens)	540	3.95	–
Prof. Dr. Zoran Stanković–URS–Dipl. Inž. Vladeta Vićentijević (G17 Plus, People's Party)	487	3.57	–
Dragan Marković – Palma United Serbia	468	3.43	–
Total	13,657	100.00	33
Valid votes	13,657	95.60	
Invalid/blank votes	629	4.40	
Total votes	14,286	100.00	
Registered voters/turnout	23,174	61.65	

Incumbent mayor Branka Savić of the Democratic Party was confirmed for another term in office after the election with the support of seventeen delegates. The government was supported by the Democratic Party, Our Barajevo, two delegates from New Serbia, and one delegate each from the Socialist Party and the Party of United Pensioners of Serbia. The DS later formed a new coalition government in 2013 that included the Progressive Party.

On 16 September 2015, a new local administration was founded by Velibor Novićević of the Progressives in alliance with the Socialists and the Independent Democratic Party of Serbia. Novićević was in turn replaced by fellow Progressive Party member Saša Kostić on 3 December 2015. Kostić had the support of the Democratic Party, the Social Democratic Party, and some other delegates on taking office; he was later expelled from the Progressive Party and joined the Democratic Party of Serbia.

===== Čukarica =====
Results of the election for the Municipal Assembly of Čukarica:

Party	Votes	%	Seats
Choice for a Better Čukarica (Democratic Party, Social Democratic Party of Serbia)	28,111	33.06	17
Let's Get Čukarica Moving–Tomislav Nikolić (Serbian Progressive Party, New Serbia, Movement of Socialists, Strength of Serbia Movement) Tatjana Vidojević	22,984	27.03	14
Democratic Party of Serbia–Vojislav Koštunica–Uroš Janković	9,719	11.43	6
Ivica Dačić–Socialist Party of Serbia (SPS), Party of United Pensioners of Serbia (PUPS), United Serbia (JS) Slobodan Šolević	8,705	10.24	5
Čedomir Jovanović–U-Turn Vladeta Jovanović (Liberal Democratic Party, Serbian Renewal Movement)	5,295	6.23	3
Serbian Radical Party–Dr. Aleksandar Martinović Zdravko Topalović	3,599	4.23	–
Prof. Dr. Zoran Stanković–United Regions of Serbia Vladimir Vlajić (G17 Plus, People's Party)	2,840	3.34	–
Citizens' Group: Citizens' Club for the Municipalities of Žarkovo and Železnik	2,269	2.67	–
Citizens' Group: Movement of Workers and Peasants Čukarica Miloš Ivković	1,517	1.78	–
Total	85,039	100.00	45
Valid votes	85,039	95.31	
Invalid/blank votes	4,181	4.69	
Total votes	89,220	100.00	
Registered voters/turnout	170,277	52.40	

Zoran Gajić of the Democratic Party was chosen as mayor after the election; Uroš Janković of the Democratic Party of Serbia served as deputy mayor. In March 2014, a new administration was formed with Srđan Kolarić of the Progressive Party as mayor; he was supported by the Socialist alliance and by the Democratic Party of Serbia.

===== Grocka =====
Results of the election for the Municipal Assembly of Grocka:

Party	Votes	%	Seats
Let's Get Grocka Moving–Tomislav Nikolić (Serbian Progressive Party, New Serbia, Democratic Party of Macedonians, Strength of Serbia Movement, Movement of Socialists)	9,916	27.49	11
Dragan Đilas Choice for a Better Kaluđerica and Grocka (Democratic Party, Social Democratic Party of Serbia)	7,610	21.10	9
Ivica Dačić–Socialist Party of Serbia–Strength of the Citizens	6,786	18.81	8
Democratic Party of Serbia–Vojislav Koštunica	3,362	9.32	4
Prof. Dr. Zoran Stanković–United Regions of Serbia–Our Man Blažo Stojanović	3,012	8.35	3
Citizens' Group: Tomislav Simonović–Our Toma	1,780	4.93	–
Serbian Radical Party–Dr. Aleksandar Martinović	1,349	3.74	–
Čedomir Jovanović–U-Turn (Liberal Democratic Party)	1,054	2.92	–
Movement of Workers and Peasants	502	1.39	–
Dragan Marković Palma–United Serbia	401	1.11	–
Communist Party	298	0.83	–
Total	36,070	100.00	35
Valid votes	36,070	96.01	
Invalid/blank votes	1,499	3.99	
Total votes	37,569	100.00	
Registered voters/turnout	68,947	54.49	

Dragoljub Simonović of the Progressive Party was chosen as mayor after the election. He was replaced in December 2012 by Zoran Markov; Markov was in turn replaced by Stefan Dilberović in May 2014. Both Markov and Dilberović were also members of the Progressive Party.

===== Lazarevac =====
Results of the election for the Municipal Assembly of Lazarevac:

Party	Votes	%	Seats
Ivica Dačić–Socialist Party of Serbia (SPS), United Serbia (JS)	6,095	18.38	13
Dragan Đilas Choice for a Better Lazarevac (Democratic Party)	5,311	16.02	11
Let's Get Lazarevac Moving–Tomislav Nikolić (Serbian Progressive Party, Strength of Serbia Movement, Movement of Socialists, Party of United Pensioners of Serbia, Ecological Movement of Lazarevac)	4,855	14.64	10
Citizens' Group: Lazarevac–Our Home–Milan Đorđević – Đokin	4,200	12.67	8
Democratic Party of Serbia–Vojislav Koštunica	3,861	11.65	8
Citizens' Group: Club of Lazarevac Supporters	3,321	10.02	7
Serbian Radical Party–Dr. Aleksandar Martinović	2,115	6.38	4
Čedomir Jovanović–U-Turn (Liberal Democratic Party, Serbian Renewal Movement, Social Democratic Union, Rich Serbia, Democratic Party of the Sandžak, Green Ecological Party – Greens)	1,623	4.90	–
Prof. Dr. Zoran Stanković–United Regions of Serbia	1,207	3.64	–
Movement of Workers and Peasants (PRS)–Social Democratic Alliance	567	1.71	–
Total	33,155	100.00	61
Valid votes	33,155	95.55	
Invalid/blank votes	1,543	4.45	
Total votes	34,698	100.00	
Registered voters/turnout	52,109	66.59	

Dragan Alimpijević of the Socialist Party was chosen as mayor after the election. The local government was a grand coalition of the Socialists, the Democratic Party, and the Progressives.

===== Mladenovac =====
Results of the election for the Municipal Assembly of Mladenovac:

Party	Votes	%	Seats
Dragan Đilas Choice for a Better Mladenovac (Democratic Party, Social Democratic Party of Serbia)	8,116	29.39	19
Let's Get Mladenovac Moving–Tomislav Nikolić (Serbian Progressive Party, New Serbia, Party of United Pensioners of Serbia, Movement of Socialists)	7,422	26.88	18
Ivica Dačić–Socialist Party of Serbia (SPS) United Serbia (JS)–Dragan Marković Palma	3,129	11.33	7
Prof. Dr. Zoran Stanković–United Regions of Serbia–Slobodan Sekulić	2,743	9.93	6
Democratic Party of Serbia–Vojislav Koštunica	2,171	7.86	5
Čedomir Jovanović–U-Turn (Liberal Democratic Party, Serbian Renewal Movement, Social Democratic Union, Rich Serbia, Democratic Party of the Sandžak, Green Ecological Party – Greens)	1,216	4.40	–
Serbian Radical Party–Dr. Aleksandar Martinović	1,025	3.71	–
Citizens' Group: Dveri Mladenovac	897	3.25	–
Citizens' Group: "MLADENOVAC OUR HOME" Dr. Borivoje Mirosavić	892	3.23	–
Total	27,611	100.00	55
Valid votes	27,611	95.47	
Invalid/blank votes	1,310	4.53	
Total votes	28,921	100.00	
Registered voters/turnout	46,953	61.60	

Dejan Čokić of the Democratic Party was chosen as mayor after the election. Čokić was dismissed from office in July 2015, and Vladan Glišić (not to be confused with the future parliamentarian of the same name) led a provisional authority from 2015 to 2016.

===== New Belgrade =====
Results of the election for the Municipal Assembly of New Belgrade:

Party	Votes	%	Seats
Dragan Đilas Choice for a Better New Belgrade (Democratic Party, Social Democratic Party of Serbia)	45,670	40.95	31
Let's Get New Belgrade Moving–Tomislav Nikolić (Serbian Progressive Party, New Serbia, Democratic Party of Macedonians, Strength of Serbia Movement, Movement of Socialists)	26,547	23.80	18
Ivica Dačić–Socialist Party of Serbia (SPS), Party of United Pensioners of Serbia (PUPS)–Milan Krkobabić	11,166	10.01	7
Democratic Party of Serbia–Vojislav Koštunica	10,182	9.13	7
Čedomir Jovanović–U-Turn (Liberal Democratic Party, Serbian Renewal Movement, Social Democratic Union, Rich Serbia, Democratic Party of the Sandžak, Green Ecological Party – Greens)	6,967	6.25	4
Serbian Radical Party–Dr. Aleksandar Martinović	3,775	3.38	–
Prof. Dr. Zoran Stanković–United Regions of Serbia	3,129	2.81	–
Citizens' Group: SNP 1389–New Belgrade Knows–Miša Vacić	2,794	2.51	–
United Serbia–Dragan Marković Palma	1,295	1.16	–
Total	111,525	100.00	67
Valid votes	111,525	94.80	
Invalid/blank votes	6,118	5.20	
Total votes	117,643	100.00	
Registered voters/turnout	213,785	55.03	

Aleksandar Šapić, at the time a member of the Democratic Party, was chosen as mayor after the election with the support of forty delegates. The municipal government consisted of Choice for a Better New Belgrade, the Liberal Democratic Party, and the alliance around the Socialist Party.

Parliamentarian Marko Đurišić was elected from the twenty-fourth position on the DS list. He later joined the breakaway Social Democratic Party.

===== Obrenovac =====
Results of the election for the Municipal Assembly of Obrenovac:

Party	Votes	%	Seats
Let's Get Obrenovac Moving–Tomislav Nikolić (Serbian Progressive Party, New Serbia, Movement of Socialists, Strength of Serbia Movement, Party of United Pensioners of Serbia OO Obrenovac)	9,276	25.56	16
Dragan Đilas Choice for a Better Obrenovac (Democratic Party, Social Democratic Party of Serbia, "Greens")	6,968	19.20	12
Miroslav Čučković Čučko–United Regions of Serbia (Coalition: G17 Plus, I Live for Krajina)	6,591	18.16	12
"Ivica Dačić–Socialist Party of Serbia (SPS)–United Serbia (JS)"	4,685	12.91	8
Citizens' Group: "Obrenovac–Our City"–Svetozar Dobrašinović – Toza	3,962	10.92	7
Democratic Party of Serbia–Vojislav Koštunica	1,399	3.85	–
Čedomir Jovanović–U-Turn (Liberal Democratic Party, Serbian Renewal Movement, Social Democratic Union, Rich Serbia, Democratic Party of the Sandžak, Green Ecological Party – Greens)	1,229	3.39	–
Serbian Radical Party Dr. Aleksandar Martinović	1,115	3.07	–
Citizens' Group: Dveri–For the Life of Obrenovac	1,071	2.95	–
Total	36,296	100.00	55
Valid votes	36,296	96.06	
Invalid/blank votes	1,489	3.94	
Total votes	37,785	100.00	
Registered voters/turnout	65,179	57.97	

Miroslav Čučković of the United Regions of Serbia was chosen as mayor after the election.

===== Palilula =====
Results of the election for the Municipal Assembly of Palilula:

Party	Votes	%	Seats
Dragan Đilas Choice for a Better Palilula (Democratic Party)	28,282	35.93	24
Let's Get Palilula Moving–Tomislav Nikolić (Serbian Progressive Party, New Serbia, Strength of Serbia Movement, Movement of Socialists, Coalition of Refugee Associations in the Republic of Serbia)	18,878	23.99	16
Ivica Dačić–Socialist Party of Serbia (SPS), Party of United Pensioners of Serbia (PUPS), United Serbia (JS)	7,834	9.95	6
Democratic Party of Serbia–Vojislav Koštunica	6,299	8.00	5
Čedomir Jovanović–U-Turn (Liberal Democratic Party, Serbian Renewal Movement, Social Democratic Union, Rich Serbia, Democratic Party of the Sandžak, Green Ecological Party – Greens)	4,952	6.29	4
Serbian Radical Party–Dr. Aleksandar Martinović	3,962	5.03	–
Citizens' Group: Dunavski Venac–Movement for a New Municipality	3,078	3.91	–
Prof. Dr. Zoran Stanković–United Regions of Serbia	2,839	3.61	–
Movement of Workers and Peasants	1,447	1.84	–
Citizens' Group: Law and Justice for the Citizens of Our Municipality	1,136	1.44	–
Total	78,707	100.00	55
Valid votes	78,707	94.99	
Invalid/blank votes	4,155	5.01	
Total votes	82,862	100.00	
Registered voters/turnout	163,935	50.55	

Stojan Nikolić of the Democratic Party was chosen as mayor after the election. The municipal government consisted of the Democratic Party, the Liberal Democratic Party, and the coalition around the Socialist Party.

===== Rakovica =====
Results of the election for the Municipal Assembly of Rakovica:

Party	Votes	%	Seats
Let's Get Rakovica Moving–Tomislav Nikolić (Serbian Progressive Party, New Serbia, Strength of Serbia Movement, Democratic Party of Macedonians, Roma Party, Movement of Socialists)	16,625	31.44	17
Dragan Đilas Choice for a Better Rakovica (Democratic Party, Social Democratic Party of Serbia)	15,970	30.20	16
Ivica Dačić–Socialist Party of Serbia (SPS), Party of United Pensioners of Serbia (PUPS), United Serbia (JS)	6,671	12.62	7
Democratic Party of Serbia–Vojislav Koštunica	4,611	8.72	4
Čedomir Jovanović–U-Turn (Liberal Democratic Party, Serbian Renewal Movement, Social Democratic Union, Rich Serbia, Democratic Party of the Sandžak, Green Ecological Party – Greens)	3,405	6.44	3
Prof. Dr. Zoran Stanković–United Regions of Serbia	2,906	5.50	3
Serbian Radical Party–Dr. Aleksandar Martinović	2,688	5.08	–
Total	52,876	100.00	50
Valid votes	52,876	94.86	
Invalid/blank votes	2,864	5.14	
Total votes	55,740	100.00	
Registered voters/turnout	102,921	54.16	

The Radical Party received less than five per cent of the total vote and so fell below the electoral threshold.

Milosav Miličković of the Progressive Party was chosen as mayor after the election. The municipal government was a grand coalition consisting of the Progressives, the Democratic Party, and the Socialist Party's coalition. Miličković was replaced as mayor by Vladan Kocić in June 2014.

Zoran Krasić was the lead candidate on the Radical Party's list.

===== Savski Venac =====
Results of the election for the Municipal Assembly of Savski Venac:

Party	Votes	%	Seats
Dragan Đilas Choice for a Better Savski Venac (Democratic Party, Social Democratic Party of Serbia)	8,502	39.35	16
Let's Get Savski Venac Moving–Tomislav Nikolić (Serbian Progressive Party, New Serbia, Strength of Serbia Movement, Movement of Socialists)	4,841	22.40	9
Democratic Party of Serbia–Vojislav Koštunica	2,201	10.19	4
Ivica Dačić–Socialist Party of Serbia (SPS), Party of United Pensioners of Serbia (PUPS), United Serbia (JS)	2,159	9.99	4
Čedomir Jovanović–U-Turn (Liberal Democratic Party, Serbian Renewal Movement, Social Democratic Union, Rich Serbia, Democratic Party of the Sandžak, Green Ecological Party – Greens)	2,109	9.76	4
Serbian Radical Party Dr. Aleksandar Martinović	989	4.58	–
Prof. Dr. Zoran Stanković United Regions of Serbia	807	3.73	–
Total	21,608	100.00	37
Valid votes	21,608	94.00	
Invalid/blank votes	1,380	6.00	
Total votes	22,988	100.00	
Registered voters/turnout	43,578	52.75	

Dušan Dinčić of the Democratic Party was chosen as mayor after the election. His deputy was a member of the Socialist Party. Parliamentarians Nataša Vučković and Nenad Konstantinović were elected on the Democratic Party list.

===== Sopot =====
Results of the election for the Municipal Assembly of Sopot:

Party	Votes	%	Seats
Živorad Žika Milosavljević Citizens' Group: For the Municipality of Sopot	4,399	40.35	16
Let's Get Sopot Moving–Tomislav Nikolić (Serbian Progressive Party, New Serbia, Strength of Serbia Movement, Movement of Socialists)	2,243	20.58	8
Dragan Đilas Choice for a Better Sopot (Democratic Party)	1,174	10.77	4
Ivica Dačić—Socialist Party of Serbia (SPS)	814	7.47	3
Citizens' Group: Vladan Lukić	624	5.72	2
Čedomir Jovanović–U-Turn (Liberal Democratic Party, Serbian Renewal Movement, Social Democratic Union, Rich Serbia, Democratic Party of the Sandžak, Green Ecological Party – Greens)	454	4.16	–
Democratic Party of Serbia–Vojislav Koštunica	291	2.67	–
Serbian Radical Party–Dr. Aleksandar Martinović	272	2.50	–
Prof. Dr. Zoran Stanković–United Regions of Serbia–Dr. Bogdan Koroman	250	2.29	–
Citizens' Group: My Town–Nego Šta	196	1.80	–
Milan Krkobabić–Party of United Pensioners of Serbia (PUPS)–Branko Jovičić	184	1.69	–
Total	10,901	100.00	33
Valid votes	10,901	93.60	
Invalid/blank votes	745	6.40	
Total votes	11,646	100.00	
Registered voters/turnout	17,635	66.04	

Incumbent mayor Živorad Milosavljević of the For the Municipality of Sopot list was confirmed for another term in office after the election.

===== Stari Grad =====
Results of the election for the Municipal Assembly of Stari Grad:

Party	Votes	%	Seats
Dragan Đilas Dragan Đilas Choice for a Better Stari Grad (Democratic Party, Social Democratic Party of Serbia)	12,754	43.79	27
Let's Get Stari Grad Moving–Tomislav Nikolić (Serbian Progressive Party, New Serbia, Strength of Serbia Movement, Movement of Socialists)	4,285	14.71	9
Democratic Party of Serbia–Vojislav Koštunica	3,970	13.63	8
Čedomir Jovanović–U-Turn (Liberal Democratic Party, Serbian Renewal Movement, Social Democratic Union, Rich Serbia, Democratic Party of the Sandžak, Green Ecological Party – Greens)	3,692	12.68	8
Ivica Dačić–Socialist Party of Serbia (SPS)–Party of United Pensioners of Serbia (PUPS)–United Serbia (JS)	2,289	7.86	4
Serbian Radical Party Dr. Aleksandar Martinović	1,165	4.00	–
Prof. Dr. Zoran Stanković–United Regions of Serbia	972	3.34	–
Total	29,127	100.00	56
Valid votes	29,127	92.17	
Invalid/blank votes	2,474	7.83	
Total votes	31,601	100.00	
Registered voters/turnout	58,999	53.56	

Dejan Kovačević of the Democratic Party was chosen as mayor after the election. The municipal government included Choice for a Better Stari Grad and the alliance around the Socialist Party. Nemanja Šarović led the Radical Party's list, and Miljan Damjanović appeared in the second position.

===== Surčin =====
Results of the election for the Municipal Assembly of Surčin:

Party	Votes	%	Seats
Dragan Đilas Choice for a Better Surčin (Democratic Party, Social Democratic Party of Serbia)	6,071	26.24	11
Let's Get Surčin Moving–Tomislav Nikolić–Tomislav Nikolić (Serbian Progressive Party)	5,787	25.01	10
United Regions of Serbia–Dr. Vladan Janićijević	3,369	14.56	6
Citizens' Group: Movement for a Rich Surčin Jovan Cvetković–Jole	2,809	12.14	5
Ivica Dačić–Socialist Party of Serbia (SPS)	1,800	7.78	3
Dragan Marković Palma–United Serbia	1,018	4.40	–
Serbian Radical Party–Dr. Aleksandar Martinović	990	4.28	–
Democratic Party of Serbia–Vojislav Koštunica	800	3.46	–
Čedomir Jovanović–U-Turn (Liberal Democratic Party, Serbian Renewal Movement)	491	2.12	–
Total	23,135	100.00	35
Valid votes	23,135	96.15	
Invalid/blank votes	927	3.85	
Total votes	24,062	100.00	
Registered voters/turnout	36,171	66.52	

Vesna Šalović of the Socialist Party of Serbia was chosen as mayor after the election. The municipal government was formed by the Progressives, the United Regions of Serbia, and the Socialists.

===== Voždovac =====
There was no election for the Municipal Assembly of Voždovac in 2012. The previous election had taken place in 2009, and the next election took place in 2013.

===== Vračar =====
Results of the election for the Municipal Assembly of Vračar:

Party	Votes	%	Seats
Dragan Đilas Choice for a Better Vračar (Democratic Party)	16,098	49.90	25
Let's Get Vračar Moving–Tomislav Nikolić (Serbian Progressive Party, New Serbia, Democratic Party of Macedonians, Strength of Serbia Movement, Movement of Socialists)	5,056	15.67	7
Democratic Party of Serbia–Vojislav Koštunica	3,466	10.74	5
Čedomir Jovanović–U-Turn (Liberal Democratic Party, Serbian Renewal Movement, Social Democratic Union, Rich Serbia, Democratic Party of the Sandžak, Green Ecological Party – Greens)	3,053	9.46	4
Ivica Dačić–Socialist Party of Serbia (SPS) and Party of United Pensioners of Serbia (PUPS)	2,736	8.48	4
Serbian Radical Party–Dr. Aleksandar Martinović	990	3.07	–
United Regions of Serbia–Prof. Dr. Zoran Stanković	862	2.67	–
Total	32,261	100.00	45
Valid votes	32,261	93.96	
Invalid/blank votes	2,073	6.04	
Total votes	34,334	100.00	
Registered voters/turnout	63,290	54.25	

Incumbent mayor Branimir Kuzmanović of the Democratic Party was confirmed for a new term in office after the election, receiving the support of thirty-eight delegates. He was replaced by Tijana Blagojević, also of the Democratic Party, on 4 June 2015.

Konstantin Samofalov was re-elected to the municipal assembly from the third position on the Democratic Party's list.

===== Zemun =====
There was no election for the Municipal Assembly of Zemun in 2012. The previous election had taken place in 2009, and the next election took place in 2013.

===== Zvezdara =====
Results of the election for the Municipal Assembly of Zvezdara:

Party	Votes	%	Seats
Dragan Đilas Choice for a Better Zvezdara (Democratic Party, Social Democratic Party of Serbia)	26,351	37.79	23
Let's Get Zvezdara Moving–Tomislav Nikolić (Serbian Progressive Party, New Serbia, Democratic Party of Macedonians, Movement of Socialists)	14,480	20.77	12
Ivica Dačić–Socialist Party of Serbia (SPS), Party of United Pensioners of Serbia (PUPS), United Serbia (JS)	6,768	9.71	6
Čedomir Jovanović–U-Turn (Liberal Democratic Party, Serbian Renewal Movement, Social Democratic Union, Rich Serbia, Democratic Party of the Sandžak, Green Ecological Party – Greens)	5,630	8.07	5
Democratic Party of Serbia–Vojislav Koštunica	4,695	6.73	4
Dveri For the Life of Serbia	3,951	5.67	3
Serbian Radical Party, Dr. Aleksandar Martinović	2,430	3.48	–
Citizens' Group: Tomislav Nikolić All for Zvezdara	2,184	3.13	–
Prof. Dr. Zoran Stanković–United Regions of Serbia	1,946	2.79	–
Movement of Workers and Peasants	1,042	1.49	–
Serbian Monarchist Party "Serbian Unity"–Dragan Jovanović	254	0.36	–
Total	69,731	100.00	53
Valid votes	69,731	95.05	
Invalid/blank votes	3,633	4.95	
Total votes	73,364	100.00	
Registered voters/turnout	143,259	51.21	

Edip Šerifov of the Democratic Party was chosen as mayor after the election. The municipal coalition consisted of the Democratic Party, the Liberal Democratic Party, and the coalition around the Socialist Party.

Radmila Vasić was elected from the third position on the Dveri list.

Marija Leković was elected to the assembly from the third position on the Democratic Party list. She took her seat on 11 June 2012 and resigned on the same day upon being re-appointed to the municipal council (i.e., the executive branch of the municipal government). Her term in the latter role was brief; she resigned on 26 June 2012, having been appointed to the Belgrade city council.

=== Vojvodina ===
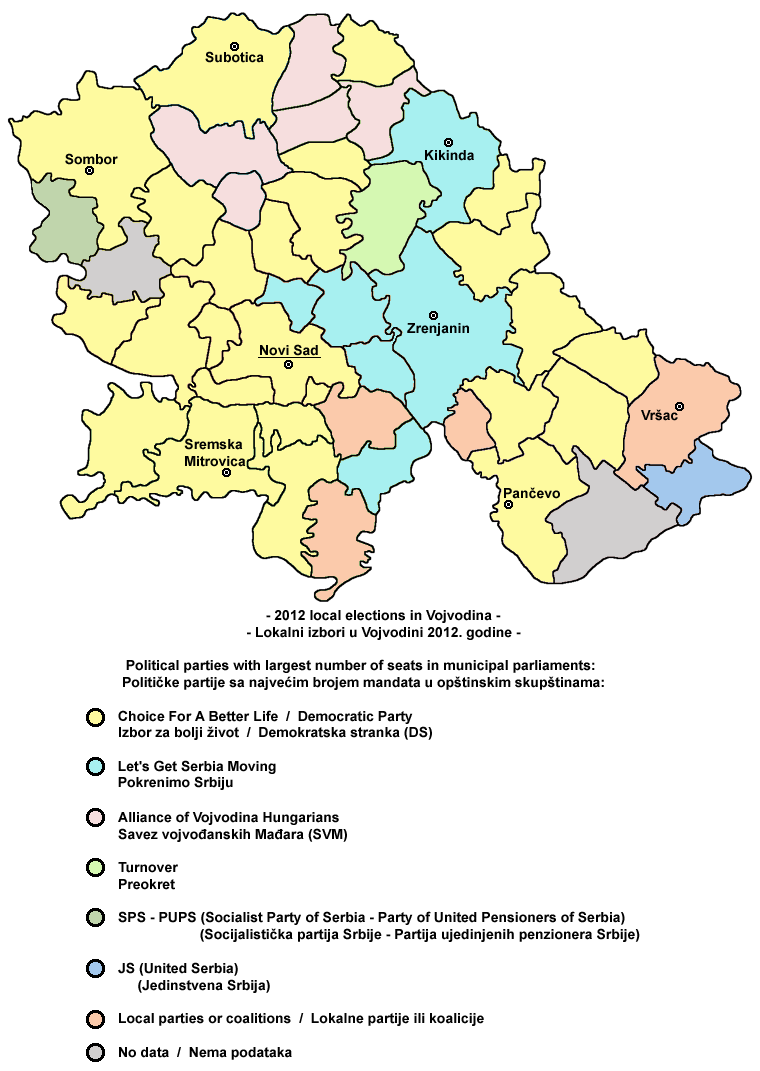
Results of 2012 local elections in Vojvodina by municipality

==== Central Banat District ====
Local elections were held in the one city (Zrenjanin) and all four municipalities in the Central Banat District. The Progressives won the city election in Zrenjanin and remained in power for the full term. The Democrats finished first in three of the municipalities, with the Liberal Democrats winning the other. There were many changes in government in the latter jurisdictions over the next four years. The Progressives held the mayoralties in two of these communities by the 2016 election, with the League of Social Democrats of Vojvodina holding another; the fourth mayor was an independent who later joined the Progressives.

===== Zrenjanin =====
Results of the election for the City Assembly of Zrenjanin:

Party	Votes	%	Seats
Let's Get Zrenjanin Moving–Tomislav Nikolić (Serbian Progressive Party, Democratic Party of Serbia–Dr. Vojislav Koštunica, New Serbia, Strength of Serbia Movement, Movement of Socialists, Democratic Party of Macedonians, Forward Movement Banat)	17,684	30.80	25
Democratic Party–Boris Tadić	11,253	19.60	15
League of Social Democrats of Vojvodina–Nenad Čanak	9,253	16.11	13
Ivica Dačić–Socialist Party of Serbia (SPS), Party of United Pensioners of Serbia (PUPS), United Serbia (JS)	5,828	10.15	8
Serbian Radical Party–Dr. Aleksandar Martinović	3,251	5.66	4
"Dveri For the Life of Zrenjanin"	2,414	4.20	–
Čedomir Jovanović–U-Turn, Liberal Democratic Party, Social Democratic Union, Vojvodina's Party	2,375	4.14	–
Alliance of Vojvodina Hungarians–István Pásztor	1,986	3.46	2
Equality Movement–I Love Zrenjanin	1,943	3.38	–
For the Survival of Zrenjanin–United Regions of Serbia–Dušan Juvanin	1,433	2.50	–
Total	57,420	100.00	67
Valid votes	57,420	95.57	
Invalid/blank votes	2,662	4.43	
Total votes	60,082	100.00	
Registered voters/turnout	108,291	55.48	

Goran Knežević of the Progressive Party was chosen as mayor after the election, with the support of the Socialists, as well as of a single delegate from the League of Social Democrats and a delegate from the Serbian Renewal Movement (who had been elected on the League of Social Democrats list). Knežević resigned on 21 August 2012 after being appointed to a cabinet position in the government of Serbia and was replaced by fellow Progressive Party member Ivan Bošnjak. Bošnjak, in turn, resigned on 12 June 2014 after being appointed as a state secretary in the Serbian government; he was replaced by Čedomir Janjić, also of the Progressives.

===== Nova Crnja =====
Results of the election for the Municipal Assembly of Nova Crnja:

Party	Votes	%	Seats
Democratic Party Pera Milankov	2,108	34.44	11
Citizens' Group: Dragiša Latinović–Solidarity	823	13.45	4
Ivica Dačić–Socialist Party of Serbia (SPS), Party of United Pensioners of Serbia (PUPS), United Serbia (JS)	746	12.19	4
Let's Get Nova Crnja Moving–Tomislav Nikolić (Serbian Progressive Party)	635	10.38	3
Alliance of Vojvodina Hungarians–István Pásztor	625	10.21	3
Citizens' Group: Vladimir Zečević	306	5.00	–
United Regions of Serbia–Dejan Stojanović	288	4.71	–
Čedomir Jovanović–U-Turn	250	4.08	–
Serbian Radical Party–Dr. Aleksandar Martinović	201	3.28	–
League of Social Democrats of Vojvodina–Nenad Čanak	138	2.25	–
Total	6,120	100.00	25
Valid votes	6,120	95.46	
Invalid/blank votes	291	4.54	
Total votes	6,411	100.00	
Registered voters/turnout	9,071	70.68	

Incumbent mayor Pera Milankov of the Democratic Party was confirmed for a new term in office after the election. He was arrested in October 2012 on suspicion of giving and accepting bribes and was replaced by Mile Todorov of the Socialist Party, who formed a coalition government with the Progressives and other parties on 20 November 2012. The Socialist-Progressive alliance subsequently broke down, and on 31 May 2013 Todorov was replaced by Danica Stričević of the Progressives, who formed an administration in alliance with the United Regions of Serbia (which had gained members by defections).

After spending a year in custody, Pera Milankov (by this time an independent) was again chosen as mayor on 28 December 2013 at the head of a new governing alliance that included the Democratic Party, the Socialists, and the Alliance of Vojvodina Hungarians. Shortly after the 2016 elections, Milankov joined the Progressive Party.

===== Novi Bečej =====
Results of the election for the Municipal Assembly of Novi Bečej:

Party	Votes	%	Seats
Milivoj Miša Vrebalov–U-Turn	3,320	25.69	8
Let's Get Novi Bečej Moving–Tomislav Nikolić (Serbian Progressive Party, Democratic Party of Serbia–Dr. Vojislav Koštunica, New Serbia, Economic Revival Movement of Serbia)	3,132	24.24	8
Democratic Party–Boris Tadić	1,893	14.65	5
"Ivica Dačić–Socialist Party of Serbia (SPS), Party of United Pensioners of Serbia (PUPS)"	1,028	7.96	2
Serbian Radical Party–Dr. Aleksandar Martinović	1,017	7.87	2
League of Social Democrats of Vojvodina–Nenad Čanak	867	6.71	2
Alliance of Vojvodina Hungarians–István Pásztor	854	6.61	2
United Regions of Serbia–Mlađan Dinkić	810	6.27	2
Total	12,921	100.00	31
Valid votes	12,921	96.45	
Invalid/blank votes	475	3.55	
Total votes	13,396	100.00	
Registered voters/turnout	20,372	65.76	

Saša Šućurović of the Liberal Democratic Party (one of the parties in the Preokret coalition) was chosen as mayor after the election, governing in a coalition with the Democratic Party and League of Social Democrats of Vojvodina. A new coalition government was formed in May 2013, led by the Liberal Democratic Party and the Progressives; Šućurović continued as mayor, and local Progressive Party leader Saša Maksimović became speaker of the assembly.

In September 2015, Šućurović left the Liberal Democrats and joined the League of Social Democrats. Once again, he continued to serve as mayor.

Ivica Milankov was elected to the assembly from the lead position on the Radical Party's list.

===== Sečanj =====
Results of the election for the Municipal Assembly of Sečanj:

Party	Votes	%	Seats
Democratic Party–Predrag Milošević Karasi	3,352	45.52	11
Let's Get Sečanj Moving–Tomislav Nikolić (Serbian Progressive Party–Democratic Party of Serbia)	1,261	17.13	5
"Ivica Dačić–Socialist Party of Serbia (SPS), Party of United Pensioners of Serbia (PUPS), United Serbia (JS)"	1,228	16.68	4
League of Social Democrats of Vojvodina–Nenad Čanak	452	6.14	1
United Regions of Serbia–Zorica Marinić	401	5.45	1
Serbian Radical Party–Dr. Aleksandar Martinović	398	5.41	1
Čedomir Jovanović–U-Turn–Zoran Škrbić (LDP, SPO)	271	3.68	–
Total	7,363	100.00	23
Valid votes	7,363	96.31	
Invalid/blank votes	282	3.69	
Total votes	7,645	100.00	
Registered voters/turnout	11,802	64.78	

Incumbent mayor Predrag Milošević, at the time a member of the Democratic Party, was confirmed for another term in office after the election. He joined the Progressive Party in 2014, taking most of the local Democratic Party organization with him.

===== Žitište =====
The results of the election for the Municipal Assembly of Žitište were as follows:

Party	Votes	%	Seats
Democratic Party–Boris Tadić	2,438	25.81	9
Ivica Dačić–Socialist Party of Serbia (SPS)–Party of United Pensioners of Serbia (PUPS) United Serbia (JS)	2,191	23.20	8
Let's Get Žitiste Moving–Tomislav Nikolić (Serbian Progressive Party, New Serbia)	1,180	12.49	4
League of Social Democrats of Vojvodina–Nenad Čanak	953	10.09	3
Alliance of Vojvodina Hungarians–István Pásztor	793	8.40	3
Democratic Party of Serbia–Vojislav Koštunica	788	8.34	2
United Regions of Serbia–Aleksandar Meng	589	6.24	2
Serbian Radical Party–Dr. Aleksandar Martinović	370	3.92	–
Social Democratic Party of Serbia–Rasim Ljajić	144	1.52	–
Total	9,446	100.00	31
Valid votes	9,446	95.29	
Invalid/blank votes	467	4.71	
Total votes	9,913	100.00	
Registered voters/turnout	15,572	63.66	

Dušan Milicev of the Socialist Party was chosen as mayor after the election. Milicev was succeeded by Ljubinko Petković of the Democratic Party in June 2013, and Petković was in turn succeeded by Mitar Vučurević of the Progressive Party (which had gained several members by defections) two months later.

==== North Bačka District ====
Local elections were held in the one city (Subotica) and both of the municipalities in the North Bačka District. The Democratic Party's coalition won a plurality victory in Subotica and initially claimed the city's mayoralty. The Alliance of Vojvodina Hungarians won the most votes in the other two municipalities and claimed the mayoralty in Baćka Topola, while the Democratic Party took the mayoralty in Mali Iđoš. In 2013, both Democratic Party mayors were replaced; the Alliance of Vojvodina Hungarians took the mayoralty in Subotica, with the Socialist Party taking the office in Mali Iđoš.

===== Subotica =====
Results of the election for the City Assembly of Subotica:

Party	Votes	%	Seats
"Choice for a Better Life–Boris Tadić" (Democratic Party, Social Democratic Party of Serbia, Democratic Alliance of Croats in Vojvodina)	18,849	26.67	20
Alliance of Vojvodina Hungarians	15,914	22.52	16
Let's Get Subotica Moving–Tomislav Nikolić (Serbian Progressive Party, New Serbia)	7,634	10.80	8
List for Serbia (DSS, SRS, SDS)–Mr. Bogdan Laban	5,869	8.30	6
League of Social Democrats of Vojvodina–Nenad Čanak	4,650	6.58	4
Čedomir Jovanović–U-Turn–LDP–SPO	4,193	5.93	4
Ivica Dačić–Socialist Party of Serbia (SPS), Party of United Pensioners of Serbia (PUPS), United Serbia (JS)	4,145	5.87	4
United Regions of Serbia (G17 Plus, Bunjevac Party of Vojvodina, People's Party)	2,639	3.73	–
Mirko Bajić–Alliance of Bačka Bunjevci	1,921	2.72	2
Bunjevac Party–Blaško Gabrić	1,206	1.71	1
Hungarian Hope Movement–Bálint László	1,157	1.64	1
Democratic Party of Vojvodina Hungarians–Almási Szilárd	1,149	1.63	1
Citizens' Group: "Solidarity"–Olajoš Nađ Mikloš	804	1.14	–
All Together: DZH, DZVM, BDZ, GSM, Slovak Party–Đ. Čović	540	0.76	–
Total	70,670	100.00	67
Valid votes	70,670	95.90	
Invalid/blank votes	3,024	4.10	
Total votes	73,694	100.00	
Registered voters/turnout	130,956	56.27	

Modest Dulić of the Democratic Party was chosen as mayor after the election. The governing majority consisted of the Democratic Party, the Alliance of Vojvodina Hungarians, the Democratic Party of Serbia, the League of Social Democrats, the Liberal Democratic Party, and the Socialist Party. Following a recalibration of the city's political forces, Jenő Maglai of the Alliance of Vojvodina Hungarians became mayor on 21 November 2013. The new parliamentary majority consisted of the Alliance of Vojvodina Hungarians, the Progressives, the Socialists, the Democratic Alliance of Croats in Vojvodina, and some smaller parties and independents.

===== Bačka Topola =====
Results of the election for the Municipal Assembly of Bačka Topola:

Party	Votes	%	Seats
Alliance of Vojvodina Hungarians	5,324	30.88	16
Democratic Party–Choice for a Better Bačka Topola–Dr. Ferenc Toth	2,326	13.49	7
League of Social Democrats of Vojvodina–Nenad Čanak	1,874	10.87	5
Let's Get Bačka Topola Moving–Tomislav Nikolić (Serbian Progressive Party, Strength of Serbia Movement)	1,531	8.88	4
United Pensioners and Social Rights–Milan Ćatić	1,242	7.20	3
Citizens' Group: Dr. Hadzsy János	1,148	6.66	3
Ivica Dačić–Socialist Party of Serbia (SPS), Party of United Pensioners of Serbia (PUPS), United Serbia (JS)	985	5.71	3
Čedomir Jovanović U-Turn–LDP, SPO–Svetlana Lalović	663	3.85	–
Democratic Party of Vojvodina Hungarians–András Ágoston	625	3.63	–
Renewal–For a Better Bačka Topola	562	3.26	–
Serb List for Bačka Topola (Democratic Party of Serbia (DSS)–New Serbia (NS))	508	2.95	–
Serbian Radical Party–Dr. Aleksandar Martinović	453	2.63	–
Total	17,241	100.00	41
Valid votes	17,242	95.86	
Invalid/blank votes	745	4.14	
Total votes	17,987	100.00	
Registered voters/turnout	31,072	57.89	

The local government was formed by the Alliance of Vojvodina Hungarians, the Democratic Party, and the Socialist Party. Melinda Kókai Mernyák of the Alliance of Vojvodina Hungarians was chosen as mayor. She was replaced by Gábor Kislinder, also of the Alliance of Vojvodina Hungarians, in 2014. By the time of this change, the Socialists had left the government and the Progressives had joined.

===== Mali Iđoš =====
Results of the election for the Municipal Assembly of Mali Iđoš:

Party	Votes	%	Seats
Alliance of Vojvodina Hungarians–István Pásztor–Csóré Róbert	1,616	25.93	8
Democratic Party–Boris Tadić	1,081	17.34	5
Ivica Dačić–Socialist Party of Serbia–Marko Rovčanin	686	11.01	3
Citizens' Group: Small Shareholders and Injured Workers, Farmers, and Citizens of the Municipality of Mali Iđoš–Bértok Lajos	629	10.09	3
Let's Get Mali Iđoš Moving–Tomislav Nikolić	606	9.72	2
Erzsébet Sinkovits–United Regions of Serbia–Sinkovits Erzsébet	466	7.48	2
United Serbia Dragan Marković Palma–Zlatko Popović	383	6.14	1
Montenegrin Party–Nenad Stevović	303	4.86	1
League of Social Democrats of Vojvodina–Nenad Čanak	195	3.13	–
Serb List for Mali Iđoš (SRS–DSS)–Radmila Bigović	174	2.79	–
National Association "Montenegro" Citizens' Group: Pejović Predrag	94	1.51	–
Total	6,233	100.00	25
Valid votes	6,233	95.98	
Invalid/blank votes	261	4.02	
Total votes	6,494	100.00	
Registered voters/turnout	10,688	60.76	

Erzsébet Celuska Frindik of the Democratic Party was chosen as mayor after the election. She was replaced by Marko Rovčanin of the Socialist Party in 2013.

==== North Banat District ====
Local elections were held in all six municipalities of the North Banat District. The Progressive Party's alliance won a narrow victory over the Democratic Party in Kikinda; the Democrats initially formed a local coalition government, but a shift in political alliances the following year saw the Progressives come to power. The Democratic Party won in Ada and Novi Kneževac, and the Alliance of Vojvodina Hungarians won in Čoka, Kanjiža, and Senta.

===== Kikinda =====
Results of the election for the Municipal Assembly of Kikinda:

Party	Votes	%	Seats
Let's Get Kikinda Moving–Tomislav Nikolić (Serbian Progressive Party, New Serbia, Movement of Socialists, Strength of Serbia Movement)	8,043	25.70	12
Democratic Party–Boris Tadić	6,839	21.85	11
League of Social Democrats of Vojvodina–Nenad Čanak	3,953	12.63	6
Ivica Dačić–Socialist Party of Serbia (SPS), United Serbia (JS), Social Democratic Party of Serbia (SDPS)	3,751	11.99	6
Democratic Party of Serbia–Vojislav Koštunica	1,669	5.33	2
Strength of Kikinda–Hook and Hoe–Branislav Bajić	1,597	5.10	–
Serbian Radical Party–Dr. Aleksandar Martinović	1,495	4.78	–
Alliance of Vojvodina Hungarians–István Pásztor	1,428	4.56	2
U-TURN Liberal Democratic Party, Serbian Renewal Movement, Vojvodina's Party–Paja Francuski	1,405	4.49	–
United Regions of Serbia–Karolj Damjanov	1,116	3.57	–
Total	31,296	100.00	39
Valid votes	31,296	95.34	
Invalid/blank votes	1,529	4.66	
Total votes	32,825	100.00	
Registered voters/turnout	53,101	61.82	

Savo Dobranić of the Democratic Party was chosen as mayor after the election; his deputy was a member of the Socialist Party. Pavle Markov of the Progressive Party succeeded Dobranić in September 2013, after a shift in the municipality's political alliances.

Milenko Jovanov was elected to the assembly from the lead position on the Democratic Party of Serbia's list.

===== Ada =====
Results of the election for the Municipal Assembly of Ada:

Party	Votes	%	Seats
Choice for a Better Life–Boris Tadić (Democratic Party, Social Democratic Party of Serbia)	4,526	50.40	16
Alliance of Vojvodina Hungarians–István Pásztor	1,767	19.68	6
Citizens' Group: "Ürményi Ferenc-Feco for a Successful Municipality–URS"	1,094	12.18	4
Let's Get Mol and Ada Moving–Tomislav Nikolić–Stanka Mihajlov (Serbian Progressive Party, Strength of Serbia Movement)	627	6.98	2
League of Social Democrats of Vojvodina–Nenad Čanak	329	3.66	–
Democratic Fellowship of Vojvodina Hungarians–Áron Csonka	288	3.21	1
Hungarian Civic Alliance–Tamás Sass	246	2.74	–
Hungarian Hope Movement–Bálint László	103	1.15	–
Total	8,980	100.00	29
Valid votes	8,980	96.87	
Invalid/blank votes	290	3.13	
Total votes	9,270	100.00	
Registered voters/turnout	16,252	57.04	

Incumbent mayor Zoltán Bilicki of the Democratic Party was confirmed for another term in office after the election. He left the party in early 2016.

József Tóbiás appeared in the second position on the Democratic Party's list and received a mandate.

===== Čoka =====
Results of the election for the Municipal Assembly of Čoka:

Party	Votes	%	Seats
Alliance of Vojvodina Hungarians–István Pásztor	1,829	30.05	9
Democratic Party–Boris Tadić	1,499	24.63	7
Let's Get Čoka Moving–Tomislav Nikolić (Serbian Progressive Party–Democratic Party of Serbia)	747	12.27	3
League of Social Democrats of Vojvodina–Nenad Čanak	601	9.87	3
Ivica Dačić–Socialist Party of Serbia (SPS), Party of United Pensioners of Serbia (PUPS)	591	9.71	3
Serbian Radical Party–Dr. Aleksandar Martinović	297	4.88	–
U-Turn–Liberal Democratic Party, Serbian Renewal Movement, Vojvodina's Party–Andrija Poljak, Dr. Vet. Med.	196	3.22	–
DZVM–GSM–József Cára	175	2.87	–
Hungarian Hope Movement–Zoltán Margit	152	2.50	–
Total	6,087	100.00	25
Valid votes	6,087	95.30	
Invalid/blank votes	300	4.70	
Total votes	6,387	100.00	
Registered voters/turnout	10,144	62.96	

Ferenc Balaž of the Alliance of Vojvodina Hungarians served as mayor after the election.

===== Kanjiža =====
Results of the election for the Municipal Assembly of Kanjiža:

Party	Votes	%	Seats
SVM–Together for the Municipality of Kanjiža–István Pásztor–Dr. Mihály Bimbó	4,172	32.59	11
Democratic Party–Boris Tadić	3,352	26.19	9
It's Time to Wake Up Frančik Jožef / Leko Lajoš (Civic Movement, Social Democratic Party of Serbia)	1,272	9.94	3
Chose the Way–Bacskulin István–Citizens' Group	1,249	9.76	3
League of Social Democrats of Vojvodina–Nenad Čanak	793	6.19	2
Let's Get Kanjiža Moving–Tomislav Nikolić (Serbian Progressive Party, New Serbia, Strength of Serbia Movement)	543	4.24	–
PUPS–Katalin (Lippai) Tunić	499	3.90	–
Hungarian Hope Movement–Bálint László	491	3.84	1
Liberal Democratic Party–Čedomir Jovanović	430	3.36	–
Total	12,801	100.00	29
Valid votes	12,801	95.74	
Invalid/blank votes	569	4.26	
Total votes	13,370	100.00	
Registered voters/turnout	22,918	58.34	

Incumbent mayor Mihály Nyilas of the Alliance of Vojvodina Hungarians was confirmed for another term in office after the election. He was succeeded on 10 July 2014 by fellow party member Mihály Bimbó.

===== Novi Kneževac =====
Results of the election for the Municipal Assembly of Novi Kneževac:

Party	Votes	%	Seats
Democratic Party–Boris Tadić	2,045	33.37	13
Let's Get Novi Kneževac Moving–Tomislav Nikolić Serbian Progressive Party	1,210	19.75	7
Alliance of Vojvodina Hungarians–István Pásztor	1,021	16.66	6
Ivica Dačić–Socialist Party of Serbia (SPS), Party of United Pensioners of Serbia (PUPS), United Serbia (JS)	577	9.42	3
League of Social Democrats of Vojvodina–Nenad Čanak	359	5.86	2
United Regions of Serbia–Katarina Nikolin	252	4.11	–
Serbian Radical Party–Dr. Aleksandar Martinović	230	3.75	–
Democratic Party of Serbia–Vojislav Koštunica	150	2.45	–
U-Turn–Liberal Democratic Party, Serbian Renewal Movement, Vojvodina's Party–Danica Knežević Popov	147	2.40	–
Citizens' Group: Bačikin Jovan	137	2.24	–
Total	6,128	100.00	31
Valid votes	6,128	95.18	
Invalid/blank votes	310	4.82	
Total votes	6,438	100.00	
Registered voters/turnout	9,802	65.68	

Incumbent mayor Dragan Babić of the Democratic Party was confirmed for another term in office after the election.

===== Senta =====
Results of the election for the Municipal Assembly of Senta:

Party	Votes	%	Seats
Alliance of Vojvodina Hungarians–István Pásztor	3,828	35.11	12
"Choice for a Better Life–Aniko Širkova" (Democratic Party, Social Democratic Party of Serbia)	3,089	28.33	10
United Regions of Serbia–Sándor József	1,098	10.07	3
Senta Belongs to Its People!–Hungarian Civic Alliance–László Rác Szabó	1,018	9.34	3
PUPS–SPS–Prim. Dr. Laslo Sloboda	562	5.15	1
League of Social Democrats of Vojvodina–Nenad Čanak	470	4.31	–
SNS Let's Get Senta Moving	366	3.36	–
Democratic Fellowship of Vojvodina Hungarians	252	2.31	–
Hungarian Hope Movement	220	2.02	–
Total	10,903	100.00	29
Valid votes	10,903	96.78	
Invalid/blank votes	363	3.22	
Total votes	11,266	100.00	
Registered voters/turnout	21,879	51.49	

Rudolf Czegledi of the Alliance of Vojvodina Hungarians was chosen as mayor after the election.

==== South Bačka District ====
Local elections were held in the one city (Novi Sad) and ten of the eleven separate municipalities of the South Bačka District. The exception was Vrbas, which was on a different four-year electoral cycle at the time.

The City of Novi Sad comprises two municipalities (the City municipality of Novi Sad and Petrovaradin), although their powers are very limited relative to the city government. Unlike Belgrade, Niš, and Vranje, Novi Sad does not have directly elected municipal assemblies.

Most of the local elections in South Bačka did not produce clear winners. The Democratic Party's lists technically won plurality victories in eight of the eleven jurisdictions that held elections, but they were only able to claim the mayoralties in Novi Sad (temporarily) and five other municipalities (including two where the party actually lost the popular vote). Progressive Party candidates won the mayoralties in three other municipalities, and candidates of the Socialist Party were chosen as mayor in Bačka Palanka and Srbobran.

===== Novi Sad =====
Results of the election for the City Assembly of Novi Sad:

Party	Votes	%	Seats
"Choice for a Better Novi Sad–Bojan Pajtić" (Democratic Party, Green Ecological Party – Greens)	31,024	18.70	18
Let's Get Novi Sad Moving–Tomislav Nikolić (Serbian Progressive Party, New Serbia, Movement of Socialists)	27,280	16.44	15
"League of Social Democrats of Vojvodina–Novi Sad Our Home–Nenad Čanak"	26,751	16.12	15
"Ivica Dačić–Socialist Party of Serbia (SPS), Party of United Pensioners of Serbia (PUPS), United Serbia (JS), Social Democratic Party of Serbia (SDPS)"	13,422	8.09	7
Roma Democratic Party–Tomislav Bokan	10,500	6.33	6
Democratic Party of Serbia–Vojislav Koštunica	9,777	5.89	5
"Dveri For the Life of Novi Sad"	8,906	5.37	5
Serbian Radical Party Dr. Aleksandar Martinović	8,788	5.30	5
Maja Gojković–United Regions of Serbia (G17 Plus, People's Party)	7,859	4.74	–
"Citizens' Group: United Pensioners and Social Justice–Pero Zubac"	7,038	4.24	–
Čedomir Jovanović–Vojvodina U-Turn (Liberal Democratic Party, VP, Social Democratic Union)	5,930	3.57	–
Alliance of Vojvodina Hungarians–István Pásztor	2,957	1.78	1
MI–Dr. Miroslav Miša Ilić	2,235	1.35	–
None of the Above	1,783	1.07	1
Serb Democratic Party–Magistar Radivoj Prodanović	1,686	1.02	–
Total	165,936	100.00	78
Valid votes	165,936	95.72	
Invalid/blank votes	7,412	4.28	
Total votes	173,348	100.00	
Registered voters/turnout	312,742	55.43	

Incumbent mayor Igor Pavličić of the Democratic Party was confirmed for another term in office after the election. He lost his majority later in the year, and Miloš Vučević of the Serbian Progressive Party became mayor on 14 September 2012. The local coalition government (after Vučević became mayor) consisted of the Progressives, the Democratic Party of Serbia, Dveri, the Roma Democratic Party, the Serbian Renewal Movement, and the Socialist Party of Serbia. Milorad Mirčić, who served as the city's mayor in the 1990s, was re-elected to the assembly on the Radical Party list.

===== Bač =====
Results of the election for the Municipal Assembly of Bač:

Party	Votes	%	Seats
Democratic Party–Tomislav Bogunović	2,389	30.36	9
Let's Get Bač Moving–Tomislav Nikolić Serbian Progressive Party	1,552	19.73	6
"Ivica Dačić–Socialist Party of Serbia (SPS), Party of United Pensioners of Serbia (PUPS)" Dr. Milenko Babić	1,379	17.53	5
League of Social Democrats of Vojvodina–Nenad Čanak	763	9.70	3
Serbian Radical Party–Dr. Aleksandar Martinović	713	9.06	2
Democratic Party of Serbia–Vojislav Koštunica	356	4.52	–
Čedomir Jovanović–U-Turn–LDP, SDU	278	3.53	–
Social Democratic Party of Serbia–Rasim Ljajić	254	3.23	–
Alliance of Vojvodina Hungarians–István Pásztor	184	2.34	–
Total	7,868	100.00	25
Valid votes	7,868	95.93	
Invalid/blank votes	334	4.07	
Total votes	8,202	100.00	
Registered voters/turnout	13,361	61.39	

Mirko Pušara of the Progressive Party was chosen as mayor after the election. The government was formed by the Progressives and the Socialists; an individual delegate from the LSV and a delegate from the Radical Party also voted to approve the government. In December 2012, a new administration was formed by the Democratic Party in alliance with the League of Social Democrats of Vojvodina and the Radical Party. Ognjen Marković of the Democratic Party was chosen as mayor; Pušara initially refused to stand down, claiming the change in government was illegal.

Another change in administration took place in April 2014, with the Progressives returning to office in alliance with the Socialists and the League of Social Democrats. Dragan Stašević of the Progressive Party was chosen as mayor.

===== Bačka Palanka =====
Results of the election for the Municipal Assembly of Bačka Palanka:

Party	Votes	%	Seats
Democratic Party–Aleksandar Saša Borković	5,024	17.73	9
Let's Get Bačka Palanka Moving–Tomislav Nikolić (Serbian Progressive Party Movement of Socialists)	4,718	16.65	9
Ivica Dačić–Socialist Party of Serbia (SPS)–Party of United Pensioners of Serbia (PUPS)–Social Democratic Party of Serbia (SDPS)	4,690	16.55	8
Serbian Radical Party–Dr. Aleksandar Martinović	4,008	14.14	7
Democratic Party of Serbia–Vojislav Koštunica	2,264	7.99	4
"Dveri–For the Life of Bačka Palanka"	1,509	5.32	2
Party of Vojvodina Slovaks–Viliam Slavka	1,342	4.74	2
League of Social Democrats of Vojvodina–Nenad Čanak	1,159	4.09	–
Serbian Renewal Movement "Coalition for the People"–Stevo Karanović	1,029	3.63	–
Čedomir Jovanović–Vojvodina U-Turn (Liberal Democratic Party, Vojvodina's Party)	903	3.19	–
United Serbia Dragan Marković Palma	654	2.31	–
Alliance of Vojvodina Hungarians–István Pásztor–Vladimir Bodor	554	1.95	1
United Regions of Serbia–Jovan Petrović (G17 Plus, People's Party)	486	1.71	–
Total	28,340	100.00	42
Valid votes	28,340	96.90	
Invalid/blank votes	908	3.10	
Total votes	29,248	100.00	
Registered voters/turnout	48,697	60.06	

Bojan Radman of the Socialist Party was chosen as mayor after the election. Aleksandar Đedovac of the Progressive Party was chosen as deputy mayor. In 2013, Radman and Đedovac rotated positions. The local governing coalition consisted of delegates of the Progressives, the Socialists, the Democratic Party of Serbia, Dveri, and the Alliance of Vojvodina Hungarians.

===== Bački Petrovac =====
Results of the election for the Municipal Assembly of Bački Petrovac:

Party	Votes	%	Seats
"Choice for a Better Life–Boris Tadić" (Democratic Party)	1,836	27.61	10
"League of Social Democrats of Vojvodina–Nenad Čanak"	1,068	16.06	5
"Čedomir Jovanović–U-Turn (LDP–Vojvodina's Party)"	635	9.55	3
"Socialist Party of Serbia–Ivica Dačić"	625	9.40	3
"United Regions of Serbia–For an Environment Worth Living In–Dr. Jan Sabo" (G17 Plus)	610	9.17	3
"Serbian Progressive Party–Tomislav Nikolić"	537	8.08	3
"United Serbia–Miroslav Čeman"	417	6.27	2
"Party of Vojvodina Slovaks"	407	6.12	2
"Serbian Radical Party Dr. Aleksandar Martinović"	210	3.16	–
Citizens' Group: Citizens' Initiative "People to People"	192	2.89	–
"Social Democratic Party of Serbia–Rasim Ljajić"	112	1.68	–
Total	6,649	100.00	31
Valid votes	6,649	96.08	
Invalid/blank votes	271	3.92	
Total votes	6,920	100.00	
Registered voters/turnout	12,435	55.65	

Pavel Marčok of the Democratic Party was chosen as mayor after the election.

===== Bečej =====
Results of the election for the Municipal Assembly of Bečej:

Party	Votes	%	Seats
"Choice for a Better Life–Boris Tadić" (Democratic Party, Social Democratic Party of Serbia)	4,460	24.24	11
"Miša Vrebalov–U-Turn for Bečej" (Liberal Democratic Party, Serbian Renewal Movement)	3,216	17.48	8
Let's Get Bečej Moving–Tomislav Nikolić (Serbian Progressive Party, New Serbia)	3,166	17.20	8
Alliance of Vojvodina Hungarians–István Pásztor	3,049	16.57	8
Ivica Dačić–Socialist Party of Serbia	890	4.84	–
PUPS–DSS for Bečej	739	4.02	–
Serbian Radical Party–Dr. Aleksandar Martinović	632	3.43	–
League of Social Democrats of Vojvodina–Nenad Čanak	626	3.40	–
Democratic Party of Vojvodina Hungarians	467	2.54	1
Hungarian Hope Movement	345	1.87	–
United Regions of Serbia–Miodrag Jovićević Čačak (G17 Plus, People's Party)	320	1.74	–
Democratic Fellowship of Vojvodina Hungarians	302	1.64	–
For All of Us–Hungarian Civic Alliance–Čila Mešter-Kuti	191	1.04	–
Total	18,403	100.00	36
Valid votes	18,403	96.21	
Invalid/blank votes	724	3.79	
Total votes	19,127	100.00	
Registered voters/turnout	34,181	55.96	

Vuk Radojević of the Progressive Party was chosen as mayor after the election.

===== Beočin =====
Results of the election for the Municipal Assembly of Beočin:

Party	Votes	%	Seats
Democratic Party–Boris Tadić	2,151	24.37	9
United Regions of Serbia Beočin–Milan Čačić (G17 Plus)	1,033	11.70	4
Let's Get Beočin Moving–Tomislav Nikolić (Serbian Progressive Party, Strength of Serbia Movement)	1,009	11.43	4
"Ivica Dačić–Socialist Party of Serbia (SPS)"	978	11.08	4
Democratic Party of Serbia	765	8.67	3
League of Social Democrats of Vojvodina–Nenad Čanak	691	7.83	3
Roma Democratic Party–Asan Murina (Cana)	511	5.79	2
Domaćinski–JS PUPS–SDPS	415	4.70	–
Serbian Radical Party–Dr. Aleksandar Martinović	403	4.57	–
Citizens Group: For the Municipality of Beočin Goran Kalabić	362	4.10	–
Serb Democratic Party–Mr. Milorad Jovičić	279	3.16	–
United Roma Party–Amela Demiri	166	1.88	–
People's Party–Maja Gojković	63	0.71	–
Total	8,826	100.00	29
Valid votes	8,826	95.27	
Invalid/blank votes	438	4.73	
Total votes	9,264	100.00	
Registered voters/turnout	13,439	68.93	

Incumbent mayor Bogdan Cvejić of the Democratic Party was confirmed for another term in office after the election.

===== Srbobran =====
Results of the election for the Municipal Assembly of Srbobran:

Party	Votes	%	Seats
"Branko Gajin–DS"	2,277	27.25	9
"Ivica Dačić–Socialist Party of Serbia (SPS), Party of United Pensioners of Serbia (PUPS)"	1,678	20.08	7
Citizens Group: Movement for Change–Dr. Ilija Gazepov	1,391	16.65	6
Let's Get Srbobran Moving–Tomislav Nikolić (Serbian Progressive Party, New Serbia)	1,076	12.88	4
League of Social Democrats of Vojvodina–Nenad Čanak	474	5.67	2
Serbian Radical Party–Dr. Aleksandar Martinović	403	4.82	–
Alliance of Vojvodina Hungarians–István Pásztor	400	4.79	–
Maja Gojković–United Regions of Serbia (G17 Plus, People's Party)	273	3.27	–
United Serbia–Social Democratic Party of Serbia	158	1.89	–
Hungarian Hope Movement–Eržebet Gazdik	140	1.68	–
"Srbobran Hungarian U-Turn"–Jankovič Žolt (Democratic Fellowship of Vojvodina Hungarians, Democratic Party of Vojvodina Hungarians)	86	1.03	–
Total	8,356	100.00	28
Valid votes	8,356	96.85	
Invalid/blank votes	272	3.15	
Total votes	8,628	100.00	
Registered voters/turnout	14,146	60.99	

Zoran Mladenović of the Socialist Party was chosen as mayor after the election. The local governing coalition consisted of the Socialists, the Movement for Change list, and the LSV.

===== Sremski Karlovci =====
Results of the election for the Municipal Assembly of Sremski Karlovci:

Party	Votes	%	Seats
Democratic Party–Milenko Filipović	1,203	25.51	8
Let's Get Sremski Karlovci Moving–Tomislav Nikolić (Serbian Progressive Party, New Serbia, Strength of Serbia Movement)	784	16.63	5
United Regions of Serbia–Jadranka Beljan Balaban (G17 Plus, People's Party)	520	11.03	3
Citizens' Group: "Dveri–For the Life of Sremski Karlovci"	380	8.06	2
League of Social Democrats of Vojvodina–Nenad Čanak	369	7.83	2
"Ivica Dačić"–Socialist Party of Serbia (SPS), Social Democratic Party of Serbia (SDPS)	332	7.04	2
Serbian Radical Party–Dr. Aleksandar Martinović	332	7.04	2
Democratic Party of Serbia–Vojislav Koštunica	277	5.87	1
Party of United Pensioners of Serbia (PUPS), United Serbia (JS) Sremski Karlovci	211	4.48	–
"U-Turn" Čedomir Jovanović–U-Turn Liberal Democratic Party SPO	204	4.33	–
Greens of Serbia–Green Sremski Karlovci	103	2.18	–
Total	4,715	100.00	25
Valid votes	4,715	96.66	
Invalid/blank votes	163	3.34	
Total votes	4,878	100.00	
Registered voters/turnout	8,441	57.79	

Incumbent mayor Milenko Filipović of the Democratic Party was confirmed for another term in office after the election. The governing coalition consisted of the Democratic Party, the Socialist Party, and the League of Social Democrats of Vojvodina. The United Regions of Serbia later joined the government, and the Progressive Party joined in October 2013.

===== Temerin =====
Results of the election for the Municipal Assembly of Temerin:

Party	Votes	%	Seats
Let's Get Temerin Moving–Tomislav Nikolić (Serbian Progressive Party, Movement of Socialists)	2,280	15.09	5
Democratic Party–Boris Tadić	1,961	12.98	5
Serbian Radical Party–Dr. Aleksandar Martinović	1,583	10.48	4
Ivica Dačić–Socialist Party of Serbia (SPS), Party of United Pensioners of Serbia (PUPS)	1,343	8.89	3
League of Social Democrats of Vojvodina–Nenad Čanak	1,233	8.16	3
Democratic Party of Vojvodina Hungarians–Čorba Bela	1,198	7.93	3
DSS, New Serbia–Vojislav Koštunica	1,189	7.87	3
Alliance of Vojvodina Hungarians–István Pásztor	1,162	7.69	3
Citizens' Group: For the Prosperity of the Municipality of Temerin	1,013	6.71	2
"U-Turn" (Liberal Democratic Party, Serbian Renewal Movement)	852	5.64	2
United Serbia–Social Democratic Party of Serbia	653	4.32	–
United Regions of Serbia–Ivan Todorović (G17 Plus, People's Party)	498	3.30	–
Serb Democratic Party–Dragan Miletić	143	0.95	–
Total	15,108	100.00	33
Valid votes	15,108	96.48	
Invalid/blank votes	551	3.52	
Total votes	15,659	100.00	
Registered voters/turnout	24,577	63.71	

The municipal government of Temerin changed several times between 2012 and 2016.

Vladislav Capik of the Democratic Party was chosen as mayor after the election. The government consisted of the Democratic Party, the Socialist Party and United Pensioners, the Democratic Party of Vojvodina Hungarians, the Democratic Party of Serbia–New Serbia alliance, the Alliance of Vojvodina Hungarians, and the "For the Prosperity of the Municipality of Temerin" group.

On 12 March 2014, a new administration was formed with Gustonj Andraš of the Democratic Party of Vojvodina Hungarians as mayor. The new administration included the Democratic Party of Vojvodina Hungarians, the Socialist Party and United Pensioners, the Democratic Party of Serbia–New Serbia alliance, the Liberal Democratic Party, and the Democratic Party. The Radicals were not part of the governing coalition but provided support on a motion of confidence.

Following another political realignment, Đuro Žiga of the Progressive Party became mayor in October 2014. The new governing coalition included the Progressives and Socialist Movement, the Socialist Party and United Pensioners, the Serbian Renewal Movement, and two groups of independent representatives.

Future parliamentarian Rozália Ökrész was elected as the lead candidate on the Alliance of Vojvodina Hungarians list.

===== Titel =====
Results of the election for the Municipal Assembly of Titel:

Party	Votes	%	Seats
Let's Get Titel Moving–Tomislav Nikolić (Serbian Progressive Party, New Serbia)	3,308	35.81	11
Choice for a Better Life–Boris Tadić (Democratic Party, Green Ecological Party – Greens)	1,754	18.99	6
United Regions of Serbia–Dejan Kulja (People's Party)	1,397	15.12	4
"Ivica Dačić"–Socialist Party of Serbia (SPS)–Party of United Pensioners of Serbia (PUPS)	728	7.88	2
Serbian Radical Party–Dr. Aleksandar Martinović	641	6.94	2
League of Social Democrats of Vojvodina–Nenad Čanak	363	3.93	–
Movement of Socialists–Vladimir Soro	358	3.88	–
Democratic Party of Serbia–Vojislav Koštunica	310	3.36	–
Citizens' Group: Stevan Marjanov-Pesak, With All Our Hearts for the Municipality of Titel	260	2.81	–
United Serbia–Dragan Marković Palma	119	1.29	–
Total	9,238	100.00	25
Valid votes	9,238	96.60	
Invalid/blank votes	325	3.40	
Total votes	9,563	100.00	
Registered voters/turnout	13,039	73.34	

Dragan Božić of the Progressive Party was chosen as mayor following the election. In 2014, the Democratic Party formed a new assembly majority with the United Regions of Serbia and the Socialist Party (also supported by individual members of other parties), and Milan Nastasić became the municipality's new mayor. Božić returned to office in December 2014 via an alliance of the Progressives and Radicals, also supported by the Socialists.

===== Vrbas =====
There was no election for the Municipal Assembly of Vrbas in 2012. The previous election had taken place in 2009, and the next election took place in 2013.

===== Žabalj =====
Results of the election for the Municipal Assembly of Žabalj:

Party	Votes	%	Seats
Let's Get Žabalj Moving–Tomislav Nikolić (Serbian Progressive Party, New Serbia)	2,543	21.87	8
"Choice for a Better Life–Boris Tadić" (Democratic Party)	2,214	19.04	7
League of Social Democrats of Vojvodina–Nenad Čanak	1,678	14.43	5
"Ivica Dačić–Socialist Party of Serbia (SPS), Party of United Pensioners of Serbia (PUPS), United Serbia (JS)"	1,489	12.81	5
Serbian Radical Party–Dr. Aleksandar Martinović	885	7.61	2
Rich Serbia—Zaharije Trnavčević	824	7.09	2
Democratic Party of Serbia–Miodrag Janjoš	637	5.48	2
Dveri for the Life of Žabalj	572	4.92	–
SPO–Family First–Vasa Zlokolica	511	4.39	–
United Regions of Serbia–Milorad Kragulj	275	2.36	–
Total	11,628	100.00	31
Valid votes	11,628	95.12	
Invalid/blank votes	597	4.88	
Total votes	12,225	100.00	
Registered voters/turnout	22,192	55.09	

Čedomir Božić of the Democratic Party was chosen as mayor after the election. The Democrats originally governed in an alliance that included the Socialist Party of Serbia.

==== South Banat District ====
Local elections were held in the two cities (Pančevo and Vršac) and five of the six other municipalities of the South Banat District. The exception was Kovin, where the previous election had been held in 2009 and the next election was held in 2013.

The Democratic Party won a narrow victory in Pančevo but fell well short of a majority and ultimately served in opposition. The Serbian Progressive Party and the Socialist Party of Serbia formed a coalition government, and a representative of the Socialists was initially chosen as mayor. The Democratic Party won and formed government in four of the other six jurisdictions that held elections. Independent lists won and formed government in Vršac and Opovo; in the latter case, the list was aligned with the Democratic Party.

By the time of the 2016 elections, the Progressive Party had come to power in all jurisdictions in South Banat except for Plandište.

===== Pančevo =====
Results of the election for the City Assembly of Pančevo:

Party	Votes	%	Seats
Democratic Party–Vesna Martinović	12,863	22.59	19
Let's Get Pančevo Moving–Tomislav Nikolić (Serbian Progressive Party, New Serbia, Strength of Serbia Movement, Democratic Party of Macedonians)	12,421	21.81	18
"Ivica Dačić–Socialist Party of Serbia (SPS), Party of United Pensioners of Serbia (PUPS), United Serbia (JS), Social Democratic Party of Serbia (SDP Serbia)"	8,508	14.94	12
Democratic Party of Serbia–Vojislav Koštunica	4,117	7.23	6
"Saśa Pavlov–United for Pančevo–United Regions of Serbia" (G17 Plus, People's Party)	4,015	7.05	5
League of Social Democrats of Vojvodina–Nenad Čanak	3,933	6.91	5
Čedomir Jovanović–U-Turn–Predrag Patić (Liberal Democratic Party and Serbian Renewal Movement)	3,664	6.43	5
Serbian Radical Party Dr. Aleksandar Martinović	2,732	4.80	–
Citizens' Group: "Dveri Pančevo"–Violeta Blaga	2,475	4.35	–
Citizens' Group: Let's Improve the Town and Village	1,147	2.01	–
Alliance of Vojvodina Hungarians–István Pásztor	671	1.18	–
Movement for the Development of Serbia–Mr. Mile Dragić	396	0.70	–
Total	56,942	100.00	70
Valid votes	56,942	94.33	
Invalid/blank votes	3,423	5.67	
Total votes	60,365	100.00	
Registered voters/turnout	113,623	53.13	

Svetozar Gavrilović of the Socialist Party of Serbia was chosen as mayor after the election, leading a government that included the Progressive and Socialist alliances, the Democratic Party of Serbia, and the United Regions of Serbia. He resigned in May 2013, citing health issues, and was replaced by Pavle Radanov of the Serbian Progressive Party. Radanov in turn resigned in June 2015 and was replaced by Saša Pavlov, who had been elected on the list of the United Regions of Serbia but was by this time a member of the Progressive Party.

Marinika Tepić was elected to the city assembly from the lead position on the League of Social Democrats of Vojvodina list. She resigned on 16 July 2012 after being appointed to the provincial executive.

===== Alibunar =====
Results of the election for the Municipal Assembly of Alibunar:

Party	Votes	%	Seats
Democratic Party–Dr. Boris Tadić	4,477	40.92	12
Ivica Dačić–Socialist Party of Serbia (SPS)	1,742	15.92	4
Let's Get the Municipality of Alibunar Moving–Tomislav Nikolić Serbian Progressive Party	1,417	12.95	3
League of Social Democrats of Vojvodina–Nenad Čanak	933	8.53	2
"Democratic Party of Serbia Vojislav Koštunica"–Zlatan Vujnović	858	7.84	2
"Čedomir Jovanović–U-Turn"–Dr. Nikolaje Marina (Liberal Democratic Party, Serbian Renewal Movement)	521	4.76	–
Serbian Radical Party–Dr. Aleksandar Martinović	376	3.44	–
United Regions of Serbia–Mlađan Dinkić	338	3.09	–
"Social Democratic Party of Serbia–Rasim Ljajić"	278	2.54	–
Total	10,940	100.00	23
Valid votes	10,940	95.92	
Invalid/blank votes	465	4.08	
Total votes	11,405	100.00	
Registered voters/turnout	19,085	59.76	

Incumbent mayor Dušan Jovanović of the Democratic Party was chosen as mayor after the election. He was replaced by Đurica Gligorijev of the same party in June 2014. The Serbian Progressive Party and the Socialist Party of Serbia took over the local government in June 2015, and Predrag Belić of the Progressives was chosen as mayor.

===== Bela Crkva =====
Results of the election for the Municipal Assembly of Bela Crkva:

Party	Votes	%	Seats
Democratic Party–Dr. Boris Tadić	1,900	19.67	8
"United Serbia"–Dragan Marković Palma	1,882	19.48	8
Let's Get Bela Crkva Moving–Tomislav Nikolić (Serbian Progressive Party)	1,065	11.02	4
Rich Serbia Movement of Farmers and Businessmen–Dragan Tikić	1,013	10.49	4
League of Social Democrats of Vojvodina–Nenad Čanak	838	8.67	3
Ivica Dačić–Socialist Party of Serbia (SPS), Social Democratic Party of Serbia (SDP Serbia)	640	6.63	2
United Regions of Serbia–Boris Đurđev	564	5.84	2
For a Better Future DSS and the Economic Council of the Municipality of Bela Crkva	562	5.82	2
Movement of the Vršac Region–European Region for Bela Crkva–Veroljub Rusovan	377	3.90	–
Lovci Siga–Aksić Bogdan	191	1.98	–
"Čedomir Jovanović–U-Turn" (Liberal Democratic Party, Serbian Renewal Movement)	179	1.85	–
Serbian Radical Party–Dr. Aleksandar Martinović	166	1.72	–
Communist Party–Josip Broz	115	1.19	–
New Serbia–Movement of Socialists	93	0.96	–
Movement of Workers and Peasants–Ilija Popović Cota	75	0.78	–
Total	9,660	100.00	33
Valid votes	9,660	95.04	
Invalid/blank votes	504	4.96	
Total votes	10,164	100.00	
Registered voters/turnout	16,565	61.36	

Stanko Petrović of the Democratic Party was chosen as mayor after the election. He was succeeded by Darko Bogosavljević of the Serbian Progressive Party following a change in government in January 2016.

===== Kovačica =====
Results of the election for the Municipal Assembly of Kovačica:

Party	Votes	%	Seats
Democratic Party–Dr. Boris Tadić	4,092	34.51	16
Let's Get Kovačica Moving–Tomislav Nikolić (Serbian Progressive Party, New Serbia)	1,911	16.12	7
"Čedomir Jovanović–U-Turn" (LDP–SDU)	1,029	8.68	4
Citizens' Group: Green Apple	948	8.00	3
League of Social Democrats of Vojvodina–Nenad Čanak	847	7.14	3
All Together Against the Construction of an Asbestos Processing Factory–Slovak Party Jan Paul	772	6.51	3
"Ivica Dačić"–Socialist Party of Serbia (SPS), Party of United Pensioners of Serbia (PUPS)	633	5.34	2
Citizens' Group: Ordinary People	582	4.91	–
Serbian Radical Party Dr. Aleksandar Martinović	496	4.18	–
Alliance of Vojvodina Hungarians	391	3.30	1
Party of Vojvodina Slovaks–Slovak Community	156	1.32	–
Total	11,857	100.00	39
Valid votes	11,857	95.82	
Invalid/blank votes	517	4.18	
Total votes	12,374	100.00	
Registered voters/turnout	22,597	54.76	

Incumbent mayor Miroslav Krišan of the Democratic Party was confirmed for another term in office after the election. There was a change in government in October 2015, and he was succeeded by Jan Husarik of the Serbian Progressive Party.

===== Kovin =====
There was no municipal election in Kovin in 2012. The previous election had taken place in 2009, and the next election took place in 2013.

===== Opovo =====
Results of the election for the Municipal Assembly of Opovo:

Party	Votes	%	Seats
Citizens' Group: Milorad Soldatović–For a Better Opovo (Democratic Party, Social Democratic Party of Serbia)	1,647	30.99	10
Citizens' Groups (two different lists)	932	17.54	4
Serbian Progressive Party	885	16.65	5
Socialist Party of Serbia–Party of United Pensioners of Serbia–United Serbia	510	9.60	3
League of Social Democrats of Vojvodina–Nenad Čanak	334	6.29	2
Democratic Party of Serbia	286	5.38	1
Citizens' Group: Dveri Opovo	245	4.61	–
Roma Union of Serbia	147	2.77	–
Serbian Radical Party	119	2.24	–
Movement of Socialists	110	2.07	–
New Serbia	99	1.86	–
Total	5,314	100.00	25
Valid votes	5,314	96.34	
Invalid/blank votes	202	3.66	
Total votes	5,516	100.00	
Registered voters/turnout	8,602	64.12	

Former mayor Milorad Soldatović, an independent aligned with the Democratic Party and the Social Democratic Party of Serbia, was confirmed for another term in office after the election. He resigned in September 2015 and was replaced by Miloš Markov of the Serbian Progressive Party.

===== Plandište =====
Results of the election for the Municipal Assembly of Plandište:

Party	Votes	%	Seats
Democratic Party–Boris Tadić	1,692	27.76	8
Zoran Vorkapić–United Regions of Serbia	1,567	25.71	7
Ivica Dačić–Socialist Party of Serbia (SPS), Party of United Pensioners of Serbia (PUPS), United Serbia (JS), Social Democratic Party of Serbia (SDP Serbia)	634	10.40	3
League of Social Democrats of Vojvodina–Nenad Čanak	595	9.76	2
Let's Get Plandište Moving–Tomislav Nikolić (Serbian Progressive Party)	483	7.92	2
Čedomir Jovanović–U-Turn (Liberal Democratic Party, Social Democratic Union)	333	5.46	1
Lawyer Lukić Danilo–Democratic Party of Serbia	268	4.40	–
Citizens' Group: Youth Is the Foundation of Renewal–Nikola Borojević	211	3.46	–
Serbian Radical Party Dr. Aleksandar Martinović	171	2.81	–
Movement for the Municipality of Plandište–Prof. Mile Spirovski: DPM	142	2.33	–
Total	6,096	100.00	23
Valid votes	6,096	95.61	
Invalid/blank votes	280	4.39	
Total votes	6,376	100.00	
Registered voters/turnout	9,794	65.10	

Milan Selaković of the Democratic Party was chosen as mayor after the election.

===== Vršac =====
Results of the election for the City Assembly of Vršac:

Party	Votes	%	Seats
Citizens' Group: "Movement of the Vršac Region–European Region"–Čedomir Živković	6,990	28.05	15
Ivica Dačić–Socialist Party of Serbia (SPS), Party of United Pensioners of Serbia (PUPS), United Serbia (JS), Social Democratic Party of Serbia (SDP Serbia)	4,066	16.32	9
Choice for a Better Life–Boris Tadić (Democratic Party)	3,774	15.15	8
Let's Get Vršac Moving–Tomislav Nikolić (Serbian Progressive Party, New Serbia, Movement of Socialists, Strength of Serbia Movement)	3,378	13.56	7
Citizens' Group: For a Better Vršac	1,749	7.02	3
League of Social Democrats of Vojvodina–Nenad Čanak	1,451	5.82	3
Čedomir Jovanović–U-Turn (Liberal Democratic Party, Serbian Renewal Movement, Vojvodina's Party, Rich Serbia)	1,166	4.68	–
Dveri–For the Life of Vršac	1,003	4.03	–
Serbian Radical Party–Dr. Aleksandar Martinović	899	3.61	–
Romanians–Alliance of Vojvodina Romanians	440	1.77	–
Total	24,916	100.00	45
Valid votes	24,916	94.60	
Invalid/blank votes	1,423	5.40	
Total votes	26,339	100.00	
Registered voters/turnout	46,882	56.18	

Incumbent mayor Čedomir Živković of Movement of the Vršac Region–European Region was confirmed for another term in office after the election. In 2015, he joined the Serbian Progressive Party.

==== Srem District ====
Local elections were held in the one city (Sremska Mitrovica) and the other six municipalities of the Srem District. The Democratic Party won every municipality except Stara Pazova, which was won by the Serbian Progressive Party.

Incumbent mayor Branislav Nedimović led an independent list to a second-place finish in Sremska Mitrovica and formed a new governing coalition after the election. The Democratic Party was initially able to form coalition governments in the other five municipalities that it won. The Progressives formed government in Stara Pazova.

Shifting political alliances subsequently brought the Serbian Progressive Party to power in every municipality except Inđija by 2016.

===== Sremska Mitrovica =====
Results of the election for the City Assembly of Sremska Mitrovica:

Party	Votes	%	Seats
Democratic Party–Boris Tadić	10,761	24.06	18
Citizens' Group: Branislav Nedimović–Valuable Mitrovica	8,576	19.17	15
Let's Get Sremska Mitrovica Moving–Tomislav Nikolić (Serbian Progressive Party, New Serbia, Movement of Socialists, Strength of Serbia Movement, Movement for the Development of Serbia) Dr. Živko Vrcelj	7,048	15.76	12
Democratic Party of Serbia	5,602	12.52	9
Ivica Dačić–"Socialist Party of Serbia (SPS), Party of United Pensioners of Serbia (PUPS), United Serbia (JS)"–Dr. Milan Latković	4,080	9.12	7
League of Social Democrats of Vojvodina–Nenad Čanak	2,257	5.05	–
Serbian Radical Party–Dr. Aleksandar Martinović	2,015	4.50	–
Čedomir Jovanović–U-Turn (LDP–SPO)	1,630	3.64	–
Citizens' Group: Dveri Sremska Mitrovica	1,553	3.47	–
Dr. Boško Laćarac–United Regions of Serbia–Laćaračka Initiative–For a Strong Mitrovica	1,208	2.70	–
Total	44,730	100.00	61
Valid votes	44,730	96.22	
Invalid/blank votes	1,756	3.78	
Total votes	46,486	100.00	
Registered voters/turnout	70,569	65.87	

Incumbent mayor Branislav Nedimović was confirmed for another term in office after the election with the support of forty-three of the sixty delegates who were present. Nedimović joined the Serbian Progressive Party in 2015.

===== Inđija =====
Results of the election for the Municipal Assembly of Inđija:

Party	Votes	%	Seats
Goran Ješić, List Holder–Goran Ješić (Democratic Party, G17 Plus)	9,911	40.10	17
Let's Get Inđija Moving–Tomislav Nikolić (Serbian Progressive Party, New Serbia, PUPS)	3,625	14.67	6
Ivica Dačić Socialist Party of Serbia (SPS)–Social Democratic Party of Serbia (SDP)	3,241	13.11	5
Serbian Radical Party–Dr. Aleksandar Martinović	2,259	9.14	4
Democratic Party of Serbia–Vojislav Koštunica–Srpko Medenica	1,828	7.40	3
League of Social Democrats of Vojvodina–Nenad Čanak	1,361	5.51	2
Citizens' Group: Changes–Movement for Inđija and Progressive Villages–Marijan Rističević	772	3.12	–
Citizens' Group: Dveri Inđija, List Holder Jelena Kosanović	645	2.61	–
Citizens' Group: It Could Be Better–Slavko Popović	628	2.54	–
Serb Democratic Party–Milan Predojević	444	1.80	–
Total	24,714	100.00	37
Valid votes	24,714	96.69	
Invalid/blank votes	847	3.31	
Total votes	25,561	100.00	
Registered voters/turnout	41,847	61.08	

Incumbent mayor Goran Ješić of the Democratic Party was confirmed for a new term in office after the election. He resigned in August 2012 after being appointed to the government of Vojvodina and was replaced by Petar Filipović of the same party.

===== Irig =====
Results of the election for the Municipal Assembly of Irig:

Party	Votes	%	Seats
"Democratic Party–Prof. Dr. Ilija Ćosić"	1,445	25.00	6
Let's Get Irig Moving–Tomislav Nikolić (Serbian Progressive Party, Party of United Pensioners of Serbia PUPS)	1,255	21.72	5
Ivica Dačić–"Socialist Party of Serbia (SPS)–United Serbia (JS)"	780	13.50	3
League of Social Democrats of Vojvodina–Nenad Čanak	717	12.41	3
Serbian Radical Party–Dr. Aleksandar Martinović	400	6.92	1
U-Turn for the Municipality of Irig (Liberal Democratic Party, Serbian Renewal Movement)	378	6.54	1
United Regions of Serbia–Mlađan Dinkić	306	5.30	1
Citizens' Movement	281	4.86	–
Greens of Serbia–Movement for Irig	217	3.75	–
Total	5,779	100.00	20
Valid votes	5,779	95.38	
Invalid/blank votes	280	4.62	
Total votes	6,059	100.00	
Registered voters/turnout	9,608	63.06	

Incumbent mayor Vladimir Petrović of the Democratic Party was confirmed for another term in office after the election. He was replaced by Stevan Kazimirović of the Serbian Progressive Party in January 2015, when the Progressives formed a new government with the League of Social Democrats of Vojvodina.

===== Pećinci =====
Results of the election for the Municipal Assembly of Pećinci:

Party	Votes	%	Seats
Coalition: DS–PUPS–LDP–Bata Marković	3,303	28.95	11
Citizens' Group: Luki	1,999	17.52	6
Let's Get Pećinci Moving–Tomislav Nikolić (Serbian Progressive Party, New Serbia)	1,434	12.57	4
United Regions of Serbia–Sava Čojčić	1,212	10.62	4
Coalition: United for Our Village" Milan Stepanović "For Our Village–United Serbia	871	7.63	3
Ivica Dačić–"Socialist Party of Serbia (SPS)–United Serbia (JS)"	786	6.89	2
Serbian Radical Party–Dr. Aleksandar Martinović	529	4.64	–
Coalition: Citizens' Group Prof. Đura Trudić, Teacher Jovan Devrnja and Movement of Socialists	500	4.38	–
Democratic Party of Serbia–Dr. Vojislav Koštunica–Petar Kozarev	415	3.64	–
League of Social Democrats of Vojvodina–Nenad Čanak	201	1.76	–
Citizens' Group: Moj Šor, Avlija i Komšija	160	1.40	–
Total	11,410	100.00	30
Valid votes	11,410	95.79	
Invalid/blank votes	501	4.21	
Total votes	11,911	100.00	
Registered voters/turnout	16,098	73.99	

A coalition government was formed in June 2012 by the Democratic Party's alliance, the Socialist Party of Serbia, and the Luki and United for Our Village groups. The coalition dissolved the following month and was succeeded by a new coalition including the Serbian Progressive Party, the Socialist Party, the United Regions of Serbia, and the Luki and United for Our Village lists. Sava Čojčić of G17 Plus, the main party in the United Regions of Serbia coalition, was chosen as mayor.

The United Regions of Serbia became a unified party in April 2013, and Čojčić joined the organization. Two months later, he and the entire United Regions of Serbia group joined the Progressive Party.

The coalition government formed in 2012 was ultimately unstable, and the local assembly was dissolved in November 2013. Čojčić was appointed to lead a provisional administration pending a new election in 2014.

===== Ruma =====
Results of the election for the Municipal Assembly of Ruma:

Party	Votes	%	Seats
Democratic Party–Boris Tadić	7,025	26.86	14
Let's Get Ruma Moving–Tomislav Nikolić (Serbian Progressive Party, New Serbia, Strength of Serbia Movement, United Serbia, Movement of Socialists, Social Democratic Party of Serbia)	5,443	20.81	11
Serbian Radical Party–Dr. Aleksandar Martinović	3,616	13.83	7
Ivica Dačić–"Socialist Party of Serbia SPS–Party of United Pensioners of Serbia PUPS"	3,421	13.08	6
Dr. Snežana Bojanić Stojić–Democratic Party of Serbia	2,556	9.77	5
Čedomir Jovanović–U-Turn–Liberal Democratic Party–Serbian Renewal Movement–Citizens' Group: Srem Revivial–Citizens' Group: My Ruma	1,346	5.15	–
Citizens' Group: A Family of Enterprising Citizens for the Revival of Ruma	909	3.48	–
League of Social Democrats of Vojvodina–Nenad Čanak	898	3.43	–
United Regions of Serbia	702	2.68	–
Social Democratic Alliance	237	0.91	–
Total	26,153	100.00	43
Valid votes	26,153	95.33	
Invalid/blank votes	1,282	4.67	
Total votes	27,435	100.00	
Registered voters/turnout	47,664	57.56	

Incumbent mayor Goran Vuković of the Democratic Party was confirmed for another term in office after the election. The government was moved by the Democratic Party, the Socialist Party of Serbia–Party of United Pensioners of Serbia alliance, and the Democratic Party of Serbia. There was an effort to remove Vuković in September 2012, but this was unsuccessful.

A new governing coalition was formed in late 2013, and Dragan Panić of the Serbian Progressive Party was chosen as mayor in December of that year. Panić resigned in October 2014 and was replaced by Slađan Mančić of the same party.

Aleksandar Martinović was re-elected to the assembly at the head of the Serbian Radical Party's list. He left the Radicals to join the Progressives on 4 July 2012 and was chosen as president of the assembly in November 2013.

===== Šid =====
Results of the election for the Municipal Assembly of Šid:

Party	Votes	%	Seats
Democratic Party–Boris Tadić	4,662	26.28	12
Let's Get Šid Moving–Tomislav Nikolić (Serbian Progressive Party, New Serbia, Strength of Serbia Movement, Association of Serbs from Croatia and Bosnia and Herzegovina (True Šid))	3,179	17.92	8
Democratic Party of Serbia–Dr. Krsto Kureš	2,672	15.06	7
Ivica Dačić–Socialist Party of Serbia SPS–Party of United Pensioners of Serbia PUPS–United Serbia JS–Dr. Branislav Mauković	2,644	14.91	6
Serbian Radical Party–Dr. Aleksandar Martinović	1,405	7.92	3
League of Social Democrats of Vojvodina–Nenad Čanak	1,233	6.95	3
Citizens' Group: Citizens' Association–Citizen's Initiative–Open–Cvetin Aničić	664	3.74	–
U-Turn–Predrag Kaščak (Liberal Democratic Party, Rich Serbia)	519	2.93	–
United Regions of Serbia–Mlađan Dinkić	437	2.46	–
Serb Democratic Party	322	1.82	–
Total	17,737	100.00	39
Valid votes	17,737	96.35	
Invalid/blank votes	671	3.65	
Total votes	18,408	100.00	
Registered voters/turnout	31,306	58.80	

Incumbent mayor Nataša Cvjetković of the Democratic Party was confirmed for a new term in office after the election. The governing coalition initially included the Democratic Party, the Democratic Party of Serbia, the Socialist Party of Serbia, and the League of Social Democrats of Vojvodina.

In September 2012, a new coalition was formed by the Serbian Progressive Party, the Democratic Party of Serbia, and the alliance around the Socialist Party of Serbia. Nikola Vasić of the Serbian Progressive Party was chosen as mayor.

===== Stara Pazova =====
Results of the election for the Municipal Assembly of Stara Pazova:

Party	Votes	%	Seats
Let's Get Stara Pazova Moving–Tomislav Nikolić (Serbian Progressive Party, New Serbia, Serb Democratic Party, Movement of Socialists-Stara Pazova)	8,054	25.52	16
Choice for a Better Life–Boris Tadić (Democratic Party)	6,812	21.59	13
Ivica Dačić–Socialist Party of Serbia (SPS), Party of United Pensioners of Serbia (PUPS)–Dr. Rada Inđić	3,431	10.87	7
Democratic Party of Serbia–Dr. Vojislav Koštunica	2,899	9.19	5
Serbian Radical Party–Dr. Aleksandar Martinović	1,975	6.26	4
"United Serbia–Dragan Marković Palma"	1,863	5.90	3
United Regions of Serbia–Mijodrag Mojić	1,391	4.41	–
Dveri "For the Life of Pazova"	1,363	4.32	–
Citizens' Group: Nova Pazova - Municipality–Vuk M. Đuričić, Dipl.Ecc Master for Tourism and Dipl. Eng. Agr.	1,036	3.28	–
Čedomir Jovanović–U-Turn–Liberal Democratic Party, Serbian Renewal Movement, Rich Serbia, Social Democratic Party of Serbia)	894	2.83	–
League of Social Democrats of Vojvodina–Nenad Čanak	518	1.64	–
Party of Vojvodina Slovaks	488	1.55	–
Citizens' Group: SOS Movement	449	1.42	–
Movement of Workers and Peasants–Kosta Kristić	385	1.22	–
Total	31,558	100.00	48
Valid votes	31,558	95.85	
Invalid/blank votes	1,368	4.15	
Total votes	32,926	100.00	
Registered voters/turnout	55,125	59.73	

Đorđe Radinović of the Serbian Progressive Party was appointed as mayor after the election.

==== West Bačka District ====
Local elections were held in the one city (Sombor) and two of the other three municipalities in the West Bačka District. The exception was Odžaci, where the most recent local election had taken place in 2010. The Democratic Party won plurality victories in Sombor and Kula and initially formed government in both jurisdictions; by 2014, however, shifting political alliances had brought the Serbian Progressive Party to power in both areas. In Apatin, longtime Socialist Party mayor Živorad Smiljanić led his party to another victory.

===== Sombor =====
Results of the election for the City Assembly of Sombor:

Party	Votes	%	Seats
Democratic Party Boris Tadić	9,488	22.35	16
Let's Get Sombor Moving–Tomislav Nikolić (Serbian Progressive Party, New Serbia, Strength of Serbia Movement)	6,470	15.24	11
"Dušan Jovič–United Regions of Serbia" (G17 Plus, Citizens' Group, People's Party)	3,848	9.06	6
"Ivica Dačić–Socialist Party of Serbia (SPS), Social Democratic Party of Serbia (SDPS)"	3,340	7.87	5
Democratic Party of Serbia–Vojislav Koštunica	2,836	6.68	5
Žika Gojković "Our City, Our Duty!" SPO	2,672	6.29	4
Serbian Radical Party Dr. Aleksandar Martinović	2,287	5.39	4
Citizens' Group: Better Sombor	2,241	5.28	3
League of Social Democrats of Vojvodina–Nenad Čanak	2,202	5.19	3
Alliance of Vojvodina Hungarians–István Pásztor	1,938	4.56	3
"Dveri For the Life of Sombor"	1,683	3.96	–
Čedomir Jovanović–U-Turn–Liberal Democratic Party, Social Democratic Union, and Vojvodina's Party	1,530	3.60	–
Democratic Fellowship of Vojvodina Hungarians–Marta Horvat Odri	1,062	2.50	1
PUPS–Party of Honourable Purpose, Surely	468	1.10	–
Serb Democratic Party	393	0.93	–
Total	42,458	100.00	61
Valid votes	42,458	96.42	
Invalid/blank votes	1,578	3.58	
Total votes	44,036	100.00	
Registered voters/turnout	78,819	55.87	

Incumbent mayor Nemanja Delić of the Democratic Party was confirmed for another term in office after the election. He was removed from office in April 2014 amid shifting political alliances in the city and was replaced by Saša Todorović of the Progressive Party.

Parliamentarian Žika Gojković was elected to the city assembly from the first position on the SPO list. He resigned his seat on 16 February 2013.

===== Apatin =====
Results of the election for the Municipal Assembly of Apatin:

Party	Votes	%	Seats
Dr. Živorad Smiljanić Socialist Party of Serbia (SPS)–Party of United Pensioners of Serbia (PUPS)	5,012	32.76	13
Choice for a Better Life–Boris Tadić (Democratic Party, Social Democratic Party of Serbia, Democratic Alliance of Croats in Vojvodina)	2,613	17.08	6
Serbian Radical Party–Dr. Aleksandar Martinović	1,452	9.49	3
Citizens' Group: "Movement for Apatin"–Milan Dražic	1,271	8.31	3
Let's Get Apatin Moving–Tomislav Nikolić (Serbian Progressive Party)	1,108	7.24	2
Alliance of Vojvodina Hungarians–István Pásztor	1,006	6.58	2
Citizens' Group: "Dveri Apatin"	692	4.52	–
Citizens' Group: "For a Healthy Apatin"–Dr. Miodrag Pavlović	628	4.10	–
Communist Party–Josip Broz	407	2.66	–
United Regions of Serbia–Sanja Bačić	366	2.39	–
Democratic Party of Serbia–Vojislav Koštunica	303	1.98	–
Movement of Socialists–Aleksandar Vulin	238	1.56	–
U-Turn coalition–Predrag Cvjetićanin (Liberal Democratic Party, Serbian Renewal Movement)	203	1.33	–
Total	15,299	100.00	29
Valid votes	15,299	95.94	
Invalid/blank votes	648	4.06	
Total votes	15,947	100.00	
Registered voters/turnout	27,220	58.59	

Incumbent mayor Živorad Smiljanić of the Socialist Party was confirmed for another term in office after the election. He resigned in October 2013 following a conflict-of-interest warning but was re-elected as mayor on the same day.

===== Kula =====
Results of the election for the Municipal Assembly of Kula:

Party	Votes	%	Seats
Democratic Party–Boris Tadić	4,691	20.72	9
Let's Get Kula Moving–Tomislav Nikolić (Serbian Progressive Party)	3,695	16.32	7
Ivica Dačić–Socialist Party of Serbia, United Serbia	3,392	14.98	7
Democratic Party of Serbia–Dr. Vojislav Koštunica	2,950	13.03	6
United Regions of Serbia	1,365	6.03	2
Serbian Radical Party–Dr. Aleksandar Martinović	1,254	5.54	2
Čedomir Jovanović–U-Turn coalition (LDP, SPO)	1,205	5.32	2
Citizens' Group: Clean - Municipality: Crvenka, Sivac, Kruščić, N. Crvenka–Radonjić Hercen Keka	1,093	4.83	–
League of Social Democrats of Vojvodina–Nenad Čanak	1,078	4.76	–
Citizens' Group: "Dveri Kula"	970	4.28	–
Alliance of Vojvodina Hungarians–István Pásztor	951	4.20	2
Total	22,644	100.00	37
Valid votes	22,644	95.73	
Invalid/blank votes	1,009	4.27	
Total votes	23,653	100.00	
Registered voters/turnout	37,886	62.43	

Lazar Greber of the Democratic Party was chosen as mayor after the election. Following a change in government in October 2012, Greber was replaced by Dragan Trifunović of the Progressive Party.

===== Odžaci =====
There was no election for the Municipal Assembly of Odžaci in 2012. The previous election had taken place in 2010 and the next election took place in 2013.

=== Šumadija and Western Serbia ===
==== Mačva District ====
Local elections were held in both cities (i.e., Šabac and Loznica) and all six municipalities of the Mačva District. There was no consistent pattern in the outcomes throughout these jurisdictions.

The Democratic Party won a convincing victory in Šabac and afterward formed a local coalition government. After a party split later in 2012, many of its delegates joined the breakaway Together for Serbia party, which afterward became the dominant force in the local governing coalition. The Democratic Party also won the elections in Bogatić and Vladimirci and formed coalition governments in both jurisdictions. In Bogatić, a new coalition of the Serbian Progressive Party and the Socialist Party of Serbia came in power in 2013, and in Vladimirci a similar coalition took power in 2015.

The Socialist Party won the elections in Krupanj, Ljubovija, and Mali Zvornik. In Krupanj, the party initially formed a coalition government with the Democratic Party; in 2013, it formed a new coalition with the Progressives. In Ljubovija, the Socialists initially governed in coalition with the Progressives, although the parties subsequently became rivals for power and control of the municipal assembly changed several times. In Mali Zvornik, the Socialists were the dominant force in the local government until 2014, when they were displaced by the Progressives.

Vidoje Petrović led the United Regions of Serbia to victory in Loznica, and Veroljub Matić led his independent list to victory in Koceljeva. Both later joined the Progressives.

Although the Serbian Progressive Party did not win any of the Mačva District's cities or municipalities in 2012, it had become a prominent force in most of its local governments by 2016.

===== Šabac =====
Results of the election for the City Assembly of Šabac:

Party	Votes	%	Seats
Choice for a Better Life–Boris Tadić–Democratic Party	18,542	30.74	25
Let's Get Šabac Moving–Tomislav Nikolić (Serbian Progressive Party, New Serbia, Strength of Serbia Movement, Roma Party)	10,509	17.42	14
URS–Nemanja Pajić, United Regions	7,633	12.66	11
Ivica Dačić–Socialist Party of Serbia, Social Democratic Party of Serbia–Zoran Bortić	5,607	9.30	8
Čedomir Jovanović–U-Turn—Liberal Democratic Party, Serbian Renewal Movement, Rich Serbia	3,938	6.53	6
Democratic Party of Serbia–Vojislav Koštunica, United Peasant Party	3,773	6.26	5
Serbian Radical Party–Dr. Aleksandar Martinović	2,637	4.37	–
Citizens' Group: Dveri Šabac	1,799	2.98	–
Citizens' Group: For Šabac and Progressive Municipalities–Nikolić Slobodan (Russian Democratic Party)	1,264	2.10	–
Citizens' Group: For Our Šabac	1,066	1.77	–
Dragan Marković Palma–United Serbia	1,060	1.76	–
Communist Party–Josip Broz	1,010	1.67	–
Party of United Pensioners of Serbia (PUPS)–Stevan Matić	795	1.32	–
New Social Democratic Party of Serbia Šabac–Vladan Kulezić	679	1.13	–
Total	60,312	100.00	69
Valid votes	60,312	95.06	
Invalid/blank votes	3,134	4.94	
Total votes	63,446	100.00	
Registered voters/turnout	105,283	60.26	

Incumbent mayor Miloš Milošević of the Democratic Party was confirmed for another term in office after the election. The Democratic Party later experienced a split, and a number of the party's elected representatives, including Milošević, joined the breakaway Together for Serbia. Milošević resigned as mayor in 2014 and was replaced by Nebojša Zelenović, also of Together for Serbia.

===== Bogatić =====
Results of the election for the Municipal Assembly of Bogatić:

Party	Votes	%	Seats
Democratic Party–Boris Tadić	2,580	16.04	6
New Serbia	2,380	14.80	6
Ivica Dačić–Socialist Party of Serbia (SPS)	2,299	14.30	5
Let's Get Bogatić Moving–Tomislav Nikolić (Serbian Progressive Party)	1,999	12.43	4
United Regions Bogatić–Prim. Dr. Svetlana Knežević	1,312	8.16	3
Dragan Marković Palma–United Serbia–Leonid Radovanović	1,270	7.90	3
Citizens' Group: Positive Mačva	1,180	7.34	2
Citizens' Group: Mačva European Region	835	5.19	2
Democratic Party of Serbia–Vojislav Koštunica	768	4.78	–
Čedomir Jovanović–U-Turn—Vladan Jošić Liberal Democratic Party, Serbian Renewal Movement, United Peasant Party	672	4.18	–
Serbian Radical Party–Dr. Aleksandar Martinović	597	3.71	–
Party of United Pensioners of Serbia	190	1.18	–
Total	16,082	100.00	31
Valid votes	16,055	96.22	
Invalid/blank votes	630	3.78	
Total votes	16,685	100.00	
Registered voters/turnout	25,606	65.16	

Incumbent mayor Slobodan Savić of the Democratic Party was confirmed for a new term in office after the election, leading a coalition that included the Democratic Party, New Serbia, the Socialist Party of Serbia, and United Serbia. Following a political realignment in July 2013, Savić was dismissed as mayor and replaced by Nenad Beserovac of the Socialist Party of Serbia.

===== Koceljeva =====
Results of the election for the Municipal Assembly of Koceljeva:

Party	Votes	%	Seats
Citizens' Group: Veroljub Matić	3,498	43.86	18
Socialist Party of Serbia–Party of United Pensioners of Serbia	1,931	24.21	9
United Serbia	684	8.58	3
Democratic Party–Serbian Renewal Movement–Liberal Democratic Party	364	4.56	–
Democratic Party of Serbia	355	4.45	–
Serbian Progressive Party–New Serbia	351	4.40	–
Dveri	253	3.17	–
Roma Union of Serbia	236	2.96	1
Roma Party	180	2.26	–
Serbian Radical Party	123	1.54	–
Total	7,975	100.00	31
Valid votes	7,975	96.26	
Invalid/blank votes	310	3.74	
Total votes	8,285	100.00	
Registered voters/turnout	8,285	100.00	

Incumbent mayor Veroljub Matić was confirmed for another term in office after the election. In 2013, his citizens' group merged into the Serbian Progressive Party. He resigned as mayor in 2014 after being elected to the Serbian parliament and was replaced by Dušan Ilinčić, also of the Progressive Party.

===== Krupanj =====
Results of the election for the Municipal Assembly of Krupanj:

Party	Votes	%	Seats
Ivica Dačić–"Socialist Party of Serbia (SPS)"	1,588	20.12	10
"Democratic Party–Boris Tadić"	1,384	17.54	8
Citizens' Groups (four different lists)	1,141	14.46	2
"Let's Get Krupanj Moving–Tomislav Nikolić" (Serbian Progressive Party)	1,139	14.43	7
Democratic Party of Serbia–Vojislav Koštunica	1,026	13.00	6
"United Regions of Serbia–Dr. Zlatko Perišić"	475	6.02	2
"Serbian Radical Party–Dr. Aleksandar Martinović"	405	5.13	–
"New Serbia–Movement of Socialists–Dr. Savo Dorić"	394	4.99	–
Čedomir Jovanović–U-Turn—Danka Pajić (Liberal Democratic Party, Social Democratic Union)	263	3.33	–
"Dragan Marković Palma–United Serbia"	76	0.96	–
Total	7,891	100.00	35
Valid votes	7,891	95.81	
Invalid/blank votes	345	4.19	
Total votes	8,236	100.00	
Registered voters/turnout	14,712	55.98	

Nenad Vasiljević of the Democratic Party was chosen as mayor after the election, and Rade Grujić of the Socialist Party of Serbia was chosen as deputy mayor. The Democratic Party of Serbia was also a part of the local government. In March 2013, a new coalition of the Socialist Party, the Serbian Progressive Party, and the United Regions of Serbia came to power, and Grujić was named as mayor.

===== Ljubovija =====
Results of the election for the Municipal Assembly of Ljubovija:

Party	Votes	%	Seats
Ivica Dačić–Socialist Party of Serbia (SPS)–Party of United Pensioners of Serbia (PUPS)–Miroslav Mićić	2,733	33.14	14
Democratic Party of Serbia–Vojislav Koštunica	1,340	16.25	7
"Let's Get Ljubovija Moving–Tomislav Nikolić Serbian Progressive Party"	921	11.17	4
Democratic Party–Boris Tadić	775	9.40	4
U-Turn—Dr. Vet. Miloš Damnjanović (Liberal Democratic Party, Social Democratic Union)	590	7.15	3
United Regions of Serbia–Vidoje Jevremović	586	7.10	3
Dragan Marković Palma–United Serbia	419	5.08	–
New Serbia–Velimir Ilić	375	4.55	–
Serbian Radical Party–Dr. Aleksandar Martinović	359	4.35	–
Dveri for the Life of Serbia	150	1.82	–
Total	8,248	100.00	35
Valid votes	8,248	96.68	
Invalid/blank votes	283	3.32	
Total votes	8,531	100.00	
Registered voters/turnout	12,462	68.46	

Miroslav Mićić of the Socialist Party of Serbia was chosen as mayor after the election, governing in a coalition with the Serbian Progressive Party and the United Regions of Serbia.

Several delegates changed their party affiliation during the term that followed. Former mayor Milovan Kovačević left the Socialist Party and formed his own Movement for Change group. Kovačević briefly succeeded in forming his own governing coalition in April 2013, but after about ten days Mićić reassembled his coalition and returned to power. In November 2014, the Progressives, the Serbian Renewal Movement, and Movement for Change for a new coalition administration, with Kovačević once again as mayor.

Mićić was again returned to the mayor's office in May 2015, with a majority that included the Socialist Party–Party of United Pensioners of Serbia alliance, two delegates from the Progressives, and one delegate each from the Serbian Renewal Movement and Together for Serbia.

===== Loznica =====
Results of the election for the City Assembly of Loznica:

Party	Votes	%	Seats
Vidoje Petrović–URS	11,295	29.18	21
Let's Get Loznica Moving–Tomislav Nikolić (Serbian Progressive Party, Strength of Serbia Movement, Movement of Socialists, Roma Party)	6,392	16.51	12
Democratic Party–Boris Tadić	4,151	10.72	7
Ivica Dačić–Socialist Party of Serbia (SPS) Social Democratic Party of Serbia (SDPS)–Rasim Ljajić	3,822	9.87	7
PUPS–Dr. Nikola Sremčević	2,836	7.33	5
Dragan Marković Palma–United Serbia–Stanoje Filipović Fića	2,433	6.29	4
Citizens' Group: Businessmen and Farmers–Movement for Loznica–Dobrivoje Boban Stojnić	2,125	5.49	3
Čedomir Jovanović–U-Turn—Dr. Zoran Jović (Liberal Democratic Party, Social Democratic Union)	1,964	5.07	–
Serbian Radical Party–"Dr. Aleksandar Martinović"	1,230	3.18	–
Democratic Party of Serbia–Vojislav Koštunica	1,186	3.06	–
Dveri for the Life of Serbia–Loznica	887	2.29	–
Communist Party–Josip Broz	384	0.99	–
Total	38,705	100.00	59
Valid votes	38,705	95.97	
Invalid/blank votes	1,624	4.03	
Total votes	40,329	100.00	
Registered voters/turnout	73,746	54.69	

Incumbent mayor Vidoje Petrović of the United Regions of Serbia was confirmed for another term in office after the election. The United Regions of Serbia had become largely dormant by 2015, and Petrović joined the Serbian Progressive Party in that year.

===== Mali Zvornik =====
Results of the election for the Municipal Assembly of Mali Zvornik:

Party	Votes	%	Seats
Ivica Dačić–Socialist Party of Serbia	1,296	17.82	6
Citizens' Group: Revival–Radovan Tadić	1,056	14.52	4
Democratic Party–Boris Tadić	1,019	14.01	4
Democratic Party of Serbia	763	10.49	3
Let's Get Mali Zvornik Moving–Tomislav Nikolić (Serbian Progressive Party, New Serbia, Strength of Serbia Movement)	728	10.01	3
United Regions of Serbia–Dr. Milan Lukić	699	9.61	3
Serbian Radical Party–Dr. Aleksandar Martinović	678	9.32	3
Citizens' Group: "For Mali Zvornik Žićo Jokić"	669	9.20	3
Social Democratic Party of Serbia–Rasim Ljajić	256	3.52	–
Dragan Marković Palma–United Serbia–Stanoje Filipović Fića	109	1.50	–
Total	7,273	100.00	29
Valid votes	7,273	96.41	
Invalid/blank votes	271	3.59	
Total votes	7,544	100.00	
Registered voters/turnout	12,605	59.85	

Incumbent mayor Miodrag Lazić of the Socialist Party of Serbia was confirmed for a new term in office following the election. Lazić resigned on 1 February 2014 and was replaced by his party colleague Dragan Bogićević. Bogićević in turn resigned in November 2014, after a political realignment in which four Socialist delegates switched their affiliation to the Serbian Progressive Party. His replacement was Zoran Jevtić of the Progressives.

===== Vladimirci =====
Results of the election for the Municipal Assembly of Vladimirci:

Party	Votes	%	Seats
Democratic Party–Boris Tadić	2,687	29.39	9
Let's Get Vladimirci Moving–Tomislav Nikolić (Serbian Progressive Party, Strength of Serbia Movement)	1,703	18.63	5
Ivica Dačić–"Socialist Party of Serbia, Party of United Pensioners of Serbia"–Nebojša Petronić	1,175	12.85	4
Citizens' Groups (two different lists)	877	9.59	2
Democratic Party of Serbia–Vojislav Koštunica–Milenko Arsić	841	9.20	2
Dragan Marković Palma–United Serbia–Marjan Sević	660	7.22	2
Serbian Radical Party–Dr. Aleksandar Martinović	582	6.37	1
Communist Party–Josip Broz	325	3.56	–
U-Turn—LDP, SPO, Rich Serbia, Green Ecological Party–The Greens	292	3.19	–
Total	9,142	100.00	25
Valid votes	9,142	95.15	
Invalid/blank votes	466	4.85	
Total votes	9,608	100.00	
Registered voters/turnout	15,709	61.16	

Incumbent mayor Vladica Marković of the Democratic Party was confirmed for another term in office after the election. In March 2015, a new coalition of the Socialist Party of Serbia and the Serbian Progressive Party came to power, and Dragan Simeunović of the Socialists was chosen as mayor. His term in office proved brief, and in June 2015 he was succeeded by Milorad Milinković of the Progressives.

==== Moravica District ====
Local elections were held in the one city (Čačak) and all three other municipalities of the Moravica District. New Serbia won an extremely narrow victory in its historical stronghold of Čačak and continued to lead a coalition government afterward. The Socialists remained in power in Gornji Milanovac, an independent list formed government in Ivanjica, and the Democratic Party led a government in Lučani (despite having finished second).

===== Čačak =====
Results of the election for the City Assembly of Čačak:

Party	Votes	%	Seats
New Serbia–Democratic Party of Serbia–Velimir Ilić	9,073	16.56	14
Choice for a Better Life–Boris Tadić (Democratic Party)	9,069	16.56	14
Let's Get Čačak Moving–Tomislav Nikolić–Serbian Progressive Party–Strength of Serbia Movement–Movement of Socialists	8,964	16.36	13
Dveri Srpske–For the Life of Čačak Dr. Milan Roganović	8,891	16.23	13
Ivica Dačić–Socialist Party of Serbia (SPS)–Party of United Pensioners of Serbia (PUPS)	8,384	15.30	12
United Regions of Serbia Čačak, "League for Čačak"–Mlađan Dinkić	3,810	6.96	5
Čedomir Jovanović–U-Turn (Liberal Democratic Party, Serbian Renewal Movement)	3,147	5.74	4
Serbian Radical Party–Dr. Aleksandar Martinović	1,211	2.21	–
United Serbia–Dragan Marković Palma	966	1.76	–
"For a Better Čačak" Olga Jakšic, Democratic Party of Macedonians–National Minority	603	1.10	–
Social Democratic Alliance, "Serbian Freedom Movement"–Dr. Momčilo Vujičić	338	0.62	–
Maja Gojković–People's Party	324	0.59	–
Total	54,780	100.00	75
Valid votes	54,780	95.36	
Invalid/blank votes	2,665	4.64	
Total votes	57,445	100.00	
Registered voters/turnout	100,496	57.16	

Vojislav Ilić, the brother of New Serbia leader Velimir Ilić (and himself a member of the same party), was chosen as mayor after the election. Future parliamentarian Biljana Rubaković was elected from the sixth position on the Dveri list.

Snežana Bogosavljević Bošković of the Socialist Party of Serbia was elected from the eleventh position on her party's list. She resigned her seat on 31 August 2012.

===== Gornji Milanovac =====
Results of the election for the Municipal Assembly of Gornji Milanovac:

Party	Votes	%	Seats
Ivica Dačić–Socialist Party of Serbia (SPS), Party of United Pensioners of Serbia (PUPS), Movement for the Municipality of Gornji Milanovac	8,578	38.20	20
Let's Get Gornji Milanovac Moving–Tomislav Nikolić (Serbian Progressive Party, Movement of Socialists)	4,018	17.89	9
Democratic Party–Mileta Vulović	2,774	12.35	6
Democratic Party of Serbia–Dragan Petrović	1,957	8.72	5
United Regions of Serbia, Young Milanovac–Dr. Miro Lazarević	1,950	8.68	5
New Serbia Mr. Velimir Ilić	1,558	6.94	4
Čedomir Jovanović–U-Turn (Liberal Democratic Party, Serbian Renewal Movement, Social Democratic Party of Serbia)	990	4.41	–
Serbian Radical Party–Dr. Aleksandar Martinović	630	2.81	–
Total	22,455	100.00	49
Valid votes	22,455	95.06	
Invalid/blank votes	1,166	4.94	
Total votes	23,621	100.00	
Registered voters/turnout	38,420	61.48	

Incumbent mayor Milisav Mirković of the Socialist Party was confirmed for another term in office after the election.

===== Ivanjica =====
Results of the election for the Municipal Assembly of Ivanjica:

Party	Votes	%	Seats
Citizens' Group: Milomir Zorić	4,614	28.66	12
Let's Get Ivanjica Moving–Tomislav Nikolić–Serbian Progressive Party–New Serbia–Strength of Serbia Movement–Movement of Socialists)	3,039	18.88	8
Ivica Dačić–Socialist Party of Serbia (SPS), PUPS, SDP Serbia–Dragovan Milinković	2,909	18.07	7
Democratic Party–Boris Tadić	1,598	9.93	4
United Regions of Serbia–Radomir Ristić	974	6.05	2
Democratic Party of Serbia–Stevan Davidović	925	5.75	2
Čedomir Jovanović–U-Turn!–LDP–SPO	884	5.49	2
Serbian Radical Party–Dr. Aleksandar Martinović	587	3.65	–
Citizens' Group: Movement of Workers and Peasants	373	2.32	–
Citizens' Group: Stop Thieves–Dragutin Popović–Dragan Popac	197	1.22	–
Total	16,100	100.00	37
Valid votes	16,100	96.34	
Invalid/blank votes	612	3.66	
Total votes	16,712	100.00	
Registered voters/turnout	27,455	60.87	

Independent candidate Milomir Zorić was chosen as mayor after the election, in a coalition with the Progressives, the Democratic Party of Serbia, the Party of United Pensioners of Serbia, and the Serbian Renewal Movement. The Progressives left the coalition in December 2013, leading to a period of a political stalemate. In October 2014, Zorić formed a new coalition with the Socialists.

===== Lučani =====
Results of the election for the Municipal Assembly of Lučani:

Party	Votes	%	Seats
Citizens' Group: Movement for the Development of Dragačevo	2,757	24.59	12
Democratic Party–Boris Tadić	2,264	20.19	10
Ivica Dačić–Socialist Party of Serbia (SPS)–United Serbia (JS)	1,367	12.19	6
New Serbia–Velimir Ilić–Democratic Party of Serbia–Vojislav Koštunica	1,209	10.78	5
Let's Get Lučani Moving–Tomislav Nikolić Serbian Progressive Party–Strength of Serbia Movement	958	8.54	4
United Regions of Serbia–Prim. Dr. Duško Šuluburić	935	8.34	4
Čedomir Jovanović–U-Turn–LDP–SPO	895	7.98	4
Citizens' Group: Movement of Workers and Peasants–Raško Milovanović	289	2.58	–
Movement of Veterans–Čedomir Živanović	281	2.51	–
Serbian Radical Party–Dr. Aleksandar Martinović	259	2.31	–
Total	11,214	100.00	45
Valid votes	11,214	96.63	
Invalid/blank votes	391	3.37	
Total votes	11,605	100.00	
Registered voters/turnout	18,183	63.82	

Mladomir Sretenović of the Democratic Party was chosen as mayor after the election. The Movement for the Development of Dragačevo list boycotted the inaugural session of the assembly. When the Democratic Party split in early 2014, Sretenović sided with Boris Tadić's breakaway New Democratic Party (later renamed as the Social Democratic Party). The local government was dissolved and new elections were held in 2014.

==== Pomoravlje District ====
Local elections were held in the one city (Jagodina) and all five other municipalities of the Pomoravlje District. United Serbia won a majority victory in its home base of Jagodina in an alliance with the Socialist Party of Serbia. The Democratic Party won the elections and formed government in Despotovac, Paraćin, and Svilajnac, although by the end of the term it only remained in power in Paraćin. The Serbian Progressive Party and the Socialists formed a new government in Despotovac in 2013, and the Democratic Party in Svilajnac later formed his own political movement.

The Progressives won the election in Ćuprija and, after an initial period of instability, formed government in the community. A member of the Socialist Party became the mayor in Rekovac following an inconclusive election in that municipality.

===== Jagodina =====
Results of the election for the City Assembly of Jagodina:

Party	Votes	%	Seats
Dragan Marković Palma–United Serbia (JS), Socialist Party of Serbia (SPS), Party of United Pensioners of Serbia (PUPS)	20,371	60.66	22
Let's Get Jagodina Moving–Tomislav Nikolić (Serbian Progressive Party, Strength of Serbia Movement)	3,590	10.69	4
Democratic Party–Boris Tadić	2,871	8.55	3
Democratic Party of Serbia	1,908	5.68	2
Citizens' Group: Dveri for the Life of Jagodina – List Holder: Dragoslav Stevanović Nine	1,266	3.77	–
United Regions of Serbia–Mlađan Dinkić	1,259	3.75	–
Čedomir Jovanović–U-Turn–Liberal Democratic Party and Serbian Renewal Movement	1,151	3.43	–
Serbian Radical Party–Dr. Aleksandar Martinović	740	2.20	–
Social Democratic Movement–Bratislav Filipović	247	0.74	–
Social Democratic Alliance	179	0.53	–
Total	33,582	100.00	31
Valid votes	33,582	94.38	
Invalid/blank votes	2,000	5.62	
Total votes	35,582	100.00	
Registered voters/turnout	64,118	55.49	

Ratko Stevanović of United Serbia was chosen as mayor after the election.

United Serbia leader and incumbent mayor Dragan Marković Palma was elected from the lead position on his party's list and was subsequently appointed as speaker of the city assembly. Petar Petrović was also elected on the United Serbia list and was appointed as deputy speaker.

Života Starčević was re-elected to the assembly from the lead position on the Democratic Party of Serbia list. He joined United Serbia in October 2014.

===== Ćuprija =====
Results of the election for the Municipal Assembly of Ćuprija:

Party	Votes	%	Seats
Let's Get Ćuprija Moving–Tomislav Nikolić (Serbian Progressive Party), Nebojša Sadžaković	2,604	16.34	7
Citizens' Group: "Ravanica"–Radosav Đorđević Ćuprija, Radosav Đorđević	2,497	15.67	6
Citizens' Group: Morava City–Ninoslav Erić, Ninoslav Erić	2,035	12.77	5
Party of United Pensioners of Serbia PUPS–Dr. Miroslav Stojanović "Mića Brica", Miroslav Stojanović	1,877	11.78	5
Siniša Anđelković–United Regions of Serbia, Siniša Anđelković	1,741	10.92	4
Ivica Dačić–Socialist Party of Serbia (SPS), United Serbia (JS) SPS-Ivica Dačić–JS-Dragan Marković Palma, Zoran Milivojević	1,567	9.83	4
Democratic Party–Boris Tadić, Goran Petrović	1,535	9.63	4
Democratic Party of Serbia, Zoran Trailović	878	5.51	2
Čedomir Jovanović–U-Turn–Katić Milorad (Liberal Democratic Party, Serbian Renewal Movement), Katić Milorad	665	4.17	–
"Movement of Peasants and Workers and Vlachs of Ćuprija–Anta Nonić", Boban Jovanović	303	1.90	–
"Serbian Radical Party–Dr. Aleksandar Martinović", Nenad Pavlović	237	1.49	–
Total	15,939	100.00	37
Valid votes	15,939	96.31	
Invalid/blank votes	611	3.69	
Total votes	16,550	100.00	
Registered voters/turnout	30,031	55.11	

The election did not produce a clear winner. Slobodan Lazić of the Socialist Party of Serbia was initially chosen as mayor. He resigned in December 2012 after being advised he was in a conflict-of-interest situation. His replacement was Radosav Đorđević, the leader of the Ravanica list.

In June 2013, the Serbian Progressive Party and the Democratic Party formed a new administration. Ninoslav Erić, who by this time had joined the Progressives, was chosen as mayor.

===== Despotovac =====
Results of the election for the Municipal Assembly of Despotovac:

Party	Votes	%	Seats
Democratic Party–Boris Tadić	7,042	49.99	23
Let's Get Despotovac Moving–Tomislav Nikolić (Serbian Progressive Party, New Serbia, Democratic Party of Serbia)	4,304	30.55	14
Ivica Dačić–SPS–PUPS–JS	1,796	12.75	5
United Regions of Serbia–Dragan Bogdanović	945	6.71	3
Total	14,087	100.00	45
Valid votes	14,087	97.00	
Invalid/blank votes	436	3.00	
Total votes	14,523	100.00	
Registered voters/turnout	24,622	58.98	

Incumbent mayor Mališa Alimpijević of the Democratic Party was chosen as mayor after the election. In January 2013, the Serbian Progressive Party and the Socialist Party of Serbia formed a new administration with Dejan Nenadović of the Socialists in the role of mayor.

===== Paraćin =====
Results of the election for the Municipal Assembly of Paraćin:

Party	Votes	%	Seats
Democratic Party–Saša Paunović	10,317	34.20	22
All for Paraćin–Tomislav Šaletić (Serbian Renewal Movement, Citizens' Group, Rich Serbia)	3,705	12.28	7
United Regions of Serbia–Mlađan Dinkić	3,428	11.36	7
United Serbia–Movement for the City and the Village–Dragan Marković Palma	2,745	9.10	5
Let's Get Paraćin Moving–Tomislav Nikolić (Serbian Progressive Party, New Serbia)	2,663	8.83	5
Citizens' Group: Let's Employ Paraćin–Aca Pajić	2,336	7.74	5
Socialist Party of Serbia–Ivica Dačić	2,258	7.48	4
Dveri–The Only Choice	778	2.58	–
Serbian Radical Party–Dr. Aleksandar Martinović	753	2.50	–
Democratic Party of Serbia–Dr. Goran Ivanković	743	2.46	–
Čedomir Jovanović–U-Turn–Ivan Atanasković, Liberal Democratic Party, Social Democratic Union	445	1.47	–
Total	30,171	100.00	55
Valid votes	30,171	96.34	
Invalid/blank votes	1,147	3.66	
Total votes	31,318	100.00	
Registered voters/turnout	50,223	62.36	

Incumbent mayor Saśa Paunović of the Democratic Party was confirmed for another term in office after the election.

===== Rekovac =====
Results of the election for the Municipal Assembly of Rekovac:

Party	Votes	%	Seats
Democratic Party–Boris Tadić	2,053	27.79	10
Ivica Dačić–Socialist Party of Serbia (SPS)	1,287	17.42	6
Democratic Party of Serbia	1,082	14.65	5
Dragan Marković Palma–United Serbia	980	13.26	5
Let's Get Rekovac Moving–Tomislav Nikolić (Serbian Progressive Party, New Serbia)	647	8.76	3
United Regions of Serbia–Prof. Dr. Petar Veselinović	423	5.73	2
Citizens' Group: Levač-Levču	396	5.36	2
Citizens' Group: "Voice for Levač" Dr. Miroslav Stevanovski	356	4.82	–
"Dveri for the Life of Rekovac"	164	2.22	–
Total	7,388	100.00	33
Valid votes	7,388	96.25	
Invalid/blank votes	288	3.75	
Total votes	7,676	100.00	
Registered voters/turnout	10,401	73.80	

Predrag Đorđević of the Socialist Party of Serbia was chosen as mayor after the election.

===== Svilajnac =====
Results of the election for the Municipal Assembly of Svilajnac:

Party	Votes	%	Seats
Choice for a Better Life–Boris Tadić (Democratic Party)	4,514	32.31	17
Dr. Vladan Rajković–Socialist Party of Serbia (SPS)–United Serbia (JS)	3,514	25.15	13
Citizens' Group: "Movement for Svilajnac" General Miladinović, Marinko–Milomir Miladinović	2,066	14.79	8
Let's Get Svilajnac Moving–Tomislav Nikolić (Serbian Progressive Party)	1,721	12.32	6
Democratic Party of Serbia Gorica - Gora Gajić	753	5.39	3
United Regions of Serbia–Prof. Dr. Gorica Dimčić Tasić	724	5.18	–
Čedomir Jovanović–U-Turn (Liberal Democratic Party, Serbian Renewal Movement, Rich Serbia, Social Democratic Party of Serbia)	391	2.80	–
Serbian Radical Party–Dr. Aleksandar Martinović	290	2.08	–
Total	13,973	100.00	47
Valid votes	13,973	96.34	
Invalid/blank votes	531	3.66	
Total votes	14,504	100.00	
Registered voters/turnout	25,514	56.85	

Predrag Milanović of the Democratic Party was chosen as mayor after the election. Following a split in the party, he joined the Social Democratic Party under Boris Tadić's leadership. He later created his own local party called Svilajnac Protects the Future.

Gorica Gajić was elected from the lead position on the Democratic Party of Serbia list.

==== Rasina District ====
Local elections were held in the one city (Kruševac) and all five other municipalities of the Rasina District. Despite losing the popular vote, the Serbian Progressive Party and its allies were able to form a stable coalition government in Kruševac. The Serbian Renewal Movement likewise lost the popular vote in Varvarin but was able to remain in government under incumbent mayor Zoran Milenković.

The United Regions of Serbia formed government in Trstenik with Miroslav Aleksić as mayor; he continued in office after becoming leader of the People's Movement of Serbia in 2015. Zlatan Krkić of the Democratic Party was returned to office in Ćićevac and, similarly, remained in office after withdrawing from the party and creating his own political movement in 2015.

Milutin Jeličić led New Serbia to a plurality victory in Brus, but could not initially form a new administration; a coalition of the Progressives and the Socialist Party of Serbia governed for the next three years. In 2015, local divisions in the ranks of the Progressive Party brought Jeličić back to power. Jugoslav Stajkovac's independent list won the election in Aleksandrovac, but he too was not initially able to form a new administration. He briefly returned to the mayor's office in August 2012 and returned again leading a more stable administration in August 2013.

===== Kruševac =====
Results of the election for the City Assembly of Kruševac:

Party	Votes	%	Seats
"Dr. Katančević–Changes"–Dr. Branislav Katančević	14,218	23.10	20
Let's Get Kruševac Moving–Tomislav Nikolić (Serbian Progressive Party, New Serbia, Strength of Serbia Movement, Movement of Socialists)	13,120	21.31	18
Ivica Dačić–Socialist Party of Serbia (SPS)–United Serbia (JS)	10,274	16.69	14
Choice for a Better Life–Boris Tadić (Democratic Party, Social Democratic Party of Serbia, "Greens")	8,892	14.45	12
Democratic Party of Serbia–Vojislav Koštunica	4,278	6.95	6
United Regions of Serbia Kruševac–Vojkan Kulić	2,669	4.34	–
Serbian Radical Party–Dr. Aleksandar Martinović	2,137	3.47	–
Čedomir Jovanović–U-Turn (Liberal Democratic Party, Serbian Renewal Movement)	2,060	3.35	–
Party of United Pensioners of Serbia (PUPS)–Dr. Jovan Krkobabić–Gojko Čolić	1,499	2.44	–
Dveri for the Life of Kruševac–Petar Miladinović	1,317	2.14	–
Movement of Workers and Peasants–Ljubomir Bošković	1,091	1.77	–
Total	61,555	100.00	70
Valid votes	61,555	95.86	
Invalid/blank votes	2,656	4.14	
Total votes	64,211	100.00	
Registered voters/turnout	111,261	57.71	

Bratislav Gašić of the Serbian Progressive Party was chosen as mayor after the election. He resigned in April 2014 after being appointed as Serbia's minister of defence and was replaced by Dragi Nestorović, also of the Progressive Party.

===== Aleksandrovac =====
Results of the election for the Municipal Assembly of Aleksandrovac:

Party	Votes	%	Seats
Citizens' Group: "Movement for the Parish"–Mr. Jugoslav Stajkovac	6,862	40.25	26
Citizens' Group: "For a Rich Parish"–Rade Jevtović	3,284	19.26	12
"Democratic Party"–Boris Tadić	1,818	10.66	7
Ivica Dačić–"Socialist Party of Serbia (SPS), United Serbia (JS), Social Democratic Party of Serbia (SDPS)"	1,586	9.30	6
Let's Get Aleksandrovac Moving–Tomislav Nikolić (Serbian Progressive Party)	1,255	7.36	4
United Regions of Serbia Together for the Parish	1,060	6.22	4
Democratic Party of Serbia–Vojislav Koštunica	734	4.31	–
U-Turn LDP, SPO–Dr. Dejan Vukmirović	450	2.64	–
Total	17,049	100.00	59
Valid votes	17,049	96.40	
Invalid/blank votes	637	3.60	
Total votes	17,686	100.00	
Registered voters/turnout	24,052	73.53	

There were several changes in the composition of the municipal government of Aleksandrovac after the 2012 election.

Following difficult negotiations, a coalition government was established in June 2012 consisting of the For a Rich Parish group, the Democratic Party, the Socialist Party of Serbia–United Serbia group, and the Serbian Progressive Party, with outside support from the United Regions of Serbia. Zoran Bojović of the Progressives was chosen as mayor.

Former mayor Jugoslav Stajkovac's Movement for the Parish group formed a new alliance with the Socialist Party in August 2012, and Stajkovac was returned to the mayor's office in September. His administration fell within days, and a new coalition was established later in the same month by the Progressives, the Socialists, the United Regions of Serbia, the For a Rich Parish group, and the Democratic Party. Dragan Blagojević of the Progressives was chosen as mayor.

In March 2013, Stajkovac's group merged into the United Regions of Serbia and established a new assembly majority with the Progressives, the Socialists, and For a Rich Parish. Blagojević continued as mayor. This arrangement lasted until August 2013, when Stajkovac once again returned to the mayor's office, leading a new coalition of the URS, the Democratic Party and two former Progressive delegates. He later left the URS, which ceased to exist in 2015, and relaunched the Movement for the Parish group.

===== Brus =====
Results of the election for the Municipal Assembly of Brus:

Party	Votes	%	Seats
New Serbia–Milutin Jeličić Jutka	3,113	29.82	10
Let's Get Brus Moving–Tomislav Nikolić (Serbian Progressive Party)	2,272	21.76	7
Democratic Party–Boris Tadić	1,195	11.45	3
"Ivica Dačić"–Socialist Party of Serbia (SPS)–United Serbia (JS)	1,120	10.73	3
United Regions of Serbia–Mlađan Dinkić	920	8.81	2
Citizens' Group: "Transformation"–Goran Radojković "Rankov"	827	7.92	2
Democratic Party of Serbia–Vojislav Koštunica	714	6.84	2
Serbian Radical Party–Dr. Aleksandar Martinović and PUPS	280	2.68	–
Total	10,441	100.00	29
Valid votes	10,441	96.98	
Invalid/blank votes	325	3.02	
Total votes	10,766	100.00	
Registered voters/turnout	14,657	73.45	

A coalition government was formed after the election by the Serbian Progressive Party, the Socialist Party of Serbia, the United Regions of Serbia, the Democratic Party of Serbia, and the Transformation group. Zoran Obradović of the Socialist Party was chosen as mayor. He was removed from office in August 2013 and Slobodan Vidojević of the Progressive Party was chosen in his place.

In 2015, divisions in the ranks of the local Progressive organization allowed former mayor Milutin Jeličić of New Serbia to return to office in an alliance with the Democratic Party.

===== Ćićevac =====
Results of the election for the Municipal Assembly of Ćićevac:

Party	Votes	%	Seats
Democratic Party–Boris Tadić	2,387	38.71	12
Christian Democratic Party of Serbia–Dr. Zoran Milivojević Batke	878	14.24	4
United Regions of Serbia–Rade Miletić	755	12.24	4
Let's Get Ćićevac Moving–Tomislav Nikolić (Serbian Progressive Party, New Serbia, Strength of Serbia Movement, Movement of Socialists)	655	10.62	3
"Ivica Dačić"–Socialist Party of Serbia (SPS), United Serbia (JS)	374	6.07	1
Democratic Party of Serbia–Dr. Vojislav Koštunica	336	5.45	1
U-Turn–SPO–LDP–Slobodan Jovanović Lutan	247	4.01	–
PUPS–Party of United Pensioners of Serbia–Zoran Stolić	196	3.18	–
Citizens' Group: Dr. Katančević/Changes–Changes for the Municipality of Ćićevac	156	2.53	–
Serbian Radical Party–Dr. Aleksandar Martinović and PUPS	109	1.77	–
Social Democratic Alliance–Dušan Savić Roč	73	1.18	–
Total	6,166	100.00	25
Valid votes	6,166	97.46	
Invalid/blank votes	161	2.54	
Total votes	6,327	100.00	
Registered voters/turnout	8,076	78.34	

Incumbent mayor Zlatan Krkić of the Democratic Party was confirmed for another term in office after the election. Following a split in the Democratic Party in 2014, he joined the breakaway Social Democratic Party. In the autumn of 2015, he formed a local political organization called the Movement for the Preservation of the Municipality of Ćićevac.

===== Trstenik =====
Results of the election for the Municipal Assembly of Trstenik:

Party	Votes	%	Seats
United Regions of Serbia–Verica Kalanović	7,151	28.70	18
Choice for a Better Life–Boris Tadić (Democratic Party)	4,542	18.23	11
Let's Get Trstenik Moving–Tomislav Nikolić (Serbian Progressive Party, New Serbia, Strength of Serbia Movement, Movement of Socialists)	3,308	13.28	8
"Ivica Dačić–Socialist Party of Serbia (SPS)–Party of United Pensioners of Serbia (PUPS)"	2,707	10.86	6
Serbian Renewal Movement–Dr. Radovan Popović	2,413	9.68	6
Citizens' Groups (two different lists)	1,346	5.40	–
Democratic Party of Serbia–Vojislav Koštunica	1,233	4.95	–
Čedomir Jovanović–U-Turn (LDP–SDU)	924	3.71	–
Serbian Radical Party–Dr. Aleksandar Martinović	746	2.99	–
United Serbia–Dragan Marković "Palma"	546	2.19	–
Total	24,916	100.00	49
Valid votes	24,916	95.87	
Invalid/blank votes	1,074	4.13	
Total votes	25,990	100.00	
Registered voters/turnout	38,312	67.84	

Miroslav Aleksić of the United Regions of Serbia was chosen as mayor after the election, leading a coalition government that also included the Serbian Progressive Party, New Serbia, the Socialist Party of Serbia, and the Party of United Pensioners of Serbia. He left the United Regions of Serbia in 2014, and in February 2015 he became the leader of the newly formed People's Movement of Serbia.

===== Varvarin =====
Results of the election for the Municipal Assembly of Varvarin:

Party	Votes	%	Seats
Democratic Party–Socialist Party of Serbia–Citizens' Group: Vojkan Pavić–Dragoljub Stanojević	3,311	30.27	14
Serbian Renewal Movement–Zoran Milenković	3,053	27.91	13
Let's Get Varvarin Moving–Tomislav Nikolić (Serbian Progressive Party, New Serbia, Strength of Serbia Movement, Movement of Socialists)	1,167	10.67	5
Democratic Party of Serbia–Slavoljub Slavko Savić	906	8.28	4
United Regions of Serbia–Mlađan Dinkić	884	8.08	3
U-Turn–Miroslav Milošević Đak (LDP–Rich Serbia)	591	5.40	2
United Serbia–Dragan Marković Palma	298	2.72	–
United Peasant Party	245	2.24	–
Serbian Radical Party	215	1.97	–
Movement of Workers and Peasants	139	1.27	–
Party of United Pensioners of Serbia–Dojčin Ilić	131	1.20	–
Total	10,940	100.00	41
Valid votes	10,940	96.42	
Invalid/blank votes	406	3.58	
Total votes	11,346	100.00	
Registered voters/turnout	16,679	68.03	

Incumbent mayor Zoran Milenković of the Serbian Renewal Movement was confirmed for a new term in office after the election, leading a coalition that included the Serbian Progressive Party, the Democratic Party of Serbia, and the United Regions of Serbia. He served for the entirety of the term.

==== Raška District ====
Local elections were held in the two cities (Kraljevo and Novi Pazar) and the three other municipalities of the Raška District. The Serbian Progressive Party and its allies won and formed government in the predominantly Serb municipalities of Kraljevo and Vrnjačka Banja. The Socialist Party of Serbia won in the predominantly Serb municipality of Raška; in 2014, however, a member of the Progressives became the municipality's mayor. The Sandžak Democratic Party won in the predominantly Bosniak city of Novi Pazar, while the Party of Democratic Action of Sandžak won in Tutin, also a predominantly Bosniak community.

===== Kraljevo =====
Results of the election for the City Assembly of Kraljevo:

Party	Votes	%	Seats
Let's Get Kraljevo Moving–Tomislav Nikolić (Serbian Progressive Party, New Serbia, Strength of Serbia Movement, United Peasant Party)	12,013	20.74	16
Choice for a Better Life–Boris Tadić (Democratic Party)	9,384	16.20	13
Ivica Dačić–Socialist Party of Serbia, Party of United Pensioners of Serbia, United Serbia	8,051	13.90	11
Dveri–For the Life of Kraljevo	5,734	9.90	7
United Regions of Serbia–Jovan Nešović	4,806	8.30	6
Movement for Kraljevo–PULS Serbia–Dr. Ljubiša Jovašević	4,205	7.26	5
Democratic Party of Serbia–Vojislav Koštunica	3,438	5.94	4
U-Turn (Liberal Democratic Party, Serbian Renewal Movement, Rich Serbia)	3,365	5.81	4
Straightforward for Kraljevo–Social Democratic Alliance–Prim. Dr. Gordana Stojković	3,120	5.39	4
Coalition for My Kraljevo–Zoran Jovanović (Movement of Socialists, SMS Srpska Sloga, Green Ecological Party – Greens)	2,330	4.02	–
Serbian Radical Party–Dr. Aleksandar Martinović	1,480	2.55	–
Total	57,926	100.00	70
Valid votes	57,926	96.25	
Invalid/blank votes	2,259	3.75	
Total votes	60,185	100.00	
Registered voters/turnout	103,169	58.34	

Dragan Jovanović of the Serbian Progressive Party was chosen mayor after the election, leading an alliance that also included the Socialist Party of Serbia. He resigned in 2014 and was replaced by Tomislav Ilić of New Serbia, one of the parties in the broader alliance around the Progressives. In January 2016, Ilić joined the Progressives.

Marija Jevđić of United Serbia was elected to the assembly from the third position on the Socialist-led list.

===== Novi Pazar =====
Results of the election for the City Assembly of Novi Pazar:

Party	Votes	%	Seats
European Novi Pazar–Rasim Ljajić (Social Democratic Party of Serbia, Sandžak Democratic Party, Democratic Party, Party for Sandžak)	14,190	32.66	17
Party of Democratic Action of Sandžak–Dr. Sulejman Ugljanin	11,430	26.31	14
All Together–BDZ–Emir Elfić	8,638	19.88	10
Dr. Mirsad Ðerlek–Sandžak People's Party–United Regions of Serbia	3,328	7.66	4
Let's Get Novi Pazar Moving–Tomislav Nikolić (Serbian Progressive Party, New Serbia, Democratic Party of Serbia, Strength of Serbia Movement)	2,380	5.48	2
Together for Novi Pazar (Coalition: SRS–SPS–PUPS–JS)	1,915	4.41	–
Čedomir Jovanović–U-Turn, Liberal Democratic Party, Green Ecological Party – Greens, DPS	808	1.86	–
Dveri for the Life of Stari Ras–Novi Pazar	566	1.30	–
For Our Pazar–Bosniak People's Party–Dr. Isko Crnišanin	188	0.43	–
Total	43,443	100.00	47
Valid votes	43,443	98.41	
Invalid/blank votes	704	1.59	
Total votes	44,147	100.00	
Registered voters/turnout	79,312	55.66	

Incumbent mayor Meho Mahmutović of the Sandžak Democratic Party (SDP) was confirmed for a new term in office after the election. The government initially consisted of the European Novi Pazar alliance and the Party of Democratic Action of Sandžak (SDA). Ahmedin Škrijelj was elected from the second position on the SDA list and was chosen afterward as deputy mayor.

Amela Lukač Zoranić was elected from the third position on the All Together–Bosniak Democratic Union (BDZ) list.

The SDP–SDA alliance broke down in February 2013, and a new coalition was formed by the SDP's coalition, the Sandžak People's Party (SNP), and the Serbian Progressive Party (SNS). BDZ delegate Hedija Škrijelj also broke party ranks to support the new administration. Ahmedin Škrijelj's term as deputy mayor ended on 21 February 2013.

===== Raška =====
Results of the election for the City Assembly of Raška:

Party	Votes	%	Seats
Ivica Dačić–"Socialist Party of Serbia (SPS), Party of United Pensioners of Serbia (PUPS)", Dr. Bojan Milovanović	3,826	26.34	10
Citizens' Group: Victory	1,953	13.44	5
Democratic Party of Serbia–Vojislav Koštunica	1,712	11.78	4
Serbian Radical Party–Dr. Aleksandar Martinović	1,658	11.41	4
Let's Get Raška Moving–Tomislav Nikolić (Serbian Progressive Party, New Serbia, Strength of Serbia Movement)	1,642	11.30	4
Democratic Party–Boris Tadić	1,471	10.13	4
United Serbia–Dragan Marković Palma	792	5.45	2
United Regions of Serbia	777	5.35	2
Čedomir Jovanović–U-Turn Liberal Democratic Party–Serbian Renewal Movement–Green Ecological Party – Greens	493	3.39	–
Social Democratic Party of Serbia, Social Democratic Alliance–Golub Pendić	203	1.40	–
Total	14,527	100.00	35
Valid votes	14,527	96.96	
Invalid/blank votes	456	3.04	
Total votes	14,983	100.00	
Registered voters/turnout	21,169	70.78	

Jovan Čorbić of the Socialist Party of Serbia was chosen as mayor after the election. He was replaced by Ignjat Rakitić of the Serbian Progressive Party in June 2014.

===== Tutin =====
Results of the election for the Municipal Assembly of Tutin:

Party	Votes	%	Seats
SDA Sandžak–Dr. Sulejman Ugljanin	8,971	55.29	21
All Together–BDZ–Emir Elfić	3,879	23.91	9
Coalition "Together for Tutin"–URS–LDP–SDP–DS	2,586	15.94	6
Sandžak People's Party–Dr. Mirsad Ðerlek	526	3.24	1
For Our Tutin–BNS	264	1.63	–
Total	16,226	100.00	37
Valid votes	16,226	98.88	
Invalid/blank votes	183	1.12	
Total votes	16,409	100.00	
Registered voters/turnout	28,147	58.30	

Šemsudin Kučević of the Party of Democratic Action of Sandžak, who had previously served as mayor from 1996 to 2008, was chosen for another term in office following the election.

Incumbent mayor Bajro Gegić was elected from the second position on the Party of Democratic Action of Sandžak list. Future parliamentarian Zaim Redžepović was elected from the second position on the Bosniak Democratic Union list.

===== Vrnjačka Banja =====
Results of the election for the Municipal Assembly of Vrnjačka Banja:

Party	Votes	%	Seats
Let's Get Vrnjačka Banja Moving–Tomislav Nikolić (Serbian Progressive Party, New Serbia, Strength of Serbia Movement)	3,682	22.47	9
Democratic Party–Boris Tadić	3,391	20.70	8
Socialist Party of Serbia	1,601	9.77	4
United Serbia–Dragan Marković Palma	1,507	9.20	3
Citizens' Group: Banja Is the Law–Rade Simić	1,321	8.06	3
Democratic Party of Serbia–Dr. Vojislav Koštunica	1,179	7.20	2
United Regions of Serbia–Strong Serbia, Strong Vrnjačka Banja	897	5.48	2
Social Democratic Party of Serbia	526	3.21	–
Movement of Socialists Nikola Trifunović Borinac	506	3.09	–
U-Turn for Vrnjačka Banja–Serbian Renewal Movement, Liberal Democratic Party	441	2.69	–
Citizen's Group: Dveri for the Life of Vrnjačka Banja	436	2.66	–
Citizen's Group: Front for Social Justice	278	1.70	–
Dr. Jovan Krkobabić–Party of United Pensioners of Serbia-PUPS	252	1.54	–
Serbian Radical Party–Dr. Aleksandar Martinović	196	1.20	–
Citizens' Group: Banja Is Loved– Dunjić Dušan	170	1.04	–
Total	16,383	100.00	31
Valid votes	16,383	96.88	
Invalid/blank votes	527	3.12	
Total votes	16,910	100.00	
Registered voters/turnout	23,667	71.45	

Boban Đurović of the Serbian Progressive Party was chosen as mayor in August 2012, leading a coalition administration that also included the Socialist Party of Serbia, the United Regions of Serbia, United Serbia, and the Democratic Party of Serbia.

==== Šumadija District ====
Local elections were held in the one city (Kragujevac) and five of the six other municipalities of the Šumadija District. The exception was Aranđelovac, where the last election had been held in 2010.

Together for Šumadija leader Veroljub Stevanović affiliated with the United Regions of Serbia in this election and won a plurality victory in Kragujevac. He remained in office for two years before a shift in local political alliances brought the Serbian Progressive Party to power.

The Democratic Party won a majority in Batočina and held power in that municipality for the term that followed. It also won a plurality victory in Lapovo and, while it narrowly lost the election to the Socialist Party of Serbia, also formed government in Knić; in both of these jurisdictions, the government proved unstable and the party fell from power.

An independent list aligned with United Regions of Serbia won in Rača, while incumbent mayor Dragan Jovanović led a coalition led by New Serbia to a majority victory in Topola.

===== Kragujevac =====
Results of the election for the City Assembly of Kragujevac:

Party	Votes	%	Seats
Veroljub Verko Stevanović Together for Kragujevac United Regions of Serbia (Together for Šumadija, G17 Plus)	34,319	38.78	37
Let's Get Kragujevac Moving–Tomislav Nikolić (Serbian Progressive Party, New Serbia, Strength of Serbia Movement, Movement of Socialists)	16,694	18.86	18
Choice for a Better Life–Boris Tadić (Democratic Party, Social Democratic Party of Serbia)	11,676	13.19	12
Ivica Dačić–Socialist Party of Serbia (SPS), Party of United Pensioners of Serbia (PUPS), United Serbia (JS)–Prof. Dr. Slavica Đukić Dejanović	9,193	10.39	10
Čedomir Jovanović–U-Turn (LDP, SPO, SDU)	5,149	5.82	5
Democratic Party of Serbia–Dr. Vojislav Koštunica	4,864	5.50	5
Dveri For the Life of Serbia	2,948	3.33	–
Serbian Radical Party–Dr. Aleksandar Martinović	2,717	3.07	–
Social Democratic Alliance–Social Democratic Movement Dragutin Stanojlović Baja	696	0.79	–
New Social Democratic Party of Serbia–Dušan Janjić	247	0.28	–
Total	88,503	100.00	87
Valid votes	88,503	96.14	
Invalid/blank votes	3,553	3.86	
Total votes	92,056	100.00	
Registered voters/turnout	152,725	60.28	

Incumbent mayor Veroljub Stevanović of Together for Šumadija was confirmed for another term in office after the election, with support from the Liberal Democratic Party, the Serbian Renewal Movement, the Socialist Party of Serbia, United Serbia, the Democratic Party of Serbia, and smaller parties represented in the assembly. Over the next two years, Stevanović's allies left the government; when the Serbian Renewal Movement switched its affiliation in October 2014, the Serbian Progressive Party was able to form a new city administration with Radomir Nikolić as mayor.

Future parliamentarian Slađana Radisavljević was elected on the Democratic Party of Serbia list. She resigned her seat on 7 December 2012.

Parliamentarian Nataša Jovanović appeared in the lead position on the Serbian Radical Party's list.

===== Aranđelovac =====
There was no election for the Municipal Assembly of Aranđelovac in 2012. The previous election had taken place in 2010, and the next took place in 2014.

===== Batočina =====
Results of the election for the Municipal Assembly of Batočina:

Party	Votes	%	Seats
Democratic Party–Boris Tadić	3,283	43.54	19
Let's Get Batočina Moving–Tomislav Nikolić (Serbian Progressive Party, New Serbia, Movement of Socialists)	1,062	14.08	6
Zajedno–Veroljub Verko Stevanović (Together for Šumadija, SPO, LDP)	1,035	13.72	5
Socialist Party of Serbia–Ivica Dačić	886	11.75	5
United Regions of Serbia–Zoran Jevtić	361	4.79	–
Party of United Pensioners of Serbia–United Serbia	347	4.60	–
Democratic Party of Serbia–Dr. Vojislav Koštunica	336	4.46	–
Serbian Radical Party–Dr. Aleksandar Martinović	231	3.06	–
Total	7,541	100.00	35
Valid votes	7,541	96.67	
Invalid/blank votes	260	3.33	
Total votes	7,801	100.00	
Registered voters/turnout	10,260	76.03	

Incumbent mayor Radiša Milošević of the Democratic Party was confirmed for another term in office after the election.

===== Knić =====
Results of the election for the Municipal Assembly of Knić:

Party	Votes	%	Seats
Ivica Dačić–Socialist Party of Serbia (SPS)	1,891	23.91	9
Democratic Party–Boris Tadić	1,702	21.52	8
Tomislav Nikolić–Serbian Progressive Party	884	11.18	4
United Regions of Serbia–Milić Milović	759	9.60	3
Together for Šumadija–SPO	619	7.83	3
New Serbia–Democratic Party of Serbia–Velimir Ilić–Vojislav Koštunica	564	7.13	2
U-Turn for Knić and Gruža–Prof. Dr. Zoran Todorović–Nikola Čamperević (Liberal Democratic Party, Social Democratic Union)	505	6.39	2
Dragan Marković Palma–United Serbia	451	5.70	2
Strength of Serbia Movement–Tomislav Kostić	214	2.71	–
Borivoje Ilić–Dveri Knić	188	2.38	–
Serbian Radical Party–Dr. Aleksandar Martinović	131	1.66	–
Total	7,908	100.00	33
Valid votes	7,908	96.35	
Invalid/blank votes	300	3.65	
Total votes	8,208	100.00	
Registered voters/turnout	11,869	69.15	

Incumbent mayor Borislav Busarac of the Democratic Party was confirmed for another term in office after the election. He was removed from office on 30 May 2013 and was replaced by Dragana Jovanović of the Socialist Party. Jovanović was in turn removed in February 2014, and Ljubomir Đurđević of United Serbia was chosen as mayor the following month in a new alliance that included the Democratic Party.

===== Lapovo =====
Results of the election for the Municipal Assembly of Lapovo:

Party	Votes	%	Seats
Democratic Party–Boris Tadić	1,105	23.54	8
All for Lapovo–SPO–Dragan Zlatković	1,073	22.86	8
Citizens' Group: For the Life of Lapovo	1,000	21.30	7
Let's Get Lapovo Moving–Tomislav Nikolić (Serbian Progressive Party, Strength of Serbia Movement)	521	11.10	4
Ivica Dačić–Socialist Party of Serbia	302	6.43	2
Serbian Radical Party–Dr. Aleksandar Martinović	212	4.52	–
United Regions of Serbia–Mika Solunac (G17 Plus, I Live for Krajina)	178	3.79	–
Čedomir Jovanović–U-Turn–Ivan Petrović (Liberal Democratic Party, Social Democratic Union)	172	3.66	–
Party of United Pensioners of Serbia and United Serbia (Dr. Jovan Krkobabić and Dragan Marković PALMA)	131	2.79	–
Total	4,694	100.00	29
Valid votes	4,694	97.16	
Invalid/blank votes	137	2.84	
Total votes	4,831	100.00	
Registered voters/turnout	7,057	68.46	

Nebojša Miletić of the Democratic Party was chosen as mayor after the election. He was replaced in June 2014 by Jasna Jovanović of the "For the Life of Lapovo" list. Jovanović was in turn replaced by Nebojša Tasić of the Progressive Party in June 2015.

===== Rača =====
Results of the election for the Municipal Assembly of Rača:

Party	Votes	%	Seats
Citizens' Group: United Regions–Dragana Živanović	2,286	31.96	12
Democratic Party–Boris Tadić	2,217	30.99	11
Let's Get Rača Moving–Tomislav Nikolić (Serbian Progressive Party)	830	11.60	4
Ivica Dačić–Socialist Party of Serbia	749	10.47	4
Serbian Renewal Movement–Slobodan Prešić Mirza	287	4.01	–
For Rača, You Know Why–Democratic Party of Serbia–Movement of Socialists	256	3.58	–
Čedomir Jovanović–U-Turn (Liberal Democratic Party, Rich Serbia)	219	3.06	–
Party of United Pensioners of Serbia (PUP)–United Serbia (JS)	182	2.54	–
Serbian Radical Party–Dr. Aleksandar Martinović	127	1.78	–
Total	7,153	100.00	31
Valid votes	7,153	97.03	
Invalid/blank votes	219	2.97	
Total votes	7,372	100.00	
Registered voters/turnout	10,161	72.55	

Incumbent mayor Dragana Živanović of United Regions was confirmed for another term in office after the election. She was replaced in February 2015 by Dragan Stevanović of the Progressive Party.

===== Topola =====
Results of the election for the Municipal Assembly of Topola:

Party	Votes	%	Seats
Dragan Jovanović–New Serbia–Democratic Party of Serbia–Party of United Pensioners of Serbia	7,372	57.33	26
Choice for a Better Topola (DS, Citizens' Group: Vladimir Radojković, SDP Serbia–Gordan Marković)	1,798	13.98	6
Let's Get Topola Moving–Tomislav Nikolić (Serbian Progressive Party, Strength of Serbia Movement, Coalition of Refugee Associations in the Republic of Serbia)	1,132	8.80	4
Ivica Dačić–Socialist Party of Serbia (SPS), Dragan Marković Palma–United Serbia (JS), Žarko Jovanović	1,012	7.87	3
"Together for Šumadija", Dr. Jovica Žikić	677	5.26	2
Čedomir Jovanović–U-Turn (LDP, SPO)	516	4.01	–
Serbian Radical Party–Dr. Aleksandar Martinović	281	2.19	–
Citizens' Group: Topola Movement	72	0.56	–
Total	12,860	100.00	41
Valid votes	12,860	97.11	
Invalid/blank votes	383	2.89	
Total votes	13,243	100.00	
Registered voters/turnout	19,365	68.39	

Incumbent mayor Dragan Jovanović of New Serbia was confirmed for another term in office after the election. He resigned in August 2014 after being elected to the national assembly, as he could not hold a dual mandate as a parliamentarian and a member of the local executive. Jovanović instead became president (i.e., speaker) of the local assembly and was replaced as mayor by Dragan Živanović, also of New Serbia.

==== Zlatibor District ====
Local elections were held in the one city (i.e., Užice) and eight of the nine municipalities of the Zlatibor District. The exception was Kosjerić, where the previous local election had taken place in 2009.

The Democratic Party won in Užice and also in Požega, and initially led a coalition government in both jurisdictions. In both cases, the party lost power to the Serbian Progressive Party in the term that followed.

The Progressives won in Arilje and Nova Varoš and formed government in both municipalities (although they briefly lost power in the former community in 2015). In Priboj, the Progressives led a grand coalition government that also included several other parties. The Serbian Radical Party won a rare victory in Bajina Bašta and led a local coalition government until 2014, at which time the Progressives became the dominant power in the local administration.

Incumbent mayor Milan Stamatović led the Democratic Party of Serbia to a majority victory in Čajetina. The Sandžak Democratic Party won the election in Prijepolje and led a coalition government afterward, while the Party of Democratic Action of Sandžak did the same in Sjenica.

===== Užice =====
Results of the election for the City Assembly of Užice:

Party	Votes	%	Seats
Choice for a Better Life–Boris Tadić (Democratic Party)	10,796	28.50	22
Let's Get Užice Moving–Tomislav Nikolić (Serbian Progressive Party, New Serbia, Strength of Serbia Movement-BK)	7,919	20.90	16
Ivica Dačić–"Socialist Party of Serbia (SPS), Party of United Pensioners of Serbia (PUPS), United Serbia (JS)"	5,319	14.04	11
Smart Choice!–Tihomir Petković Tihi, Democratic Party of Serbia	3,747	9.89	7
United Regions of Serbia–Branislav Mitrović	3,623	9.56	7
Čedomir Jovanović–U-Turn (Liberal Democratic Party, Social Democratic Union)	2,253	5.95	4
Dveri For the Life of Užice	1,899	5.01	–
Movement of Workers and Peasants	1,373	3.62	–
Serbian Radical Party–Dr. Aleksandar Martinović	958	2.53	–
Total	37,887	100.00	67
Valid votes	37,887	96.09	
Invalid/blank votes	1,543	3.91	
Total votes	39,430	100.00	
Registered voters/turnout	69,517	56.72	

The Dveri list did not receive five per cent of the total votes cast and so fell below the electoral threshold.

Incumbent mayor Jovan Marković of the Democratic Party was initially confirmed for another term in office after the election. The city's political alliances subsequently changed, and in October 2012 Marković was succeeded by Saša Milošević of the Serbian Progressive Party Milošević in turn resigned in August 2014 and was replaced by Tihomir Petković, who had been elected on the list of the Democratic Party of Serbia but later joined the Progressive Party.

===== Arilje =====
Results of the election for the Municipal Assembly of Arilje:

Party	Votes	%	Seats
Let's Get Arilje Moving–Tomislav Nikolić–Serbian Progressive Party–New Serbia–Democratic Party of Serbia	2,627	25.61	9
Democratic Party–Boris Tadić	2,132	20.79	7
Movement of Workers and Peasants	1,697	16.55	6
Ivica Dačić–"Socialist Party of Serbia (SPS)–Party of United Pensioners of Serbia (PUPS)–Prof. Dr. Svetislav Petrović	1,228	11.97	4
Čedomir Jovanović–U-Turn for Arilje (SPO, LDP)	861	8.40	3
Serbian Radical Party–Dr. Aleksandar Martinović	833	8.12	3
Dveri For the Life of Serbia–Dveri Arilje	661	6.45	2
Social Democratic Party of Serbia–Rasim Ljajić	217	2.12	–
Total	10,256	100.00	34
Valid votes	10,256	96.31	
Invalid/blank votes	393	3.69	
Total votes	10,649	100.00	
Registered voters/turnout	16,044	66.37	

Zoran Todorović of the Serbian Progressive Party was chosen as mayor after the election.

In June 2015, a coalition of the Serbian Radical Party, the Movement of Workers and Peasants, and Dveri came to power with outside support from the Democratic Party and the Liberal Democratic Party. Milan Nikolić of the Radicals was chosen as mayor. The Progressives returned to power in December 2015, and Todorović was returned to the mayor's office.

===== Bajina Bašta =====
Results of the election for the Municipal Assembly of Bajina Bašta:

Party	Votes	%	Seats
Serbian Radical Party	2,834	21.82	11
Socialist Party of Serbia–Party of United Pensioners of Serbia–United Serbia	2,600	20.02	10
Serbian Progressive Party	1,884	14.51	7
Democratic Party	1,654	12.74	6
Democratic Party of Serbia	1,502	11.57	6
United Regions of Serbia	955	7.35	3
U-Turn (Liberal Democratic Party–Serbian Renewal Movement)	706	5.44	2
Citizens' Group: Survival	326	2.51	–
Dveri	280	2.16	–
Rich Serbia–Aleksandar Aksentijević (Rich Serbia, Movement of Farmers and Businessmen)	246	1.89	–
Total	12,987	100.00	45
Valid votes	12,987	95.84	
Invalid/blank votes	564	4.16	
Total votes	13,551	100.00	
Registered voters/turnout	22,965	59.01	

Incumbent mayor Zlatan Jovanović of the Serbian Radical Party was confirmed for another term in office after the election, leading a somewhat unusual coalition government with the Democratic Party and the Democratic Party of Serbia. The Democratic Party subsequently left the government and was replaced by the Serbian Progressive Party.

Jovanović stood down as mayor in early 2014 and was succeeded by Radomir Filipović of the Progressive Party.

===== Čajetina =====
Results of the election for the Municipal Assembly of Čajetina:

Party	Votes	%	Seats
Milan Stamatović–Democratic Party of Serbia	4,568	48.09	16
List "For a Better Čajetina"–DS–Citizens' Group: "Zlatiborski pogled"–SPO	2,346	24.70	8
"Let's Get Čajetina Moving"–Serbian Progressive Party–Tomislav Nikolić	1,160	12.21	4
"Ivica Dačić–Socialist Party of Serbia" (SPS)	840	8.84	3
Party of United Pensioners of Serbia–PUPS–Slobodan Jeremić	324	3.41	–
United Regions of Serbia–Mlađan Dinkić	159	1.67	–
Čedomir Jovanović–U-Turn (Liberal Democratic Party)	102	1.07	–
Total	9,499	100.00	31
Valid votes	9,499	97.83	
Invalid/blank votes	211	2.17	
Total votes	9,710	100.00	
Registered voters/turnout	12,850	75.56	

Incumbent mayor Milan Stamatović of the Democratic Party of Serbia was confirmed for another term in office after the election. He left that party in 2014 and was a co-founder of the Serbian People's Party in the same year.

Bojana Božanić of the Democratic Party of Serbia was elected to the assembly from the third position on the DSS's list. She resigned shortly thereafter to serve a second term as an assistant to Stamatović.

===== Kosjerić =====
There was no municipal election in Kosjerić in 2012. The previous election had taken place in 2009, and the next election took place in 2013.

===== Nova Varoš =====
Results of the election for the Municipal Assembly of Nova Varoš:

Party	Votes	%	Seats
Let's Get Nova Varoš Moving–Tomislav Nikolić–Serbian Progressive Party–Democratic Party of Serbia	2,743	25.75	8
Democratic Party–Boris Tadić	2,108	19.79	6
Ivica Dačić–Socialist Party of Serbia, Party of United Pensioners of Serbia, and United Serbia	1,662	15.60	5
Citizens' Group: Citizens' Group and Businessmen "New People for Nova Varoš"–Radosav Rade Vasiljević	1,280	12.02	3
New Serbia Velimir Ilić	858	8.05	2
United Regions of Serbia–Nenad Todorović	791	7.43	2
Sandžak Democratic Party–Alija Mujagić	334	3.14	1
Serbian Radical Party Dr. Aleksandar Martinović	312	2.93	–
Citizens' Group: "Association of Citizens UNEMPLOYED" Prof. Milojko Popović	237	2.22	–
Čedomir Jovanović–U-Turn–LDP–SPO)	203	1.91	–
All Together–Bosniak Democratic Union–Emir Elfić	125	1.17	–
Total	10,653	100.00	27
Valid votes	10,653	97.62	
Invalid/blank votes	260	2.38	
Total votes	10,913	100.00	
Registered voters/turnout	14,825	73.61	

Dimitrije Paunović of the Serbian Progressive Party was chosen as mayor after the election. He resigned on 6 January 2016 after being appointed as commissioner of the Zlatibor District. Ivan Mladenović subsequently oversaw an interim administration pending new elections.

===== Požega =====
Results of the election for the Municipal Assembly of Požega:

Party	Votes	%	Seats
Choice for a Better Life–Boris Tadić (Democratic Party)	3,622	25.63	15
Let's Get Požega Moving–Tomislav Nikolić (Serbian Progressive Party, New Serbia, and Strength of Serbia Movement)	2,938	20.79	12
Ivica Dačić–Socialist Party of Serbia (SPS), Party of United Pensioners of Serbia (PUPS), and United Serbia (JS)	2,356	16.67	9
United Regions of Serbia for Požega–Đorđe Stevanović	1,365	9.66	5
Democratic Party of Serbia Vojislav Koštunica	1,013	7.17	4
Citizens' Group: Dveri–Požega	962	6.81	4
Čedomir Jovanović–U-Turn–LDP–SDU)	890	6.30	3
Serbian Radical Party Dr. Aleksandar Martinović	599	4.24	–
Citizens' Group: Požega Ecological Movement	387	2.74	–
Total	14,132	100.00	52
Valid votes	14,132	95.79	
Invalid/blank votes	621	4.21	
Total votes	14,753	100.00	
Registered voters/turnout	25,420	58.04	

Incumbent mayor Milovan Mićović of the Democratic Party was confirmed for another term in office after the election. The government changed in October 2015, and Milan Božić of the Serbian Progressive Party became mayor.

===== Priboj =====
Results of the election for the Municipal Assembly of Priboj:

Party	Votes	%	Seats
Democratic Party of Serbia–Dragomir Minić Jole	2,413	16.17	7
Let's Get Priboj Moving–Tomislav Nikolić–Serbian Progressive Party	2,320	15.55	7
"Better for Priboj" Dr. Jasminko Toskić and Kenan Hajdarević (SDP and LDP)	2,205	14.77	7
Ivica Dačić–Socialist Party of Serbia (SPS), Party of United Pensioners of Serbia (PUPS)	1,713	11.48	5
Choice for a Better Life–Boris Tadić (Democratic Party)	1,663	11.14	5
New Serbia–Velimir Ilić	1,114	7.46	3
Citizens' Group: Movement for Priboj–Ćetković Dr. Dragan Gaga	1,062	7.12	3
Party of Democratic Action of Sandžak–Dr. Sulejman Ugljanin	948	6.35	3
United Regions of Serbia–Mlađan Dinkić	574	3.85	–
All Together BDZ Emir Elfić	545	3.65	1
Serbian Radical Party–Dr. Aleksandar Martinović	367	2.46	–
Total	14,924	100.00	41
Valid votes	14,924	97.57	
Invalid/blank votes	371	2.43	
Total votes	15,295	100.00	
Registered voters/turnout	28,286	54.07	

Incumbent mayor Lazar Rvović of the Serbian Progressive Party was confirmed for another term in office after the election, leading a grand coalition government that also included the Democratic Party, the Serbian Renewal Movement, the Sandžak Democratic Party, the Socialist Party of Serbia, and New Serbia.

Future parliamentarian Dijana Radović appeared in the sixth position on the Socialist list; she was not immediately elected but received a mandate on 19 July 2012 as the replacement for another party member.

===== Prijepolje =====
Results of the election for the Municipal Assembly of Prijepolje:

Party	Votes	%	Seats
Sandžak Democratic Party–Social Democratic Party of Serbia–Rasim Ljajić	3,571	16.79	13
DPS Dr. Zulkefil Bato Sadović (Democratic Party of the Sandžak)	2,623	12.33	10
Let's Get Serbia Moving–Let's Get Prijepolje Moving–Tomislav Nikolić–Serbian Progressive Party	2,553	12.00	10
Democratic Party (DS)–Socialist Party of Serbia (SPS)–Best for Prijepolje	2,385	11.21	9
Serbian List for Prijepolje–Serbian Radical Party–Democratic Party of Serbia	2,297	10.80	8
Party of Democratic Action of Sandžak–Dr. Sulejman Ugljanin	1,784	8.39	6
All Together BDZ Emir Elfić	1,451	6.82	5
Dveri for the Life of Prijepolje	1,035	4.87	–
Čedomir Jovanović–Liberal Democratic Party	1,015	4.77	–
New Serbia–Milan Gačević	906	4.26	–
Party of United Pensioners of Serbia Dr. Jovan Krkobabić	696	3.27	–
United Regions of Serbia–Za Jako Prijepolje–Dr. Branko Gojaković	605	2.84	–
Citizens Group: The Only Choice for Prijepolje Werner Tschedernig	217	1.02	–
Movement of Workers and Peasants	134	0.63	–
Total	21,272	100.00	61
Valid votes	21,272	97.71	
Invalid/blank votes	498	2.29	
Total votes	21,770	100.00	
Registered voters/turnout	34,649	62.83	

Emir Hašimbegović of the Sandžak Democratic Party was chosen as mayor after the election.

Outgoing parliamentarian Slobodan Gojković of the Democratic Party was re-elected to the assembly from the fifth position on the Best for Prijepolje list. He left the DS later in the term and became the leader of the municipal board for the breakaway Together for Serbia party.

Sabira Hadžiavdić was elected from the third position on the All Together list.

===== Sjenica =====
Results of the election for the Municipal Assembly of Sjenica:

Party	Votes	%	Seats
Party of Democratic Action of Sandžak–Dr. Sulejman Ugljanin	3,621	24.21	12
All Together BDZ Emir Elfić	3,243	21.68	10
For Sjenica SDP, DS, LDP, SDPS–Muriz Turković	2,394	16.00	8
SPS–PUPS Ivica Dačić	1,264	8.45	4
Citizens' Group: Independent Party of Democratic Action for Sjenica–Nusret Nuhović	1,023	6.84	3
United Regions of Serbia–Dr. Esad Zornić	775	5.18	2
Sandžak People's Party–Dr. Mirsad Ðerlek	672	4.49	–
Serbian Progressive Party–Tomislav Nikolić	662	4.43	–
Together–Democratic Party of Serbia–Serbian Radical Party	631	4.22	–
New Serbia–Momir Kovačević	363	2.43	–
Sandžak People's Movement–Džemail Suljević	228	1.52	–
Communist Party–Josip Broz	82	0.55	–
Total	14,958	100.00	39
Valid votes	14,958	98.11	
Invalid/blank votes	288	1.89	
Total votes	15,246	100.00	
Registered voters/turnout	25,258	60.36	

Hazbo Mujović of the Party of Democratic Action of Sandžak was chosen as mayor after the election, leading a coalition administration that also included the Sandžak Democratic Party's alliance, the Socialist Party of Serbia's alliance, and the United Regions of Serbia. Muriz Turković of the Sandžak Democratic Party was appointed as deputy mayor. The Sandžak Democratic Party was excluded from government in November 2014, and Minela Kalender of the Party of Democratic Action, who had been elected to the municipal assembly in 2012, was named as deputy mayor in Turković's place.

=== Southern and Eastern Serbia ===
==== Jablanica District ====
===== Leskovac =====
Party	Votes	%	Seats
Democratic Party	20,793	25.44	22
Serbian Progressive Party coalition	16,925	20.71	18
Socialist Party of Serbia coalition	11,895	14.55	12
United Regions of Serbia	10,859	13.28	11
United Serbia	4,687	5.73	4
Coalition NS-ZEP-Greens	4,606	5.63	4
Democratic Party of Serbia	4,275	5.23	4
Serbian Radical Party	2,804	3.43	–
Liberal Democratic Party coalition	2,336	2.86	–
Dveri	1,834	2.24	–
Group of citizens - total	727	0.89	–
Total	81,741	100.00	75
Valid votes	81,741	96.92	
Invalid/blank votes	2,598	3.08	
Total votes	84,339	100.00	
Registered voters/turnout	123,205	68.45	

==== Nišava District ====
Local elections were held for the City Assembly of Niš, the assemblies in all five of Niš's constituent municipalities, and the assemblies in all six of the Nišava District's other municipalities.

The Progressive Party formed coalition governments with the Socialist Party and the United Regions of Serbia shortly after the election in the City of Niš, four of the city's five municipalities (the exception being Niška Banja), and Aleksinac. The Progressive Party's alliance won the popular vote in all of these jurisdictions except for Medijana, where the Democratic Party placed first.

The situation was different in the district's smaller municipalities. Local incumbent mayors led the Socialist Party to victory in Gadžin Han, New Serbia to victory in Ražanj, the United Regions of Serbia to victory to Doljevac, and the United Peasant Party to victory in Svrljig. The Socialists also won the popular vote in Merošina and initially formed a coalition government with the Democratic Party and the United Regions of Serbia. This alliance fell apart in December 2012, and a new coalition of the Progressive Party and the United Regions of Serbia came to power. The local Progressive organization subsequently became divided, leading to instability in the local government.

In Niška Banja, the Democratic Party of Serbia won the popular vote and formed a coalition government afterwards; the incumbent mayor later left the Democratic Party of Serbia for the United Regions of Serbia, and, after that party's dissolution, joined the Serbian People's Party.

===== Niš =====
Results of the election for the City Assembly of Niš:

Party	Votes	%	Seats
Let's Get Niš Moving–Tomislav Nikolić (Serbian Progressive Party, New Serbia, Strength of Serbia Movement, Movement of Socialists)	26,577	22.23	17
Choice for a Better Life–Boris Tadić (Democratic Party)	23,295	19.48	15
United Regions of Serbia–Branislav Jovanović	18,086	15.12	11
Ivica Dačić–"Socialist Party of Serbia (SPS), Party of United Pensioners of Serbia (PUPS), United Serbia (JS)	16,554	13.84	10
Democratic Party of Serbia–Milan Lapčević	7,710	6.45	4
Čedomir Jovanović–U-Turn–LDP–SPO–Rich Serbia–Zaplanje My Home–Movement for Niš	6,984	5.84	4
Dveri–For the Life of Niš	5,519	4.62	–
Serbian Radical Party–Dr. Aleksandar Martinović	4,903	4.10	–
Reformist Party–Prof. Dr. Milan Višnjić	4,190	3.50	–
Citizens' Group: Better	1,905	1.59	–
Movement of Workers and Peasants	1,582	1.32	–
Communist Party–Josip Broz	1,098	0.92	–
Roma Unity Party	734	0.61	–
United Serbian Movement	440	0.37	–
Total	119,577	100.00	61
Valid votes	119,577	96.02	
Invalid/blank votes	4,951	3.98	
Total votes	124,528	100.00	
Registered voters/turnout	230,961	53.92	

Zoran Perišić of the Progressive Party was chosen as mayor after the election. The city government was initially formed by the Progressives, the Socialists, and the United Regions of Serbia.

Momir Stojanović was elected to the assembly from the fourth position on the Progressive Party's list.

====== Crveni Krst ======
Results of the election for the Municipal Assembly of Crveni Krst:

Party	Votes	%	Seats
Let's Get Crveni Krst Moving–Tomislav Nikolić (Serbian Progressive Party, Strength of Serbia Movement, Movement of Socialists)	3,526	25.25	7
United Regions of Serbia	3,115	22.31	6
Socialist Party of Serbia (SPS), Party of United Pensioners of Serbia (PUPS), United Serbia (JS)	1,818	13.02	3
Serbian Radical Party	1,291	9.25	2
Democratic Party	945	6.77	2
Democratic Party of Serbia	714	5.11	1
New Serbia	561	4.02	–
U-Turn–LDP–SPO–Rich Serbia–Zaplanje My Home–Movement for Niš	489	3.50	–
Reformist Party	431	3.09	–
Dveri for the Life of Crveni Krst	423	3.03	–
Roma Unity Party	279	2.00	–
United Serbian Movement	206	1.48	–
Citizens' Group	104	0.74	–
Movement for the Development of Serbia	61	0.44	–
Total	13,963	100.00	21
Valid votes	13,963	96.97	
Invalid/blank votes	436	3.03	
Total votes	14,399	100.00	
Registered voters/turnout	29,998	48.00	

Darko Bulatović of the Progressive Party was chosen as mayor after the election, with the votes of nineteen delegates. The local government was formed by the Progressives, the United Regions of Serbia, and the Socialists. Bulatović resigned as mayor in May 2014 and was replaced by Miroslav Milutinović, a former Socialist who crossed over to the Progressives.

====== Medijana ======
Results of the election for the Municipal Assembly of Medijana:

Party	Votes	%	Seats
Democratic Party	12,489	27.89	9
Let's Get Medijana Moving–Tomislav Nikolić (Serbian Progressive Party)	8,291	18.52	6
Socialist Party of Serbia (SPS), Party of United Pensioners of Serbia (PUPS), United Serbia (JS)	6,555	14.64	4
United Regions of Serbia (G17 Plus)	4,891	10.92	3
U-Turn–LDP–SPO–Rich Serbia	3,467	7.74	2
Democratic Party of Serbia	2,933	6.55	2
Dveri for the Life of Medijana	2,474	5.53	1
Serbian Radical Party	1,282	2.86	–
Reformist Party	1,228	2.74	–
Movement of Workers and Peasants	727	1.62	–
Coalition: United Serbian Movement–Movement of Veterans	285	0.64	–
Roma Democratic League	152	0.34	–
Total	44,774	100.00	27
Valid votes	44,774	95.49	
Invalid/blank votes	2,117	4.51	
Total votes	46,891	100.00	
Registered voters/turnout	81,220	57.73	

Nebojša Krstić of the United Regions of Serbia was chosen as mayor after the election, with the support of sixteen delegates. The government consisted of the Progressives, the Socialists, the United Regions of Serbia, and the Democratic Party of Serbia. Krstić was replaced as mayor by Zoran Stojanović of the Progressive Party in August 2014.

====== Niška Banja ======
Results of the election for the Municipal Assembly of Niška Banja:

Party	Votes	%	Seats
Let's Move Forward–Zoran Vidanović (Democratic Party of Serbia)	2,379	28.84	7
Choice for a Better Life–Boris Tadić (Democratic Party)	1,264	15.32	4
United Regions of Serbia–Branislav Jovanović	937	11.36	3
Let's Get Niška Banja Moving–Tomislav Nikolić (Serbian Progressive Party, New Serbia, Strength of Serbia Movement)	923	11.19	2
Ivica Dačić–Socialist Party of Serbia	715	8.67	2
Reformist Party–Prof. Dr. Milan Višnjić	466	5.65	1
"United Serbia"	423	5.13	–
U-Turn–LDP–SPO–Rich Serbia–Zaplanje My Home–Movement for Niš	310	3.76	–
Serbian Radical Party	304	3.68	–
Movement of Veterans	210	2.55	–
Movement for Niška Banja	196	2.38	–
Party of United Pensioners of Serbia	123	1.49	–
Total	8,250	100.00	19
Valid votes	8,250	96.04	
Invalid/blank votes	340	3.96	
Total votes	8,590	100.00	
Registered voters/turnout	12,764	67.30	

Incumbent mayor Zoran Vidanović of the Democratic Party of Serbia was confirmed for another term in office after the election. The government initially consisted of the Democratic Party of Serbia, the Socialists, and the Reformist Party. Vidanović left the Democratic Party of Serbia in September 2012 and joined the United Regions of Serbia. That party dissolved in 2015, at which time Vidanović joined the Serbian People's Party.

====== Palilula, Niš ======
Results of the election for the Municipal Assembly of Palilula, Niš:

Party	Votes	%	Seats
Let's Get Palilula Moving–Tomislav Nikolić (Serbian Progressive Party, New Serbia, Strength of Serbia Movement, Movement of Socialists)	7,697	24.00	7
United Regions of Serbia–Branislav Jovanović	5,831	18.18	5
Ivica Dačić–Socialist Party of Serbia (SPS), Party of United Pensioners of Serbia (PUPS), United Serbia (JS)	5,218	16.27	5
Choice for a Better Life–Boris Tadić (Democratic Party)	3,997	12.47	4
Democratic Party of Serbia–Vojislav Koštunica	2,195	6.85	2
Čedomir Jovanović–U-Turn–LDP–SPO–Zaplanje My Home–Movement for Niš	1,885	5.88	1
Dveri for the Life of Palilula	1,800	5.61	1
Serbian Radical Party–Dr. Aleksandar Martinović	1,338	4.17	–
Reformist Party–Prof. Dr. Milan Višnjić	1,098	3.42	–
United Peasant Party–Milija Miletić–Responsibly for the Peasants	432	1.35	–
Roma Unity Party–Rom Romese	307	0.96	–
Citizens' Group: United Serbian Movement–Mr. Zoran Jović	267	0.83	–
Total	32,065	100.00	25
Valid votes	32,065	95.65	
Invalid/blank votes	1,460	4.35	
Total votes	33,525	100.00	
Registered voters/turnout	65,095	51.50	

Boban Džunić of the Progressive Party was chosen as mayor after the election. The government consisted of the Progressives, the Socialists, and the United Regions of Serbia, with outside support from the Democratic Party of Serbia.

====== Pantelej ======
Results of the election for the Municipal Assembly of Pantelej:

Party	Votes	%	Seats
Let's Get Pantelej Moving–Tomislav Nikolić (Serbian Progressive Party, Strength of Serbia Movement, Movement of Socialists)	4,727	20.79	6
Choice for a Better Life–Boris Tadić (Democratic Party)	4,449	19.57	6
United Regions of Serbia–Branislav Jovanović	3,452	15.18	4
Ivica Dačić–Socialist Party of Serbia (SPS), Party of United Pensioners of Serbia (PUPS), United Serbia (JS)	2,523	11.10	3
Čedomir Jovanović–U-Turn–LDP–SPO–Rich Serbia–Zaplanje My Home–Movement for Niš	1,428	6.28	2
Democratic Party of Serbia–Vojislav Koštunica	1,416	6.23	2
New Serbia	1,130	4.97	–
Dveri for the Life of Pantelej	1,118	4.92	–
Reformist Party	895	3.94	–
Serbian Radical Party	706	3.11	–
Coalition: Movement of Workers and Peasants–United Peasant Party	489	2.15	–
Communist Party–Josip Broz	400	1.76	–
Total	22,733	100.00	23
Valid votes	22,733	95.48	
Invalid/blank votes	1,076	4.52	
Total votes	23,809	100.00	
Registered voters/turnout	41,884	56.85	

Srđan Savić of the Socialist Party was chosen as mayor after the election. The government consisted of the Progressives, the United Regions of Serbia, and the Socialists.

===== Aleksinac =====
Results of the election for the Municipal Assembly of Aleksinac:

Party	Votes	%	Seats
Let's Get Aleksinac Moving–Tomislav Nikolić (Serbian Progressive Party, Strength of Serbia Movement, Movement of Socialists)	5,726	22.56	16
Democratic Party of Serbia–Ivan Dimić	4,834	19.05	13
Ivica Dačić–Socialist Party of Serbia, Party of United Pensioners of Serbia, United Serbia, Movement of Veterans	4,218	16.62	11
Choice for a Better Aleksinac–Boris Tadić (Democratic Party)	3,860	15.21	10
Grujica Veljković–United Regions of Serbia	1,897	7.48	5
Citizens' Group: Aleksinac Movement for Change	1,217	4.80	–
Serbian Radical Party–Dr. Aleksandar Martinović	1,182	4.66	–
Čedomir Jovanović–U-Turn (Liberal Democratic Party, Serbian Renewal Movement)	859	3.39	–
Social Democratic Alliance–Miroslav Popović	858	3.38	–
Citizens' Group: To Ask the People	725	2.86	–
Total	25,376	100.00	55
Valid votes	25,376	96.44	
Invalid/blank votes	936	3.56	
Total votes	26,312	100.00	
Registered voters/turnout	44,242	59.47	

Incumbent mayor Ivan Dimić of the Democratic Party of Serbia was initially confirmed for a new term in office after the election in June 2012, leading a coalition government that also included the Democratic Party, the Party of United Pensioners of Serbia, and United Serbia. This coalition quickly broke down, however, and a new administration consisting of the Progressives, the United Regions of Serbia, the Socialists, and United Serbia came to power the following month, with Nenad Stanković of the Progressives in the role of mayor.

===== Doljevac =====
Results of the election for the Municipal Assembly of Doljevac:

Party	Votes	%	Seats
Goran Ljubić "Međarac"–United Regions of Serbia	7,938	64.33	26
Choice for a Better Life–Boris Tadić (Democratic Party)	1,622	13.14	5
Let's Get Doljevac Moving–Tomislav Nikolić (Serbian Progressive Party, Strength of Serbia Movement, Movement of Socialists, Roma Movement of Doljevac, Democratic Party of Serbia)	1,190	9.64	3
Ivica Dačić–Socialist Party of Serbia (SPS)	1,113	9.02	3
Serbian Radical Party–Dr. Aleksandar Martinović	350	2.84	–
Dr. Jovan Krkobabić–Party of United Pensioners of Serbia	127	1.03	–
Total	12,340	100.00	37
Valid votes	12,340	97.77	
Invalid/blank votes	282	2.23	
Total votes	12,622	100.00	
Registered voters/turnout	15,068	83.77	

Incumbent mayor Goran Ljubić of the United Regions of Serbia was confirmed for another term in office after the election. The United Regions party dissolved in late 2015, and Ljubić joined the Progressives in February 2016, bringing the entire United Regions assembly group with him.

===== Gadžin Han =====
Results of the election for the Municipal Assembly of Gadžin Han:

Party	Votes	%	Seats
Socialist Party of Serbia (SPS), Party of United Pensioners of Serbia (PUPS)	2,070	34.11	13
"United Serbia"	939	15.47	5
Democratic Party of Serbia	849	13.99	5
Democratic Party	777	12.80	4
Let's Get Gadžin Han Moving–Tomislav Nikolić (Serbian Progressive Party, Strength of Serbia Movement, Citizens' Group)	595	9.81	3
Southeast Serbia Movement–Rich Serbia	528	8.70	3
United Regions of Serbia	310	5.11	–
Total	6,068	100.00	33
Valid votes	6,068	96.58	
Invalid/blank votes	215	3.42	
Total votes	6,283	100.00	
Registered voters/turnout	7,925	79.28	

Incumbent mayor Saša Đorđević of the Socialist Party was confirmed for another term in office after the election.

===== Merošina =====
Results of the election for the Municipal Assembly of Merošina:

Party	Votes	%	Seats
Ivica Dačić–Socialist Party of Serbia (SPS)–Slobodan Todorović	1,751	19.61	9
Democratic Party–Boris Tadić	1,573	17.62	8
United Regions of Serbia–Goran Mikić	1,520	17.03	8
Let's Get Merošina Moving–Tomislav Nikolić (Serbian Progressive Party, New Serbia, Strength of Serbia Movement, Movement of Socialists)	938	10.51	4
Citizens' Group: Socialists for the Jugbogdanovački River	519	5.81	2
Serbian Radical Party–Dr. Aleksandar Martinović	505	5.66	2
Citizens' Group: "Let's Be Human", Veljković Saša Sašinka	466	5.22	2
Reformist Party–Prof. Dr. Milan Višnjić	463	5.19	2
Coalition: Democratic Party of Serbia–New Social Democrats–Goran Ilić	449	5.03	–
Dr. Jovan Krkobabić–Party of United Pensioners of Serbia	306	3.43	–
Citizens' Group: Movement of Workers and Peasants–United Serbia (Palma)	225	2.52	–
Čedomir Jovanović–U-Turn (Liberal Democratic Party, Serbian Renewal Movement)	213	2.39	–
Total	8,928	100.00	37
Valid votes	8,928	97.21	
Invalid/blank votes	256	2.79	
Total votes	9,184	100.00	
Registered voters/turnout	11,360	80.85	

Incumbent mayor Slobodan Todorović of the Socialist Party of Serbia was initially confirmed for another term in office, leading a coalition government that also included the Democratic Party and the United Regions of Serbia. Sanja Miladinović of the Democratic Party was chosen as president of the assembly.

In December 2012, the United Regions of Serbia formed a new governing coalition with the Progressives, aided by two former Socialist delegates. Sanja Stajić, at the time a member of the United Regions of Serbia, was chosen as mayor. Stajić was in turn dismissed in November 2013 and replaced by Bojan Nešić of the Progressive Party.

In April 2016, the local Progressive organization attempted to replace Nešić. This led to a split in the party's assembly delegation, with Nešić forming a breakaway group called "Naprednjaci Merošine" and establishing a new coalition with the Democratic Party.

===== Ražanj =====
Results of the election for the Municipal Assembly of Ražanj:

Party	Votes	%	Seats
New Serbia–Dobrica Stojković	2,575	50.30	16
Democratic Party–Boris Tadić	502	9.81	3
Let's Get Ražanj Moving–Tomislav Nikolić (Serbian Progressive Party, Strength of Serbia Movement)	454	8.87	2
Ivica Dačić–Socialist Party of Serbia (SPS), United Serbia (JS)	354	6.92	2
Democratic Party of Serbia–Vojislav Koštunica	347	6.78	2
Citizens' Group: Verislav Velisavljević Verče	306	5.98	2
Čedomir Jovanović–U-Turn (Liberal Democratic Party, Serbian Renewal Movement, Rich Serbia)	185	3.61	–
Coalition: Strong Regions, Strong Serbia, United Regions of Serbia–Only the People, Social Democratic Party of Serbia	163	3.18	–
Serbian Radical Party–Dr. Aleksandar Martinović	94	1.84	–
Party of United Pensioners of Serbia–Dr. Jovan Krkobabić	80	1.56	–
Citizens' Group: For Ražanj–Vesna Radojković	59	1.15	–
Total	5,119	100.00	27
Valid votes	5,119	96.82	
Invalid/blank votes	168	3.18	
Total votes	5,287	100.00	
Registered voters/turnout	7,894	66.97	

Incumbent mayor Dobrica Stojković of New Serbia was confirmed for another term in office after the election.

===== Svrljig =====
Results of the election for the Municipal Assembly of Svrljig:

Party	Votes	%	Seats
United Peasant Party–Responsibly for Peasants and Workers–Miletić Milija	3,456	41.63	14
Ivica Dačić–Socialist Party of Serbia, United Serbia, New Serbia	1,033	12.44	4
United Regions of Serbia–Strong Svrljig, Strong Serbia	813	9.79	3
Choice for a Better Life–Boris Tadić (Democratic Party)	805	9.70	3
Let's Get Svrljig Moving–Tomislav Nikolić (Serbian Progressive Party, Strength of Serbia Movement)	718	8.65	3
Party of United Pensioners of Serbia	382	4.60	–
Democratic Party of Serbia–Dr. Vojislav Koštunica	324	3.90	–
Citizens' Group: Dveri–For the Life of Svrljig	245	2.95	–
Čedomir Jovanović–U-Turn (Liberal Democratic Party, Social Democratic Union)	214	2.58	–
Serbian Radical Party–Dr. Aleksandar Martinović	181	2.18	–
Communist Party–Josip Broz	130	1.57	–
Total	8,301	100.00	27
Valid votes	8,301	95.51	
Invalid/blank votes	390	4.49	
Total votes	8,691	100.00	
Registered voters/turnout	12,789	67.96	

Incumbent mayor Milija Miletić of the United Peasant Party was confirmed for another term in office after the election. The local government also included the United Regions of Serbia. Miletić resigned in April 2014 after being elected to the National Assembly of Serbia and was replaced by fellow party member Jelena Trifunović.

==== Pirot District ====
Local elections were held all four municipalities of the Pirot District. The results did not follow a clear pattern.

In Pirot, Vladan Vasić's Coalition for Pirot won a clear victory and formed a coalition government afterward.

The Democratic Party won the elections and formed government in Bela Palanka and Dimitrovgrad, though it both cases it later lost power via splits in the party. In Bela Palanka, the serving mayor from the Democratic Party joined the breakaway New Democratic Party in 2014, taking the local party board with him. In Dimitrovgrad, a new coalition including the Democratic Party of Bulgarians and Together for Serbia formed government in 2013, and the Progressives ultimately came to power in early 2015.

The Progressives won the election in Babušnica and formed a coalition government afterward.

===== Pirot =====
Results of the election for the Municipal Assembly of Pirot:

Party	Votes	%	Seats
Vladan Vasić–Coalition for Pirot–United Regions of Serbia	10,510	33.87	23
Let's Get Pirot Moving–Tomislav Nikolić (Serbian Progressive Party)	4,709	15.17	10
Ivica Dačić–SPS, PUPS	3,535	11.39	7
Choice for a Better Life–Boris Tadić (Democratic Party)	2,729	8.79	5
Citizens' Group: New Force of Pirot–Dimitrije Vidanović	2,275	7.33	4
Citizens' Group: Movement for Pirot–Dušan Mitić	1,917	6.18	4
Citizens' Group: Pirot Progressives–It's Time for Change–Dr. Milan Stojanović	1,755	5.66	3
Čedomir Jovanović–U-Turn–Dr. Ivan Ilić	1,516	4.89	–
SRS–Dr. Aleksandar Martinović	1,395	4.50	–
Social Democratic Alliance–Dobrivoje Aranđelović	691	2.23	–
Total	31,032	100.00	56
Valid votes	31,032	96.08	
Invalid/blank votes	1,265	3.92	
Total votes	32,297	100.00	
Registered voters/turnout	50,450	64.02	

Incumbent mayor Vladan Vasić of the Coalition for Pirot, which was part of the broader United Regions of Serbia (URS) coalition, was confirmed for another term in office after the election. The Coalition for Pirot collectively joined the URS when it became a unified political party in 2013. The URS became largely dormant after the 2014 Serbian parliamentary election, and the Coalition for Pirot became a separate entity again at that time.

===== Babušnica =====
Results of the election for the Municipal Assembly of Babušnica:

Party	Votes	%	Seats
Let's Get Babušcina Moving–Tomislav Nikolić (Serbian Progressive Party)	1,490	18.18	8
"Ivica Dačić–Socialist Party of Serbia (SPS)–Party of United Pensioners of Serbia (PUPS)"	1,365	16.65	7
Choice for a Better Life–Boris Tadić (Democratic Party)	1,107	13.50	5
Coalition: "Together for Babušnica–Citizens' Group: Miroljub Jovanović Dr. Mile, Dejan Lazarević SPO, Movement of Workers and Peasants"–Dr. Miroljub Jovanović	1,029	12.55	5
United Regions of Serbia–For a Strong Serbia–Dr. Dragan Kostić	794	9.69	4
New Serbia–Dr. Slave Kostić	767	9.36	4
Democratic Party of Serbia–Dr. Vojislav Koštunica	473	5.77	2
United Serbia–Dragan Božilović	467	5.70	2
Citizens' Group: Let's Help Ourselves, Let's Not Choose the Same Ones–Dr. Goša	347	4.23	–
Čedomir Jovanović–U-Turn Liberal Democratic Party, Social Democratic Union	187	2.28	–
Serbian Radical Party–Dr. Aleksandar Martinović	172	2.10	–
Total	8,198	100.00	37
Valid votes	8,198	96.79	
Invalid/blank votes	272	3.21	
Total votes	8,470	100.00	
Registered voters/turnout	11,209	75.56	

Saša Stamenković of the Serbian Progressive Party became mayor after the election. The parliamentary majority initially consisted of the Progressives, the Socialist Party of Serbia, United Serbia, the Democratic Party of Serbia, the United Regions of Serbia, and New Serbia.

===== Bela Palanka =====
Results of the election for the Municipal Assembly of Bela Palanka:

Party	Votes	%	Seats
Democratic Party–Boris Tadić	2,864	35.15	12
Ivica Dačić–Socialist Party of Serbia (SPS), Party of United Pensioners of Serbia (PUPS), United Serbia (JS)	2,809	34.48	12
Serbian Progressive Party–Tomislav Nikolić	841	10.32	3
Citizens' Groups (two different lists)	507	6.22	2
Čedomir Jovanović–U-Turn–Marko Mladenović (Liberal Democratic Party, Social Democratic Union)	410	5.03	–
United Regions of Serbia–Tiosav Pešić	277	3.40	–
Serbian Radical Party–Dr. Aleksandar Martinović	230	2.82	–
Democratic Party of Serbia–Dr. Vojislav Koštunica	209	2.57	–
Total	8,147	100.00	29
Valid votes	8,147	96.61	
Invalid/blank votes	286	3.39	
Total votes	8,433	100.00	
Registered voters/turnout	10,202	82.66	

Goran Miljković of the Democratic Party was chosen as mayor after the election, supported by the two delegates from the Coalition for Bela Palanka and one delegate from United Serbia. Following a split in the Democratic Party at the republic level in 2014, Miljković joined Boris Tadić's New Democratic Party, which was later renamed as the Social Democratic Party.

===== Dimitrovgrad =====
Results of the election for the Municipal Assembly of Dimitrovgrad:

Party	Votes	%	Seats
Democratic Party–Boris Tadić	2,713	40.53	13
Nebojša Ivanov–Democratic Party of Bulgarians–United Regions of Serbia	1,323	19.76	6
Let's Get Dimitrovgrad Moving–Tomislav Nikolić–SNS, DSS–Vojislav Koštunica	849	12.68	4
Ivica Dačić–Socialist Party of Serbia (SPS)–SDP Serbia	539	8.05	2
Čedomir Jovanović–U-Turn–LDP, Party of Bulgarians of Serbia, SPO	461	6.89	2
Citizens' Group: "Truth and Solidarity"–Zoran Ćurov	425	6.35	2
PUPS–Nikola Stojanov	239	3.57	–
Serbian Radical Party–Dr. Aleksandar Martinović	145	2.17	–
Total	6,694	100.00	29
Valid votes	6,694	96.40	
Invalid/blank votes	250	3.60	
Total votes	6,944	100.00	
Registered voters/turnout	9,088	76.41	

Vladica Dimitrov of the Democratic Party was chosen as mayor after the election. Zoran Petrov, also of the Democratic Party, became deputy mayor. After a split in the Democratic Party at the republican level in 2013, Petrov joined Together for Serbia and brought eight the Democratic Party's local assembly members with him. Dimitrovgrad's government was restructured soon thereafter: Nebojša Ivanov of the Democratic Party of Bulgarians became mayor, while Petrov continued to serve as deputy mayor.

Dimitrovgrad's government was restructured again in January 2015, and Zoran Đurov of the Serbian Progressive Party was chosen as mayor.

Parliamentarian Donka Banović was one of two Democratic Party of Serbia candidates elected to the local assembly on the coalition list with the Serbian Progressive Party. She left the Democratic Party of Serbia in late 2014 and helped to found a new party called the State-Building Movement.

==== Podunavlje District ====
Local elections were held in the one city (Smederevo) and the two other municipalities of the Podunavlje District. An independent list won in Smederevo; the following year, the list's delegates collectively joined the Serbian Progressive Party. The Democratic Party won in Smederevska Palanka and held power for the entire term, while the Democratic Party of Serbia won in Velika Plana but fell from power in 2015, when a new coalition dominated by the Progressives came to power.

===== Smederevo =====
Results of the election for the City Assembly of Smederevo:

Party	Votes	%	Seats
Movement for Smederevo–Dr. Jasna Avramović	11,744	24.61	20
Democratic Party Boris Tadić	7,540	15.80	12
Ivica Dačić–Socialist Party of Serbia (SPS), United Serbia (JS)–Branče Stojanović	6,193	12.98	10
Let's Get Smederevo Moving–Tomislav Nikolić (Serbian Progressive Party, New Serbia, PUPS, Movement of Socialists)	5,681	11.90	9
Coalition for a Better Smederevo–Milan Lukić	3,942	8.26	6
United Regions of Serbia–Mr. Milan Dopuđa	3,109	6.51	5
Čedomir Jovanović–U-Turn (LDP–SPO)	2,652	5.56	4
Democratic Party of Serbia–Vojislav Koštunica	2,574	5.39	4
Social Democratic Party of Serbia–Rasim Ljajić	1,215	2.55	–
Serbian Radical Party–Dr. Aleksandar Martinović	1,200	2.51	–
Social Democratic Alliance–Miomir Đukić	1,095	2.29	–
Citizens' Group: "The Will of the People of Smederevo" Nenad Šikuljak	462	0.97	–
Citizens' Group: "Serbia 21" Smederevo	321	0.67	–
Total	47,728	100.00	70
Valid votes	47,728	96.02	
Invalid/blank votes	1,977	3.98	
Total votes	49,705	100.00	
Registered voters/turnout	97,166	51.15	

Jasna Avramović of the Movement for Smederevo was chosen as mayor after the election. In June 2013, Avramović and the entire Movement for Smederevo assembly group joined the Serbian Progressive Party.

===== Smederevska Palanka =====
Results of the election for the Municipal Assembly of Smederevska Palanka:

Party	Votes	%	Seats
Democratic Party–Liberal Democratic Party–Social Democratic Party of Serbia–"Greens"	6,482	25.32	15
Socialist Party of Serbia–Movement of Veterans	4,570	17.85	11
Serbian Progressive Party	3,743	14.62	9
Democratic Party of Serbia–New Serbia	3,148	12.30	7
Citizens' Groups (two different lists)	2,162	8.45	–
United Regions of Serbia	1,783	6.97	4
Serbian Renewal Movement	1,460	5.70	3
United Serbia–Party of United Pensioners of Serbia	1,183	4.62	–
Serbian Radical Party	653	2.55	–
"Together for Šumadija"	222	0.87	–
Social Democratic Alliance	190	0.74	–
Total	25,596	100.00	49
Valid votes	25,596	95.43	
Invalid/blank votes	1,227	4.57	
Total votes	26,823	100.00	
Registered voters/turnout	44,240	60.63	

Radoslav Milojičić of the Democratic Party was chosen as mayor after the election. Although the government was initially unstable, Milojičić remained in office for the entire term.

===== Velika Plana =====
Results of the election for the Municipal Assembly of Velika Plana:

Party	Votes	%	Seats
DSS–Dejan Šulkić–Our Municipality in 1st Place	6,080	30.83	14
"DS, LDP, SDPS, Greens of Serbia"–Dr. Ivo Đinović	3,862	19.59	8
"Ivica Dačić–Socialist Party of Serbia (SPS), Party of United Pensioners of Serbia (PUPS), United Serbia (JS)"	3,458	17.54	8
Let's Get Velika Plana Moving–Tomislav Nikolić (Serbian Progressive Party, Strength of Serbia Movement)	3,268	16.57	7
United Regions of Serbia–For Our Place	1,183	6.00	2
Serbian Radical Party–Dr. Aleksandar Martinović	935	4.74	–
Citizens' Group: Dveri for the Life of Velika Plana	933	4.73	–
Total	19,719	100.00	39

Incumbent mayor Dejan Šulkić of the Democratic Party of Serbia was confirmed for another term in office after the election. His term ended on 25 August 2015, when the local Democratic Party board formed a new coalition with the Serbian Progressive Party (against the wishes of the Democratic Party at the republic level). Igor Matković of the Progressives was chosen as mayor following this change.
