= List of members of the National Assembly of Serbia, 2008–2012 =

This is a list of the 250 members of the 2008–2012 National Assembly of Serbia, as well as a list of former members of the 2008–2012 National Assembly.

The 2008–2012 National Assembly was elected in the 2008 parliamentary election, and it held its first session on 11 June 2008. The 2008–2012 National Assembly was the 8th assembly since the reestablishment of the multi-party system, after the 1990 parliamentary election.

== MNAs by party ==
Name	Abbr.	Leader	Ideology	Political position	MPs	Gov′t
Democratic Party; Демократска странка Demokratska stranka	DS	Boris Tadić	Social democracy Social liberalism	Centre to centre-left	64 / 250	G
Serbian Radical Party; Српска радикална странка Srpska radikalna stranka	SRS	Vojislav Šešelj	Ultranationalism; Serbian irredentism	Far-right	57 / 250	O
G17 Plus; Г17 Плус; G17 Plus	G17+	Mlađan Dinkić	Liberal conservatism Pro-Europeanism	Centre to centre-right	24 / 250	G
Serbian Progressive Party; Српска напредна странка Srpska napredna stranka	SNS	Tomislav Nikolić	National conservatism Pro-Europeanism	Centre-right to right-wing	21 / 250	O
Democratic Party of Serbia; Демократска странка Србије; Demokratska stranka Srbije	DSS	Vojislav Koštunica	National conservatism Christian democracy	Right-wing	21 / 250	O
Socialist Party of Serbia; Социјалистичка партија Србије; Socijalistička partija Srbije	SPS	Ivica Dačić	Democratic socialism Left-wing populism	Centre-left	12 / 250	G
Liberal Democratic Party; Либерално демократска партија Liberalno demokratska partija	LDP	Čedomir Jovanović	Liberalism; Atlanticism	Centre	11 / 250	O
New Serbia; Нова Србија; Nova Srbija	NS	Velimir Ilić	Right-wing populism Monarchism	Right-wing	9 / 250	O
Party of United Pensioners of Serbia; Партија уједињених пензионера Србије; Partija ujedinjenih penzionera Srbije	PUPS	Jovan Krkobabić	Pensioners' interests Pro-Europeanism	Single-issue	5 / 250	G
League of Social Democrats of Vojvodina; Лига социјалдемократа Војводине; Liga socijaldemokrata Vojvodine	LSV	Nenad Čanak	Social democracy Regionalism	Centre-left	5 / 250	G
Serbian Renewal Movement; Српски покрет обнове Srpski pokret obnove	SPO	Vuk Drašković	Monarchism; Atlanticism	Centre-right	4 / 250	G
Social Democratic Party of Serbia; Социјалдемократска партија Србије; Socijaldemokratska partija Srbije	SDPS	Rasim Ljajić	Social democracy Pro-Europeanism	Centre-left	4 / 250	G
Alliance of Vojvodina Hungarians; Савез војвођанских Мађара; Savez vojvođanskih Mađara	SVM	István Pásztor	Hungarian minority politics Conservatism	Centre-right	4 / 250	S
United Serbia; Јединствена Србија; Jedinstvena Srbija	JS	Dragan Marković	Serbian nationalism National conservatism	Right-wing	3 / 250	S
Party of Democratic Action of Sandžak; Странка демократске акције Санџака; Stranka demokratske akcije Sandžaka	SDA	Sulejman Ugljanin	Bosniak minority politics Bosniak nationalism	Right-wing	2 / 250	G
Social Democratic Union; Социјалдемократска унија Socijaldemokratska unija	SDU	Žarko Korać	Social democracy Pro-Europeanism	Centre-left	1 / 250	O
Christian Democratic Party of Serbia; Демохришћанска странка Србије; Demohrišćanska stranka Srbije	DHSS	Vladan Batić	Christian democracy Atlanticism	Centre-right	1 / 250	S
Party for Democratic Action ?Партија за демократско деловање Partija za demokratsko delovanje	PDD	Riza Halimi	Albanian minority politics Regionalism	Right-wing	1 / 250	S

== List of members of the 8th National Assembly ==
Portrait	Name	Political Party	Place of living	Year of birth
	Milan Avramović	Serbian Radical Party	Belgrade	1980
	Borjan Аgatonović	Democratic Party	Donji Ribnik	1956
	Boris Aleksić	Serbian Radical Party	Belgrade	1975
	Miloš Aligrudić	Democratic Party of Serbia	Belgrade	1964
	Ivan Andrić	Liberal Democratic Party	Belgrade	1974
	Zoran Antić	Serbian Progressive Party (previously Serbian Radical Party)	Jagodina	1962
	Konstantin Arsenović	Party of United Pensioners of Serbia	Belgrade, New Belgrade	1940
	Veroljub Arsić	Serbian Progressive Party (previously Serbian Radical Party)	Požarevac	1969
	Dragan Aćimović	Serbian Radical Party	Banovo Polje	1976
	Zoran Babić	Serbian Progressive Party (previously Serbian Radical Party)	Vrnjačka Banja	1971
	Dušan Bajatović	Socialist Party of Serbia	Novi Sad	1967
	Donka Banović	Democratic Party of Serbia	Dimitrovgrad	1963
	Igor Bečić	Serbian Progressive Party (previously Serbian Radical Party)	Vrbas	1971
	Dragoslav Božović	Democratic Party	Belgrade	1949
	Zoran Bortić	Socialist Party of Serbia	Šabac	1965
	Željko Brestovački	Democratic Party	Šid	1965
	Marija Bugarčić	Liberal Democratic Party	Lučani	1979
	Jelena Budimirović	Serbian Progressive Party (previously Serbian Radical Party)	Martinci	1985
	Milorad Buha	Serbian Radical Party	Veternik	1957
	Laslo Varga	Alliance of Vojvodina Hungarians	Palić	1976
	Zoran Vasić	United Serbia	Jagodina	1962
	Janko Veselinović	Democratic Party	Novi Sad	1965
	Milan Veselinović	Serbian Radical Party	Novi Pazar	1956
	Maja Videnović	Democratic Party	Belgrade	1979
	Aleksandar Vlahović	Democratic Party	Sopot	1963
	Milica Vojić-Marković	Democratic Party of Serbia	Valjevo	1959
	Lidija Vukićević	Serbian Radical Party	Belgrade	1962
	Jadranko Vuković	Serbian Radical Party	Zemun	1961
	Simo Vuković	G17 Plus	Belgrade	1975
	Slobodan Vuković	Serbian Radical Party	Belgrade	1953
	Milan Vučković	Democratic Party	Kragujevac	1979
	Nataša Vučković	Democratic Party	Belgrade, Savski Venac	1967
	Žika Gojković	Serbian Renewal Movement	Sombor	1972
	Slobodan Gojković	Democratic Party	Prijepolje	1951
	Suzana Grubješić	G17 Plus	Belgrade	1963
	Mladen Grujić	New Serbia	Belgrade, Vračar	1966
	Jovan Damjanović	Democratic Left of the Roma (previously Serbian Radical Party)	Zemun	1947
	Božidar Delić	Serbian Radical Party (Serbian Progressive Party 2008–2011)	Belgrade	1956
	Lidija Dimitrijević	Serbian Radical Party	Leskovac	1975
	Milan Dimitrijević	Democratic Party of Serbia	Belgrade	1950
	Mlađan Dinkić	G17 Plus	Belgrade	1964
	Vuk Dinčić	Democratic Party	Zemun	1979
	Momčilo Duvnjak	Serbian Radical Party	Kruševac	1958
	Saša Dujović	Movement of Veterans (previously Movement of Veterans of Serbia)	Zemun	1966
	Zlata Đerić	New Serbia	Sombor	1958
	Branimir Đokić	Serbian Radical Party	Belgrade	1950
	Dragiša Đoković	Democratic Party	Kosovska Mitrovica	1959
	Slavica Đukić Dejanović; President of the National Assembly	Socialist Party of Serbia	Kragujevac	1951
	Arsen Đurić	Democratic Party of Serbia	Zlatibor	1973
	Bojan Đurić	Liberal Democratic Party	Zemun	1978
	Marko Đurišić	Democratic Party	Belgrade	1968
	Srboljub Živanović	Serbian Radical Party	Jelenča	1953
	Dragan Živkov	Serbian Radical Party	Bačko Gradište	1958
	Anikó Zsíros Jankelić	Democratic Party	Senta	1967
	Viorel Žura	G17 Plus	Alibunar	1950
	Nikola Žutić	Serbian Radical Party	Belgrade	1952
	Stefan Zankov	Serbian Progressive Party (previously Serbian Radical Party)	Zaječar	1976
	Ljiljana Zdravković	Democratic Party	Lazarevac	1950
	Slaviša Zlatanović	G17 Plus	Leskovac	1967
	Željko Ivanji	G17 Plus	Belgrade	1970
	Velimir Ilić	New Serbia	Čačak	1951
	Vladimir Ilić	G17 Plus	Požarevac	1963
	Radiša Ilić	Serbian Radical Party	Stubica	1969
	Mile Ilić	Socialist Party of Serbia	Niš	1954
	Aleksandar Јanković	Democratic Party	Jagodina	1972
	Аleksandra Јanković	New Serbia	Belgrade	1959
	Miloš Jevtić	Democratic Party	Smederevo	1972
	Milutin Jeličić	New Serbia	Brus	1962
	Vladan Jeremić	Serbian Radical Party	Mladenovac	1974
	Aleksandra Jerkov	League of Social Democrats of Vojvodina	Novi Sad	1982
	Branislav Jovanović	G17 Plus	Niš	1955
	Ivan Jovanović	Democratic Party	Kraljevo	1977
	Nataša Jovanović	Serbian Radical Party	Kragujevac	1966
	Čedomir Jovanović	Liberal Democratic Party	Belgrade	1971
	Jadranka Jovišić	Democratic Party	Novi Sad	1986
	Stanko Jovčić	Democratic Party	Lazarevac	1958
	Petar Jojić	Serbian Radical Party	Pančevo	1938
	Radica Jocić	Serbian Radical Party	Bela Palanka	1962
	Aleksandar Jugović	Serbian Renewal Movement	Čačak	1975
	Branka Karavidić	Democratic Party	Majdanpek	1958
	Zoran Kasalović	Socialist Party of Serbia	Žitište	1967
	Oto Kišmarton	Serbian Progressive Party (previously Serbian Radical Party)	Kikinda	1962
	Milan Knežević	Serbian Progressive Party (previously Serbian Radical Party)	Kragujevac	1952
	Elvira Kovács	Alliance of Vojvodina Hungarians	Zrenjanin	1982
	Nada Kolundžija	Democratic Party	Belgrade	1952
	Nenad Konstantinović	Democratic Party	Belgrade	1973
	Žarko Korać	Social Democratic Union	Belgrade	1947
	Bojan Kostreš	League of Social Democrats of Vojvodina	Zrenjanin	1974
	Ljubomir Kragović	Serbian Radical Party	Kosovska Mitrovica	1956
	Zoran Krasić	Serbian Radical Party	Belgrade	1956
	Nikola Krpić	Party of United Pensioners of Serbia	Kraljevo	1941
	Milorad Krstin	Serbian Radical Party	Taraš	1955
	Petar Kuntić	Democratic Alliance of Croats in Vojvodina	Subotica	1960
	Nikola Lazić	Democratic Party of Serbia	Belgrade	1974
	Milan Lapčević	Democratic Party of Serbia	Niš	1969
	Maja Laušević	Democratic Party	Novi Sad	1975
	Daniela Lovrin-Gavrilović	Democratic Party	Šabac	1970
	Gabor Lodi	Democratic Party	Klek	1961
	Ljiljana Lučić	Democratic Party	Belgrade	1953
	Branka Ljiljak	Democratic Party	Zrenjanin	1957
	Tomislav Ljubenović	Serbian Radical Party	Leskovac	1951
	Jon Magda	Democratic Party	Alibunar	1959
	Saša Maksimović	Serbian Progressive Party (previously Serbian Radical Party)	Novi Bečej	1976
	Miroslav Marinković	Democratic Party	Svilajnac	1961
	Vesna Marić	Serbian Radical Party	Mali Mokri Lug	1964
	Dušan Marić	Serbian Radical Party	Velika Plana	1963
	Miroslav Markićević	New Serbia	Čačak	1958
	Momir Marković	Serbian Radical Party	Zemun	1950
	Aleksandar Martinović	Serbian Radical Party	Ruma	1976
	Miroslav Martić	Democratic Party	Užice	1951
	Pavel Marčok	Democratic Party	Bački Petrovac	1968
	Zoran Mašić	Serbian Progressive Party (previously Serbian Radical Party)	Rumenka	1953
	Slađan Mijaljević	Serbian Radical Party	Borča	1966
	Predrag Mijatović	Serbian Progressive Party (previously Serbian Radical Party)	Vršac	1950
	Srđan Miković	Democratic Party	Pančevo	1961
	Ljiljana Miladinović	Serbian Progressive Party (previously Serbian Radical Party)	Belgrade	1962
	Marko Milenković	Serbian Radical Party	Žitorađa	1974
	Vladimir Milentijević	Democratic Party of Serbia	Zubin Potok	1951
	Srđan Milivojević	Democratic Party	Kruševac	1965
	Dušan Milisavljević	Democratic Party	Niš, Medijana	1968
	Smiljana Milisavljević	Democratic Party	Srbovac, Zvečan	1978
	Nenad Milić	Liberal Democratic Party	Belgrade	1962
	Đorđe Milićević	Socialist Party of Serbia	Valjevo	1978
	Radoslav Milovanović	Democratic Party	Kučevo	1961
	Vlada Milojković	Serbian Radical Party	Ražanj	1960
	Milena Milošević	Democratic Party	Belgrade	1950
	Kosta Milošević	Democratic Party	Čačak	1948
	Dejan Mirović	Serbian Radical Party	Belgrade	1972
	Slavoljub Mitov	Democratic Party	Vlasotince	1961
	Branislav Mitrović	G17 Plus	Užice	1966
	Nataša Mićić	Liberal Democratic Party	Užice	1965
	Dragoljub Mićunović	Democratic Party	New Belgrade	1930
	Vitomir Mihajlović	Social Democratic Party of Serbia	Prokuplje	1958
	Miletić Mihajlović	Socialist Party of Serbia	Petrovac	1951
	Ognjen Mihajlović	Serbian Radical Party	Zemun	1960
	Goran Mihajlović	Serbian Radical Party	Trstenik	1963
	Bojan Mladenović	Serbian Radical Party	Belgrade	1973
	Gorica Mojović	Democratic Party	Belgrade	1952
	Radoslav Mojsilović	New Serbia	Vranje	1978
	Paja Momčilov	Serbian Radical Party	Belgrade	1948
	Mirko Munjić	Serbian Radical Party	Čačak	1957
	Đura Mučenski	Democratic Party	Kula	1960
	Jovan Nešović	G17 Plus	Kraljevo	1970
	Dejan Nikolić	Democratic Party	Sokobanja	1979
	Zoran Nikolić	Democratic Party of Serbia	Šabac	1967
	Tijana Nikolić	Democratic Party	Belgrade	1983
	Tomislav Nikolić	Serbian Progressive Party (previously Serbian Radical Party)	Belgrade	1952
	Milan J. Nikolić	Socialist Party of Serbia	Vranje	1945
	Milan M. Nikolić	Serbian Radical Party	Arilje	1964
	Nikola Novaković	G17 Plus	Novi Sad	1949
	Radojko Obradović	Democratic Party of Serbia	Zemun	1966
	Bajram Omeragić	Party of Democratic Action of Sandžak	Novi Pazar	1960
	Meho Omerović	Social Democratic Party of Serbia	Belgrade, Palilula	1959
	Zoran Ostojić	Liberal Democratic Party	Belgrade	1956
	Jovan Palalić	Democratic Party of Serbia	Bačka Palanka	1971
	Olena Papuga	League of Social Democrats of Vojvodina	Kula	1964
	Balint Pastor	Alliance of Vojvodina Hungarians	Subotica	1979
	Gordana Paunović-Milosavljević	Serbian Radical Party	Zemun	1957
	Miroslava Pejica	G17 Plus	Loznica	1962
	Aleksandar Pejčić	Democratic Party of Serbia	Leskovac	1968
	Borislav Pelević	Serbian Progressive Party (previously Serbian Radical Party)	Belgrade	1956
	Đuro Perić	Party of United Pensioners of Serbia	Belgrade	1930
	Sreto Perić	Serbian Radical Party	Ljubovija	1959
	Ljubiša Petković	Serbian Radical Party	Belgrade	1952
	Miroslav Petković	Democratic Party of Serbia	Čačak	1968
	Stojanka Petković	G17 Plus	Zvečan	1959
	Zoran Petrov	Democratic Party	Dimitrovgrad	1965
	Petar Petrović	United Serbia	Jagodina	1951
	Milisav Petronijević	Socialist Party of Serbia	Belgrade, Savski Venac	1949
	Vesna Pešić	Liberal Democratic Party	Belgrade	1940
	Žarko Pivac	Democratic Party	Požarevac	1968
	Dejan Pisarević	United Serbia	Velika Plana	1965
	Dušanka Plećević	Serbian Radical Party	Bor	1953
	Vitomir Plužarević	Serbian Radical Party	Vrdnik	1950
	Gordana Pop-Lazić	Serbian Radical Party	Zemun	1956
	Zoran Popović	Serbian Radical Party	Ljig	1956
	Judita Popović	Liberal Democratic Party	Zrenjanin	1956
	Nenad Popović	Democratic Party of Serbia	Belgrade	1966
	Mileta Poskurica	Serbian Progressive Party (previously Serbian Radical Party)	Kragujevac	1954
	Munir Poturak	Social Democratic Party of Serbia	Novi Pazar	1958
	Dobrislav Prelić	Serbian Radical Party	Ratkovo	1963
	Nenad Prokić	Liberal Democratic Party	Belgrade	1954
	Mihailo Purić	Democratic Party	Banja Koviljača	1963
	Marina Raguš	Serbian Radical Party	Belgrade	1969
	Dejan Radenković	Socialist Party of Serbia	Priština	1971
	Vjerica Radeta	Serbian Radical Party	Zemun	1955
	Gojko Radić	Serbian Progressive Party (previously Serbian Radical Party)	Subotica	1960
	Milovan Radovanović	Serbian Radical Party	Aleksinac	1954
	Radovan Radovanović	League of Social Democrats of Vojvodina	Bačka Topola	1954
	Milica Radović	Democratic Party of Serbia	Belgrade	1976
	Miloš Radulović	Democratic Party of Serbia	Kruševac	1953
	Gordana Rajkov	Independent	Belgrade	1944
	Miljan Ranđelović	G17 Plus	Knjaževac	1981
	Nebojša Ranđelović	Liberal Democratic Party	Niš	1967
	Vlatko Ratković	Democratic Party	Ruma	1965
	Boško Ristić	Democratic Party	Niš	1961
	Mićo Rogović	Serbian Progressive Party (previously Serbian Radical Party)	Nova Varoš	1965
	Branko Ružić	Socialist Party of Serbia	Belgrade, Čukarica	1975
	Nikola Savić	Serbian Radical Party	Niš	1959
	Slobodan Samardžić	Democratic Party of Serbia	Belgrade	1953
	Konstantin Samofalov	Democratic Party	Belgrade	1982
	Snežana Sedlar	G17 Plus	Odžaci	1960
	Vlajko Senić	G17 Plus	Belgrade	1973
	Stevica Spajić	G17 Plus	Požarevac	1971
	Srđan Spasojević	New Serbia	Kraljevo	1966
	Sulejman Spaho	Serbian Radical Party	Loznica	1949
	Slavoljub Stajković	Democratic Party	Surdulica	1965
	Siniša Stamenković	Party of United Pensioners of Serbia	Kladovo	1949
	Milan Stanimirović	Democratic Party	Vrbas	1960
	Živojin Stanković	Democratic Party	Leskovac	1971
	Bojana Stanojević	Democratic Party	Vrnjačka Banja	1963
	Dragan Stevanović	Serbian Radical Party	Surdulica	1973
	Goran Stefanović	Democratic Party	Vranje	1972
	Miodrag Stoilović	Democratic Party	Velika Plana	1950
	Svetlana Stojaković-Milovanović	Democratic Party	Lajkovac	1960
	Svetlana Stojanović	Democratic Party of Serbia	Belgrade	1946
	Filip Stojanović	Serbian Radical Party	Belgrade	1944
	Nikola Stojšić	G17 Plus	Bačka Palanka	1969
	Ljubiša Sudimac	G17 Plus	Blace	1958
	Jorgovanka Tabaković	Serbian Progressive Party (previously Serbian Radical Party)	Novi Sad	1960
	Dragan Todorović	Serbian Radical Party	Belgrade	1953
	Marina Toman	Serbian Radical Party	Belgrade	1972
	Željko Tomić	Democratic Party of Serbia	Novi Sad	1965
	Tamaš Tot	Democratic Party	Ada	1980
	Vučeta Tošković	Serbian Progressive Party (previously Serbian Radical Party)	Novi Sad	1941
	Jelena Travar-Miljević	G17 Plus	Žitište	1979
	Jelena Trivan	Democratic Party	Belgrade	1973
	Nebojša Ćeran	Democratic Party	Belgrade	1964
	Milan Urošević	Democratic Party	Ub	1965
	Jovana Fa Tomić	G17 Plus	Kikinda	1984
	Arpad Fremond	Alliance of Vojvodina Hungarians	Pačir	1981
	Kenan Hajdarević	Liberal Democratic Party	Priboj	1975
	Riza Halimi	Party for Democratic Action	Preševo	1947
	Šerif Hamzagić	G17 Plus	Tutin	1956
	Biljana Hasanović-Korać	Democratic Party	Vršac	1955
	Jaroslav Hrebik	G17 Plus	Stara Pazova	1974
	Nenad Čanak	League of Social Democrats of Vojvodina	Novi Sad	1959
	Mirko Čikiriz	Serbian Renewal Movement	Kragujevac	1963
	Momo Čolaković	Party of United Pensioners of Serbia	Novi Sad	1940
	Dragan Čolić	Serbian Progressive Party (previously Serbian Radical Party)	Smederevo	1953
	Gordana Čomić	Democratic Party	Novi Sad	1958
	Aleksandar Čotrić	Serbian Renewal Movement	Belgrade, Stari Grad	1966
	Esad Džudžević	Bosniac Democratic Party of Sanjak	Tutin	1958
	Zoran Šami	Democratic Party of Serbia	Belgrade	1948
	Aleksandra Šarović	New Serbia	Belgrade	1981
	Nemanja Šarović	Serbian Radical Party	Belgrade	1974
	Edip Šerifov	Democratic Party	Belgrade	1977
	Bajram Šehović	Social Democratic Party of Serbia	Prijepolje	1952
	Milan Škrbić	Serbian Radical Party	Apatin	1960
	Dragan Šormaz	Serbian Progressive Party (previously Democratic Party of Serbia)	Smederevo	1967

== List of former members of the 9th National Assembly ==
Name	Political Party	Term of Office	Year of birth
Miloljub Albijanić	G17 Plus	11 June 2008 – 24 October 2008	1967
Vladan Batić	Christian Democratic Party of Serbia	11 June 2008 – 29 December 2010	1949
Goran Bogdanović	Democratic Party	11 June 2008 – 7 July 2008	1963
Elena Božić Talijan	Serbian Radical Party	11 June 2008 – 24 December 2009	1970
Željko Vasiljević	Movement of Veterans of Serbia	11 June 2008 – 27 August 2008	1963
Dragan Vujadinović	Democratic Party	11 June 2008 – 2 December 2009	1953
Milan Vuković	Democratic Party	11 June 2008 – 8 September 2008	1961
Dragi Damnjanović	G17 Plus	11 June 2008 – 27 September 2011	1967
Ivica Dačić	Socialist Party of Serbia	11 June 2008 – 7 July 2008	1966
Oliver Dulić	Democratic Party	11 June 2008 – 7 July 2008	1975
Milan Đokić	G17 Plus	11 June 2008 – 23 March 2010	1972
Nebojša Zdravković	G17 Plus	11 June 2008 – 28 September 2011	1969
Vladimir Jovanović	Democratic Party	11 June 2008 – 14 July 2008	1973
Dragan Jovanović	New Serbia	11 June 2008 – 8 July 2008	1972
Jagoda Jorga	Democratic Party	11 June 2008 – 16 February 2009	1952
Jovan Krkobabić	Party of United Pensioners of Serbia	11 June 2008 – 7 July 2008	1930
Nandor Maraci	Democratic Party	11 June 2008 – 15 December 2009	1948
Slobodan Maraš	Liberal Democratic Party	11 June 2008 – 22 November 2010	1966
Vesna Marjanović	Democratic Party	11 June 2008 – 11 April 2011	1969
Dragan Marković Palma	United Serbia	11 June 2008 – 24 September 2011	1960
Milovan Marković	Democratic Party	11 June 2008 – 6 November 2008	1954
Vesna Martinović	Democratic Party	11 June 2008 – 14 July 2008	1970
Radivoje Milanović	Democratic Party	11 June 2008 – 6 October 2008	1965
Saša Milenić	Together for Šumadija	11 June 2008 – 14 September 2011	1967
Jasmina Milošević	United Serbia	11 June 2008 – 15 December 2010	1968
Miodrag Miljković	G17 Plus	11 June 2008 – 31 October 2008	1958
Nadica Momirov	G17 Plus	11 June 2008 – 10 July 2008	1967
Milutin Mrkonjić	Socialist Party of Serbia	11 June 2008 – 7 July 2008	1942
Branislav Nedimović	Democratic Party of Serbia	11 June 2008 – 8 July 2008	1977
Žarko Obradović	Socialist Party of Serbia	11 June 2008 – 7 July 2008	1960
Veran Panić	Serbian Radical Party	11 June 2008 – 8 October 2008	1953
Elizabet Paunović	G17 Plus	27 October 2010 – 17 March 2011	1956
Vidoje Petrović	G17 Plus	11 June 2008 – 29 October 2008	1961
Daniel Petrović	League of Social Democrats of Vojvodina	11 June 2008 – 29 September 2008	1964
Miloš Simonović	Democratic Party	11 June 2008 – 1 September 2009	1973
Momčilo Spasić	G17 Plus	3 November 2009 – 2 March 2009	1952
Veroljub Stevanović	Together for Šumadija	11 June 2008 – 14 September 2011	1946
Snežana Stojanović-Plavšić	G17 Plus	30 October 2008 – 27 October 2010	1961
Dragan Tasić	Serbian Radical Party	11 June 2008 – 28 June 2008	1958
Ana Tomanova-Makanova	Democratic Party	11 June 2008 – 16 July 2008	1961
Ferzo Ćelović	Social Democratic Party of Serbia	11 June 2008 – 14 October 2008	1943
Predrag Umičević	Democratic Party	11 June 2008 – 30 June 2008	1963
Goran Cvetanović	Serbian Radical Party	28 December 2009 – 29 December 2009	1965
Dragomir Cimeša	Democratic Party	11 June 2008 – 30 November 2011	1960
Sava Čojčić	G17 Plus	11 June 2008 – 2 March 2011	1968
