= Ranđelović =

Ranđelović (Serbian Cyrillic: Ранђеловић) is a Serbian surname. Notable individuals named Ranđelović include:

- Aleksandar Ranđelović
- Ivan Ranđelović
- Kristian Ranđelović
- Lazar Ranđelović
- Marko Ranđelović
- Nebojša Ranđelović
- Predrag Ranđelović (footballer, born 1976), Serbian footballer
- Predrag Ranđelović (footballer, born 1990), Serbian-born Macedonia footballer
- Rade Ranđelović
- Sava Ranđelović
