= 8th National Assembly =

8th National Assembly may refer to:

- 8th National Assembly of France
- 8th National Assembly of Laos
- 8th National Assembly of Nigeria
- 8th National Assembly of Serbia
- 8th National Assembly of Slovenia
