= Miloš Simonović =

Miloš Simonović may refer to:

- Miloš Simonović (footballer)
- Miloš Simonović (politician)
