= Dušan Milisavljević =

Serbian politician

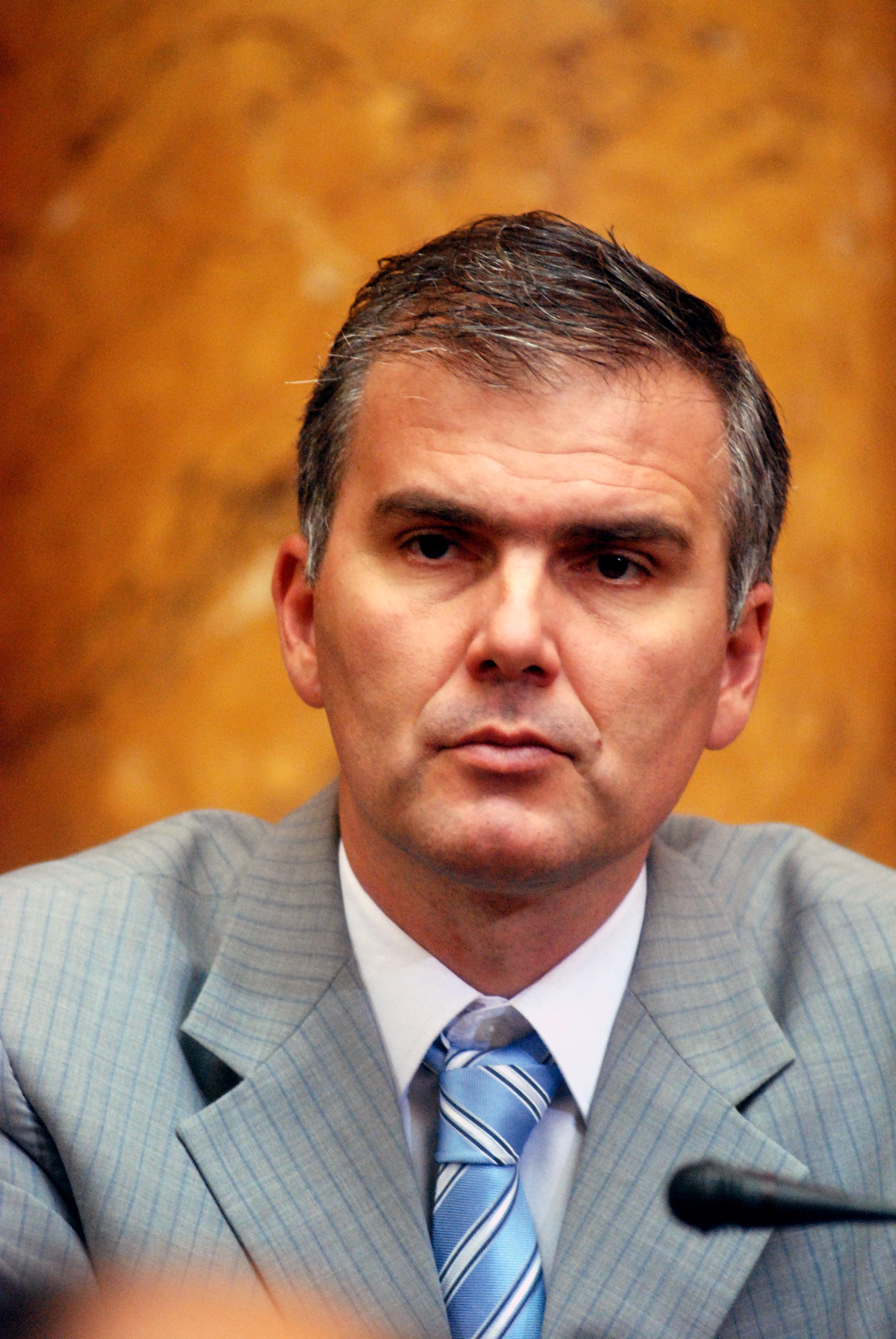
Dušan Milisavljević 2009

Dušan Milisavljević (Serbian Cyrillic: Душан Милисављевић; born March 15, 1968) is a medical doctor, academic, and politician in Serbia. He has served in the National Assembly of Serbia on an almost uninterrupted basis since 2008 as a member of the Democratic Party.

== Early life and career ==
Milisavljević was born in Niš, then part of the Socialist Republic of Serbia in the Socialist Federal Republic of Yugoslavia. He holds a bachelor's degree (1993) and a master's degree (1997) from the University of Niš Faculty of Medicine, and in 2002 he earned a Ph.D. in Zürich, Switzerland. He is an otorhinolaryngology specialist and a professor at the Niš Faculty of Medicine.

He has been president of the Democratic Party's organization in Medijana since 2006 and vice-president of the party's organization in Niš. He was a municipal councillor in Medijana prior to his resignation in 2014.

== Member of the Assembly ==
Milisavljević received the 145th position on the Democratic Party's electoral list in the 2007 parliamentary election. He was not subsequently chosen to join the party's assembly delegation. (From 2000 to 2011, parliamentary mandates were awarded to sponsoring parties or coalitions rather than to individual candidates, and it was common practice for the mandates to be distributed out of numerical order. Milisavljević could have been awarded a mandate despite his relatively low position on the list, although in the event he was not.)

The Democratic Party contested the 2008 Serbian parliamentary election at the head of an electoral alliance called For a European Serbia. Milisavljević received the 127th position on its list, which was largely arranged in alphabetical order. He was again not initially selected for the party's assembly delegation but was awarded a mandate on September 2, 2008, as a replacement for Miloš Simonović. The Democratic Party was the leading force in the government of Serbia during this period, and Milisavljević served as part of its parliamentary majority.

Serbia's electoral system was reformed in 2011, such that parliamentary mandates were awarded in numerical order to candidates on successful lists. Milisavljević received the forty-ninth position on the Democratic Party's Choice for a Better Life list and was re-elected when the list won sixty-seven mandates. The Serbian Progressive Party and the Socialist Party of Serbia formed a new coalition government after the election, and the Democratic Party moved into opposition. In 2013, Milisavljević proposed that the government of Serbia sell its high-powered Mercedes, Audi, and BMW cars in favour of the Fiat 500L model produced in Kragujevac. This proposal received some attention in the Italian media.

Milisavljević was promoted to the twenty-second position on the Democratic Party's list in the 2014 parliamentary election and narrowly missed direct election when the list fell to only nineteen seats. After a brief absence, he returned to parliament on April 26, 2014, as a replacement for Miodrag Stojković. He was further promoted to the seventeenth position on the Democratic Party's list in the 2016 parliamentary election and once again missed direct election when the list won sixteen seats. He returned to parliament for a fourth term on April 21, 2017, as a replacement for Bojan Pajtić. The Democratic Party has remained in opposition throughout this time.

During the 2014 election, Democratic Party leader Dragan Đilas described Milisavljević as his party's main representative on health issues. He has proposed several health reforms, among other matters, and is currently a member of the assembly's health and family committee and of its parliamentary friendship groups with Austria, Germany, Greece, Switzerland, the United Kingdom, and the United States of America.
