= Vesna Marjanović =

Serbian politician

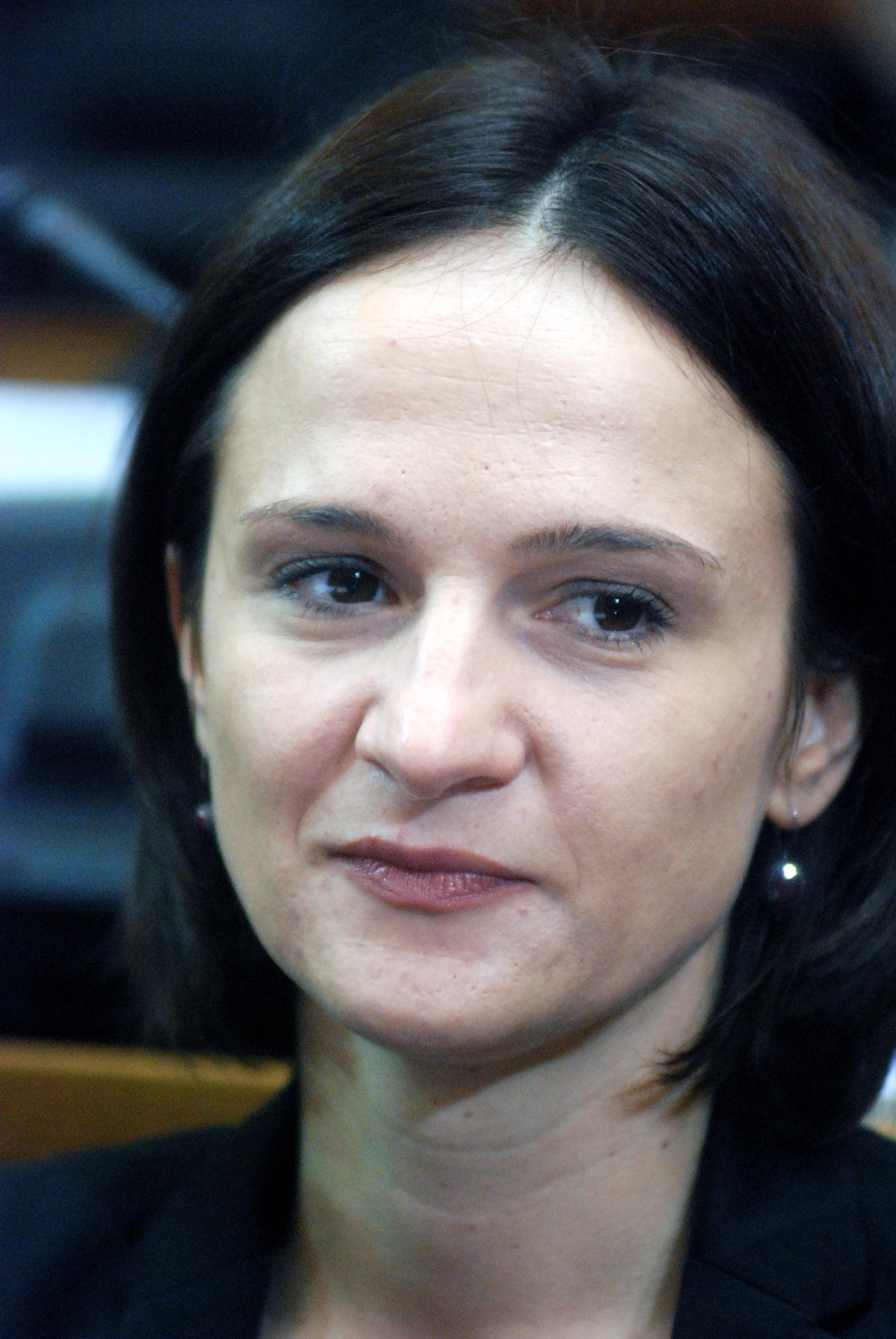
Vesna Marjanović in 2009.

Vesna Marjanović (Serbian Cyrillic: Весна Марјановић; born June 5, 1969) is a politician in Serbia. She has served as a member of the National Assembly of Serbia on an almost continuous basis since 2007 as a member of the Democratic Party.

== Early life and career ==
Marjanović was born in Belgrade, then part of the Socialist Republic of Serbia in the Socialist Federal Republic of Yugoslavia. She studied film and television production in South Africa, earned a degree from the University of Belgrade Faculty of Law, has been a co-ordinator of legal and educational programs at the Fond Centar za demokratiju, and has worked for the marketing agency Idols & Friends since 1996.

== Political career ==
Marjanović joined the Democratic Party in 1990 and served as personal secretary to Zoran Đinđić during his tenure as chair of the party's executive board. She later left the Democratic Party to join the breakaway Democratic Centre, was appointed as the party's spokesperson in 2000, and became chair of its executive board in 2003. In the 2003 Serbian presidential election, she was spokesperson and co-ordinator of the electoral staff for Democratic Opposition of Serbia candidate and Democratic Centre leader Dragoljub Mićunović.

The Democratic Centre contested the 2003 Serbian parliamentary election as part of the Democratic Party's electoral alliance. Marjanović received the forty-third position on the alliance's electoral list; the list won thirty-seven seats, and she was not selected to serve in the parliament that followed. (From 2000 to 2011, parliamentary mandates were awarded to sponsoring parties or coalitions rather than to individual candidates, and it was common practice for the mandates to be distributed out of numerical order. Marjanović could have received a mandate notwithstanding her relatively low position on the list, although in fact she was not.)

The Democratic Centre merged back into the Democratic Party on October 16, 2004, and Marjanović was named as vice-president of the Democratic Party's executive board following the merger. She was elected as a member of the Belgrade municipal assembly in the 2004 local elections.

=== Member of the National Assembly ===
Marjanović received the 138th position on the Democratic Party's election list (which was mostly arranged in alphabetical order) in the 2007 parliamentary election. The list won sixty-four seats, and on this occasion she was selected as part of the party's parliamentary group. The party joined a new coalition government after the election, and Marjanović served as part of the government's parliamentary majority.

She received the 109th position on the Democratic Party's For a European Serbia list (which was, again, mostly organized in alphabetical order) in the 2008 parliamentary election. The party won 102 seats and ultimately emerged at the leadership of a new coalition government; Marjanović again served as part of its parliamentary majority. She resigned from the assembly on April 12, 2011, upon being appointed to the Belgrade city council (i.e., the executive wing of the municipal government), and was replaced by Ljiljana Lučić.

Serbia's electoral system was reformed in 2011, such that parliamentary mandates were awarded in numerical order to candidates on successful lists. Marjanović received the forty-fifth position on the Democratic Party's Choice for a Better Life alliance in the 2012 parliamentary election and was returned to the assembly when the list won sixty-seven mandates. The Serbian Progressive Party and its allies formed a new government after the election, and the Democratic Party moved into opposition, where it has remained since this time. She was re-elected in the elections of 2014 and 2016, in which the party's lists won nineteen and sixteen seats, respectively.

Marjanović is a member of the parliamentary culture and information committee; a deputy member of the committee on the rights of the child; a member of Serbia's delegation to La Francophonie (where Serbia has observer status); and a member of the parliamentary friendship groups with Croatia, France, Italy, Norway, the United Kingdom, the United States of America, and the countries of Sub-Saharan Africa. She previously served as a substitute member of Serbia's delegation to the Parliamentary Assembly of the Council of Europe from 2012 to 2016 and was deputy chair of the assembly committee on culture, science, education, and media after the elections of 2012 and 2014.
