= Nebojša Ćeran =

Serbian engineer and politician (born 1964)

Nebojša Ćeran (Serbian Cyrillic: Небојша Ћеран; born 24 October 1964) is an engineer and former politician and administrator in Serbia. He was the mayor of the Belgrade municipality of Obrenovac from 2004 to 2008 and a member of the National Assembly of Serbia from 2008 to 2012, serving with the Democratic Party (Demokratska stranka, DS).

== Early life and career ==
Ćeran was born in Obrenovac, Belgrade, in what was then the Socialist Republic of Serbia in the Socialist Federal Republic of Yugoslavia. He is a graduate of the Faculty of Technology and Metallurgy at the University of Belgrade. After graduating, he worked for many years at TPP Nikola Tesla.

== Politician and administrator ==
=== Mayor and parliamentarian ===
Ćeran joined the DS in 2000. He appeared in the 194th position out of 250 on the party's electoral list in the 2003 Serbian parliamentary election; the list won thirty-seven seats, and he was not included in the DS parliamentary delegation. (From 2000 to 2011, mandates in Serbian parliamentary elections were awarded to sponsoring parties or coalitions rather than individual candidates, and it was common practice for the mandates to be assigned out of numerical order. Ćeran's specific position on the list had no bearing on whether he received a mandate.)

For the 2004 Serbian local elections, Ćeran was given the second position on the DS list for the Obrenovac municipal assembly. The list won thirteen out of fifty-five seats, finishing a close second against the Serbian Radical Party, which won fourteen. No party in the assembly came close to commanding a majority of seats on its own, and the DS was ultimately able to form a local coalition government with the support of other parties. Ćeran was chosen as mayor, serving in this role for the next four years. He also appeared on the DS's list for a second time at the republic level in the 2007 parliamentary election and was again not selected for a mandate after the list won sixty-four seats.

The DS contested the 2008 parliamentary election at the head of a coalition called For a European Serbia. Ćeran appeared in the 227th position on the list, which was mostly alphabetical. For a European Serbia won 102 seats, and on this occasion he was assigned a mandate as a DS representative. He also led the For a European Serbia coalition to a first-place finish in Obrenovac in the concurrent 2008 Serbian local elections, although he did not continue as mayor after the election and chose not to take a seat in the local assembly.

Although the 2008 parliamentary elections were initially inconclusive, For a European Serbia ultimately formed a coalition government with the Socialist Party of Serbia, and Ćeran served as a supporter of the administration. He was also appointed as general director of RB Kolubara in 2009 and served in this role for the next three years.

=== Since 2012 ===
Serbia's electoral system was reformed in 2011, such that mandates were awarded in numerical order to candidates on successful lists. Ćeran was given the 122nd position on the DS's Choice for a Better Life list in the 2012 parliamentary election and was not re-elected when the list won sixty-seven seats. He also appeared in the fourth position on the DS's list for Obrenovac in the 2012 local elections and was this time elected to the local assembly when the list won twelve seats, finishing second against the Serbian Progressive Party.

In September 2012, Ćeran was appointed as acting director of the Belgrade City Transportation Company. He served in this role over the following year.

Ćeran was arrested in September 2013, on the charge of embezzlement in the expropriation of land while serving as chair of Kolabura. Ćeran claimed innocence, saying that he prevented robbery in the amount of one hundred million euros during his tenure. He was also defended by DS leader Dragan Đilas, who charged that the arrest was politically motivated. Although the arrest attracted a considerable amount of media attention, online sources do not indicate if the matter actually went to trial.

In the 2014 Serbian parliamentary election, Ćeran received the fifty-fifth position on the DS list. The list won only nineteen mandates, and he was not elected. He has not sought a return to public office since this time.
