= Maja Videnović =

Serbian politician

- Маја Виденовић
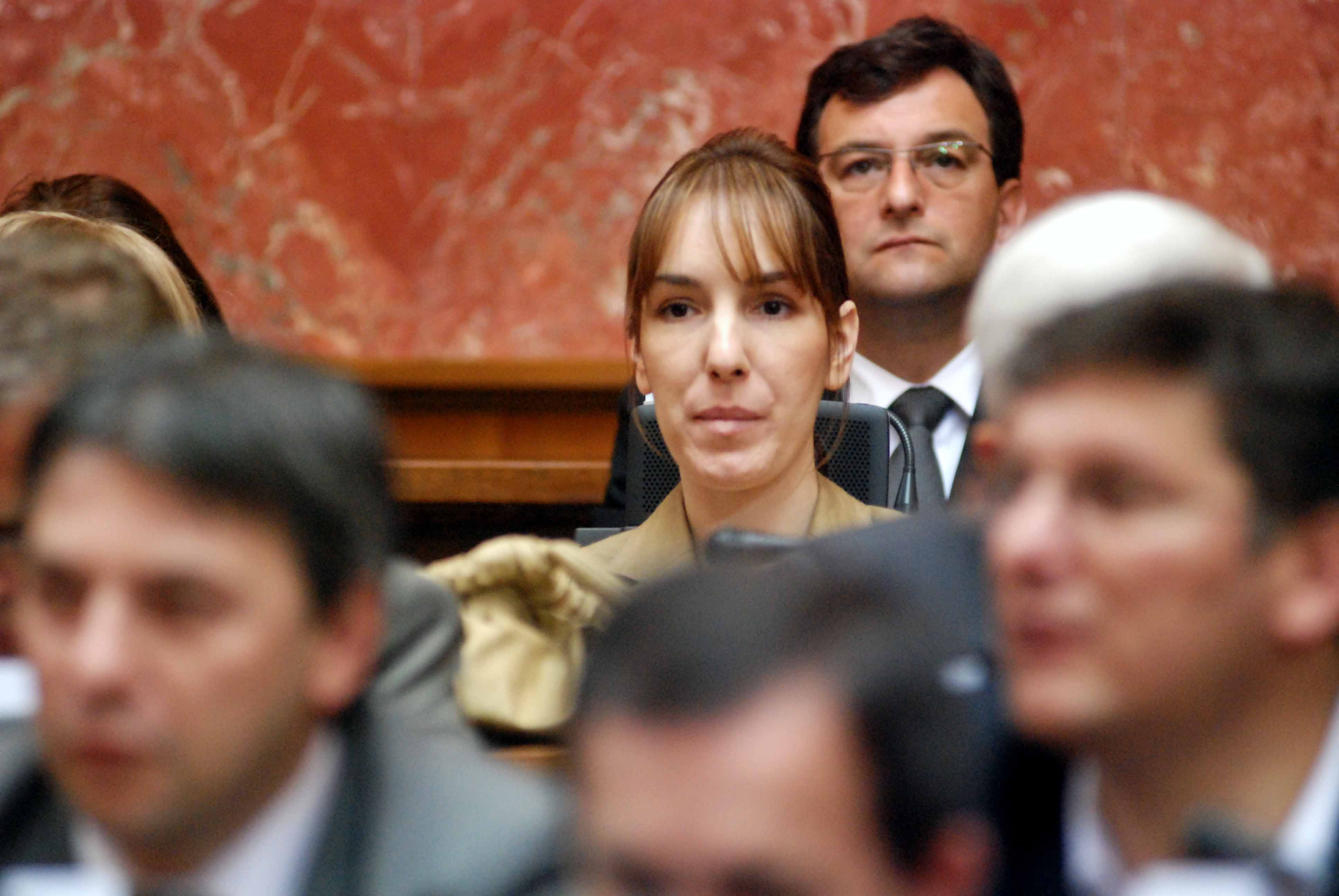
- Maja Videnović in 2009.

Member of the National Assembly of the Republic of Serbia
- In office 3 June 2016 – 3 August 2020
- In office 11 June 2008 – 16 April 2014

Member of the City Assembly of Belgrade
- In office 26 November 2004 – 14 July 2008

Personal details
- Born: 30 April 1979 (age 47) Belgrade, SR Serbia, SFR Yugoslavia
- Party: DS
- Education: University of Belgrade

Maja Videnović (Serbian Cyrillic: Маја Виденовић; born 30 April 1979) is a Serbian politician. She served in the Serbian parliament for most of the period from 2008 to 2020. During her time as an elected official, Videnović was a member of the Democratic Party (DS).

== Early life and career ==
Videnović was born in Belgrade, in what was then the Socialist Republic of Serbia in the Socialist Federal Republic of Yugoslavia. She participated in the 1996–97 protests against the government of Slobodan Milošević, organizing opposition events at her high school. She is a graduate of the University of Belgrade Faculty of Law.

== Politician ==
=== City and municipal politics in Belgrade ===
Videnović joined the Democratic Party in 2000. She was given the 173rd position on the party's electoral list in the 2003 Serbian parliamentary election and did not receive a mandate when the list won thirty-seven seats. (From 2000 to 2011, mandates in Serbian parliamentary elections were awarded to sponsoring parties or coalitions rather than individual candidates, and it was common practice for the mandates to be distributed out of numerical order. Videnović could have been assigned a seat despite her low position on the list, though ultimately she was not.)

Videnović later appeared in the twenty-sixth position on the DS's electoral list for the Belgrade city assembly and the eighth position on its list for the New Belgrade municipal assembly in the 2004 Serbian local elections. For this local election cycle, one-third of assembly mandates were awarded to candidates on successful lists in numerical order, and the remaining two-thirds were assigned to other candidates on the lists at the discretion of the sponsoring parties or coalitions. The Democratic Party won thirty-four seats in the city election and twenty-seats in the New Belgrade municipal election; Videnović was automatically elected to the municipal assembly and also received one of the optional mandates for the city assembly. The party won the election at both levels, and Videnović served as a government supporter.

She appeared in the forty-eighth position on the DS's list in the 2007 parliamentary election and once again did not receive a mandate, notwithstanding that the list won sixty-four seats.

Serbia's electoral system was reformed prior to the 2008 Serbian local elections, such that all mandates in local assembly elections, as in parliamentary elections, were awarded to candidates on successful lists at the discretion of the sponsoring parties or coalitions, irrespective of numerical order. The Democratic Party contested the 2008 elections at the head of an alliance called For a European Serbia (ZES); Videnović appeared in the twentieth position on its list for the Belgrade city election and the ninth position on its list for New Belgrade. The alliance won the elections at both the city and the municipal levels. On this occasion, Videnović did not take a mandate at either level.

=== Parliamentarian ===
Videnović was given the twentieth position on the For a European Serbia list in the 2008 parliamentary election and was awarded a mandate when the list won 102 seats. The overall results of the election were inconclusive, but For a European Serbia eventually formed a new coalition government with the Socialist Party of Serbia (SPS), and Videnović served with the government's parliamentary majority. In her first term, she was a member of the legislative committee and the committee on petitions and proposals; a deputy member of the administrative committee, the committee for constitutional affairs, the committee for culture and education, the committee for European integration, and the committee for gender equality; and a member of the parliamentary friendship groups with Italy, Portugal, the Sovereign Order of Malta, Spain, and the United States of America.

Serbia's electoral system was reformed once again in 2011, such that all mandates were awarded to candidates on successful lists in numerical order. Videnović received the fifty-third position on the Democratic Party's Choice for a Better Life list in the 2012 parliamentary election and was re-elected when the list won sixty-seven mandates. The Serbian Progressive Party (SNS) and the Socialist Party formed a new government after the election, and the DS moved into opposition. In the parliament that followed, Videnović was a member of the culture and information committee, a deputy member of the foreign affairs committee and the European integration committee, a member of Serbia's delegation to the Inter-Parliamentary Union assembly, and a member of the same friendship groups as in the previous parliament.

Videnović was promoted to the thirty-third position on the DS's list for the 2014 parliamentary election but was not re-elected when the list fell to nineteen seats.

She supported party leader Dragan Đilas against a challenge from Bojan Pajtić in 2014; Pajtić was successful in his challenge, becoming the party's new leader in a delegated vote on 2 June. On the same day, Videnović was elected as one of the party's vice-presidents. In 2015, she defended national ombudsman Saša Janković against accusations of bias from the governing Progressive Party.

Videnović was promoted again to the ninth position on the DS's list in the 2016 parliamentary election and was elected to a third assembly term when the list won sixteen mandates. The SNS and its allies won a majority victory, and the DS remained in opposition. In her third term, Videnović was deputy chair of the committee for human and minority rights and gender equality; a deputy member of the committee for the diaspora and Serbs in the region; the culture and information committee, the committee for European integration, and the security services control committee; a member of Serbia's delegation to the parliamentary dimension of the Central European Initiative; and a member of the parliamentary friendship groups with Croatia, France, Israel, Italy, Spain, and the United States of America.

The DS contested the 2018 Belgrade city assembly election in an alliance with the Social Democratic Party (SDS) and other parties, and Videnović appeared in the thirty-second position on its list. The list did not cross the electoral threshold for assembly representation.

Several opposition parties, including the Democratic Party, began boycotting meetings of the national assembly in early 2019, against the backdrop of significant protests against Serbia's SNS-led government. In an interview in early 2020, Videnović said that her only goal in politics was to defeat the SNS administration and ensure that Serbia returned to a path of integration with the European Union. The DS ultimately participated in an opposition boycott of the 2020 Serbian parliamentary election, and her tenure in the assembly ended that year.

In her last year as a parliamentarian, Videnović was aligned with a group of Democratic Party officials who were extremely critical of party leader Zoran Lutovac and the direction he was taking the party. Several members of this group were expelled from the party in September 2020. Online sources do not clarify if Videnović was among those expelled but, in any event, she has not returned to active political life since this time.
