= Slavoljub Mitov =

Serbian politician

Slavoljub Mitov (Serbian Cyrillic: Славољуб Митов; born 11 November 1961) is a politician in Serbia. He served in the National Assembly of Serbia for most of the period from 2007 to 2012 as a member of the Democratic Party (Demokratska stranka, DS) and is now a member of the breakaway Social Democratic Party (Socijaldemokratska stranka, SDS).

== Early life and private career ==
Mitov was born in Vlasotince, in what was then the People's Republic of Serbia in the Federal People's Republic of Yugoslavia. He has worked in the geriatrics department of the Leskovac General Hospital.

== Political career ==
Mitov joined the DS in 1996. He became vice-president of the party's Vlasotince municipal board in 1997, president of the party's Vlasotince executive board in 2002, and president of the local party organization in 2003. He has served several terms in the Vlasotince municipal assembly.

He received the 158th position (out of 250) on the DS's electoral list for the 2007 Serbian parliamentary election. The party won sixty-four seats. Mitov was not initially included in the party's assembly delegation but received a mandate on 22 May 2007 as the replacement for another DS member who had resigned. (From 2000 to 2011, parliamentary mandates were awarded to sponsoring parties or coalitions rather than to individual candidates, and it was common practice for the parties to distribute their mandates out of numerical order. Mitov's low position on the list – which was in any event mostly alphabetical – had no bearing on whether or when he received a mandate.) The DS formed an unstable coalition government with the rival Democratic Party of Serbia (Demokratska stranka Srbije, DSS) after the 2007 election, and Mitov served in parliament as a supporter of the ministry.

The DS–DSS alliance fell apart in early 2008, and new elections were called. Mitov received the 137th position on the DS's For a European Serbia list, which won 102 mandates. He was once again not initially selected for the party's assembly delegation but received a mandate on 16 July 2008 as the replacement for another party member. Following extended negotiations, For a European Serbia formed a new coalition government with the Socialist Party of Serbia; Mitov once again served on the government side for the next four years.

Serbia's electoral system was reformed in 2011, such that parliamentary mandates were awarded in numerical order to candidates on successful lists. Mitov received the 152nd position on the DS's Choice for a Better Life list and, as the list won sixty-seven mandates, was not re-elected.

The DS experienced a serious split in early 2014, with former leader Boris Tadić setting up a new breakaway group that was originally called the New Democratic Party. This party contested the 2014 Serbian parliamentary election in a fusion with the Greens of Serbia and in alliance with other parties. Mitov sided with Tadić in the split – bringing most of the Vlasotince party organization with him – and received the thirty-second position on the new coalition list; he missed re-election when the list won eighteen seats. The New Democratic Party re-constituted itself as the Social Democratic Party later in the year.

The SDS contested the 2016 parliamentary election in an alliance with the Liberal Democratic Party and the League of Social Democrats of Vojvodina. Mitov received the thirty-seventh position on the list and was not elected when the list won thirteen mandates. He continues to lead the SDS group in the Vlasotince municipal assembly.
