= Branka Karavidić =

Serbian politician (born 1958)

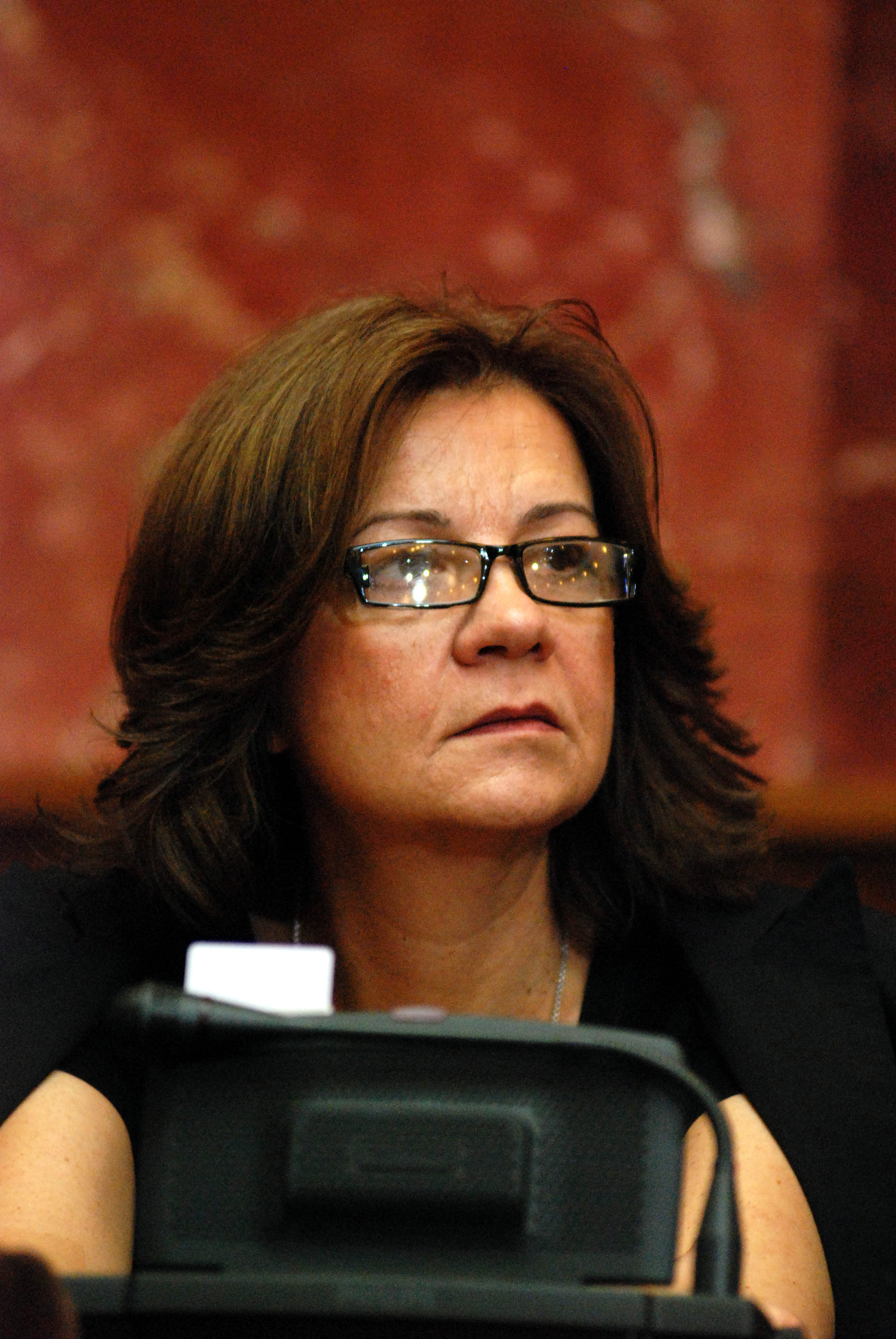
Branka Karavidić in 2009.

Branka Karavidić (Serbian Cyrillic: Бранка Каравидић; born 23 January 1958) is a politician in Serbia. She served in National Assembly of Serbia on an almost continuous basis from 2008 to 2016, initially with the Democratic Party (Demokratska stranka, DS) and later with the Social Democratic Party (Socijaldemokratska stranka, SDS).

== Early life and career ==
Karavidić was born in Pančevo, in what was then the Autonomous Province of Vojvodina in the People's Republic of Serbia, Federal People's Republic of Yugoslavia. She worked in technical preparation in the Majdanpek copper mine for twenty-six years and continues to live in that community.

== Political career ==
Karavidić joined the DS in 1991. In 2005, she became the leader of the party's Majdanpek municipal committee and a member of its main board at the republic level. She also served as deputy mayor of Majdanpek for a term beginning in the same year.

Karavidić received the seventy-sixth position on the DS's For a European Serbia electoral list in the 2008 Serbian parliamentary election. The list won 102 mandates, and she was subsequently included in its assembly delegation. (From 2000 to 2011, parliamentary mandates were awarded to sponsoring parties or coalitions rather than to individual candidates, and it was common practice for the parties to distribute their mandates out of numerical order. Karavidić's position on the list – which was in any event mostly alphabetical – had no bearing on whether she received a mandate.) After extended negotiations, For a European Serbia formed a coalition government with the Socialist Party of Serbia and other parties, and Karavidić served as a supporter of the ministry. She was a member of the assembly's committee on industry and of its parliamentary friendship groups with Croatia and Israel during this time.

Serbia's electoral system was reformed in 2011, such that parliamentary mandates were awarded in numerical order to candidates on successful lists. Karavidić received the sixty-ninth position on the DS's Choice for a Better Life list and, as the list won sixty-seven mandates, was not immediately re-elected. She was, however, awarded a mandate on 30 July 2012 as a replacement for Ružica Pavlović-Đinđić, who had resigned. The Serbian Progressive Party formed a new coalition with the Socialists and other parties after the election, and the DS moved into opposition.

The DS experienced a serious split in early 2014, with former leader Boris Tadić setting up a new breakaway group that was originally called the New Democratic Party. This party contested the 2014 Serbian parliamentary election in a fusion with the Greens of Serbia and in alliance with other parties. Karavidić sided with Tadić in the split. She received the twelfth position on the new coalition's list and was re-elected when it won eighteen seats. The New Democratic Party re-constituted itself as the Social Democratic Party later in the year and continued to serve in opposition.

The SDS contested the 2016 parliamentary election in an alliance with the Liberal Democratic Party and the League of Social Democrats of Vojvodina. Karavidić received the forty-second position on their combined list; this was too low a position for re-election to be a realistic prospect, and indeed and she was not re-elected when the list won thirteen mandates.
