= Milan Škrbić =

Serbian politician

Milan Škrbić (Serbian Cyrillic: Милaн Шкрбић; born 12 February 1960) is a politician in Serbia. He was a member of the National Assembly of Serbia from 2004 to 2012, serving with the far-right Serbian Radical Party (Srpska radikalna stranka, SRS). He later left the Radicals, joined the Serbian Progressive Party (Srpska napredna stranka, SNS), and served as the mayor of Apatin from 2017 to 2020. He is now the president (i.e, speaker) of the Apatin municipal assembly.

== Early life and private career ==
Škrbić was born in Apatin, in what was then the Autonomous Province of Vojvodina in the People's Republic of Serbia, Federal People's Republic of Yugoslavia. He graduated in economics, worked at the Apatin shipyard (where he led the procurement sector from 1993 to 2001) and was the co-owner and director of the company Daiva Inženjering Komerc for twelve years.

== Politician ==
=== Early candidacies ===
Škrbić became politically active in 1991. He ran unsuccessfully for the Apatin municipal assembly in the May 1992, December 1992, 1996, and 2000 local elections. He was the Radical Party's candidate for Apatin's first division in the 2000 Vojvodina provincial election and was defeated. He also appeared in the third and final position on the party's electoral list for Sombor in the concurrent 2000 Yugoslavian parliamentary election; the party did not win any seats in the division.

The 2000 Yugoslavian election saw the downfall of Slobodan Milošević's government, a watershed moment in Serbian and Yugoslavian politics. A new Serbian parliamentary election was held later the year, with the entire country counted as a single electoral division. Škrbić received the ninety-eighth position on the Radical Party's electoral list. The list won twenty-three seats, and he was not assigned a mandate. (From 2000 to 2011, mandates in Serbian elections were awarded to successful political parties or coalitions rather than individual candidates, and it was common practice for the mandates to be assigned out of numerical order. Škrbić could have been awarded a mandate despite his list position, but he was not.)

=== Parliamentarian ===
Škrbić was given the seventy-fifth position on the SRS's list in the 2003 Serbian parliamentary election. The party won eighty-two mandates, and this time he was included in his party's delegation when the assembly convened in January 2004. Although the Radicals won more seats than any other party, they fell well short of a majority and ultimately served in opposition. In his first term, Škrbić served on the finance committee and the committee for petitions and proposals.

Serbia introduced both the direct election of mayors and proportional representation for municipal assembly elections in the 2004 local election cycle. Škrbić was the Radical Party's candidate for mayor of Apatin and was defeated in the first round; he also led the party's list and was elected to the municipal assembly when it won seven mandates. The Radicals joined a local government led by the Socialist Party of Serbia (Socijalistička partija Srbije, SPS) after the election, and Škrbić was appointed as deputy mayor. He also ran for the Vojvodina assembly again in the concurrent 2004 provincial election and was defeated in the redistributed Apatin division. The direct election of mayors proved to be a short-lived experiment and was abandoned in 2008.

Škrbić received the fiftieth position on the SRS's list for the 2007 parliamentary election and was given a second mandate when the list won eighty-one seats. The Radicals were once again the largest group in the assembly after the election but still did not have a majority and remained in opposition. Škrbić served on the assembly committee on the Serb diaspora and the committee on labour, veterans' affairs, and social issues.

Another Serbian parliamentary election was held in May 2008 after the breakup of the country's governing alliance. Škrbić appeared in the sixty-first position on the SRS list and was once again given a mandate when the list won seventy-eight seats. While the outcome of the election was inconclusive, an alliance led by the Democratic Party (Demokratska stranka, DS) ultimately formed a coalition with the SPS, and the Radicals continued in opposition. Škrbić also led the Radical list for Apatin once again in the concurrent 2008 local elections; the list won eight seats, the Radicals remained in a local coalition dominated by the Socialists, and Škrbić was named as speaker of the assembly.

The Radical Party experienced a serious split in late 2008, with several members joining the more moderate Serbian Progressive Party under the leadership of Tomislav Nikolić and Aleksandar Vučić. Škrbić initially remained with the Radicals. In his third parliamentary term, he served as a member of the finance committee and the privatization committee.

Serbia's electoral system was reformed in 2011, such that mandates were awarded to candidates on successful lists in numerical order. Škrbić received the seventeenth position on the Radical Party's list. Seriously weakened by the 2008 split, the party did not cross the electoral threshold to win assembly representation.

=== Municipal politics since 2012 ===
Škrbić led the SRS list for Apatin in the 2012 Serbian local elections and was re-elected when the list won three mandates. He resigned from the municipal assembly on 13 June 2012. He later left the Radicals and joined the Progressives.

He appeared in the eighth position on the Progressive Party's list for Apatin in the 2016 local elections and was elected when the list won twelve seats, in the process achieving a narrow victory over the long-governing Socialistss. Following the election, he was chosen for another term as assembly president.

Radivoj Sekulić, who had been chosen as Apatin's mayor following the 2016 vote, stood down from the position in January 2017. Škrbić was selected by the assembly as his replacement and served in the role for the next three years.

In the 2020 Serbian local elections, Škrbić was promoted to the third position on the Progressive list and was re-elected when the list won a majority victory with twenty out of twenty-nine seats. He was chosen for another term as assembly president following the vote.

== Electoral record ==
=== Provincial (Vojvodina) ===
2004 Vojvodina assembly election Apatin (constituency seat) - First and Second Rounds
| Candidate | Party or Coalition | Votes | % | Votes | % |
|---|---|---|---|---|---|
| Dr. Živorad Smiljanić | Socialist Party of Serbia | 3,049 | 33.90 | 5,462 | 62.09 |
| Saša Dobrijević | Coalition: Democratic Party–Boris Tadić | 2,241 | 24.91 | 3,335 | 37.91 |
| Milan Škrbić | Serbian Radical Party | 1,564 | 17.39 | | |
| Milan Dražić | Democratic Party of Serbia | 1,404 | 15.61 | | |
| Slavko Ivanišević | Citizens' Group: For the Municipality of Apatin–Dr. Milka Zorić | 353 | 3.92 | | |
| Branko Popadić | Strength of Serbia Movement | 229 | 2.55 | | |
| Đorđe Manojlović | G17 Plus | 155 | 1.72 | | |
| Total valid votes | | 8,995 | 100 | 8,797 | 100 |
| Invalid ballots | | 377 | | 121 | |
| Total votes casts | | 9,372 | 36.11 | 8,918 | 33.09 |

2000 Vojvodina assembly election Novi Sad VII (constituency seat)
| Candidate | Party or Coalition | Result |
|---|---|---|
| Milan Žigić | Democratic Opposition of Serbia | elected |
| Milan Škrbić | Serbian Radical Party | |
| other candidates | | |

=== Municipal (Apatin) ===
2004 Municipality of Apatin local election: Mayor of Apatin
| Candidate | Party | First round | | Second round | |
| Candidate | Party | Votes | % | Votes | % |
|---|---|---|---|---|---|
| Živorad Smiljanić | Socialist Party of Serbia | | | 5,688 | 64.32 |
| information missing | | | | 3,155 | 35.68 |
| Milan Škrbić | Serbian Radical Party | | | | |
| other candidates | | | | | |
| Total | | | | 8,843 | 100.00 |

December 2000 Apatin municipal election Municipal Assembly of Apatin, Division 5 (First-past-the-post)
| Candidate | Party or Coalition | Votes | % |
|---|---|---|---|
| Drago Ćirić | Democratic Opposition of Serbia | 227 | 45.58 |
| Božo Korać | Socialist Party of Serbia–Yugoslav Left (Affiliation: Yugoslav Left) (incumbent) | 173 | 34.74 |
| Milan Škrbić | Serbian Radical Party | 98 | 19.68 |
| Total valid votes | | 498 | 100 |

December 1996 Apatin municipal election Municipal Assembly of Apatin, Division 13 - First and Second Round Results
| Candidate | Party or Coalition | Votes | % | Votes | % |
|---|---|---|---|---|---|
| Đuro Dražić | Socialist Party of Serbia | 223 | 40.11 | 242 | 61.27 |
| Milan Škrbić | Serbian Radical Party | 131 | 23.56 | 153 | 38.73 |
| Jovica Uzelac | Zajedno | 98 | 17.63 | | |
| Milan Majstorović | Citizens' Group | 59 | 10.61 | | |
| Petar Pribičević | Yugoslav Left | 45 | 8.09 | | |
| Total valid votes | | 556 | 100 | 395 | 100 |

December 1992 Apatin municipal election Municipal Assembly of Apatin, Division 13 - First and Second Round Results
| Candidate | Party or Coalition | Votes | % | Votes | % |
|---|---|---|---|---|---|
| Velimir Diklić (incumbent) | Socialist Party of Serbia | 213 | 33.39 | 236 | 63.96 |
| Milan Škrbić | Serbian Radical Party | 145 | 22.73 | 133 | 36.04 |
| Sveto Bajić | United Serbian Opposition | 122 | 19.12 | | |
| Vojislav Sunajko | Citizens' Group | 108 | 16.93 | | |
| Mira Blanuša | League of Communists – Movement for Yugoslavia | 50 | 7.84 | | |
| Total valid votes | | 638 | 100 | 369 | 100 |

May 1992 Apatin municipal election Municipal Assembly of Apatin, Division 13 - First and Second Round Results
| Candidate | Party or Coalition | Votes | Votes |
|---|---|---|---|
| Velimir Diklić | Socialist Party of Serbia | 261 | 283 |
| Milan Škrbić | Serbian Radical Party | 231 | not listed |
| Mira Blanuša | League of Communists – Movement for Yugoslavia | not listed | |
