= Pavel Marčok =

Serbian politician

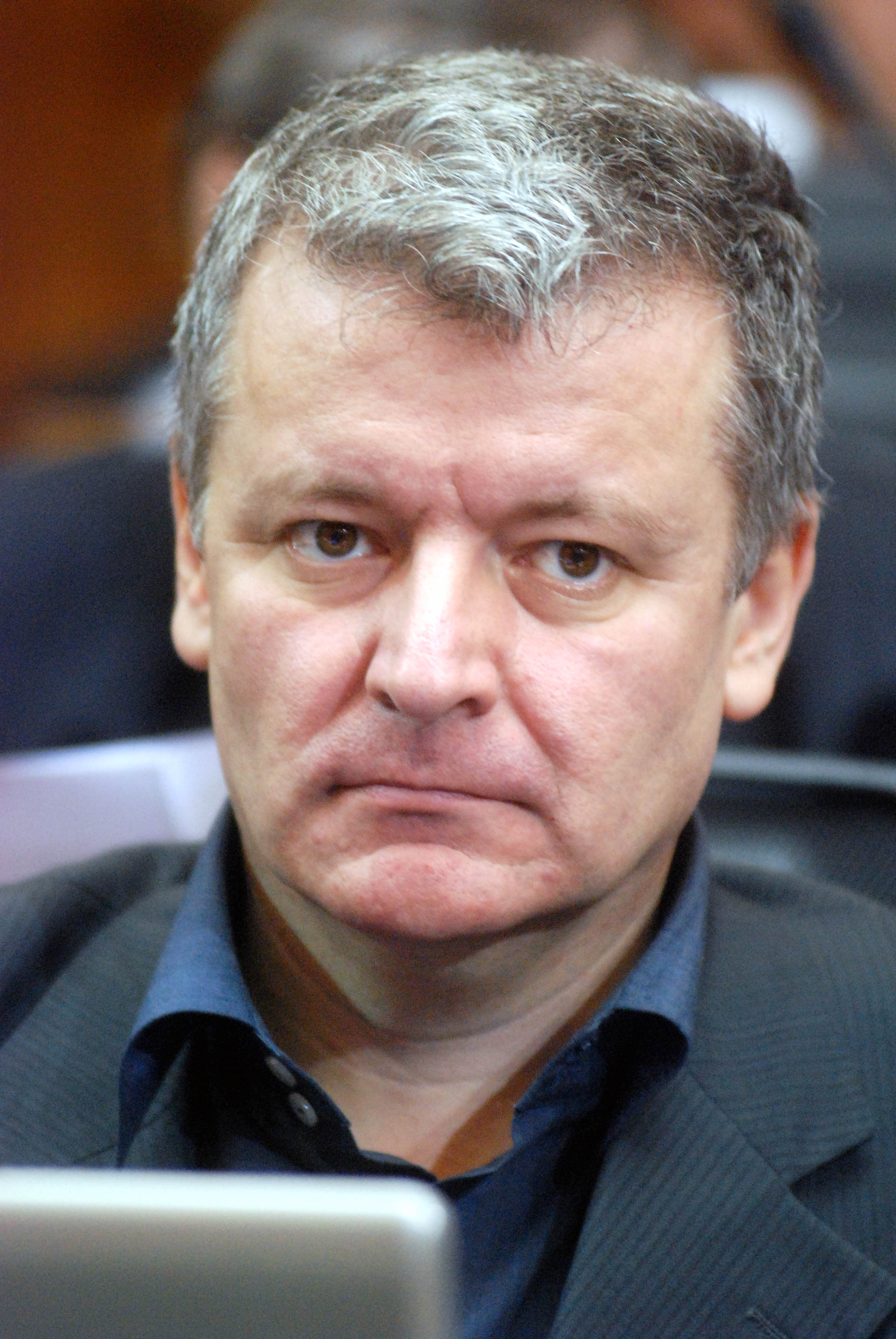

Pavel Marčok (Serbian Cyrillic: Павел Марчок; born 14 June 1968) is a politician in Serbia from the country's Slovak community. He was a member of the National Assembly of Serbia from 2007 to 2012 and was the mayor of Bački Petrovac from 2012 to 2016. During his political career, Marčok was a member of the Democratic Party (Demokratska stranka, DS).

== Early life and career ==
Marčok was born in Bački Petrovac, in what was then the Socialist Autonomous Province of Vojvodina in the Socialist Republic of Serbia, Socialist Federal Republic of Yugoslavia. He was raised in that community and educated in Novi Sad and Zrenjanin. He is a computer programmer and informatics teacher. He is also a chess enthusiast and has organized an annual international chess tournament in Bački Petrovac.

== Politician ==
Marčok was elected the Bački Petrovac municipal assembly in the 2000 Serbian local elections and re-elected in 2004. He was the assembly's president (i.e., speaker) from 2005 to 2006.

He received the 129th position on the DS's electoral list for the 2007 Serbian parliamentary election and was chosen as part of his party's assembly delegation after the list won sixty-four seats. (From 2000 to 2011, parliamentary mandates were awarded to sponsoring parties or coalitions rather than to individual candidates, and it was common practice for the mandates to be distributed out of numerical order. Marčok's list position had no specific bearing on his chances of election.) The DS formed an unstable coalition government with the rival Democratic Party of Serbia (Demokratska stranka Srbije, DSS) after the election, and Marčok served with its parliamentary majority.

The DS–DSS alliance fell apart in early 2008, and new elections were held in May of that year. Marčok was included on the DS-led For a European Serbia list and was chosen for a second mandate after the list won 102 seats. The results of this election were initially inconclusive, but the For a European Serbia alliance eventually formed a new administration with the Socialist Party of Serbia and other parties, and Marčok continued to support the administration in the assembly, as well as serving as deputy chair of the committee for science and technological development and leading Serbia's parliamentary friendship group with the Czech Republic. He was also re-elected to the Bački Petrovac municipal assembly in the 2008 Serbian local elections, after appearing in the lead position on the DS's list.

Serbia's electoral system was reformed in 2011, such that parliamentary mandates were awarded in numerical order to candidates on successful lists. Marčok was given the ninety-fifth position on the DS's Choice for a Better Life list and was not returned when the list won sixty-seven mandates. He was, however, re-elected to the Bački Petrovac assembly in the concurrent 2012 local elections (once again at the head of the DS list) and became mayor of the municipality when the DS formed a local coalition government after the election.

Marčok once again led the DS list for Bački Petrovac in the 2016 local elections. On this occasion, the DS won only five seats and the election was won by the Serbian Progressive Party and its allies; Marčok's term as mayor came to an end in June 2016. He was also a candidate in the concurrent 2016 Vojvodina provincial election, appearing in the fifty-second position on the DS's list; the list won ten mandates and he was not elected. He remained a member of municipal assembly until the 2020 local elections, which the DS boycotted.

Marčok has also served on Serbia's Slovak National Council and chaired its committee for the official use of language and scripts. He appeared in the fifth position on Katarína Melegová Melichová's Mother of Slovakia in Serbia–For Slovak Identity list in the 2014 national council elections and was elected when the list won six mandates. He was not a candidate for re-election in 2018.
