= Zoran Kasalović =

Serbian politician

- Зоран Касаловић

Secretary of State in the Serbian Ministry of Education, Science, and Technological Development

Mayor of Žitište
- In office 2004–2008

Member of the National Assembly of Serbia
- In office 2008–2014

Deputy Provincial Secretary of Finance
- In office 2016–2017

State Secretary in the Serbian Ministry of Public Administration and Local Self-Government
- In office 2017–2020

State Secretary in the Serbian Ministry of Education, Science, and Technological Development
- Incumbent
- Assumed office 2020

Personal details
- Born: June 15, 1967 (age 58)
- Party: Socialist Party of Serbia (SPS)
- Education: University of Belgrade Faculty of Economics
- Alma mater: University of Belgrade Faculty of Economics, Faculty of Law
- Occupation: Politician, Administrator

Zoran Kasalović (Serbian Cyrillic: Зоран Касаловић; born 15 June 1967) is a politician and administrator in Serbia. He was the mayor of Žitište from 2004 to 2008, served in the National Assembly of Serbia from 2008 to 2014, and is currently a secretary of state in the Serbian ministry of education, science, and technological development. Kasalović is a member of the Socialist Party of Serbia (Socijalistička partija Srbije, SPS).

== Early life and career ==
Kasalović was born in 1967. He is a graduate of the University of Belgrade Faculty of Economics and has completed a specialist post-graduate course from the Faculty of Law. He has worked in private life as a tax advisor in Serbia's public revenue administration.

== Politician ==
=== Local politics ===
Kasalović has served several terms in the Žitište municipal assembly. He first elected in the 1996 Serbian local elections, in which the SPS won a majority government in the community.

Serbia introduced the direct election of mayors in the 2004 local elections. Kasalović ran as the SPS's candidate and narrowly won the second round of voting. There was initially some controversy as to the result; the second-round results were annulled by a municipal court in Zrenjanin, and Kasalović was again elected by a narrow margin in a repeat vote. He served in office for the next four years.

The direct election of mayors was subsequently abandoned. Kasalović led the SPS's electoral list for Žitište in the 2008 local elections and received a new assembly mandate after the list won three out of thirty-one seats. After the election, the SPS participated in a local coalition government led by the Democratic Party (Demokratska stranka, DS). Kasalović later appeared in the sixth position on the SPS's list in the 2012 local elections and was again elected when the list won eight mandates. The SPS was initially a dominant party in the local government after this election, though it moved into opposition in 2013.

Kasalović returned to the lead position on the SPS's list for the 2016 local elections and was re-elected when the list won six mandates. The SPS participated in a local government led by the Serbian Progressive Party (Srpska napredna stranka, SNS) after this election, and Kasalović was chosen as president (i.e., speaker) of the assembly on 20 May 2016. He resigned as assembly president on 17 July 2017 and left the assembly entirely on 22 December 2017, after receiving a position as a secretary of state in the Serbian government.

He again led the SPS's list for Žitište in the 2020 local elections, was again re-elected when the list won six mandates, and again resigned his local mandate (on 20 November 2020) after being appointed to a new secretary of state position.

=== National Assembly of Serbia ===
Kasalović appeared in the 111st position on the Socialist Party's list in the 2007 Serbian parliamentary election. The list won sixteen mandates, and Kasalović was not included afterwards in his party's assembly delegation. (From 2000 to 2011, Serbian parliamentary mandates were awarded to sponsoring parties or coalitions rather than to individual candidates, and it was common practice for mandates to be assigned out of numerical order. Kasalović's specific list position had no formal bearing on his chances of election.)

He received the 114th position on the SPS list in the 2008 parliamentary election and again did not initially receive a mandate when the list won twenty seats. The overall results of this election were initially inconclusive, but the For a European Serbia alliance led by the Democratic Party ultimately formed a coalition government with the SPS. Socialist Party leader Ivica Dačić and two other party members resigned from the assembly to accept cabinet positions, and Kasalović received a mandate as a replacement member on 16 July 2008. He served for the next four years as a supporter of the government.

Serbia's electoral system was reformed in 2011, such that mandates were awarded in numerical order to candidates on successful lists. Kasalović was given the thirty-eighth position on the SPS list for the 2012 parliamentary election and was re-elected when the list won forty-four seats. The SPS formed a new coalition government with the SNS and other parties, with Dačić in the role of prime minister, and Kasalović again served as a government supporter. He was given the fifty-fifth position in the 2014 parliamentary election and was not re-elected when the SPS list again won forty-four seats.

== Deputy Provincial Secretary and State Secretary ==
The SNS and SPS formed a new coalition government in Vojvodina after the 2016 provincial election, and Kasalović served as deputy provincial secretary of finance from 2016 to 2017. He was appointed as a state secretary in the Serbian ministry of public administration and local self-government in 2017, working with SPS minister Branko Ružić. Ružić was reassigned as minister of education, science, and technological development in 2020, and Kasalović joined him as a secretary of state in the new department. It was noted in a 2021 Danas article that he was earning a higher income than Rużić.

== Electoral record ==
=== Municipal (Žitište) ===
2004 Žitište municipal election Mayor of Žitište - Second Round Results (Repeat Vote)
Candidate	Party or Coalition	Votes	%
Zoran Kasalović	Socialist Party of Serbia	3,506	50.92
Darko Karan	Coalition: Democratic Party–League of Social Democrats of Vojvodina–Serbian Renewal Movement–Alliance of Vojvodina Hungarians–New Serbia	3,379	49.08
Total valid votes		6,885	100
