= Vitomir Plužarević =

Serbian politician

Vitomir Plužarević (Serbian Cyrillic: Витомир Плужаревић; born 3 February 1950) is a Serbian politician. He served in the National Assembly of Serbia from 1997 to 2012 as a member of the far-right Serbian Radical Party (SRS).

== Early life and private career ==
Plužarević was born in the village of Bingula in the Šid municipality, Autonomous Province of Vojvodina, in what was then the People's Republic of Serbia in the Federal People's Republic of Yugoslavia. He was raised in the community, graduated high school in Kraljevo in 1969, and became a forestry technician. He worked for several decades at the Fruška Gora national park.

== Politician ==
Plužarević appeared in the fifteenth position on the Radical Party's electoral list for the Novi Sad division in the 1992 Serbian parliamentary election. The list won ten mandates, and he was not included in his party's assembly delegation. (From 1992 to 2000, Serbia's electoral law stipulated that one-third of parliamentary mandates would be assigned to candidates from successful lists in numerical order, while the remaining two-thirds would be distributed amongst other candidates on the lists at the discretion of the sponsoring parties. It was common practice for the latter mandates to be awarded out of order. Plužarević could have been awarded a seat despite his position on the list, but he was not.)

He later appeared in the third position on the party's list in Sremska Mitrovica in the 1996 Yugoslavian parliamentary election. The party won only one seat in the division, and he was not elected.

=== Parliamentarian ===
==== Late Milošević Years (1997–2000) ====
Plužarević was given the third position on the SRS's list for Sremska Mitrovica in the 1997 parliamentary election. The list won four seats, and on his occasion he was given a mandate. The Radical Party won eighty-two seats in total, finishing second against the governing Socialist Party of Serbia (SPS). The SPS formed a new coalition government with the SRS and the Yugoslav Left (JUL) in March 1998, and Plužarević served as a supporter of the administration.

SPS leader Slobodan Milošević was defeated by Democratic Opposition of Serbia (DOS) candidate Vojislav Koštunica in the 2000 Yugoslavian presidential election, a watershed moment in Serbian and Yugoslavian politics. The previously dominant SPS fell from power, the Serbian government resigned, and the SRS moved into opposition.

Serbia's electoral laws were reformed in 2000, such that the entire country became a single electoral division and all mandates were awarded to candidates on successful lists at the discretion of the sponsoring parties or coalitions, irrespective of numerical order. Plužarević was given the eighth position on the Radical Party's list and was given a new mandate as the party fell to twenty-three seats. The DOS won a landslide majority, and the SRS served in opposition.

==== After 2000 ====
Plužarević appeared in the tenth position on the Radical Party's list in the 2003 parliamentary election and was given a mandate for a third term when the party won eighty-two seats. Although the Radicals were the largest party in the new assembly, they fell well short of a majority and continued to serve in opposition. Plužarević was a member of the committee for agriculture and the committee for environmental protection.

Again included on the SRS's list in the 2007 parliamentary election, Plužarević was chosen for a fourth consecutive mandate when the list won eighty-one seats. The party remained the largest in the assembly, fell short of a majority, and served in opposition. Plužarević was a member of the agriculture committee.

Plužarević received the fifty-first position on the SRS list in the 2008 parliamentary election and was again given a mandate when the list won seventy-eight seats. While the overall results of the election were inconclusive, a coalition led by the Democratic Party (DS) ultimately formed a coalition with the SPS, and the Radicals remained in opposition. Plužarević served on the committee for environmental protection and was a member of the parliamentary friendship groups with Indonesia and Slovakia.

The Radical Party experienced a split in late 2008, with several members joining the more moderate Serbian Progressive Party (SNS) under the leadership of Tomislav Nikolić and Aleksandar Vučić. Plužarević remained with the Radicals. He was not a candidate for re-election in 2012.

Serbia's electoral laws were again reformed in 2011, such that all mandates were awarded to candidates on successful lists in numerical order. Plužarević appeared in the forty-sixth position on the Radical Party's list in the 2014 parliamentary election. Weakened by the split six years earlier, the list did not cross the threshold for assembly representation.

In 2015, a court decision awarded Plužarević 637,000 dinars from the Serbian parliament for unpaid daily wages and holiday benefits between 2009 and 2012. Parliament had removed these benefits in 2009; Plužarević contended that this decision was illegal.

=== Provincial politics ===
Plužarević was the Radical Party's candidate for Irig in the 2000 and 2004 provincial elections. He was defeated on both occasions.

=== Local politics ===
Plužarević ran for Irig's thirteenth electoral division in the 2000 Serbian local elections. The party won seven seats in the local assembly; online sources do not indicate if he was elected. This was the last Serbian local electoral cycle in which assembly members were elected for single-member constituencies; subsequent electoral cycles have been held under proportional representation.

He ran for mayor of Irig in the 2004 local elections and was defeated in the second round of voting. He also appeared in the lead position on the party's list for the local assembly and was elected when the list won six seats. He served in opposition for the term that followed.

== Electoral record ==
=== Provincial (Vojvodina) ===
2004 Vojvodina provincial election: Irig
Candidate	Party	First round		Second round	
Candidate	Party	Votes	%	Votes	%
Radovan Ninković	Democratic Party–Boris Tadić	1,036	26.40	2,043	58.71
Vitomir Plužarević	Serbian Radical Party	1,002	25.54	1,437	41.29
Nenad Avramović	"Together for Vojvodina–Nenad Čanak"	838	21.36		
Jovan Dobrota	Democratic Party of Serbia	596	15.19		
Branka Radovanović	Socialist Party of Serbia	452	11.52		
Total		3,924	100.00	3,480	100.00
Valid votes		3,924	92.72	3,480	96.27
Invalid/blank votes		308	7.28	135	3.73
Total votes		4,232	100.00	3,615	100.00

2000 Vojvodina provincial election: Irig
Candidate	Party
Đorđe Misirkić	Democratic Opposition of Serbia (Affiliation: Democratic Party)
Vitomir Plužarević	Serbian Radical Party
other candidates	
Total

=== Local (Irig) ===
2004 Municipality of Irig local election: Mayor of Irig
Candidate	Party	First round		Second round	
Candidate	Party	Votes	%	Votes	%
Radovan Ercegovac	G17 Plus			2,278	64.22
Vitomir Plužarević	Serbian Radical Party			1,269	35.78
other candidates					
Total				3,547	100.00
