= Donka Banović =

Serbian politician

- Донка Бановић

Member of the National Assembly of the Republic of Serbia
- In office 27 January 2004 – 16 April 2014

Personal details
- Born: 5 August 1963 (age 61); Bijelo Polje, SR Montenegro, SFR Yugoslavia
- Political party: DSS (2000–2014); State-Building Movement (2014–c. 2017); Narodna (2017 or 2018–?)

Donka Banović (Serbian Cyrillic: Донка Бановић; born 15 August 1963) is a Serbian politician. She served in the Serbian parliament from 2004 to 2014 as a member of the Democratic Party of Serbia (DSS) and was later a prominent member of the People's Party (Narodna) in Belgrade.

== Early life and career ==
Banović was born in Bijelo Polje in what was then the Socialist Republic of Montenegro in the Socialist Federal Republic of Yugoslavia. Her family moved to the United States of America in 1969 and resided in Gary, Indiana, for a number of years before returning to Yugoslavia in 1978 and living in Bar, Montenegro. She graduated from the University of Sarajevo Faculty of Philosophy and worked in the city as a professor of English language and literature. In a 2007 interview, she described Sarajevo as a "particularly wonderful city," saying, "I have lived in many places, but I am still particularly attached to Sarajevo and I am very sorry that everything happened. Everyone said that a war could not happen in Sarajevo, and in the end, Sarajevo was the worst."

She moved to Bajina Bašta in Serbia in 1992 at the start of the Bosnian War. In 1994, she moved to Dimitrovgrad in the southeast of Serbia to work as a teacher.

== Politician ==
=== Democratic Party of Serbia ===
Banović joined the Democratic Party of Serbia in 2000.

==== Government supporter in parliament (2004–08) ====
Banović received the twentieth position on the Democratic Party of Serbia's electoral list in the 2003 Serbian parliamentary election and was awarded a mandate after the list won fifty-three seats. (From 2000 to 2011, Serbian parliamentary mandates were awarded to sponsoring parties or coalitions rather than to individual candidates, and it was common practice for the mandates to be assigned out of numerical order. Banović was not automatically elected by virtue of her list position.) She took her seat when the assembly convened in January 2004.

The DSS emerged as the dominant party in Serbia's coalition government after the 2003 election, and party leader Vojislav Koštunica became the country's prime minister. In her first term, Banović was a member of the committee for poverty reduction, the committee for relations with Serbs outside Serbia, and the education committee, the last of which she chaired from 19 August 2004 until the end of the assembly term.

The DSS fielded a coalition list with New Serbia (NS) in the 2007 Serbian parliamentary election. Banović again appeared in the twentieth position on the list and was awarded a mandate for a second term after the list won forty-seven seats. The DSS formed an unstable coalition government with the Democratic Party (DS) and G17 Plus after the election, with Koštunica once again in the role of prime minister. Banović served on the education committee and the committee on interethnic relations during this term. On 26 June 2007, she was appointed as a substitute member of Serbia's delegation to the Parliamentary Assembly of the Council of Europe (PACE).

==== Opposition member in parliament (2008–14) ====
The DS–DSS alliance broke down in early 2008, and a new parliamentary election was called for May of that year. The DSS once again fielded a combined list with New Serbia; Banović again received the twentieth position on the list and was given a mandate after the list won thirty seats. The overall results of the election were inconclusive, and the DSS initially held negotiations with the Socialist Party of Serbia (SPS) and the far-right Serbian Radical Party (SRS) about forming a new government. The talks were not successful; the SPS instead joined a coalition government with the For a European Serbia (ZES) alliance led by the DS, and the DSS moved into opposition. In her third term, Banović was deputy chair of the European integration committee, a member of the committee on poverty reduction, the leader of Serbia's parliamentary friendship group with Slovakia, and a member of the friendship groups with Bosnia and Herzegovina, Hungary, Japan, and the United States of America. Her term as a substitute member of Serbia's delegation to the PACE ended on 13 March 2009.

Serbia's electoral system was reformed in 2011, such that all mandates were awarded to candidates on successful lists in numerical order. Banović received the twelfth position on the DSS's list in the 2012 Serbian parliamentary election and was re-elected when the list won twenty-one seats. The Serbian Progressive Party (SNS) formed a new coalition government with the Socialists after the election, and the DSS remained in opposition. In her fourth term, Banović was a member of the education committee; (Note: Formally known by this time as the Committee on Education, Science, Technological Development, and the Information Society.) a deputy member of the foreign affairs committee, the committee for the diaspora and Serbs in the region, and the committee on the rights of the child; and a member of the friendship groups with Bosnia and Herzegovina, Canada, China, Cuba, Cyprus, Mexico, Montenegro, South Korea, and the United the States of America. She was elected as a vice-president of the DSS on 19 January 2014.

Banović was also elected to the Dimitrovgrad municipal assembly in the 2012 Serbian local elections, which were held concurrently with the parliamentary vote. The Progressives and the DSS ran a combined list in the municipality, which won four seats; Banović was one of two DSS candidates elected.

She was promoted to the third position on the DSS's list in the 2014 Serbian parliamentary election. The list fell below the electoral threshold for assembly representation, and she was not re-elected to parliament.

=== Since 2014 ===
Banović left the Democratic Party of Serbia in October 2014, citing dissatisfaction with the party's direction under its new leader, Sanda Rašković Ivić. Shortly thereafter, she joined with other former DSS members to create a new political party called the State-Building Movement, serving as one of its vice-presidents. This party was not successful and became dormant a few years later.

Banović later moved to Belgrade and, after the failure of the State-Building Movement, joined Vuk Jeremić's People's Party (Narodna). The party contested the 2018 Belgrade city assembly election as part of Dragan Đilas's coalition; Banović received the sixty-first position on the coalition's list and was not elected when the list won twenty-six seats. In October 2018, she was chosen as a vice-president of Narodna's Belgrade city board.
