= Milan Nikolić (Socialist Party of Serbia politician) =

Socialist Party of Serbia politician and businessperson

Milan J. Nikolić (Serbian Cyrillic: Милан Ј. Николић; born 18 May 1945–14 May 2012) was a businessman and politician in Serbia. The general manager of the home furnishing company SIMPO for many years, Nikolić served five terms in the National Assembly of Serbia and was at one time the chair of its privatization committee. He was a member of the Socialist Party of Serbia (Socijalistička partija Srbije, SPS).

== Early life and private career ==
Nikolić was born in the village of Ljiljance (now in the municipality of Bujanovac), in what was then the Federated State of Serbia in Democratic Federal Yugoslavia. He graduated with a bachelor of economics degree, joined SIMPO in 1971, and worked as head of sales, commercial director, and assistant general manager for commercial affairs. By 1985 he had become assistant general manager of the company, and in 1993 he became general manager. He was also a board member of the Yugoslav Chamber of Commerce and the Serbian Chamber of Commerce, and for many years he was the chair of the Balkan Committee for the Development of Small and Medium Enterprises.

== Politician ==
Nikolić was first elected to the Serbian national assembly in the 1990 parliamentary election, which was both the first to be held after multi-party politics was re-introduced to the country and the last in which members were elected for single-member constituency seats. He won election in Vranje's third division; the SPS won a majority government, and he served as a government supporter for the next two years. He did not seek re-election in 1992, and his term ended in early 1993.

In the 1997 parliamentary election, Nikolić appeared in the lead position on the Socialist Party's electoral list for the Vranje division and was elected when the list won five mandates. The Socialists won a plurality victory in this election and led a coalition government until the fall of Yugoslavian president Slobodan Milošević in October 2000; after this time, the SPS continued as part of an interim administration pending new elections. Nikolić served for a full term and was not a candidate in the December 2000 election.

Serbia's electoral system was reformed after the fall of Milošević, such that the entire country was counted as a single electoral division and all mandates were awarded to candidates on successful lists at the discretion of the sponsoring parties and coalitions, irrespective of numerical order. Nikolić appeared in the 151st position on the SPS's list in the 2003 parliamentary election and was given a mandate for a third term when the list won twenty-two mandates. The SPS was not part of Serbia's coalition government during the term that followed, but it provided crucial support to the administration in the assembly; as before, Nikolić served as a government supporter.

He appeared in the nineteenth position on the SPS's list in the 2007 parliamentary election and was again given a mandate when the list won sixteen seats. For the first and only time in his career, he served as a member of the opposition following the election. During this term, Nikolić was a member of the committee on economic reforms and the committee on development and foreign economic relations.

He was again included on the SPS's list in the 2008 parliamentary election and was chosen for the party's assembly delegation after the list won twenty seats. The overall election results were inconclusive, but the SPS ultimately joined a new coalition government led by the For a European Serbia (Za evropsku Srbiju, ZES) alliance, and Nikolić again served a government supporter. In his last term, he chaired the assembly's privatization committee, was a deputy member of the committee on trade and tourism, and was a member of Serbia's parliamentary friendship groups with Germany, Slovenia, and Turkey. He was not a candidate for re-election in 2012.

== Death ==
Nikolić died on 14 May 2012 at the Military Medical Academy in Belgrade following a long and severe illness.

== Electoral record ==
=== National Assembly of Serbia ===
1990 Serbian parliamentary election: Member for Vranje III
Candidate	Party
Sait Balit	Social Democratic Party of Roma of Serbia
Leposava Gagović	Serbian Renewal Movement
Miodrag Dimitrijević	Citizens' Group
Miroslav Nešić	New Democracy–Movement for Serbia
Milan Nikolić (***WINNER***)	Socialist Party of Serbia
Milan Stanisavljević	People's Radical Party
Miroslav Stanojković	Democratic Party
Total
