= Živorad Smiljanić =

Serbian politician

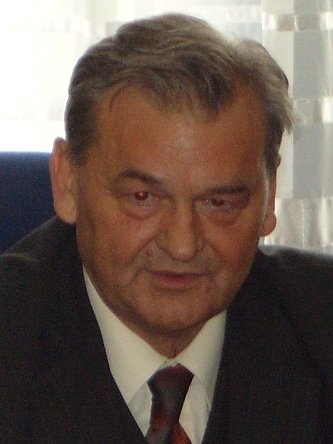

Mayor of Apatin
- In office 2004–2018

President of the Assembly of Vojvodina
- In office 9 January 1997 – 23 October 2000
- Preceded by: Milutin Stojković
- Succeeded by: Nenad Čanak

Personal details
- Born: 6 February 1942 Zaječar, SFR Yugoslavia
- Died: 14 December 2018 (aged 76) Apatin, Serbia
- Party: Socialist Party of Serbia

Živorad Smiljanić (6 February 1942, in Zaječar - 14 December 2018, in Apatin) was a Serbian politician, member of the Socialist Party of Serbia. Between 1997 and 2000 was the president of the Assembly of Vojvodina. Smiljanić has been the mayor of Apatin since 2004. He graduated the medical school and practiced medicine for 36 years as a gynaecologist.
