= Miroslav Petković =

Serbian politician

Miroslav Petković (Serbian Cyrillic: Мирослав Петковић; born 12 August 1968) is a politician in Serbia. He was a member of the National Assembly of Serbia from 2004 to 2014, serving with the Democratic Party of Serbia (Demokratska stranka Srbije, DSS). He joined the Serbian Progressive Party (Srpska napredna stranka, SNS) in 2019 and is now an assistant mayor of Čačak.

== Early life and private career ==
Petković was born in Čačak, in what was then the Socialist Republic of Serbia in the Socialist Federal Republic of Yugoslavia. He is a graduate of the University of Belgrade Faculty of Law and has worked for the company Niskogradnja.

== Politician ==
=== Parliamentarian ===
Petković received the forty-fifth position on the DSS's electoral list in the 2003 Serbian parliamentary election. The list won fifty-three mandates, and he was included in the DSS delegation when the assembly convened in January 2004. (From 2000 to 2011, parliamentary mandates in Serbian elections were awarded to sponsoring parties or coalitions rather than to individual candidates, and it was common practice for the mandates to be assigned out of numerical order. Petković did not automatically receive a mandate by virtue of his list position but was included the DSS delegation all the same.) The DSS emerged as the dominant party in Serbia's coalition government after the election, the Petković served as part of its parliamentary majority.

The DSS contested the 2007 parliamentary election in an alliance with New Serbia. Petković received a position on their combined list and was given a mandate for a second term when the alliance won forty-seven seats. The DSS subsequently formed an unstable coalition government with the rival Democratic Party (Demokratska stranka, DS), and Petković again served as a government supporter.

The DSS–DS coalition collapsed in early 2008 against the backdrop of Kosovo's unilateral declaration of independence. A new election was called for May 2008, and the DSS once again ran in an alliance with New Serbia. Petković appeared in the thirty-third position on their list and was selected for a third term when the list won thirty mandates. The election did not initially produce a clear winner, but the DS and its allies eventually formed a new administration with the Socialist Party of Serbia, and the DSS moved into opposition.

Serbia's electoral system was reformed in 2011, such that mandates were awarded to candidates on successful lists in numerical order. Petković received the fourteenth position on the DSS list for the 2012 parliamentary election and was re-elected when the list won twenty-one seats. The Serbian Progressive Party formed a new government with the Socialists and other parties after the election, the DSS continued to serve in opposition. Petković was a party vice-president in this period. He said in December 2012 that the DSS would be a part of Serbia's coalition government in the next year, although this did not actually occur.

Petković appeared in the seventeenth position on the DSS list in the 2014 parliamentary election; the list did not, on this occasion, cross the electoral threshold to win representation in the assembly. He was later given the twenty-eighth position a coalition list with the DSS and Dveri for the 2016 parliamentary election and was not re-elected when the list won only thirteen mandates.

Petković was re-elected to new terms as a DSS vice-presidents in 2014 and 2017.

=== Municipal politics ===
Petković has also been active in the municipal politics of Čačak, including serving as deputy president (i.e., deputy speaker) of the city assembly in the mid-2000s.

He became the leader of the DSS's Čačak city board in March 2016. The party joined a local electoral alliance with the Socialist Party of Serbia and United Serbia for the subsequent 2016 local election; Petković received the fourth position on their combined list and was elected to the city assembly when the list won five mandates. His term in this office was brief; he resigned at a meeting held on 7–8 July 2016, after being appointed as secretary of the assembly. Petković was proposed for this role by the governing Progressive Party rather than the DSS, and upon taking office he said that he would exercise his responsibilities in a non-partisan manner.

In 2018, Petković and another prominent local DSS official were expelled from the party after refusing to leave their roles in the city's Progressive-led government. Both subsequently joined the Progressive Party, and Petković continued to serve in the role of assembly secretary after the 2020 local election (in which he was not a candidate). In early 2021, he was appointed as one of Čačak's three assistant mayors, with responsibility for social activities.
