= Milisav Petronijević =

Serbian politician

Milisav Petronijević (Serbian Cyrillic: Милисав Петронијевић; born November 29, 1949) is a politician in Serbia. He has served in the National Assembly of Serbia on an almost uninterrupted basis since 2004 as a member of the Socialist Party of Serbia and has been the leader of the party's municipal organization in Belgrade.

== Early life and career ==
Petronijević was born in Belgrade, in what was then the People's Republic of Serbia in the Federal People's Republic of Yugoslavia. He is a mathematics teacher in private life.

== Political career ==
Petronijević joined the Socialist Party in 1990, upon its formation as the successor to the League of Communists of Serbia. He was the leader of the party's city committee in Belgrade from 2003 to 2009 and has been a member of the party's presidency since 2006.

He received the thirty-third position on the Socialist Party's electoral list for Belgrade in 1993 Serbian parliamentary election. The party won sixteen mandates in the city, and he was not included in its assembly delegation. (From 1992 to 2000, Serbia's electoral law stipulated that one-third of parliamentary mandates would be assigned to candidates from successful lists in numerical order, while the remaining two-thirds would be distributed amongst other candidates on the lists at the discretion of the sponsoring parties and coalitions. Petronijević could have been awarded a mandate despite his low position on the list, but, in the event, he was not.)

=== Member of the National Assembly ===
Serbia's electoral map was redrawn in 2000, with the entire country becoming a single constituency; in addition, the parties and coalitions whose lists crossed the electoral threshold were given complete discretion over which candidates appearing on their lists would be awarded mandates. Petronijević received the 179th position out of 250 on the Socialist Party's (mostly alphabetical) electoral list for the 2003 parliamentary election. The party won twenty-two mandates, and he was on this occasion included in its assembly delegation, taking his seat when parliament met in early 2004. The Socialist Party provided outside support to Vojislav Koštunica's administration in the parliament that followed.

Petronijević was again included on the Socialist Party's electoral lists for the 2007 and 2008 parliamentary elections and was selected for its assembly delegation on both occasions. The party served in opposition from 2007 to 2008.

In the immediate aftermath of the 2008 election, negotiations took place toward the possible formation of a new coalition government at the republic level by the Socialist Party, the far-right Serbian Radical Party, and the national conservative Democratic Party of Serbia (Demokratska stranka Srbije, DSS). Petronijević, as leader of the Socialist Party in Belgrade, took part in discussions with representatives of the Radicals and the DSS about forming a municipal government with the same partners. Ultimately, the Socialists rejected the Radicals and the DSS as coalition partners and instead formed a new governing alliance with the For a European Serbia coalition led by the centre-left Democratic Party (Demokratska stranka, DS) at both the republic and municipal levels. Petronijević served as part of the government's parliamentary majority.

Serbia's electoral system was reformed again in 2011, such that parliamentary mandates were awarded in numerical order to candidates on successful lists. Petronijević received the twenty-ninth position on the Socialist Party's electoral list in the 2012 parliamentary election and was re-elected to a fourth term when the list won forty-four mandates. After the election, the Socialists formed a new coalition government with the Serbian Progressive Party. Petronijević was again returned to parliament in the 2014 election.

Petronijević was given the thirty-third position on the Socialist list in the 2016 election and, as the list fell to twenty-nine mandates, was not initially re-elected. He was, however, granted a new mandate on October 5, 2016, as a replacement for Aleksandar Antić, who had resigned to continue in a ministerial position in the government of Serbia. The Socialist Party has remained in coalition with the Progressives throughout this time. Petronijević is a member of the assembly's foreign affairs committee and of its parliamentary friendship groups with Austria, Greece, and Russia.
