= Vladan Jeremić =

Serbian politician

Vladan Jeremić (Serbian Cyrillic: Владан Јеремић; born 29 November 1974) is a Serbian politician. He served in the Serbian national assembly from 2008 to 2012 as a member of the far-right Serbian Radical Party (SRS). He later left the Radicals to join the Serbian Progressive Party (SNS) and was mayor of Belgrade's Zvezdara municipality from 2020 to 2024.

== Early life and career ==
Jeremić was born in the municipality of Mladenovac in the city of Belgrade, in what was then the Socialist Republic of Serbia in the Socialist Federal Republic of Yugoslavia. He completed his elementary and secondary school education in Mladenovac and later obtained the title of economist for marketing and management. He worked in the news and sports departments of Radio Mladenovac from 2000 to 2004 and held commerce and marketing jobs in New Belgrade from 2004 to 2008.

== Politician ==
=== Serbian Radical Party ===
Jeremić appeared in the 154th position out of 250 on the Radical Party's electoral list in the 2008 Serbian parliamentary election. The list won seventy-eight seats, and he was included afterward in the party's assembly delegation. (From 2000 to 2011, Serbian parliamentary mandates were awarded to sponsoring parties or coalitions rather than to individual candidates, and it was common practice for the mandates to be assigned out of numerical order. Jeremić's low position on the list had no formal bearing on his chances of election.) The overall results of the election were inconclusive, but the For a European Serbia (ZES) alliance ultimately formed a coalition government with the Socialist Party of Serbia (SPS), and the Radicals served in opposition. Jeremić was a member of the industry committee, the committee on development and international economic relations, and the parliamentary friendship group with Greece.

Jeremić also appeared in the lead position on the Radical Party's electoral list for Mladenovac in the 2008 Serbian local elections, which were held concurrently with the parliamentary vote. The list won twenty seats, and he was given a mandate in the local assembly. Although the Radicals won more seats than any other party, they fell short of a majority and ultimately served in opposition at this level as well.

The Radical Party experienced a serious split later in 2008, with several prominent members joining the newly founded Progressive Party. Jeremić, at the time, remained with the Radicals.

Serbia's electoral system was reformed in 2011, such that all parliamentary mandates were awarded in numerical order to candidates on successful lists. Jeremić appeared in the fifty-sixth position on the Radical Party's list in the 2012 parliamentary election. The list did not cross the electoral threshold for assembly representation, and he was not re-elected.

Jeremić also appeared in the eleventh position on the Radical Party's list for the City Assembly of Belgrade in the 2012 local elections and, once again, held the lead position on the party's list for the Mladenovac municipal assembly. Both of these lists also fell below the electoral threshold.

The 2012 elections exposed further divisions in the Radical Party, particularly between party leader Vojislav Šešelj and spurned presidential candidate Aleksandar Martinović. Jeremić sided with Martinović and like him joined the Progressives in the aftermath of the vote.

=== Serbian Progressive Party ===
Jeremić worked in the restructuring of New Belgrade in 2013–14 and in the sales and procurement department for Belgrade's Official Gazette from 2013 to 2016.

He was given the eighteenth position on the Progressive Party's list for Zvezdara in the 2016 local elections and was elected when the party won a plurality victory with twenty-one out of fifty-three seats. The Progressives formed a coalition administration after the election, and Jeremić was appointed to the municipal council (i.e., the executive wing of the local government). He served in this role for the next four years.

Jeremić was promoted to the third position on the SNS list for Zvezdara in the 2020 local elections and was re-elected when the list won a majority victory with thirty-five seats. He was chosen as the municipality's mayor after the election. In a March 2021 interview, he said that resolving the status of Zvezdara's Fifth Park was his administration's top priority.

He was not a candidate in the 2024 local elections, and his term as mayor ended when a new administration was formed on 10 July 2024.
