= Jovan Nešović =

Serbian politician and administrator

Jovan Nešović (Serbian Cyrillic: Јован Нешовић; born 5 May 1970) is a Serbian politician and administrator. He served in the National Assembly of Serbia from 2007 to 2012 as a member of G17 Plus and has held high local office in Kraljevo.

== Private career ==
Nešović holds a master's degree in the technical sciences and has worked as an assistant at the Faculty of Mechanical Engineering in Kraljevo. He was listed as deputy director of the public energy company "Toplana" in 2019.

== Politician ==
=== City Manager ===
Nešović received the lead position on G17 Plus's electoral list for the Kraljevo city assembly in the off-year 2003 Serbian local elections and was elected when the list won nine seats. G17 Plus participated in a local coalition government after the election, and Nešović was appointed to the role of city manager.

He appeared in the 152nd position on G17 Plus's list in the 2003 Serbian parliamentary election, held one month after the municipal vote. The list won thirty-four seats, and he was not chosen for a mandate. (From 2000 to 2011, mandates in Serbian parliamentary elections were awarded to sponsoring parties or coalitions rather than individual candidates, and it was common practice for the mandates to be assigned out of numerical order. Nešović's place on the list had no formal bearing on his chances for election.) In March 2004, he was elected to the G17 Plus presidency.

In 2006, local representatives of the Democratic Party (Demokratska stranka, DS) accused Nešović of being in a conflict of interest by virtue of being on the management board of the privatized Wagon Factory while serving as city manager. Nešović denied the accusation, saying that he had "frozen" his membership on the board.

Nešović was dismissed as city manager in early 2007, against the backdrop of serious divisions between G17 Plus and New Serbia (Nova Srbija, NS) in Kraljevo's coalition government. He subsequently accused the city's mayor, Miloš Babić, of misleading the assembly over funding for road construction and called on him to resign.

=== Parliamentarian ===
Nešović received the 161st position on G17 Plus's list in the 2007 parliamentary election. The list won nineteen seats, and he was not initially included in his party's delegation. He was, however, awarded a mandate on 25 May 2007 as the replacement for another G17 Plus member. G17 Plus was part of Serbia's coalition government during this time, along with the DS and the Democratic Party of Serbia (Demokratska stranka Srbije, DSS), and Nešović served as a supporter of the administration. He was a member of the committee for traffic and communications and of the committee for local self-government.

The DS–DSS alliance broke down in early 2008, and a new parliamentary election was called for May of that year. G17 Plus contested the election as part of the For a European Serbia (Za evropsku Srbiju, ZES) alliance led by the DS; Nešović was given the 147th position on the alliance's list and received a new mandate when the list won a plurality victory with 102 out of 250 seats. The overall results of the election were inconclusive, but ZES eventually formed a new government with the Socialist Party of Serbia (Socijalistička partija Srbije, SPS), and Nešović continued to support the administration. In his second term, he was the chair of the committee for urban planning, a member of the transport and communications committee and the committee for relations with Serbs outside Serbia, and a member of the parliamentary friendship groups with Greece, Montenegro, and Russia.

He also led the ZES list for Kraljevo in the 2008 local elections, which were held concurrently with the parliamentary vote, and received a mandate after the list won a plurality victory with twenty-six out of seventy mandates. He resigned from the city assembly on 25 February 2009.

=== Since 2012 ===
Serbia's electoral system was reformed in 2011, such that all mandates were awarded to candidates on successful lists in numerical order. G17 Plus contested the 2012 parliamentary election at the head of the United Regions of Serbia (Ujedinjeni regioni Srbije, URS) alliance. Nešović received the twenty-ninth position on the alliance's list and was not re-elected when the list won sixteen seats. He also led the URS list for the concurrent 2012 local elections in Kraljevo and won another term when the list won six mandates.

G17 Plus formally merged into the United Regions of Serbia in 2013, and Nešović became a member of the latter party. He appeared in the forty-first position on the URS list in the 2014 parliamentary election; the list did not cross the electoral threshold for assembly representation. The party largely became dormant after the election and dissolved in 2015.

Nešović received the fourth position on a coalition list led by the DS in the 2016 local elections and was re-elected when the list won four mandates. He was not a candidate in 2020.
