= Nikola Savić =

Serbian politician

Nikola Savić (Serbian Cyrillic: Никола Савић; born April 9, 1959) is a politician in Serbia. He is currently serving his third term in the National Assembly of Serbia as a member of the far-right Serbian Radical Party.

== Private career ==
Savić lives in Niš. He is a graduate of the University of Niš Faculty of Mechanical Engineering and is a technical school teacher in the city.

== Political career ==
Savić has been chair of the Radical Party's municipal board in Palilula, Niš since 2004.

He received the 123rd position on the Radical Party's electoral list for the 2007 Serbian parliamentary election. The party won eighty-one seats, and Savić was awarded a mandate. (From 2000 to 2011, Serbian parliamentary mandates were awarded to sponsoring parties or coalitions rather than to individual candidates, and it was common practice for mandates to be awarded out of numerical order. Savić's relatively low position did not prevent him from receiving a mandate.) Although the Radical Party won more seats than any other party, it fell well short of a majority and ultimately served in opposition.

Savić received the sixty-ninth position on the Radical Party's list in the 2008 parliamentary election. The party won seventy-eight seats, and he was again awarded a mandate. The party continued to serve in opposition.

Serbia's electoral system was reformed in 2011, such that parliamentary mandates were awarded in numerical order to candidates on successful lists. Savić received the sixty-eighth position on the Radical Party's list in the 2012 parliamentary election. The party failed to cross the electoral threshold to win representation in the assembly. He was promoted to the eleventh position in the 2014 election, in which the party once again failed to win representation.

The Radicals returned to parliament with the 2016 election, winning twenty-two mandates. Savić, who received the sixteenth position on the party's list, was elected to a third term. He is currently a member of the assembly's foreign affairs committee; a deputy member of the culture and information committee and the committee on education, science, technological development, and the information society; and a member of the parliamentary friendship groups with Georgia and Russia. The Radical Party again serves in opposition.

Savić led the Radical Party's electoral list for the Niš municipal assembly in the 2016 local elections. Following the election, he led the Radicals into a local coalition with the Serbian Progressive Party and the Socialist Party of Serbia, even though the Radicals are rivals to these parties at the republic level. Savić currently leads the five-member delegation in the Niš municipal assembly.
