= Đuro Perić =

Serbian politician (1930–2021)

Đuro Perić (Serbian Cyrillic: Ђуро Перић; 10 January 1930 – 26 October 2021) was a Serbian politician and administrator. He was president of the Association of Pensioners of Serbia for several years and served two terms in the National Assembly of Serbia as a member of the Party of United Pensioners of Serbia (PUPS).

== Early life, private career, and administrative work ==
Perić held a Bachelor of Laws degree. He worked as a cryptologist in the Yugoslavian security services and on one occasion was assigned to work closely with President Tito on a state visit to newly independent countries in Africa. Perić said that one of his decryptions prevented a significant act of industrial sabotage by Ustaše exiles in 1952.

Perić joined the management board of Serbia's Pension and Disability Insurance Fund in February 2008. He became president of the board in 2010, although he was required to resign shortly thereafter to avoid being in a conflict-of-interest situation as a member of parliament. He also served as president of the Association of Pensioners of Serbia in this time; in 2011, he complained that large numbers of employers either did not pay pension contributions or paid less than the required amount. He remained active with the association after stepping down as president and in 2019 advocated for pension reform along a Swiss model, in which pensions would be harmonized fifty per cent with retail price increases and fifty per cent with salary increases.

== Political career ==
Perić served at one time as president (i.e., mayor) of the Belgrade municipality of Zvezdara.

The PUPS contested the 2007 Serbian parliamentary election in an alliance with the Social Democratic Party, and Perić received the 162nd position out of 250 on their combined electoral list. From 2000 to 2011, parliamentary mandates were distributed at the discretion of successful parties or alliances, and it was common practice for the mandates to be awarded out of numerical order. Perić's specific position on the list had no bearing on whether or not he would be elected. The list did not, in any event, cross the electoral threshold to win representation in the assembly.

The PUPS subsequently formed an alliance with the Socialist Party of Serbia for the 2008 Serbian parliamentary election, and Perić was included on the Socialist-led list, which won twenty mandates. He was not initially selected for his party's assembly delegation but was awarded a mandate on 16 July 2008 when PUPS leader Jovan Krkobabić resigned to take a cabinet position in Serbia's coalition government. Perić served for the next four years as a supporter of the government. In late 2008, he threatened that the PUPS would leave the government unless pensions were increased by ten per cent. He did not seek re-election in 2012.

He was elected as deputy president of the PUPS in 2018.

The PUPS contested the 2020 Serbian parliamentary election on the Serbian Progressive Party's Aleksandar Vučić — For Our Children list. Perić received the forty-fifth position on the list and was elected to a second term when the list won a landslide majority with 188 mandates. (In 2011, Serbia's electoral system was reformed such that mandates were awarded to candidates on successful lists in numerical order.) He was a member of the assembly committee on constitutional and legislative issues, a deputy member of the health and family committee, and a member of Serbia's parliamentary friendship groups with Austria, Bosnia and Herzegovina, Bulgaria, Croatia, Hungary, Italy, Montenegro, North Macedonia, and Slovenia.

Some media outlets have identified Perić as the oldest member of the parliament elected in 2020. He was not formally recognized as such, which would have given him the right to serve as acting president as the assembly prior to the election of a full-time speaker. Smilja Tišma, who was elected on the Socialist Party list as an independent candidate, was born on 9 June 1929 according to her birth certificate, which the assembly recognizes as definitive. Tišma, however, has said that the certificate is not accurate and that she was likely born in the early 1930s. If this is correct, Perić would have been the oldest member.

== Death ==
Perić moved to a nursing home in 2021, where he contracted COVID-19. He died at the COVID centre in Batajnica on 26 October 2021.
