= Arsen Đurić =

Serbian politician (born 1973)

Arsen Đurić (Serbian Cyrillic: Арсен Ђурић; born 7 August 1973) is a politician in Serbia. He served in the National Assembly of Serbia from 2004 to 2012 and is now the president (i.e., speaker) of the municipal assembly of Čajetina. A member of the Democratic Party of Serbia (Demokratska stranka Srbije, DSS) for many years, Đurić is now a member of Healthy Serbia (Zdrava Srbija, ZS).

== Early life and career ==
Đurić was born in Užice, in what was then the Socialist Republic of Serbia in the Socialist Federal Republic of Yugoslavia. He is a graduated economist and undertook postgraduate studies at the Faculty of Tourism and Management in Belgrade during his time in parliament. He lives in Zlatibor in Čajetina.

== Politician ==
=== Parliamentarian ===
Đurić joined the DSS in 1994 and was given the thirty-eighth position on the party's electoral list in the 2003 Serbian parliamentary election. The list won fifty-three mandates, and he was included in the DSS delegation when the assembly met in early 2004. (From 2000 to 2011, mandates in Serbian elections were awarded to successful parties and coalitions rather than individual candidates, and it was common practice for the mandates to be assigned out of numerical order. Đurić did not automatically receive a mandate by virtue of his list position.) The DSS became the dominant force in Serbia's coalition government after the election, and Đurić served with its parliamentary majority.

The DSS formed an electoral alliance with New Serbia prior to the 2007 parliamentary election. Đurić received the seventy-eighth position on their combined list and was selected for a second term after it won forty-seven mandates. The DSS formed an unstable coalition government with the rival Democratic Party (Demokratska stranka, DS) after the election, and Đurić again served as a government supporter in the assembly.

The DS–DSS coalition broke down in early 2008, and a new election was called for in May of that year. Đurić was again included on the DSS–New Serbia list and was selected for a third term after it won thirty mandates. The results of the election were initially inconclusive, but a new coalition government was eventually formed by the DS, the Socialist Party of Serbia, and other parties. The DSS served as the opposition party.

Serbia's electoral system was reformed in 2011, such that mandates were awarded in numerical order to candidates on successful lists. Đurić received the forty-third position on the DSS list for the 2012 Serbian parliamentary election. The list won twenty-one mandates, and he was not re-elected.

=== Municipal politics ===
Đurić received the second position on the DSS's list for the 2012 Serbian local elections (which were held concurrently with the republic elections) and was elected when the list won a majority victory with sixteen out of thirty-one mandates. After the election, he was appointed as deputy mayor of the municipality, working with mayor Milan Stamatović. He resigned from this position in 2013, on being appointed as director of the Zlatibor Tourist Organization.

The DSS experienced a serious split in 2014, with several members – including Stamatović – joining the breakaway Serbian People's Party (Srpska narodna partija, SNP). Đurić remained with the DSS but continued his alliance with Stamatović at the local level. The SNP, DSS, and Party of United Pensioners of Serbia (Partija ujedinjenih penzionera Srbije, PUPS) ran a combined list for Čajetina in the 2016 Serbian local elections. Đurić received the second position on the list and was re-elected when the list won twenty-one mandates. He was selected for another term as deputy mayor after the election. In this capacity, he oversaw several major infrastructure projects in the municipality.

Stamatović left the SNP in 2017 and formed a new party called Healthy Serbia. This time, Đurić joined the new party. The ZS, DSS, and PUPS ran a combined list for Čajetina in the 2020 Serbian local elections; Đurić once again received the second position and was re-elected when the list won twenty mandates. He was chosen as speaker when the new assembly met at the end of June 2020.

Đurić also appeared in the seventh position on a combined electoral list of Healthy Serbia and Better Serbia in the 2020 Serbian parliamentary election, which was held concurrently with the municipal elections. The list did not cross the electoral threshold to win any seats in the national assembly.
