= Zoran Bortić =

Serbian politician (born 1965)

Zoran Bortić (Serbian Cyrillic: Зоран Бортић; born 15 February 1965) is a Serbian politician. He was a member of the Serbian parliament from 2008 to 2012 and has held high municipal office in Šabac. For most of his time as an elected official, he was a member of the Socialist Party of Serbia (SPS).

== Early life and private career ==
Bortić was born in Šabac, in what was then the Socialist Republic of Serbia in the Socialist Federal Republic of Yugoslavia. He is a food technology engineer and began working in Šabac's public health department in 1994.

== Politician ==
=== Early years in the local assembly ===
Bortić was first elected to the Šabac municipal assembly in the 1996 Serbian local elections. The Socialists won a narrow victory in the city and retained power under contentious circumstances; Bortić served as a supporter of the local administration.

The SPS dominated Serbian political life in the 1990s under the authoritarian leadership of Slobodan Milošević, who was defeated in the 2000 Yugoslavian presidential election and fell from power shortly thereafter. The party was also defeated in most of Serbia's urban centres in the concurrent 2000 local elections. In Šabac, the Democratic Opposition of Serbia (DOS) won fifty-three seats while a coalition of the Socialist Party and the Yugoslav Left (JUL) won twenty-two. Bortić was personally re-elected to the municipal assembly and served in opposition for the term that followed.

Bortić was given the thirty-second position on the Socialist Party's electoral list in the 2003 Serbian parliamentary election. The list won twenty-two seats, and he was not given a mandate. (From 2000 to 2011, Serbian parliamentary mandates were awarded to sponsoring parties or coalitions rather than to individual candidates, and it was common practice for the mandates to be assigned out of numerical order. Bortić could have been given a mandate despite his list position, though ultimately he was not.)

The Socialists fell to eight seats in Šabac in the 2004 Serbian local elections. Bortić was one of the SPS candidates elected and again served in opposition, while a coalition of the Democratic Party (DS) and the Serbian Renewal Movement (SPO) formed the local administration.

Bortić appeared in the twenty-first position on the SPS's list in the 2007 parliamentary election. The list won sixteen seats, and he was again not included in his party's assembly delegation.

=== Parliamentarian ===
Bortić received the thirty-ninth position on the SPS's list in the 2008 Serbian parliamentary election. The list won twenty seats, and on this occasion he was assigned a mandate. The overall results of the election were inconclusive, but the Socialists ultimately joined a coalition government led by For a European Serbia (ZES), an alliance dominated by the Democratic Party. Bortić was personally in favour of the coalition. During his parliamentary term, he was a member of the health and family committee, the environmental protection committee, the agriculture committee, and the committee for relations with Serbs outside Serbia; a deputy member of the education committee and the committee on international relations; and a member of the parliamentary friendship groups with the Czech Republic and Indonesia.

He was also re-elected to the Šabac municipal assembly in the 2008 local elections, which were held concurrently with the parliamentary vote. The Socialist Party's alliance won five seats on this occasion.

Serbia's electoral laws were reformed in 2011, such that all mandates were awarded to candidates on successful lists in numerical order. Bortić appeared in the one hundredth position on the SPS's list in the 2012 parliamentary election. This was too low for re-election to be a realistic prospect, and he was not elected when the list won forty-four seats. After the election, the Socialists formed a new coalition government with the Serbian Progressive Party (SNS).

=== Since 2012 ===
Bortić was re-elected to the Šabac assembly in the 2012 local elections, which were again held concurrently with the parliamentary vote. The Democratic Party won the election, while the Socialists won eight seats in a coalition with the Social Democratic Party of Serbia (SDPS) and initially served in opposition. The DS experienced a split at the republic level after the election, and a majority of the party's elected delegates in Šabac joined the breakaway Together for Serbia (ZZS) movement, which became the dominant force in the local government.

In the 2014 Serbian parliamentary election, Bortić appeared in the 171st position on the Socialist Party's list and was not elected when the list again won forty-four seats.

In March 2014, the Socialists joined the local coalition government in Šabac and Bortić became the deputy speaker of the assembly. He remained in this position after Nebojša Zelenović became mayor in June of the same year.

Bortić was dismissed as leader of the SPS's Šabac city board in June 2015. He described the decision as illegitimate and accused SNS leader Aleksandar Vučić of orchestrating the situation. Bortić ultimately left the SPS and established his own political movement, known as the Šabac Socialists. He remained as deputy speaker of the city assembly until the 2016 local elections.

During the 2016 campaign, Bortić highlighted his movement's commitment to left-wing values including the rights of workers and the rights of national minority communities in Serbia. The Šabac Socialists ultimately fell below the electoral threshold, and Bortić's tenure in the local assembly came to an end after twenty years. He has not sought a return to political office since this time.
