= Rade Ranđelović =

Serbian pilot (1962–2009)

- Born: 1962; Bajina Basta
- Died: 2009 (aged 46–47); Batajnica
- Burial place: Novo Groblje, Belgrade
- Military career
- Allegiance: Serbia
- Branch: Serbian Air Force
- Service years: 1985–2009
- Rank: Colonel
- Commands: Chief of the staff of 204th Air Base

Colonel Rade Ranđelović (Serbian Cyrillic: Раде Ранђеловић; born 1962, Bajina Basta, Zlatibor District) was the display pilot of the Serbian Air Force and the commander of the 98th Air Base. Ranđelović was killed in a MiG-29 crash which occurred on 7 July 2009 in Batajnica, Belgrade. A few days later he was buried with state honours and posthumously promoted to the rank of Colonel.
