= Zoran M. Nikolić =

Zoran M. Nikolić (Serbian Cyrillic: Зоран M. Николић; born 12 June 1967) is a politician in Serbia. He was a member of the National Assembly of Serbia on an almost uninterrupted basis from 2001 to 2012, serving with the Democratic Party of Serbia (Demokratska stranka Srbije, DSS).

== Private career ==
Nikolić is a forestry engineer. He lives in Šabac.

== Politician ==
=== Democratic Opposition of Serbia administration (2000–04) ===
The DSS contested the 2000 Serbian parliamentary election as part of the Democratic Opposition of Serbia (Demokratska opozicija Srbije, DOS), a broad and ideologically diverse coalition of parties opposed to Slobodan Milošević's administration. Nikolić was given the 168th position on the DOS's electoral list and was awarded a mandate when the coalition won a landslide victory with 176 out of 250 seats. (From 2000 to 2011, mandates in Serbian parliamentary elections were awarded to sponsoring parties or coalitions rather than to individual candidates, and it was common practice for the mandates to be distributed out of numerical order. Nikolić was not automatically elected by virtue of his list position, though he was included in his party's delegation all the same.) In his first term, Nikolić was a member of the committee on agriculture and water management.

The DSS became estranged from other DOS parties after the 2000 election and left the alliance in mid-2002 to join the opposition. The parliamentary mandates of several DSS members, including Nikolić, were nullified at the discretion of the DOS on 12 June 2002, although this decision was subsequently revoked and the mandates restored.

=== Koštunica administrations (2004–08) ===
Nikolić was given the ninety-first position on the DSS's list in the 2003 Serbian parliamentary election and was not initially given a mandate when the list won fifty-three seats. By virtue of its performance in the election, the DSS won the right to appoint twenty members to the federal Assembly of Serbia and Montenegro, and on 12 February 2004 Nikolić was given a new mandate in the national assembly to replace a colleague who had received a federal seat. The DSS emerged as the dominant party in Serbia's new coalition government following the election, with party leader Vojislav Koštunica serving as prime minister; Nikolić served as a supporter of the administration and was a member of the committee for relations with Serbs outside Serbia, the committee for development and international relations with foreign countries, and the committee for privatization.

In the 2007 parliamentary election, Nikolić was given the sixty-second position on a combined DSS–New Serbia (Nova Srbija, NS) list and was given a mandate for a third term when the list won forty-seven seats. The DSS formed an unstable government with the rival Democratic Party (Demokratska stranka, DS) and G17 Plus after the election with Koštunica again in the role of prime minister. Nikolić once again served as a government supporter and was a member of the committee for industry and the committee for agriculture.

=== Cvetković administration (2008–12) ===
The DSS–DS alliance fell apart in early 2008, and a new election was called for May of that year. The DSS once again contested the election with New Serbia; Nikolić received the thirty-eighth position on their combined list and was again selected for a mandate when the list won thirty seats. The overall results of the election were inconclusive, but the DS-led For a European Serbia alliance ultimately formed a coalition government with the Socialist Party of Serbia (Socijalistička partija Srbije, SPS), and the DSS served in opposition. In his last term, Nikolić was a member of the agriculture committee and the committee for relations with Serbs outside Serbia, as well as being a member of Serbia's parliamentary friendship group with Australia.

Serbia's electoral system was reformed in 2011, such that mandates were awarded to candidates on successful lists in numerical order. Nikolić received the thirty-second position on the DSS list and was not re-elected when the party won twenty-one seats.

== Since 2012 ==
In 2018, Nikolić criticized the Šabac municipal government for cancelling the Vinaver's Days of European Culture event and expressed skepticism about the activities of the Stanislav Vinaver Foundation.
