= Nebojša Ranđelović =

Serbian politician

- Небојша Ранђеловић
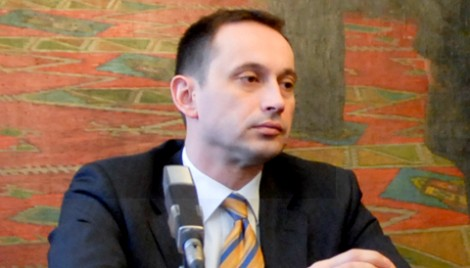
- Born: June 10, 1967 (age 59); Niš, SR Serbia, SFR Yugoslavia
- Education: Faculty of Law in Niš
- Political party: Currently: Social Democratic Party of Serbia; Formerly: Liberal Democratic Party

Nebojša Ranđelović (Born in Niš, June 10, 1967) is a Serbian professor at the Faculty of Law of the University of Niš, at the Legal-historical sciences desk.

== Education ==
He graduated from elementary school and high school in Niš. He studied at the Faculty of Law of the University of Niš, where he received the Bachelor of Laws degree in 1991. He later received the master's degree there in 1998, and then a doctorate in 2003.

== Career ==
In 1992 he got the position of the director of the Student cultural center in Niš. After that, in 1999, he became a teaching assistant at the Faculty of Law of the University of Niš. In 2004 he became an assistant professor. Then, in 2009, he became an associate professor, and after that a full professor in 2013. He was also a guest lecturer at the Faculty of Law of the University of Rijeka (Republic of Croatia) and the High studies of defense and security.

== State and social functions ==
From 2007 to 2012 he was a member of parliament at the National Assembly of the Republic of Serbia. In 2012 he became a councillor at the Assembly of the City of Niš, and in 2016 he became the mayor of Niš's assistant for high education. In addition, he was the president of the arbitration of the KSS. He currently serves as the state secretary in the Ministry of Education, Science, and Technological Development of the Republic of Serbia.

He is a vice-president of SDPS.

== Selected bibliography ==
- „Српски парламент на Крфу“, monograph
- „Српско државно тужилаштво 1804-2004“, monograph
- „Протоколи Париског конгреса – Србске новине 1856. године“, monograph
- „Историја права II – Основи српске историје права“, textbook
- „Основи уставне историје југословенских народа“, textbook
- „Одабрани извори из државноправне историје јужнословенских народа“, monograph
- „Србија и Турска од Париског до Берлинског конгреса“, monograph
- „Позив на прогон – антијеврејска и антимасонска кампања у листу Време 1940.“, monograph
