= Miloš Simonović (politician) =

Serbian politician

Miloš Simonović (Serbian Cyrillic: Милош Симоновић; born 31 May 1973) is a politician and academic in Serbia. He was a member of the National Assembly of Serbia from 2007 to 2008 and served as mayor of Niš from 2008 to 2012. Simonović was a member of the Democratic Party (Demokratska stranka, DS) for most of his political career, although he left the party in 2014. He is now an associate professor at the University of Niš.

== Early life and private career ==
Simonović was born in Niš, in what was then the Socialist Republic of Serbia in the Socialist Federal Republic of Yugoslavia. He was raised in the community and earned a bachelor's degree and a master's degree from the University of Niš prior to becoming a parliamentarian. He later earned a Ph.D. from the same institution in the field of automatic control and robotics.

== Politician ==
Simonović joined the DS in 1993. He was a student protest leader during the 1996-1997 protests in Serbia, which followed the refusal of Slobodan Milošević's administration to recognize opposition victories in several key jurisdictions, including Niš, in the 1996 Serbian local elections. The Milošević government eventually accepted the results, and a DS-led administration took office in the city.

Simonović received the twenty-first position on the DS's electoral list for the City Assembly of Niš in the 2004 Serbian local elections and was given a mandate when the list won eighteen out of sixty-one seats. (For this election cycle, one-third of mandates were awarded to candidates on successful lists in numerical order while the other two-thirds were distributed at the discretion of sponsoring parties or coalitions. Simonović's relatively low list position did not prevent him from being included in his party's assembly delegation.) The Democrats lost the mayor's office in this election and served in opposition for the term that followed.

=== Parliamentarian ===
Simonović was given the 205th position on the DS's list in the 2007 Serbian parliamentary election. The list won sixty-four seats, and he was subsequently awarded a mandate. (From 2000 to 2011, all parliamentary mandates were awarded to sponsoring parties or coalitions rather than to individual candidates, and it was common practice for the mandates to be distributed out of numerical order. The DS list was mostly alphabetical, and Simonović's specific position had no bearing on his changes of election.) The DS formed an unstable coalition government after the election with the rival Democratic Party of Serbia (Demokratska stranka Srbije, DSS) and G17 Plus, and Simonović served as a supporter of the administration.

The DS–DSS alliance broke down in early 2008, and the DS contested that year's parliamentary election at the head of the For a European Serbia coalition. Simonović was given the 195th position on the coalition's list – which was again mostly alphabetical – and was given a second mandate after the list won 102 seats. The overall results were initially inconclusive, but For a European Serbia eventually formed a coalition government with the Socialist Party of Serbia (Socijalistička partija Srbije, SPS), and Simonović again supported the administration. His second term in the assembly was, however, brief; he resigned on 1 September 2008 after becoming mayor of Niš.

=== Mayor ===
The DS led a list called For a European Niš at the city level in the 2008 local elections, which were held concurrently with the parliamentary election. The list won eighteen seats, finishing in a virtual tie with that of the far-right Serbian Radical Party (Srpska radikalna stranka, SRS). As at the republic level, the results were initially inconclusive, but the DS coalition ultimately formed a new government with the SPS (and also G17 Plus). Simonović was chosen as the city's mayor.

As mayor, Simonović sought to expand Niš's contacts with international investors and diplomats. He argued that the previous administration had left the city in a state of isolation from 2004 to 2008, and that his government's outreach efforts would reverse the city's economic decline.

He worked with Montenegro Airlines to set up a domestically registered air carrier in Niš. In July 2010, he said that Niš would set aside a combined six hectares of city land for the South Korean company Yura Tech and the Italian company Dytech Fluid Technologies to construct factories, in return for a combined investment of twenty-seven million Euros. In December of the same year, he announced that the French company Sagem would also start construction of a factory. He welcomed a private-public partnership between Philip Morris International Inc. and the Serbian non-profit Economic Expert Community Association in the same period, to aid unemployed residents of Niš in starting their own small businesses. In early 2011, he announced that Niš would transfer fifteen hectares to the Serbian-Italian company Ital Niš for the construction of a new leisure centre; in so doing, in indicated that the project would create around one thousand jobs.

In January 2009, Simonović argued that Niš and south Serbia generally had received inadequate compensation for the privatization of Naftna Industrija Srbije (NIS). This notwithstanding, he signed a strategic document with NIS the following year, committing the company to a policy of corporate social responsibility in supporting the city's efforts to provide a higher quality of living to its residents.

Simonović signed an agreement with the mayors of Sofia, Bulgaria, and Skopje, Republic of Macedonia in March 2010 for joint activity in the Euroregion EuroBalkans regional association. Later in the year, he signed a separate agreement with the mayor of Sofia for co-operation in emergency situations.

Serbia's electoral system was reformed in 2011, such that all mandates in elections held under proportional representation were awarded to candidates on successful lists in numerical order. Simonović received the second position on the DS's Choice for a Better Life list for Niš in the 2012 local elections and was re-elected to the city assembly when the list won fifteen seats. The Serbian Progressive Party (Srpska napredna stranka, SNS) won a plurality victory in the election and formed a new administration with the SPS and the United Regions of Serbia (Ujedinjeni regioni Srbije, URS). Simonović's term as mayor came to an end, and he indicated that the DS would be a responsible opposition party in the city assembly.

Simonović also received the 118th position on the DS's list in the concurrent 2012 Serbian parliamentary election and was not elected when the list won sixty-seven mandates.

=== After 2012 ===
The DS subsequently became divided into rival factions at both the republic and local levels. In February 2014, Simonović and five other assembly members resigned from the party. He was not a candidate for re-election in 2016.

In May 2014, Simonović was arrested on charges of corruption related to the lease of Niš's Vilin grad cinema. He was acquitted of all charges by the High Court in Niš in April 2017. Following the decision, he said that the charges against him had been politically motivated.
