= Choice for a Better Life =

Political coalition in Serbia

Choice for a Better Life Избор за бољи живот
- Abbreviation: IBŽ
- Leader: Boris Tadić
- Founded: 15 March 2012
- Dissolved: 2013
- Preceded by: For a European Serbia
- Succeeded by: With the Democratic Party for a Democratic Serbia
- Headquarters: Belgrade
- Ideology: Social liberalism Pro-Europeanism
- Political position: Big tent
- Slogan: "Job. Investments. Security" (Posao. Investicije. Sigurnost)
- National Assembly (2012): 67 / 250

Website
- izborzaboljizivot.rs

Choice for a Better Life (Serbian: Избор за бољи живот, romanized: Izbor za bolji život) was a political coalition in Serbia, headed by Boris Tadić and his Democratic Party. They competed in the 2012 parliamentary election and won 22.07% of the popular vote. In the presidential election of the same year, Tadić won a plurality of votes in the first round, but narrowly lost to Tomislav Nikolić and the Let's Get Serbia Moving coalition in the second round.

== Members ==
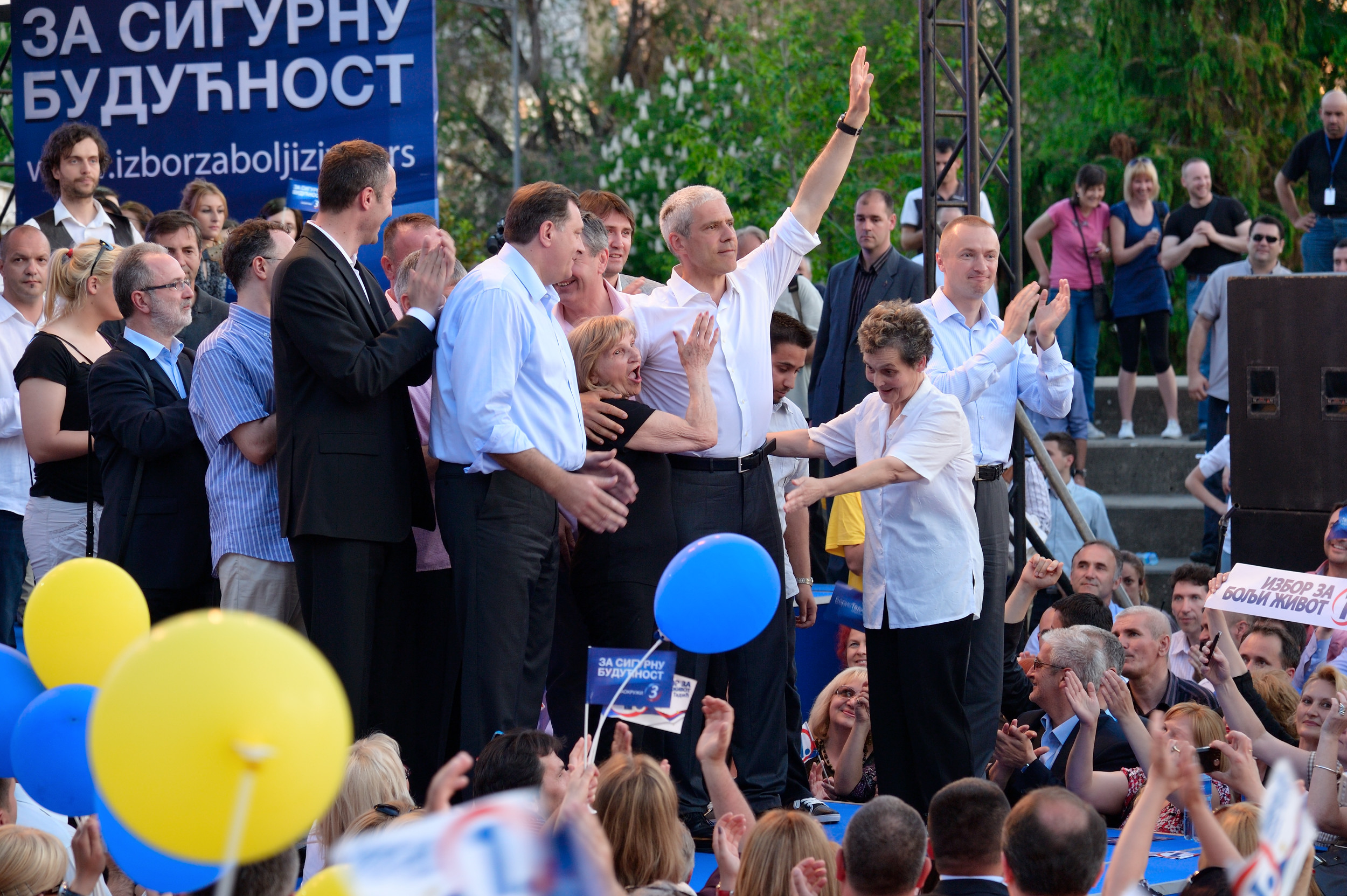
Coalition convention in Novi Sad with Boris Tadić, Bojan Pajtić, Igor Pavličić and Milorad Dodik

The coalition was composed of the following political parties:

Party	Ideology	Leader	2012 seats
Democratic Party (DS)	Social democracy	Boris Tadić	49
Social Democratic Party of Serbia (SDPS)	Social democracy	Rasim Ljajić	9
League of Social Democrats of Vojvodina (LSV)	Regionalism	Nenad Čanak	3
Greens of Serbia (ZS)	Green politics	Ivan Karić	1
Democratic Alliance of Croats in Vojvodina (DSHV)	Croat minority interests	Petar Kuntić	1
Christian Democratic Party of Serbia (DHSS)	Christian democracy	Olgica Batić	1

== See also ==
- For a European Serbia
- Let's Get Serbia Moving
