= Darko Bađok =

Serbian politician

Darko Bađok (Serbian Cyrillic: Дарко Бађок; born 1972) is a politician in Serbia. He has served in the Assembly of Vojvodina since 2013 as a member of the Serbian Progressive Party.

== Private career ==
Bađok was born in 1972 and holds a master's degree in engineering management. He lives in Zrenjanin.

In November 2012, an employee at a café owned by Bađok charged that he had physically attacked her during an argument over her salary. Bađok denied the accusation, contending that the employee in question had verbally and physically attacked him. In January 2014, a misdemeanour court in Zrenjanin found him guilty of having attacked the employee, causing minor physical injuries, and issued a fine of seven thousand dinars. Bađok announced that he would appeal the decision and said that he believed the accusation against him was politically motivated. In July 2014, he stated in an interview that the verdict had been overturned on appeal and a new trial ordered.

== Politician ==
Bađok was first elected to the Vojvodina provincial assembly in a by-election for Zrenjanin's third constituency seat in 2013. The Democratic Party and its allies formed the government of Vojvodina in this period, and Bađok served in opposition.

Vojvodina switched to a system of full proportional representation prior to the 2016 provincial election; Bađok received the thirty-fifth position on the Progressive Party's electoral list and was re-elected when the list won a majority victory with sixty-three out of 120 mandates. He was subsequently given the sixty-third position on the party's Aleksandar Vučić — For Our Children list in the 2020 provincial election and was elected to a third term when the list won an increased majority with seventy-six mandates. He is now a member of the assembly committee on education and science and the committee on urban and spatial planning and environmental protection.

== Electoral record ==
=== Provincial ===
2013 Assembly of Vojvodina by-election Zrenjanin III (constituency seat) - First and Second Rounds
Darko Bađok	Serbian Progressive Party	4,483	37.48	5,872	60.31
Miodrag Damjanov	Choice for a Better Vojvodina	2,603	21.76	3,864	39.69
Milan Piperski	Socialist Party of Serbia–Party of United Pensioners of Serbia–United Serbia–Social Democratic Party of Serbia	1,665	13.92		
Dragan Ćapin	Democratic Party of Serbia	1,014	8.48		
Vojislav Matić	League of Social Democrats of Vojvodina	914	7.64		
Zdravko Ždrale	Serbian Radical Party	373	3.12		
Radoš Pejović	Dveri	328	2.74		
Branislav Čordić	Citizens' Group: Branislav Čordić Brane – United for Banat	275	2.30		
Vitomir Eremić	Liberal Democratic Party	162	1.35		
Stevan Subotin	People's Peasant Party	144	1.20		
Total valid votes		11,961	100	9,736	100
