= Opinion polling for the 2014 Serbian parliamentary election =

In the run up to the 2014 parliamentary elections in Serbia, various organisations carried out opinion polling to gauge voting intention in Serbia. The results of these polls are displayed in this article.

The date range for these opinion polls range from the previous parliamentary election, held on 6 May 2012, to the 2014 election, held on 16 March 2014. Most opinion polls predicted that the SNS was going to fare close to 50%, while their partners in the ruling coalition SPS were stable at above 10%.

== Graphical summary ==
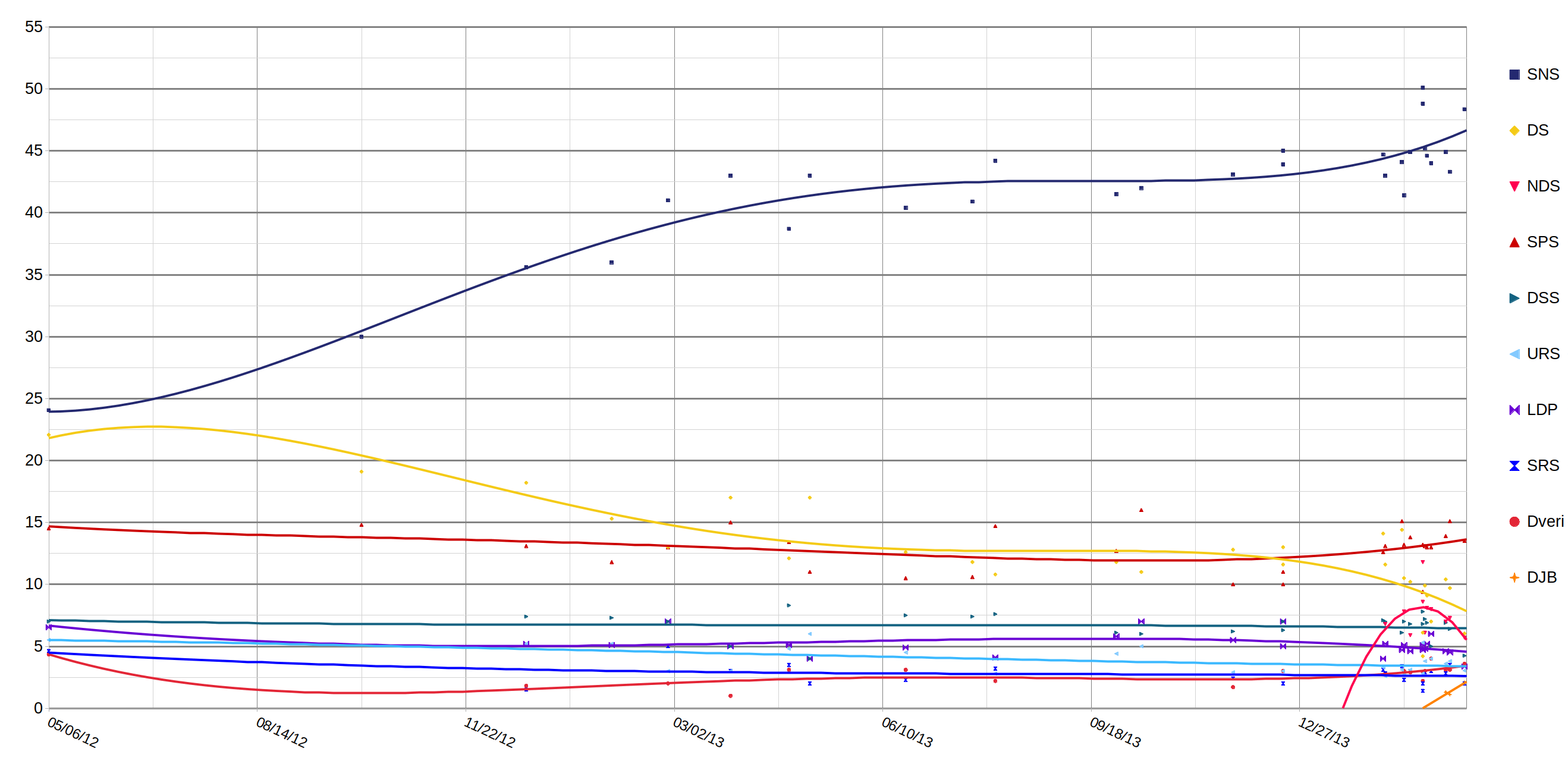

== Party vote ==
Poll results are listed in the tables below in reverse chronological order, showing the most recent first, and using the date the survey's fieldwork was done, as opposed to the date of publication. If such date is unknown, the date of publication is given instead. The highest percentage figure in each polling survey is displayed in bold, and the background shaded in the leading party's colour. In the instance that there is a tie, then no figure is shaded. The lead column on the right shows the percentage-point difference between the two parties with the highest figures. When a specific poll does not show a data figure for a party, the party's cell corresponding to that poll is shown empty.

Some long-standing coalitions implicitly included in several parties' ratings.

Polling Organization	Date	Sample size	SNS	DS	SPS	DSS	LDP	URS	SRS	Dveri	NDS	DJB	Others	Lead
**2014 election**	16 Mar 14	N/A	48.35	6.03	13.49	4.24	3.36	3.04	2.01	3.58	5.70	2.09	8.11	34.9
Ninamedia	6–9 Mar	1,203	43.3	9.7	15.1	6.4	4.5	3.8	3.5	3.1	7.3	1.1	2.2	28.2
Ninamedia	7 Mar	-	44.9	10.4	13.9	6.9	4.6	3.6	2.8	3.1	7	1.3	1.5	31
DJB candidacy approved
CeSid	22–28 Feb	1,188	44	7	13	5	6	4	3	4	8	-	6	31
Faktor Plus	26 Feb	-	44.6	9.1	13	6.9	5.2	-	-	-	8.1	-	13.1	31.6
Ninamedia	23–25 Feb	1,800	45.2	9.9	13.1	7.2	4.8	3.8	2.9	3	6.1	-	4	32.1
Informer	24 Feb	-	48.8	6.1	9.4	7.8	4.7	5.3	1.4	2.9	8.6	-	5	39.4
Ipsos Strategic Marketing	24 Feb	-	50.1	4.2	13.2	6.8	5.1	2.8	2	2.2	11.8	-	1.8	36.9
Ninamedia	16–18 Feb	1,800	44.9	10.2	13.8	6.8	4.6	3.1	3	2.9	5.9	-	4.8	31.1
Faktor Plus	15 Feb	-	41.4	10.5	13.2	7	5.1	2.7	2.3	3	7.8	-	7	28.2
Ninamedia	14 Feb	-	44.1	14.4	15.1	6.1	4.7	3.1	3.4	-	-	-	9.1	29
NDS announces participation
Faktor Plus	5–6 Feb	1,000	43	11.6	13.1	7	5.2	2.6	2.8	2.8	6.8 (Note: Hypothetical rating)	-	5.1	29.9
Ninamedia	5 Feb	-	44.7	14.1	12.6	7.1	4	3.3	3.1	-	-	-	11.1	30.6
2014
Faktor Plus	16–19 Dec	1,200	43.9	11.6	10	6.3	5	-	-	-	-	-	23.2 (Note: Including 3.5% for the SDPS (went in coalition with the DS in 2012 and the SNS in 2014).)	32.3
Ipsos Strategic Marketing	13–19 Dec	1,065	45	13	11	7	7	3	2	3	-	-	9 (Note: Including 2% for the SDPS (went in coalition with the DS in 2012 and the SNS in 2014), 1% each for the PUPS, JS (both went with the SPS in 2012 and 2014), LSV (went with the DS in 2012 and the NDS in 2014) and SPO (went with the LDP in 2012 and the SNS in 2014), and 0% for NS (went with the SNS in 2012 and 2014).)	32
Faktor Plus	20–25 Nov	1,100	43.1	12.8	10	6.2	5.5	2.9	2.4	1.7	-	-	15.4 (Note: Including 2.6% for the SDPS (went in coalition with the DS in 2012 and the SNS in 2014), and 2.7% for the PUPS (went with the SPS in 2012 and 2014).)	30.3
CeSid	12 Oct	1,500	42	11	16	6	7	5	-	-	-	-	13	26
Faktor plus	27–30 Sep	1,080	41.5	11.8	12.7	6.1	5.8	4.4	-	-	-	-	17.7	28.8
CeDem	1–3 Aug	-	44.2	10.8	14.7	7.6	4.1	2.8	3.2	2.2	-	-	10.4 (Note: Including 2.5% for the SPO (went with the LDP in 2012 and the SNS in 2014).)	29.5
Faktor plus	18–23 Jul	1,120	40.9	11.8	10.6	7.4	-	-	-	-	-	-	29.3	29.1
Faktor plus	17–21 Jun	1,150	40.4	12.6	10.5	7.5	4.9	4.5	2.3	3.1	-	-	29.3 (Note: Including 4% for the PUPS (went in coalition with the SPS in 2012 and 2014), and 2.9% for the SDPS (went with the DS in 2012 and the SNS in 2014).)	29.1
CeSid	6 May	1,196	43	17	11	4	4	6	2	-	-	-	13	26
Faktor Plus	26 Apr	1,180	38.7	12.1	13.4	8.3	5.1	4.8	3.5	3.1	-	-	11	25.3
Ipsos Strategic Marketing	29 Mar	-	43	17	15	5	5	3	3	1	-	-	8 (Note: Including 2% for JS (went in coalition with the SPS in 2012 and 2014), and 1% each for the PUPS (went with the SPS in 2012 and 2014), LSV (went with the DS in 2012 and the NDS in 2014), SPO (went with the LDP in 2012 and the SNS in 2014) and NS (went with the SNS in 2012 and 2014).)	26
Ipsos Strategic Marketing	27 Feb	1,060	41	13	13	7	7	3	5	2	-	-	9	28
Faktor plus	31 Jan	-	36	15.3	11.8	7.3	5.1	5.2	-	-	-	-	19.3	20.7
2013
Faktor plus	21 Dec	1,200	35.6	18.2	13.1	7.4	5.2	5.2	1.5	1.8	-	-	12	17.4
Faktor plus	3 Oct	1,200	30	19.1	14.8	-	-	-	-	-	-	-	36.1	10.9
**2012 election**	6 May 12	N/A	24.05	22.07	14.51	7.00	6.53	5.51	4.62	4.34	-	-	11.37	1.98
