= Vladimir Soro =

Serbian Politician

Vladimir Soro (Serbian Cyrillic: Владимир Соро; born 29 November 1967) is a politician in Serbia. He is currently serving his second term in the Assembly of Vojvodina as a member of the Movement of Socialists (Pokret socijalista, PS).

== Private career ==
Soro is an agricultural engineer.

== Politician ==
=== Early years ===
Soro entered political life as a member of the Socialist Party of Serbia. He appeared on the party's electoral list in the 2003 Serbian parliamentary election, receiving the 228th position out of 250 on a list that was mostly alphabetical. The list won twenty-two seats, and Soro did not receive a mandate. (From 2000 to 2011, Serbian parliamentary mandates were awarded to sponsoring parties or coalitions rather than individual candidates, and it was common practice for the mandates to be assigned out of numerical order. Soro's position on the list had no bearing on his chances of election.)

From 2004 to 2016, provincial elections in Vojvodina were held under a system of mixed proportional representation, with half of the mandates determined by elections in single-member constituency seats. Soro ran as the Socialist Party's candidate in Titel in the 2008 provincial election and finished in fourth place.

The Socialist Party experienced a split later in 2008, with Aleksandar Vulin forming the Movement of Socialists as a breakaway group. Soro sided with Vulin and joined the new party.

=== Assembly of Vojvodina ===
The PS joined the Serbian Progressive Party's electoral coalition prior to the 2012 provincial election. Soro again ran for the Titel constituency seat, this time under the banner of the Progressive-led Let's Get Vojvodina Moving alliance, and was elected in the second round of voting. The election was won by the Democratic Party and its allies, and Soro served in opposition for the next four years. He was not a candidate in the 2016 provincial election, which was the first to be held under a system of full proportional representation.

He was awarded the twenty-sixth position on the Progressive-led Aleksandar Vučić — For Our Children list in the 2020 provincial election and was elected to a second term when the list won a majority victory with seventy-six out of 120 mandates. He is now a member of the assembly committee on agriculture and the committee on petitions and motions.

=== Municipal politics ===
The PS ran its own electoral list in Titel for the 2012 Serbian local elections, and Soro appeared in the lead position. The list did not cross the electoral threshold to win any mandates. The PS subsequently formed an alliance with the Socialist Party for the 2016 local elections in Titel, and Soro was given the eighth position on their list. The list won five mandates, and he was not returned.

Notwithstanding its alliance with the Progressive Party at the provincial level, the PS once again fielded its own list for the 2020 local elections in Titel. Soro again appeared in the lead position and was this time elected when the list won two seats. He resigned his local mandate on 19 February 2021.

== Electoral record ==
=== Provincial (Vojvodina) ===
2012 Vojvodina assembly election Titel (constituency seat) - First and Second Rounds
Candidate	Party or Coalition	Votes	%	Votes	%
Vladimir Soro	Let's Get Vojvodina Moving–Tomislav Nikolić (Serbian Progressive Party, New Serbia, Movement of Socialists, Strength of Serbia Movement) (Affiliation: Movement of Socialists)	2,731	30.44	4,340	54.50
Dejan Kulja	United Regions of Serbia–Dejan Kulja	1,758	19.59	3,623	45.50
Milivoj Petrović Pele (incumbent)	Choice for a Better Vojvodina–Bojan Pajtić (Affiliation: Democratic Party)	1,658	18.48		
Milorad Jovančević Rajko	Serbian Radical Party	844	9.41		
Duško Kajtez	Democratic Party of Serbia	559	6.23		
Marko Simić	League of Social Democrats of Vojvodina–Nenad Čanak	533	5.94		
Dušan Tubić	Citizens' Group: Dveri: For the Life of Titel	466	5.19		
Stevan Curčić	Socialist Party of Serbia (SPS), Party of United Pensioners of Serbia (PUPS), United Serbia (JS), Social Democratic Party of Serbia (SDPS)	423	4.71		
Total valid votes		8,972	100	7,963	100

2008 Vojvodina assembly election Titel (constituency seat) - First and Second Rounds
Candidate	Party or Coalition	Votes	%	Votes	%
Milivoj Petrović	"For a European Vojvodina: Democratic Party–G17 Plus, Boris Tadić" (Affiliation: Democratic Party)	2,420	29.49	3,230	50.84
Ivana Zečević	Serbian Radical Party	3,165	38.56	3,123	49.16
Duško Kajtez	Democratic Party of Serbia	1,064	12.96		
Vladimir Soro	Socialist Party of Serbia (SPS)–Party of United Pensioners of Serbia (PUPS) (Affiliation: Socialist Party of Serbia)	1,041	12.68		
Aleksandar Milinkov	Together for Vojvodina–Nenad Čanak	517	6.30		
Total valid votes		8,207	100	6,353	100
Invalid ballots		448		149	
Total votes casts		8,655	68.44	6,502	51.42
