= Jovan Lazarov =

Serbian politician (born 1977)

Jovan Lazarov (Serbian Cyrillic: Јован Лазаров; born 1977) is a politician in Serbia. He served in the Assembly of Vojvodina from 2012 to 2020 and is now a member of the Pančevo city assembly. Lazarov is a member of the Serbian Progressive Party (Srpska napredna stranka, SNS).

== Private career ==
Lazarov is a graduated economist. He lives in Pančevo.

== Politician ==
Lazarov was first elected to the Vojvodina assembly in the 2012 provincial election, winning Pančevo's third constituency seat in the second round. The election was won by the Democratic Party (Demokratska stranka, DS) and its allies, and Lazarov served for the next four years in opposition. He was the deputy chair of the budget and finance committee and a member of the informal green parliamentary group.

Vojvodina switched to a system of full proportional representation prior to the 2016 provincial election. Lazarov was given the fifty-first position on the Progressive Party's electoral list and was re-elected when the list won a majority victory with sixty-three out of 120 seats. During his second term, he served as president of the committee for budget and finance. He also served for a short time as a member of the management board for Pančevo's pre-school institution Dečja radost. His membership on this committee was controversial; the city's educational inspection unit determined he was in a conflict-of-interest situation as his child attended the institution. He did not seek re-election at the provincial level in 2020.

He was given the seventeenth position on the Progressive Party's list in Pančevo for the 2020 Serbian local elections and was elected when the list won a majority victory with forty-seven out of seventy mandates.

== Electoral record ==
=== Provincial (Vojvodina) ===
2012 Vojvodina assembly election Pančevo III (constituency seat) - First and Second Rounds
| Jovan Lazarov | Let's Get Vojvodina Moving (Affiliation: Serbian Progressive Party) | 3,834 | 20.70 | 7,742 | 51.83 |
| Predrag Škaljak | Democratic Party of Serbia | 2,789 | 15.06 | 7,194 | 48.17 |
| Branko Bokun | Saša Pavlov–United for Pančevo–United Regions of Serbia | 2,783 | 15.03 | | |
| Siniša Kojić (incumbent) | Choice for a Better Vojvodina | 2,341 | 12.64 | | |
| Sebastian Flora | Socialist Party of Serbia–Party of United Pensioners of Serbia–United Serbia–Social Democratic Party of Serbia | 2,129 | 11.50 | | |
| Oliver Petković | League of Social Democrats of Vojvodina | 1,688 | 9.11 | | |
| Zoran Vujasinović | Serbian Radical Party | 1,482 | 8.00 | | |
| Siniša Mitreski | Preokret | 1,076 | 5.81 | | |
| Petar Pančevac | Citizens' Group: Association of Citizens Arch | 399 | 2.15 | | |
| Total valid votes | | 18,521 | 100 | 14,936 | 100 |
