= Opinion polling for the 2016 Serbian parliamentary election =

In the run up to the 2016 parliamentary elections in the Serbia, various organisations carried out opinion polling to gauge voting intention in Serbia. Results of such polls are displayed in this article.

The date range for these opinion polls range from the previous parliamentary election, held on 16 March 2014, to the 2016 election, held on 24 April 2016. Most opinion polls predicted that the SNS was going to fare around 50%, while their partners in the ruling coalition SPS were stable at above 10%. Serbian Radical Party, strengthened by the return of their leader Vojislav Šešelj from the Hague Tribunal, seemed the only party certain to make it to the Parliament with the support of 6–8% polled, while all other major lists undulated around the 5% threshold.

== Party vote ==
Poll results are listed in the tables below in reverse chronological order, showing the most recent first, and using the date the survey's fieldwork was done, as opposed to the date of publication. If such date is unknown, the date of publication is given instead. The highest percentage figure in each polling survey is displayed in bold, and the background shaded in the leading party's colour. In the instance that there is a tie, then no figure is shaded. The lead column on the right shows the percentage-point difference between the two parties with the highest figures. When a specific poll does not show a data figure for a party, the party's cell corresponding to that poll is shown empty.

| Date | Polling Firm | SNS et al. | SPS JS | DS | SRS | Dveri | DSS | SDS | LDP | DJB | Others | Lead |
| 24 Apr 2016 | 2016 Election result | 48.4 | 10.9 | 6.0 | 8.1 | 5.0 | | 5.0 (+LSV) | | 6.0 | 10.6 | 37.5 |
|---|---|---|---|---|---|---|---|---|---|---|---|---|
| 21 Apr | CeSid | 54.0 | 11.0 | 5.0 | 7.0 | 5.0 | | 6.0 (+LSV) | | 6.0 | 6 | 43.0 |
| 20 Apr | Faktor Plus | 50.9 | 12.3 | 5.5 | 7.9 | 5.2 | | 5.1 (+LSV) | | 4.6 | 8.5 | 38.6 |
| 6–13 Apr | Ninamedia | 47.2 | 13.3 | 5.1 | 9.3 | 6.3 | | 5.6 (+LSV) | | 4.9 | 8.3 | 33.9 |
| 7–14 Apr | NSPM | 44.8 | 12.7 | 7.5 | 9.8 | 6.3 | | 6.9 (+LSV) | | 4.2 | 7.8 | 32.1 |
| 19 Apr | ProPozitiv | 50.6 | 11.4 | 4.9 | 8.2 | 5.6 | | 6.9 (+LSV) | | 5.3 | 7.1 | 39.2 |
| mid–Apr | FPN | 27.2 | 11.6 | 5.6 | 17.5 | 8.1 | | 12.0 (+LSV) | | 8.8 | 9.2 | 9.7 |
| 3–10 Apr | Faktor Plus | 50.9 | 12.3 | 5.7 | 7.8 | 5.1 | | 5.0 (+LSV) | | 4.5 | 8.7 | 38.3 |
| 31 Mar | ProPozitiv | 52.4 | 12.3 | 4.6 | 6.5 | 7.4 | | 7.3 (+LSV) | | 5.7 | 3.8 | 40.1 |
| 28–31 Mar | CeSID | 53.0 | 13.0 | 5.0 | 7.0 | 8.0 | | 6.0 (+LSV) | | 5.0 | 3 | 40 |
| 27 Mar | Faktor Plus | 52.6 | 11.9 | 6.1 | 6.1 | 5.5 | | 5.0 (+LSV) | | 3.3 | 9.5 | 40.7 |
| 3 Mar | Faktor Plus | 49.4 | 12.7 | 6.4 | 6.0 | 5.7 | | 5.0 (+LSV) | | 3 | 11.8 | 36.7 |
| 28 Jan–7 Feb | NSPM | 44.9 | 11.8 | 10.8 | 7.0 | 6.8 | | 8.5 (+LSV) | | 3.4 | 6.8 | 33.1 |
| 3 Feb | Faktor Plus | 49.5 | 12.0 | 6.8 | 6.0 | 5.6 | | 5.2 (+LSV) | | 2.3 | 12.6 | 37.5 |
2016
| 20–27 Dec | Ninamedia Research | 47.7 | 11.1 | 6.0 | 5.9 | 4.0 | 2.4 | 4.8 | | – | 18.1 | 36.6 |
| 15–25 Dec | Faktor Plus | 51.4 | 9.5 | 6.5 | 6.0 | 5.2 | | 4.1 | | 2.2 | 15.1 | 41.9 |
| c. 24 Dec | Ipsos Strategic Marketing | 52.0 | 11.0 | 5.9 | 6.2 | 5.0 | – | 6.9 | | – | 13 | 41.0 |
| mid–Dec | Ipsos Strategic Marketing | 52 | 10 | 5 | 3 | 5 | 2 | 4 | 2 | 2 | 15 | 42 |
| 25 Nov–3 Dec | NSPM | 42.1 | 10.7 | 11.1 | 5.3 | 4.9 | 3.5 | 3.0 | 2.8 | 2.8 | 13.8 | 31.0 |
| 24–30 Nov | Faktor Plus | 51.6 | 8.7 | 6.5 | 6.2 | 3.1 | 2.8 | 2.9 | 1.3 | 2.0 | 14.9 | 42.9 |
| 24–27 Nov | Ipsos Strategic Marketing | 52 | 10 | 5 | 5 | 4 | 3 | 7 | | – | 14 | 42 |
| 26–30 Oct | Faktor Plus | 51.5 | 8.7 | 6.0 | 6.6 | 3.3 | 2.9 | 2.8 | 1.2 | 2.0 | 15 | 42.8 |
| 10–18 Oct | NSPM | 45.8 | 10.4 | 9.4 | 5.8 | 4.5 | 3.9 | 3.2 | 2.5 | 1.6 | 12.9 | 35.4 |
| c. 12 Oct | Ipsos Strategic Marketing | 50 | 10 | 5–6 | 5–6 | – | – | – | – | – | 28–30 | 40 |
| 1–7 Oct | Ninamedia Research | 48.1 | 14.3 (+PUPS) | 5.8 | 6.2 | 3.2 | 3.0 | 3.3 | 2.6 | 2.2 | 11.3 | 33.8 |
| 25 Sep–4 Oct | Ipsos Strategic Marketing | 54 | 9 | 5 | 6 | 3 | 4 | 2 | 3 | 2 | 12 | 45 |
| 25–30 Sep | Faktor Plus | 51.5 | 8.8 | 7.0 | 6.0 | 3.1 | 3.0 | 3.0 | 1.2 | 1.5 | 14.9 | 42.7 |
| 5–14 Sep | NSPM | 39.1 | 11.6 | 11.1 | 5.9 | 4.6 | 4.3 | 2.8 | 3.3 | 2.3 | 15 | 27.5 |
| late Aug–early Sep | Ipsos Strategic Marketing | 48 | 10 | 6 | 4 | 3 | 3 | 4 | 5 | 3 | 14 | 38 |
| 26–30 Aug | Faktor Plus | 51.0 | 9.0 | 7.0 | 5.8 | 2.9 | 2.8 | 3.1 | 1.2 | 1.0 | 16.2 | 42.0 |
| 24–30 Jul | Faktor Plus | 50.7 | 9.2 | 7.1 | 5.8 | 2.8 | 2.5 | 3.0 | 1.2 | 1.0 | 16.7 | 41.5 |
| 18–26 Jun | NSPM | 45.0 | 10.7 | 10.9 | 3.5 | 4.5 | 4.0 | 3.4 | – | 0.8 | 17.2 | 34.1 |
| 18–25 Jun | Faktor Plus | 50.5 | 9.3 | 7.0 | 6.4 | 2.9 | 2.2 | 3.2 | 1.2 | 1.0 | 16.3 | 41.2 |
| 21–27 May | Faktor Plus | 50.6 | 9.5 | 7.0 | 6.1 | 3.0 | 2.0 | 3.1 | 1.3 | 1.2 | 16.2 | 41.1 |
| late May | Ipsos Strategic Marketing | 50.0 | 12.0 (+PUPS) | 6.1 | 6.8 | 6.6 | | 4.9 | 2.5 | 1.4 | 9.7 | 38.0 |
| 25–29 Apr | Faktor Plus | 52.1 | 9.5 | 8.3 | 6.4 | – | – | 4.1 | – | – | 19.6 | 42.6 |
| 17–24 Apr | Faktor Plus | 50.8 | 10.1 | 7.2 | 6.0 | 3.5 | 1.9 | 3.3 | 1.3 | 1.4 | 14.5 | 40.7 |
| 10–22 Apr | NSPM | 42.4 | 10.7 | 12.5 | 6.1 | 4.2 | 4.8 | 2.4 | 2.4 | 0.8 | 13.7 | 29.9 |
| 30 Mar–3 Apr | Faktor Plus | 50.6 | 10.8 | 7.1 | 4.8 | 3.7 | 2.0 | 3.4 | 1.5 | 1.6 | 14.5 | 39.8 |
| early Mar | Faktor Plus | 50.1 | 10.2 | 7.1 | 4.6 | 3.9 | 1.8 | 3.2 | 1.7 | 1.6 | 15.8 | 39.9 |
| 24–30 Jan | TNS Medium Gallup | 48.7 | 6.4 | 3.2 | 3.4 | 2.2 | 0.8 | 3.6 | 1.6 | – | 30.1 | 42.3 |
| 27 Dec–5 Jan | NSPM | 47.9 | 12.0 | 10.8 | 3.3 | 3.4 | 4.4 | 3.9 | 2.7 | 0.7 | 10.9 | 35.9 |
2015
| 16–19 Dec | Faktor Plus | 51.1 | 10.8 | 6.6 | 4.6 | 3.9 | 1.1 | 4.5 | 1.0 | – | 16.4 | 40.3 |
| late Nov | Faktor Plus | 51.0 | 10.5 | 6.5 | 4.6 | 3.8 | – | 4.5 | – | – | 19.1 | 40.5 |
| late Nov | Ipsos Strategic Marketing | 50 | 10 | 6 | 3 | 5 | 3 | 3 | 3 | 3 | 14 | 40 |
| 10–15 Oct | NSPM | 46.7 | 13.3 | 6.5 | 3.7 | 3.1 | 3.4 | 5.9 | 3.7 | – | 13.7 | 33.4 |
| 8–10 Oct | Faktor Plus | 50.5 | 10.8 | 6.1 | 3.0 | 2.6 | – | 4.8 | – | – | 22.2 | 39.7 |
| 24 Sep–1 Oct | Ninamedia Research | 49.6 | 10.9 | 5.9 | 3.4 | 5.1 | 4.1 | 4.5 | 3.1 | 2.2 | 11.2 | 38.7 |
| 1–6 Sep | Faktor Plus | 50.5 | 11.0 | 5.9 | 3.1 | 2.0 | – | 4.8 | – | – | 22.7 | 39.5 |
| 9–13 Aug | Faktor Plus | 50.6 | 11.0 | 5.2 | 3.9 | – | – | 4.8 | – | – | 24.5 | 39.6 |
| 26 Jun–2 Jul | Faktor Plus | 50.5 | 10.5 | 6.1 | 4.3 | – | – | 5.6 | – | – | 23 | 40.0 |
| 27–29 May | Faktor Plus | 50.1 | 12.8 | 6.2 | – | – | – | 5.8 | – | – | 25.1 | 37.3 |
| 22–29 May | Danas | 55 | 13 (+PUPS) | 5 | 3 | 4 | 4 | 5 | 5 | 2 | 4 | 42 |
| mid–Apr | Faktor Plus | 51.1 | 12.5 | 6.3 | – | – | 3.9 | 5.9 | – | – | 20.3 | 38.6 |
| 16 Mar 2014 | 2014 Election result | 48.4 | 13.5 (+PUPS) | 6.0 | 2.0 | 3.6 | 4.2 | 5.7 | 3.4 | 2.1 | 11.1 | 34.9 |

== Notes ==
1. Based on 890 respondents aged 18 years (first-time voters).
2. If the parties were to run in coalition: (mid–Dec 2015)
  - SNS–PUPS–SDPS–PS 51
  - SPS–JS 12
  - SDS–LDP 8
  - Dveri–DSS 6
  - LSV–LS–DJB 6
  - DS–NOVA 5
  - SRS 4
3. Dveri–DSS coalition 7.8. (1–7 Oct 2015)
4. If the parties were to run in coalition: (24 Sep–4 Oct 2015)
  - SNS–PUPS–SDPS–NS–SPO–SNP–PS 51
  - SPS–JS 14
  - Dveri–DSS 8
  - DS–NOVA–DJB 7
  - SDS–LDP 7
  - SRS 7
5. Ipsos Strategic Marketing poll for International Republican Institute (IRI).
6. Between 13–15 if in coalition with JS and PUPS. (26–30 Aug 2015)
7. If in coalition: (24–30 Jul 2015)
  - SPS–JS–PUPS about 13.
  - Dveri–DSS slightly more than 5.
8. Based on 800 respondents aged 18–25 years.
9. Percentages would be higher if undecided voters were excluded.
  - SPS–JS–PUPS coalition 8.5. (24–30 Jan 2015)
