= Dušan Tubić =

Serbian politician

Dušan Tubić (Serbian Cyrillic: Душан Тубић; born 1957) is a politician in Serbia. He served in the National Assembly of Serbia from 2001 to 2004 as a member of the Democratic Party of Serbia (Demokratska stranka Srbije, DSS). Tubić is now a member of the Movement for the Restoration of the Kingdom of Serbia (Pokret obnove Kraljevine Srbije, POKS).

== Private career ==
Tubić is a graduated veterinarian and lives in Titel, Vojvodina.

== Politician ==
=== Parliamentarian ===
Tubić was elected to the national assembly in the 2000 Serbian parliamentary election, which the Democratic Party of Serbia contested as part of the Democratic Opposition of Serbia (Demokratska opozicija Srbije, DOS), a broad and ideologically diverse coalition of parties opposed to former president Slobodan Milošević. Tubić received the 121st position on the DOS's electoral list and was awarded a mandate when the list won a landslide victory with 176 out of 250 seats. (From 2000 to 2011, parliamentary mandates were awarded to sponsoring parties or coalitions rather than to individual candidates, and the mandates were often awarded out of numerical order. Tubić did not automatically receive a mandate by virtue of his list position, but he was selected as a DSS representative all the same.) He took his seat when the assembly met in early 2001. Following the election, the DOS formed a new administration under the leadership of Democratic Party (Demokratska stranka, DS) leader Zoran Đinđić. The DSS left the DOS in 2002 and moved into opposition.

The DSS fielded its own electoral list in the 2003 Serbian parliamentary election, and Tubić received the 160th position. The list won fifty-three seats, and he was not selected for a new mandate. His term in the assembly ended in early 2004.

=== Later career ===
Tubić subsequently left the DSS. He ran for the Assembly of Vojvodina in the 2012 provincial election as a Dveri candidate, placing seventh in a field of eight candidates for the Titel constituency seat.

He is now the president of the POKS municipal board in Titel. He appeared in the forty-third position on the movement's For the Kingdom of Serbia – For Serbian Vojvodina list in the 2020 provincial election. The list won five mandates, and he was not returned. (Since an electoral reform in 2011, mandates in all Serbian elections decided by proportional representation have been assigned in numerical order.) He also appeared in the lead position on the POKS list for the Titel municipal assembly in the concurrent 2020 Serbian local elections. The list did not win any mandates.

== Electoral record ==
=== Provincial (Vojvodina) ===
2012 Vojvodina assembly election Titel (constituency seat) - First and Second Rounds
Vladimir Soro	Let's Get Vojvodina Moving–Tomislav Nikolić (Serbian Progressive Party, New Serbia, Movement of Socialists, Strength of Serbia Movement) (Affiliation: Movement of Socialists)	2,731	30.44	4,340	54.50
Dejan Kulja	United Regions of Serbia–Dejan Kulja	1,758	19.59	3,623	45.50
Milivoj Petrović Pele (incumbent)	Choice for a Better Vojvodina–Bojan Pajtić (Affiliation: Democratic Party)	1,658	18.48		
Milorad Jovančević Rajko	Serbian Radical Party	844	9.41		
Duško Kajtez	Democratic Party of Serbia	559	6.23		
Marko Simić	League of Social Democrats of Vojvodina–Nenad Čanak	533	5.94		
Dušan Tubić	Citizens' Group: Dveri: For the Life of Titel	466	5.19		
Stevan Curčić	Socialist Party of Serbia (SPS), Party of United Pensioners of Serbia (PUPS), United Serbia (JS), Social Democratic Party of Serbia (SDPS)	423	4.71		
Total valid votes		8,972	100	7,963	100
