= Života Starčević =

Serbian politician

- Живота Старчевић
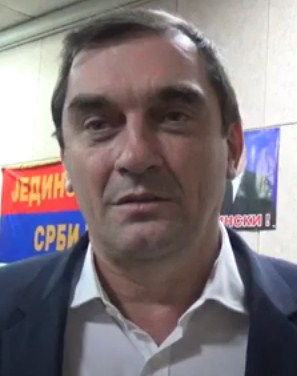

Leader of United Serbia
- Acting
- Assumed office 22 November 2024
- Preceded by: Dragan Marković

Member of the National Assembly of the Republic of Serbia
- Incumbent
- Assumed office 3 August 2020

Personal details
- Born: 1968 (age 57–58)
- Party: DSS (until 2014); JS (2014–present)

Života Starčević (Serbian Cyrillic: Живота Старчевић; born 1968) is a Serbian politician. He has served in the Serbian parliament since 2020 as a member of United Serbia (JS).

Following the death of party leader Dragan Marković Palma on 22 November 2024, Starčević became the acting leader of United Serbia.

== Early life and private career ==
Starčević has a bachelor's degree in geography. He worked as a teacher in Jagodina until 2006, when he was appointed as head of academic administration for the Pomoravlje District.

== Politician ==
=== Democratic Party of Serbia ===
Starčević entered politics as a member of the Democratic Party of Serbia (DSS). He appeared in the 202nd position (out of 250) on a combined electoral list of the DSS and New Serbia (NS) in the 2008 Serbian parliamentary election. The list won thirty seats, and he was not included in his party's assembly delegation. (From 2000 to 2011, Serbian parliamentary mandates were awarded to sponsoring parties or coalitions rather than to individual candidates, and it was common practice for the mandates to be assigned out of numerical order. Starčević could have been given a seat in the assembly despite his low position on the list, but this did not occur.)

He also appeared on the DSS's list for Jagodina in the 2008 Serbian local elections, which took place concurrently with the parliamentary vote, and was elected to the city assembly when the list won two seats. Jagodina is United Serbia's main area of support, and a local JS-led coalition won a majority victory.

Serbia's electoral system was reformed in 2011, such that all parliamentary mandates were awarded to candidates on successful lists in numerical order. Starčević received the sixty-first position on the DSS list in the 2012 parliamentary election and was not elected when the list won twenty-one seats. He was re-elected to the Jagodina city assembly in the concurrent 2012 local elections, apparently after receiving the lead position on the DSS list; the JS's coalition again won a majority victory. Starčević was a vice-president of the DSS's executive board at the republic level in this period.

He was promoted to the thirty-fifth position on the DSS's list in the 2014 parliamentary election, in which the party fell below the electoral threshold for assembly representation. He resigned from the DSS to join United Serbia in October 2014, citing Vojislav Koštunica's departure as DSS leader and the party's poor strategy in recent elections.

=== United Serbia ===
United Serbia has contested all Serbian parliamentary elections since 2008 as part of a coalition led by the Socialist Party of Serbia (SPS). Starčević was given the ninety-first position on the SPS's list in the 2016 parliamentary election and was not elected when the list won twenty-nine seats. He also appeared in the eighth position on a JS–SPS list in Jagodina for the concurrent 2016 local elections and was elected to a third city term when the list won twenty-one out of thirty-one seats.

==== Parliamentarian ====
Starčević was promoted to the seventh position on the SPS list in the 2020 parliamentary election and was elected when the list won thirty-two seats. He served afterward as deputy leader of the JS parliamentary group, which provided outside support to Serbia's administration led by the Serbian Progressive Party (SNS). He was also a member of the education committee (Note: Formally known as the Committee on Education, Science, Technological Development, and the Information Society.) and the subcommittee on the information society and digitalisation, a deputy member of the administrative committee, (Note: Formally known as the committee on Administrative, Budgetary, Mandate, and Immunity Issues.) the head of Serbia's parliamentary friendship groups with Eritrea and the Netherlands, and a member of the friendship groups with Austria, Egypt, Greece, Italy, North Korea, Russia, Turkey, the United Kingdom, and the United States of America.

He again received the seventh position on the SPS list in the 2022 parliamentary election and was re-elected when the list won thirty-one seats. He remained as deputy leader of the JS group and was deputy president of the administrative committee, a member of the economy committee, (Note: Formally known as the committee on the Economy, Regional Development, Trade, Tourism, and Energy.) a deputy member of the education committee, a member of the European Union–Serbia stabilization and association committee, and a member of twenty-eight parliamentary friendship groups. (Note: He was a member of the friendship groups with Austria, Belarus, Brazil, Bulgaria, China, Cuba, Cyprus, the Czech Republic, the Dominican Republic, Egypt, France, Germany, Greece, Hungary, India, Italy, Nepal, North Macedonia, Palestine, Qatar, Romania, Russia, Slovenia, Spain, Sweden, Turkey, the United Arab Emirates, and the United States of America.)

In June 2023, Starčević demanded that Rade Basta be dismissed from the Serbian government after Basta, a JS member, called for Russia to be sanctioned for its invasion of Ukraine in defiance of the party's views. Basta was removed from office shortly thereafter.

Starčević appeared in the seventh position on the SPS list for the third consecutive time in the 2023 parliamentary election and was elected to a third term when the list won eighteen seats. He is once again the deputy leader of the JS group and is a member of the education committee, the economy committee, and the European integration committee; a deputy member of the defence and internal affairs committee and the stabilization and association committee; and a member of twenty-one parliamentary friendship groups. (Note: He is a member of the friendship groups with Austria, Bulgaria, the Caribbean Countries (Antigua and Barbuda, the Bahamas, Barbados, Belize, Dominica, the Dominican Republic, Grenada, Haiti, Panama, Saint Kitts and Nevis, Saint Lucia, Saint Vincent and the Grenadines, and Trinidad and Tobago), China, Cuba, Cyprus, the Czech Republic, Egypt, France, Germany, Greece, Hungary, India, Italy and the Holy See, North Korea, Romania, Russia, Spain, Sweden, the United Arab Emirates, and the United States of America.)

In September 2024, he denied media reports that United Serbia was ending its alliance with the Socialist Party and that he himself had sent a text message to SPS leader Ivica Dačić to this effect on behalf of JS leader Dragan Marković.

==== Local politics since 2020 ====
Starčević again appeared in the eighth position on the JS-led list for Jagodina in the 2020 local elections and was re-elected when the list won seventeen out of twenty-one seats. He was promoted to the fourth position in the 2024 local elections and was elected to a fifth term in the city assembly when the list won thirteen seats.
