= Ivica Dačić – Factor of Stability! =

Electoral alliance in Serbia

Ivica Dačić – Factor of Stability! Ивица Дачић – Фактор стабилности! Ivica Dačić – Faktor stabilnosti!
- Leader: Ivica Dačić
- Founded: 2008
- Ideology: Populism
- Colours: Red
- National Assembly: 0 / 250
- City Assembly of Belgrade: 5 / 110

Ivica Dačić – Factor of Stability! (Serbian: Ивица Дачић – Фактор стабилности!, Ivica Dačić – Faktor stabilnosti!) is an electoral alliance in Serbia led by the Socialist Party of Serbia (SPS) and its president, Ivica Dačić. Its other members are United Serbia (JS), the Social Democratic Party of Serbia (SDPS), and the Greens of Serbia (ZS).

The alliance traces its origins to the coalition that SPS formed with the Party of United Pensioners of Serbia (PUPS) and JS for the 2008 parliamentary election. It has contested every parliamentary election since then under Dačić's name, and has been part of every government since 2008: first with the Democratic Party (DS) and, from 2012, with the Serbian Progressive Party (SNS). PUPS left the alliance in 2016. The alliance ran as Ivica Dačić – Prime Minister of Serbia (Serbian: Ивица Дачић – Премијер Србије, Ivica Dačić – Premijer Srbije) in 2022 and 2023, and adopted its current name for the 2026 election, when SDPS joined.

== History ==
=== SPS–PUPS–JS (2008–2016) ===
For the 2008 parliamentary election, SPS formed a coalition with PUPS and JS, which won 20 seats. The coalition then joined the government led by DS's For a European Serbia alliance, formed in July 2008, in which Dačić became first deputy prime minister and minister of internal affairs; in December 2008, SPS and DS signed a declaration on political reconciliation.

The coalition ran again as "Ivica Dačić – SPS, PUPS, JS" in the 2012 election, winning 44 seats. It then formed a government with SNS and the United Regions of Serbia, with Dačić as prime minister and minister of internal affairs. After the 2014 snap election, in which it again won 44 seats, it remained in government with the SNS-led coalition, and Dačić became first deputy prime minister and minister of foreign affairs.

=== SPS–JS (2016–2022) ===
In February 2016, PUPS left the coalition and sought an agreement with SNS instead, while SPS and JS formed a coalition with the Greens of Serbia. SPS and JS contested the 2016 election as "Ivica Dačić – Socialist Party of Serbia (SPS), United Serbia (JS) – Dragan Marković Palma", and ran under the same name in the 2020 election. Joška Broz, the leader of the Communist Party, was elected to the National Assembly on the SPS list, though according to Broz there was no formal coalition agreement between the two parties; in January 2022, the Communist Party renamed itself the Serbian Left.

=== Ivica Dačić – Prime Minister of Serbia (2022–2026) ===
Logo used in 2022 and 2023

The alliance adopted the name "Ivica Dačić – Prime Minister of Serbia" for the 2022 general election; its list, which again included the Greens of Serbia, was proclaimed by the Republic Electoral Commission (RIK) on 17 February 2022. During the campaign, the alliance opposed NATO membership and sanctions against Russia, and supported closer cooperation with China and Russia. Toma Fila, its ballot carrier for the Belgrade City Assembly election, campaigned on pensioners' interests. The alliance was also endorsed by organisations such as Biogen, the Environmental Movement of Beočin, and the Democratic Union of Roma.

The alliance ran under the same name in the 2023 snap election. Marko Milošević, the grandson of Slobodan Milošević, was third on its list. The alliance won 18 seats, its worst result since 2008, and SPS remained in government. JS leader Dragan Marković died in November 2024 and was later succeeded by his son Dalibor Marković.

=== Factor of Stability (2026–present) ===
In 2026, SPS signed a memorandum of cooperation with SDPS, led by Jug Radivojević since Rasim Ljajić stepped down; analysts described the cooperation as a way for both parties to cross the electoral threshold and as a step away from SNS. On 8 September 2026, the SPS main board unanimously decided to contest the snap parliamentary election in a coalition with JS, SDPS, and ZS. The alliance submitted its list, "Ivica Dačić – Factor of Stability!", with 21,266 signatures on 12 September; Dačić said that the name reflected the coalition's long-standing focus on "political stability as the condition of all conditions for the survival of Serbia". RIK proclaimed the list on 14 September, and it was given the second position on the ballot.

== Members ==
=== Current members ===
Name	Leader	Main ideology	Political position	Joined
Socialist Party of Serbia (SPS)	Ivica Dačić	Populism	Centre-left (Note: Some analysts argue that SPS is left-leaning only nominally; in 2026, political analyst Zoran Lutovac described it as "a populist party completely fused with the Serbian Progressive Party".)	2008
United Serbia (JS)	Dalibor Marković	National conservatism	Right-wing	2008
Greens of Serbia (ZS)	Ivan Karić	Green politics	Centre-left	2016
Social Democratic Party of Serbia (SDPS)	Jug Radivojević	Social democracy	Centre-left	2026

=== Former members ===
Name	Leader	Main ideology	Membership
Party of United Pensioners of Serbia (PUPS)	Jovan Krkobabić	Pensioners' interests	2008–2016
Communist Party (KP)	Joška Broz	Titoism, Yugonostalgia	2016–2022

== Electoral performance ==
=== Parliamentary elections ===
National Assembly
Year	Leader	List name	Popular vote	% of popular vote	#	# of seats	Seat change	Status	Ref.
2008	Ivica Dačić	SPS–PUPS–JS	313,896	7.75%	4th	20 / 250	New	Government	
2012	Ivica Dačić	Ivica Dačić – SPS, PUPS, JS	567,689	15.18%	▲3rd	44 / 250	▲24	Government	
2014	Ivica Dačić	Ivica Dačić – SPS, PUPS, JS	484,607	13.94%	▲2nd	44 / 250	0	Government	
2016	Ivica Dačić	Ivica Dačić – SPS, JS – Dragan Marković Palma	413,770	11.28%	2nd	29 / 250	▼15	Government	
2020	Ivica Dačić	Ivica Dačić – SPS, JS – Dragan Marković Palma	334,333	10.78%	2nd	32 / 250	▲3	Government	
2022	Ivica Dačić	Ivica Dačić – Prime Minister of Serbia	435,274	11.79%	▼3rd	31 / 250	▼1	Government	
2023	Ivica Dačić	Ivica Dačić – Prime Minister of Serbia	249,916	6.73%	3rd	18 / 250	▼13	Government	
2026	Ivica Dačić	Ivica Dačić – Factor of Stability!	94,766	2.16%	3rd	0 / 250	▼18	Extra-parliamentary	

=== Presidential elections ===
President of Serbia
Year	Candidate		1st round popular vote		% of popular vote	2nd round popular vote		% of popular vote	Notes	Ref.
Year	Name	Party	1st round popular vote		% of popular vote	2nd round popular vote		% of popular vote	Notes	Ref.
2022	Aleksandar Vučić	SNS	1st	2,224,914	60.01%	—N/a	—	—	Supported Vučić	

=== Belgrade City Assembly elections ===
City Assembly of Belgrade
Year	Leader	Popular vote	% of popular vote	#	# of seats	Seat change	Status	Ref.
2022	Toma Fila	64,050	7.14%	4th	8 / 110	0	Government	
2023	Toma Fila	44,671	4.86%	▼5th	5 / 110	▼3	Snap election	
