= Milivoj Petrović =

Serbian politician

Milivoj Petrović (Serbian Cyrillic: Миливој Петровић; born 1969) is a politician in Serbia. He was the mayor of Titel from 2001 to 2012 and was a member of the Assembly of Vojvodina from 2008 to 2012. He was also briefly recognized as a member of the National Assembly of Serbia in 2002. During his time as an elected official, Petrović was a member of the Democratic Party (Demokratska stranka, DS).

== Private career ==
Petrović is an agricultural technician in private life.

== Politician ==
=== Parliamentarian and first term as mayor (2001–04) ===
In 2000, the Democratic Party became part of the Democratic Opposition of Serbia (DOS), a broad and ideologically diverse coalition of parties opposed to the authoritarian rule of Slobodan Milošević and his allies. The DOS defeated Milošević in the 2000 Yugoslavian general election, a watershed moment in Yugoslavian and Serbian politics. The DOS also won majority victories in several municipalities in the concurrent 2000 Serbian local elections; in Titel, Milošević's Socialist Party retained power with a narrow victory.

After Milošević's defeat in the Yugoslavian election, a new Serbian parliamentary election was called for December 2000. Petrović appeared in the 222nd position on the DOS"s electoral list. The list won a majority victory with 176 out of 250 seats. From 2000 to 2011, parliamentary mandates were awarded to sponsoring parties or coalitions rather than to individual candidates, and it was common practice for the mandates to be awarded out of numerical order; Petrović could have been given a mandate when the assembly met in January 2001 despite his low position on the list, but he was not.

The Socialist Party was not able to oversee a stable government in Titel following the 2000 local elections, and a new election was held in the municipality in November 2001. The Democratic Opposition of Serbia won a majority of seats, and Petrović was selected as mayor.

Several members of the national assembly voluntarily resigned or were deprived of their mandates on 12 June 2002, amid the backdrop of serious divisions between the DOS and the Democratic Party of Serbia (Demokratska stranka Sribje, DSS). Petrović was awarded a mandate as the replacement for another member and served, in this capacity, as part of the administration's parliamentary majority. The resignations and expulsions of 12 June 2002 were later overturned on a technicality; the delegates who left the assembly on that day had their mandates restored, and the mandates of the replacements were revoked.

The DS fielded its own electoral list in the 2003 parliamentary election. Petrović appeared in the 161st position. The list won thirty-seven seats, and he was not included in his party's assembly delegation.

=== Second term as mayor (2004–08) ===
Serbia introduced direct elections for mayor and separated the positions of mayor and assembly president in the 2004 local elections. Petrović was re-elected as mayor of Titel, defeating a candidate of the far-right Serbian Radical Party in the second round. He also appeared on the DS's list for the Assembly of Vojvodina in 2004 Vojvodina provincial election, in which half the seats were determined by proportional representation. He was not selected for a mandate on this occasion. He appeared on the DS's list in the 2007 Serbian parliamentary election and was again not included in his party's delegation.

Titel was one of the least affluent municipalities in Vojvodina during the 2000s. In a 2007 interview, Petrović spoke about the need to increase the area's tourist potential and expressed surprise and disappointment that the municipality did not qualify for poverty relief funding.

=== Provincial representative and third term as mayor (2008–12) ===
The direct election of mayors was abandoned after 2004, and in all subsequent electoral cycles mayors have been chosen by the elected members of city and municipal assemblies. Petrović was selected for a third term as mayor after the 2008 local elections. The Radical Party actually won the election in Titel but, with eleven seats out of twenty-five, fell short of a majority; the DS, which finished second with nine seats, was able to form a new coalition government with the Socialist Party of Serbia and two independent delegates. Petrović was also elected to the provincial assembly for the Titel constituency seat in the 2008 provincial election as a candidate of the For a European Vojvodina alliance led by the DS. For a European Vojvodina won an outright majority, and Petrović supported the administration in the assembly over the next four years.

Serbia's electoral laws were reformed in 2011 such that mandates were awarded to candidates on successful lists in numerical order. Petrović led the DS list for Titel in the 2012 Serbian local elections. The list won six seats; the Serbian Progressive Party won the election and was able to form a new administration, with the DS serving in opposition. Petrović was also defeated in his bid for re-election to the Vojvodina assembly in the 2012 provincial election, finishing third against Vladimir Soro, a Movement of Socialists candidate endorsed by the Progressive Party.

The Democratic Party and its allies were the overall winners of the 2012 provincial election, and Petrović was subsequently appointed as assistant provincial secretary for agriculture, water management, and forestry in the government of Vojvodina. He has not sought a return to elected office since 2012.

== Electoral record ==
=== Provincial (Vojvodina) ===
2012 Vojvodina assembly election Titel (constituency seat) – First and second rounds
Candidate	Party or Coalition	Votes	%	Votes	%
Vladimir Soro	Let's Get Vojvodina Moving–Tomislav Nikolić (Serbian Progressive Party, New Serbia, Movement of Socialists, Strength of Serbia Movement) (Affiliation: Movement of Socialists)	2,731	30.44	4,340	54.50
Dejan Kulja	United Regions of Serbia–Dejan Kulja	1,758	19.59	3,623	45.50
Milivoj Petrović Pele (incumbent)	Choice for a Better Vojvodina–Bojan Pajtić (Affiliation: Democratic Party)	1,658	18.48		
Milorad Jovančević Rajko	Serbian Radical Party	844	9.41		
Duško Kajtez	Democratic Party of Serbia	559	6.23		
Marko Simić	League of Social Democrats of Vojvodina–Nenad Čanak	533	5.94		
Dušan Tubić	Citizens' Group: Dveri: For the Life of Titel	466	5.19		
Stevan Curčić	Socialist Party of Serbia (SPS), Party of United Pensioners of Serbia (PUPS), United Serbia (JS), Social Democratic Party of Serbia (SDPS)	423	4.71		
Total valid votes		8,972	100	7,963	100

2008 Vojvodina assembly election Titel (constituency seat) – First and second rounds
Candidate	Party or Coalition	Votes	%	Votes	%
Milivoj Petrović	"For a European Vojvodina: Democratic Party–G17 Plus, Boris Tadić" (Affiliation: Democratic Party)	2,420	29.49	3,230	50.84
Ivana Zečević	Serbian Radical Party	3,165	38.56	3,123	49.16
Duško Kajtez	Democratic Party of Serbia	1,064	12.96		
Vladimir Soro	Socialist Party of Serbia (SPS)–Party of United Pensioners of Serbia (PUPS) (Affiliation: Socialist Party of Serbia)	1,041	12.68		
Aleksandar Milinkov	Together for Vojvodina–Nenad Čanak	517	6.30		
Total valid votes		8,207	100	6,353	100
Invalid ballots		448		149	
Total votes casts		8,655	68.44	6,502	51.42

=== Municipal (Titel) ===
2004 Titel municipal election Mayor of Titel – second round results
Candidate	Party or Coalition	Votes	%
Milivoj Petrović	Democratic Party–Boris Tadić	2,731	51.28
Ivana Zečević	Serbian Radical Party	2,595	48.72
Total valid votes		5,326	100
