= Krkobabić =

Krkobabić (Cyrillic: Кркобабић) is a surname of Serbian origin. Notable people with the surname include:

- Jovan Krkobabić (1930–2014), Serbian politician
- Milan Krkobabić (born 1952), Serbian politician
- Stefan Krkobabić (born 1989), Serbian politician
