= Ljubinko Rakonjac =

Serbian politician

Ljubinko Rakonjac (Serbian Cyrillic: Љубинко Ракоњац; born June 3, 1963) is a scientist and politician in Serbia. He has served in the National Assembly of Serbia since 2016 as a member of the Greens of Serbia (Zeleni Srbije, ZS).

== Early life and career ==
Rakonjac was born in Belgrade, in what was then the Socialist Republic of Serbia in the Socialist Federal Republic of Yugoslavia. He holds a bachelor's degree (1988), a master's degree (1993), and a Ph.D. (2002) from the University of Belgrade Faculty of Forestry. According to his party biography, his doctoral dissertation was entitled, "Forest vegetation and its habitats at the Pešter plain as the basis for successful afforestation." He has worked at Belgrade's Forestry Institute since 1990 and has been its director since 2004. From 2002 to 2004, he was an assistant to the Serbian minister of natural resources and environmental protection. Rakonjac is a member of several professional institutions and has published over one hundred scientific papers.

== Political career ==
The Greens of Serbia contested the 2016 Serbian parliamentary election on an electoral list led by the Socialist Party of Serbia. Rakonjac received the twenty-fifth position on the list and was elected when it won twenty-nine mandates. Initially, Rakonjac and party leader Ivan Karić were the only ZS candidates elected in 2016. Karić subsequently resigned and was succeeded by a member of the Socialist Party, leaving Rakonjac as his party's sole parliamentary representative. He sits with the Socialist Party's parliamentary group and, as the Socialists are part of Serbia's coalition government, is a member of the government's parliamentary majority.

Rakonjac is a member of the assembly's environmental protection committee; a deputy member of the agriculture, forestry, and water management committee and the committee on education, science, technological development, and the information society; and a member of the parliamentary friendship groups with Austria, Belarus, Bulgaria, Denmark, Finland, Iran, Italy, Russia, and Slovakia.
