= Ivana Zečević =

Serbian politician

Ivana Zečević (Serbian Cyrillic: Ивана Зечевић; born 24 July 1961) is a politician in Serbia. She served in the National Assembly of Serbia from 2007 to 2008 and the Assembly of Vojvodina from 2014 to 2020, and she is currently a member of the Titel municipal assembly. Zečević is a member of the far-right Serbian Radical Party.

== Early life and career ==
Zečević was born in Titel, Autonomous Province of Vojvodina, in what was then the People's Republic of Serbia in the Federal People's Republic of Yugoslavia. According to her party biography, she graduated high school in Novi Sad and was certified as a legal technician, and later graduated from the University of Belgrade Faculty of Philology (1985) with a focus in Arabic language and Arabic literature. She worked as a translator in Yugoslavia's Federal Secretariat for National Defence after her graduation and was stationed for eighteen months in Libya as a translator. She then worked at the military academy in Zagreb, Socialist Republic of Croatia.

With the breakup of Yugoslavia in the early 1990s, Zečević and her husband moved to Banja Luka in Bosnia and Herzegovina. Both enlisted as volunteers in the Serb forces in the early stages of the Bosnian War. She returned to Serbia in 1992 and joined the Radical Party in 1994. In 1998, she became director of the public company, Prostor.

== Politician ==
=== Early years ===
Zečević sought election to the Assembly of the Federal Republic of Yugoslavia's Chamber of Citizens in the 2000 Yugoslavian general election, appearing in the lead position on the Radical Party's electoral list for the Vrbas division. The list did not win any mandates. She was also a candidate for the Titel municipal assembly in the concurrent 2000 Serbian local elections, running in the community's eighth division. (This was the last local electoral cycle in Serbia in which candidates were elected in single-member constituencies. All subsequent local elections have been held under proportional representation.)

The 2000 Yugoslavian general election was a landmark event in Serbian and Yugoslavian politics, resulting in the fall of Slobodan Milošević's administration. A new Serbian parliamentary election was subsequently called for December 2000, and Zečević appeared in the 229th position (out of 250) on the Radical Party's list. The list won twenty-three mandates, and she was not included in the party's assembly delegation. (From 2000 to 2011, mandates in Serbian parliamentary elections were awarded to sponsoring parties or coalitions rather than individual candidates, and it was common practice for the mandates to be assigned out of numerical order. Zečević could have been awarded a mandate despite her low position on the list, although in the event she was not.) She later appeared in the ninety-second position on the party's list in the 2003 Serbian parliamentary election and was once again not chosen for a mandate.

=== Parliamentarian ===
Zečević was given the ninety-sixth position on the Radical Party's list in the 2007 Serbian parliamentary election. The list won eighty-one seats, and on this occasion she was selected for a mandate. Although the Radicals won more seats than any other party in the 2007 election, they fell well short of a majority and served in opposition in the parliament that followed.

Following the 2007 election, an unstable coalition government was formed by the Democratic Party, the rival Democratic Party of Serbia, and G17 Plus. The coalition fell apart in early 2008, and a new election was called for May 2008. Zečević once again appeared on the Radical list and was not granted a mandate for a second term. The Radical Party experienced a serious split later in 2008, with several members joining the more moderate Serbian Progressive Party under the leadership of Tomislav Nikolić and Aleksandar Vučić. Zečević remained with the Radicals.

Serbia's electoral system was reformed in 2011, such that mandates were awarded in numerical order to candidates on successful lists. Zečević appeared in the 108th position on the Radical Party's list in the 2012 parliamentary election and the eighteenth position in the 2014 election. On both occasions, the lists failed to cross the electoral threshold to win representation in the assembly.

=== Provincial politics ===
From 2004 to 2012, elections in Vojvodina took place under a system of mixed proportional representation, in which half the mandates were determined by elections in single-member constituencies. Zečević sought election in the Titel division in the 2008 provincial election and was narrowly defeated in the second round. She later appeared in the sixth position on the party's electoral list in the 2012 provincial election and was not immediately elected when the party won five proportional mandates. She later received a mandate on 14 May 2014, after three party delegates resigned from the assembly. She led the party's reconstructed assembly group for the next two years. Vojvodina's government at the time was led by the Democratic Party, and the Radicals served in opposition.

Zečević again appeared in the sixth position on the Radical Party's list in the 2016 provincial election and was re-elected when the party won ten mandates. The Progressive Party and its allies won a majority government, and the Radicals continued to serve in opposition.

In the 2020 Vojvodina provincial election, Zečević appeared in the thirteen position on the Radical list. The party won four seats, and she was not returned. It is possible, although unlikely, that she could re-enter the assembly in the current term as the replacement for another Radical Party member.

=== Local politics since 2004 ===
Zečević was the Radical Party's candidate for mayor of Titel in the 2004 Serbian local elections, the only electoral cycle since World War II in which mayors were directly elected. She was defeated by Milivoj Petrović of the Democratic Party in the second round of voting.

The Radicals won eleven out of twenty-five seats in the Titel municipal assembly in the 2008 local elections, and Zečević led the party's delegation. Although the Radicals won a plurality victory, they could not form a governing coalition and again served in opposition.

Zečević led the Radical Party's list for Titel in the 2012 local elections and was re-elected when the list won two mandates. The Radicals initially remained in opposition, but in December 2014 the party joined a municipal coalition government led by the Progressive Party, and Zečević became the president (i.e., speaker) of the municipal assembly, a role that she held for the next two years.

She again led the Radical Party lists for Titel in the 2016 and 2020 local elections and was re-elected both times when the party respectively won two and one mandates. The Progressive Party and its allies won majority governments each time. She continues to serve in the assembly as of 2021.

== Electoral record ==
=== Provincial Vojvodina) ===
2008 Vojvodina assembly election Titel (constituency seat) - First and Second Rounds
Candidate	Party or Coalition	Votes	%	Votes	%
Milivoj Petrović	"For a European Vojvodina: Democratic Party–G17 Plus, Boris Tadić" (Affiliation: Democratic Party)	2,420	29.49	3,230	50.84
Ivana Zečević	Serbian Radical Party	3,165	38.56	3,123	49.16
Duško Kajtez	Democratic Party of Serbia	1,064	12.96		
Vladimir Soro	Socialist Party of Serbia (SPS)–Party of United Pensioners of Serbia (PUPS) (Affiliation: Socialist Party of Serbia)	1,041	12.68		
Aleksandar Milinkov	Together for Vojvodina–Nenad Čanak	517	6.30		
Total valid votes		8,207	100	6,353	100
Invalid ballots		448		149	
Total votes casts		8,655	68.44	6,502	51.42

=== Municipal (Titel) ===
2004 Titel municipal election Mayor of Titel – Second Round Results
Candidate	Party or Coalition	Votes	%
Milivoj Petrović	Democratic Party–Boris Tadić	2,731	51.28
Ivana Zečević	Serbian Radical Party	2,595	48.72
Total valid votes		5,326	100
Sources: ЛОКАЛНИ ИЗБОРИ: Председници општина и градова, изабрани на локалним изборима, 2004.,, Statistical Office of the Republic of Serbia, 3 October 2010, accessed 12 July 2021; Lokalni Izbori u Srbiji 2004,, Center for Free Elections and Democracy, 29 July 2007, accessed 25 July 2021.
