= Stefan Srbljanović =

Serbian politician

Stefan Srbljanović (Serbian Cyrillic: Стефан Србљановић; born 1989) is a politician in Serbia. He was elected to the National Assembly of Serbia in the 2020 parliamentary election as a member of the Serbian Progressive Party.

== Early life and career ==
Srbljanović was born in Priboj, in what was then the Socialist Republic of Serbia in the Socialist Federal Republic of Yugoslavia. He has a degree in political science.

== Politician ==
Srbljanović has been a member of the Progressive Party's municipal board in Priboj since 2014 and has participated in the party's Academy of Young Leaders program.

=== Parliamentarian ===
He was awarded the eleventh position on the Progressive Party's Aleksandar Vučić — For Our Children electoral list for the 2020 Serbian parliamentary election. This was tantamount to election, and he was indeed elected when the list won a landslide majority with 188 mandates. He is now a member of the assembly's foreign affairs committee and the committee on human and minority rights and gender equality, a deputy member of the European integration committee and the committee on the diaspora and Serbs in the region, a deputy member of the European Union–Serbia stabilization and association committee, a substitute member of Serbia's delegation to the Parliamentary Assembly of the Council of Europe, the head of Serbia's parliamentary friendship group with Ukraine, and a member of the parliamentary friendship groups with China, France, Germany, Israel, Italy, Norway, Russia, Spain, Sweden, the United Arab Emirates, the United Kingdom, and the United States of America.

He is not to be confused with a different Stefan Srbljanović from Priboj, a member of United Serbia who has served on the municipality's municipal council.
