= Milivoje Petrović =

Milivoje Petrović may refer to:

- Milivoje Petrović Blaznavac, Serbian general and politician
- Milivoje Petrović, Serbian musician and composer, better known by his stage name Miško Plavi

== See also ==
- Milivoj Petrović, Serbian politician
