= Dalibor Marković (politician) =

Serbian politician

- Далибор Марковић

Personal details
- Born: 9 December 1979 (age 46) Svetozarevo, SR Serbia, SFR Yugoslavia
- Party: United Serbia
- Children: 3
- Parent: Dragan Marković (father)

Dalibor Marković (Serbian Cyrillic: Далибор Марковић; 9 December 1979) is a Serbian politician and businessman who is the leader of United Serbia (JS). His father Dragan Marković was the party's founder and long-time leader until his death in November 2024.

He is currently a member of the City Council of Jagodina in charge of the budget, economy and investments. In the 2026 parliamentary election, Marković was included in second place on the Factor of Stability electoral list led by the Socialist Party of Serbia (SPS).

== Personal life ==
Like his late father, Marković shares the nickname Palma (Serbian Cyrillic: Палма, lit. 'palm tree'). He is married and has three children.
