= Predrag J. Marković =

Serbian politician and historian

- Предраг Ј. Марковић
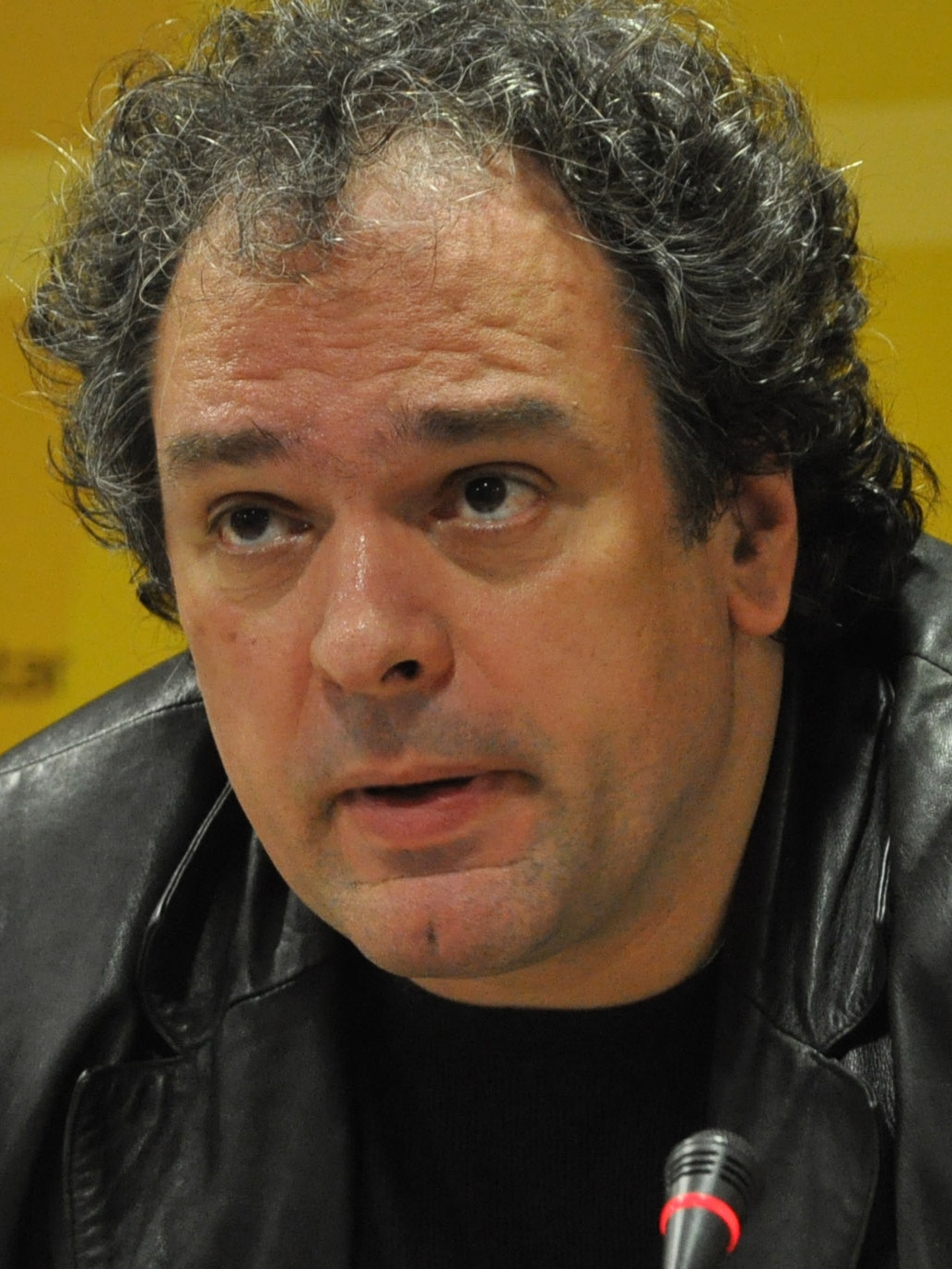
- Marković in 2015

Member of the National Assembly
- In office 3 August 2020 – 19 May 2021

Personal details
- Born: 6 September 1965 (age 61) Belgrade, SR Serbia, SFR Yugoslavia
- Party: DS (until 2014); DJB (2014–2015); SPS (2015–present)
- Children: 2
- Education: University of Belgrade
- Occupation: Politician
- Profession: Historian

Predrag J. Marković (born 6 September 1965) is a Serbian politician and historian. A member of the National Assembly of Serbia from 2020 to 2021, he is currently serving as one of the vice-presidents of the Socialist Party of Serbia.

== Early life ==
Marković was born on 6 September 1965 in Belgrade, SR Serbia, SFR Yugoslavia. He graduated history from the Faculty of Philosophy of the University of Belgrade in 1995.

== Career ==
Marković was a member of the Democratic Party until 2014, when he left the party and joined the Enough is Enough movement. He was its member until 2015 when he joined the Socialist Party of Serbia and became one of its vice-presidents.

He became a member of the National Assembly of Serbia after the 2020 parliamentary election, though he resigned on 19 May 2021.

== Personal life ==
He is married and has two children.

== Works ==
Books

- Beograd i Evropa 1918-1941. – Evropski uticaji na modernizaciju Belgradea, (Belgrade: Savremena administracija, 1992), 234.
- Beograd između Istoka i Zapada 1948-1965, (Belgrade: Službeni list 1996) 547.
- Sindikati Beograda 1945-1998,co-author sa V. Glišićem, M. Pavlovićem, M. Aćimovićem (Belgrade: Gradsko veće SSJ, 1999), 536
- Radna sveska iz istorije za 8. razred osnovne školeco-author sa K. Nikolićem, (Belgrade: Zavod za udžbenike i nastavna sredstva, 2002), 92 (prevedena na mađarski, rumunski i slovački; drugo prošireno izdanje 2004), 96.
- Ethnic Stereotypes: ubiquitous, local, or migrating phenomena? -The Serbian-Albanian Case, (Bonn:Michael Zikic Stiftung, 2003) 95 (drugo izdanje 2004)
- Moderna srpska država 1804-2004 : hronologija (The Modern Serbian State:A Chronology) (coauthor ) Belgrade : Istorijski arhiv Belgradea, 2004, 534
- Kosovo. Prošlost, Pamćenje, Stvarnost. (Kosovo: Past, Memory, Reality) co-author with M. Pavlović, (Belgrade-Novi Sad:Preporod, 2006), 564.
- Trajnost i promena. Društvena istorija socijalističke i postsocijalističke svakodnevice u Jugoslaviji i Srbiji , (Belgrade: Službeni glasnik, 2007), 184.
- Lišće i prašina , (Belgrade: Arhipelag, 2012), 268.
- Istorijske neprilike, (Belgrade: Arhipelag, 2018)
- Alternativna istorija Srbije, co-author with Čedomir Antić, (Belgrade: Službeni glasnik, 2007), 264.
