= Greens of Serbia =

Political party in Serbia

Greens of Serbia Зелени Србије Zeleni Srbije
- Abbreviation: Zeleni
- President: Ivan Karić
- Vice-president: Zoran Rakočević
- Founded: November 2007
- Headquarters: Kralja Milana 7, Belgrade
- Ideology: Green politics; Social democracy
- Political position: Centre-left
- National affiliation: Factor of Stability (2016–present); Choice for a Better Life (2012)
- Parliamentary group: SPS–Zeleni
- Colours: Green
- National Assembly: 0 / 250
- Assembly of Vojvodina: 0 / 120

Website
- zelenisrbije.org

The Greens of Serbia (Serbian: Зелени Србије, romanised: Zeleni Srbije, abbr. Zeleni) is a green political party in Serbia, founded in November 2007 and led by Ivan Karić. The party advocates environmental protection, social justice, direct democracy, green economics, sustainability, and human rights. It had observer status in the Global Greens and applied to join the European Green Party.

The party first entered the National Assembly in 2012 as part of the Democratic Party-led Choice for a Better Life alliance. In 2014, it briefly merged with Boris Tadić's New Democratic Party as the New Democratic Party–Greens, before becoming independent again later that year. Since 2016, it has been part of the electoral alliance led by the Socialist Party of Serbia (SPS), which ran as the Factor of Stability in 2026.

== History ==
=== 2007–2013: Foundation and entry into parliament ===
The Greens of Serbia was founded in November 2007, making it the oldest active green party in Serbia. In March 2010, it completed its re-registration by collecting 13,500 signatures. The party is organised in local and municipal units known as movements, of which there were over 80 across Serbia. In 2010, it won 2% of the vote in the local election in Bor, and it also had a councillor in Pančevo.

In 2011, the party launched a campaign against genetically modified food. On 26 October 2011, it submitted to the National Assembly a petition signed by more than 35,000 citizens calling for a ban on the production, import, use, and sale of genetically modified organisms (GMOs), together with a draft law to that effect; Karić described it as a civic rather than a party initiative. In November 2012, it began collecting signatures in Novi Sad for a petition to declare Novi Sad and Vojvodina free of GMOs. The following month, it presented a declaration calling for municipalities, cities, and regions of Serbia to be proclaimed GMO-free zones, modelled on those in the European Union, and called for a moratorium on GMOs, arguing that Serbian institutions were not sufficiently prepared to deal with their risks. In October 2013, after a two-month campaign, the party submitted a petition with almost 18,000 signatures to István Pásztor, the president of the Assembly of Vojvodina, asking it to introduce a moratorium on the use of GMOs in the province.

In the 2012 parliamentary election, the party contested the election as part of the Choice for a Better Life alliance, which won 23.1% of the vote and 67 seats. One seat went to Karić, the party's first in the National Assembly.

=== 2014: New Democratic Party–Greens ===
In early February 2014, the party agreed to join Boris Tadić's newly formed New Democratic Party in an electoral union. It adopted a new statute on 10 February 2014 and changed its name to New Democratic Party–Greens, with Tadić as its leader. After the National Assembly was constituted following the 2014 election, the New Democratic Party left the union and registered separately as the Social Democratic Party, and on 14 June 2014 the party reverted to the name Greens of Serbia.

=== 2016–present: Alliance with SPS ===
In February 2016, the party formed a coalition with the Socialist Party of Serbia and United Serbia, and two of its candidates, Karić and Ljubinko Rakonjac, were elected in the 2016 election. The party has remained in the SPS-led alliance since then, contesting the 2020, 2022, and 2023 elections on its list; Karić has said that the party is often criticised for always being part of the ruling coalition. For the 2026 snap election, the alliance, joined by the Social Democratic Party of Serbia, ran as "Ivica Dačić – Factor of Stability!".

== Electoral performance ==
=== Parliamentary results ===
National Assembly of Serbia
Year	Leader	Popular vote	% of popular vote	#	# of seats	Seat change	Coalition	Status
2008	Ivan Karić	did not participate			0 / 250	0	–	Extra-parliamentary
2012	Ivan Karić	863,294	23.09%	▲2nd	1 / 250	▲1	IZBŽ	Opposition
2014	Boris Tadić	204,767	5.89%	▼4th	1 / 250	0	Zeleni–NDS–LSV–ZZS–VMDK	Opposition
2016	Ivan Karić	413,770	11.28%	▲2nd	2 / 250	▲1	SPS–JS–KP–Zeleni	Support
2020	Ivan Karić	334,333	10.78%	2nd	1 / 250	▼1	SPS–JS–KP–Zeleni	Support
2022	Ivan Karić	435,274	11.79%	▼3rd	1 / 250	0	SPS–JS–Zeleni	Support
2023	Ivan Karić	249,916	6.73%	3rd	1 / 250	0	SPS–JS–Zeleni	Support
2026	Ivan Karić	94,766	2.16%	3rd	0 / 250	▼1	SPS–JS–SDPS–Zeleni	Extra-parliamentary

View source data.

=== Presidential elections ===
President of Serbia
Year	Candidate	1st round popular vote		% of popular vote	2nd round popular vote		% of popular vote	Notes
2012	Boris Tadić	1st	989,454	26.50%	2nd	1,481,952	48.84%	Supported Tadić
2017	Aleksandar Vučić	1st	2,012,788	56.01%	—N/a	—	—	Supported Vučić
2022	Aleksandar Vučić	1st	2,224,914	60.01%	—N/a	—	—	Supported Vučić
