= Stefan Krkobabić =

Serbian politician

Stefan Krkobabić (Serbian Cyrillic: Стефан Кркобабић; born 23 February 1989) is a politician in Serbia. He has served in the National Assembly of Serbia since 2020 as a member of the Party of United Pensioners of Serbia (PUPS) and is currently a vice-president (i.e., deputy speaker) of the assembly.

== Early life and private career ==
Krkobabić is the son of PUPS leader Milan Krkobabić and the grandson of party founder Jovan Krkobabić. He graduated from Megatrend University's Faculty of Culture and Media in 2011 and subsequently worked at the Belgrade Chamber of Commerce. He was appointed acting director of the Public Company for the Development of Mountain Tourism "Stara planina" in 2019 and served in this role until late 2020, when he was removed from office at his own request. He lives in Belgrade.

== Politician ==
The PUPS contested the 2020 Serbian parliamentary election in an alliance with the Serbian Progressive Party. Krkobabić received the 113th position on the Progressive Party's Aleksandar Vučić — For Our Children coalition list and was elected when the list won a landslide majority with 188 out of 250 mandates. He was chosen as a deputy speaker following the election and is also a member of the foreign affairs committee and the committee on the rights of the child; a deputy member of the committee on administrative, budgetary, mandate, and immunity issues; a substitute member of Serbia's delegation to the Parliamentary Assembly of the Council of Europe (PACE); and a member of the parliamentary friendship groups with the Czech Republic, Italy, Latvia, Spain, and the United States of America.
