= Branimir Jovanović =

Serbian politician

Branimir Jovanović (Serbian Cyrillic: Бранимир Јовановић; born 1979) is a politician in Serbia. He has served in the National Assembly of Serbia since 2016 as a member of the Social Democratic Party of Serbia (SDPS).

== Private career ==
Jovanović is a political scientist. He lives in Kraljevo.

== Politician ==
=== Municipal politics ===
The SDPS participated in the 2012 Serbian local elections in Kraljevo as part of the Democratic Party's Choice for a Better Life coalition electoral list. Jovanović received the seventh position on the list and was elected to the Kraljevo city assembly when the alliance won thirteen mandates. He did not seek re-election at the local level in 2016.

=== Parliamentarian ===
The SDPS contested the 2016 Serbian parliamentary election on the Serbian Progressive Party's Aleksandar Vučić – Serbia Is Winning list. Jovanović received the eightieth position and was elected when the list won a majority victory with 131 out of 250 seats. During the 2016–20 parliament, he was a member of the committee on administrative, budgetary, mandate, and immunity issues; a deputy member of the committee on the diaspora and Serbs in the region; a member of Serbia's delegation to the Parliamentary Assembly of the Organization for Security and Co-operation in Europe (OSCE PSA); and a member of the parliamentary friendship groups with Algeria, Belarus, Canada, Germany, Hungary, Japan, Norway, Pakistan, Russia, Slovenia, Turkey, and the United States of America.

He was given the ninety-ninth position on the Progressive Party's Aleksandar Vučić — For Our Children list in the 2020 election and was elected to a second term when the list won a landslide majority with 188 mandates. He is now the leader of the SDLP parliamentary group in the assembly and is a member of the committee on administrative, budgetary, mandate, and immunity issues; a deputy member of the defence and internal affairs committee; a deputy member of the committee on the economy, regional development, trade, tourism, and energy; a deputy member of the committee on the rights of the child; a deputy member of Serbia's delegation to the NATO Parliamentary Assembly (where Serbia has observer status); the head of Serbia's parliamentary friendship group with Uzbekistan; and a member of the parliamentary friendship groups with Canada, China, Germany, Hungary, Japan, Mauritius, Norway, Saint Vincent and the Grenadines, Turkey, the United States of America, and Uruguay.
