= Laslo Sekelj =

Laslo Sekelj (4 August 1949 – 29 November 2001) born in Subotica, Yugoslavia.

Laslo Sekelj studied philosophy, political science, and sociology at the Universities of Belgrade, Berlin, and Zagreb. He received his Ph.D. in sociology at the University of Zagreb (1983). He published a number of studies and articles on inter-ethnic tensions and Jewish identity in Yugoslavia. For many years he was a senior research fellow at the Institute for Philosophy and Social Theory at the University of Belgrade. As a member of the dissident "Praxis" group he was denied the right to teach.

He specialized in the study of Yugoslav self-management. In his major book, published in English: "Yugoslavia: the Process of Disintegration", he analyzed the different stages in the development of self-management and its demise. Another area of his specialization was the study of anarchism.

He directed a long-term project devoted to comparative aspects of the transformation process of the formerly Communist European countries.

In recent years he was a senior research fellow of the Belgrade Institute for European Studies, and spent several years as a Humboldt Foundation Research Fellow and Guest-Professor at the University of Göttingen.
