= Ivan Karić =

Serbian politician

- Иван Карић

Leader of the Greens of Serbia
- Incumbent
- Assumed office 2010

Member of the National Assembly of the Republic of Serbia
- Incumbent
- Assumed office 1 August 2022
- In office 31 May 2012 – 9 October 2017

Personal details
- Born: 19 September 1975 (age 50) Obrenovac, Belgrade, SR Serbia, SFR Yugoslavia
- Party: Zeleni (known as NDS–Zeleni from February to June 2014)

Ivan Karić (Serbian Cyrillic: Иван Карић; born 19 September 1975) is a Serbian politician. He is the leader of the Greens of Serbia (Zeleni) and is currently serving his fifth term in the Serbian parliament. From 2017 to 2022, he was a state secretary in Serbia's ministry of environmental protection. Karić is a member of the Socialist Party of Serbia (SPS) parliamentary group.

== Early life and career ==
Karić was born in the Belgrade municipality of Obrenovac, in what was then the Socialist Republic of Serbia in the Socialist Federal Republic of Yugoslavia. He holds an engineering degree from the geology department of the University of Belgrade Faculty of Mining and Geology, was president of the Young Researchers of Serbia from 2001 to 2005, and was deputy director of Obrenovac's Environmental Protection Fund from 2004 to 2008. Karić worked for the public water utility Beogrаdvode from 2008 to 2012, serving as advisor to the general director and head of flood defence for the City of Belgrade.

== Politician ==
=== Early years (2008–12) ===
Karić led an electoral list called Green Obrenovac in the 2008 Serbian local elections, running for election to the Obrenovac municipal assembly. The list narrowly missed crossing the electoral threshold for assembly representation.

Greens of Serbia was founded in 2007 but was largely dormant until 2010, when all parties in Serbia were required to re-register. The party became a gathering point for other green parties and non-governmental organizations during the re-registration process and emerged as a much more cohesive organization. Karić became the party leader in this period. In a June 2010 interview with Vreme, he situated the party in the modern European green tradition, saying, "just as we need alternative energy sources, we also need new energy in politics."

=== Parliamentarian (2012–17) ===
Zeleni signed a cooperation accord with Boris Tadić's Democratic Party in April 2012, agreeing to support the DS at all levels of government in Serbia's upcoming elections while working with the DS on various environmental initiatives. Karić said of the agreement, "We want to be a partner of the Democratic Party, which will lead Serbia on its European path."

He received the fifty-second position on the DS-led Choice for a Better Life electoral list in the 2012 Serbian parliamentary election and was elected as the party's first assembly representative when the list won sixty-seven seats. The Let's Get Serbia Moving coalition led by the Serbian Progressive Party (SNS) won the election and afterward formed a coalition government with the Socialist Party of Serbia and other parties. Karić served in opposition with the parliamentary group of the Democratic Party. In his first term, he was a member of the environmental protection committee, a deputy member of the health and family committee, and a member of the parliamentary friendship groups with Austria, Germany, the Netherlands, Slovenia, and the Sovereign Order of Malta.

After entering parliament, Karić urged the Serbian government to create a separate environment ministry, noting that more than sixty per cent of the country's negotiations with the European Union (EU) related to agriculture and ecology. He urged the Serbian government to extend the country's moratorium on nuclear power in late 2012, after the president of the Serbian Academy of Sciences and Arts said that it would be reviewed in three years' time. Karić was quoted as saying, "Japan has perhaps the most advanced technology [in the world], but even this technology could not stand up to the earthquake and the tsunami. Nuclear power plants in Europe go through rigorous tests and most of them would not withstand a serious earthquake." He later said that Serbia should postpone its talks to join the World Trade Organization (WTO) rather than succumbing to pressure from that organization to overturn a ban on genetically modified foods.

The Democratic Party split in early 2014, with Tadić leading a breakaway group originally called the New Democratic Party (NDS). As there was no time for the NDS to be registered prior to the 2014 parliamentary election, Tadić worked out an agreement for his party to join the Greens of Serbia collectively, with the party being renamed as "New Democratic Party–Greens." Karić remained the nominal president of the party, although it was generally accepted that Tadić was its real leader. The restructured NDS–Zeleni party contested the 2014 election at the head of a broader coalition around Tadić's leadership. Karić received the thirteenth position on the coalition's list and was re-elected when list won eighteen mandates. The NDS–Zeleni alliance was always intended as a short-term arrangement, and the parties separated again after the election (although there was initially some controversy as to how this would occur).

The SNS won a majority victory in 2014 and afterward formed a new coalition government with the Socialists and other parties. Zeleni remained in opposition. Karić served in a parliamentary group with Tadić's party, which was renamed in late 2014 as the Social Democratic Party (SDS). In this term, he was deputy chair of the environmental protection committee, a member of the economy committee, (Note: Formally known as the Committee on the Economy, Regional Development, Trade, Tourism, and Energy.) a deputy member of the agriculture committee, (Note: Formally known as the Committee on Agriculture, Forestry, and Water Management.) the president of Serbia's parliamentary friendship group with Norway, and a member of the friendship groups with Austria, Germany, and the Netherlands. He welcomed the victory of Syriza in the January 2015 Greek parliamentary election, saying that the victory was important for the Balkans and for Europe.

In February 2016, Karić left the Social Democratic Party caucus to join that of the Socialist Party of Serbia. In announcing his decision, he said that Zeleni's "common value determinant" with the SPS was "the idea of social democracy and sustainable development." Zeleni contested the 2016 Serbian parliamentary election as part of the SPS's list; Karić appeared in the ninth position and was re-elected when the list won twenty-nine seats. The Progressives won another majority government and again formed a coalition with the Socialists, and Karić served as a government supporter. In his third term, he was a member of the environmental protection committee, a deputy member of the spatial planning committee (Note: Formally known as the Committee on the Spatial Planning, Transport, Infrastructure, and Telecommunications) and the European integration committee, a deputy member of Serbia's delegation to the Parliamentary Assembly of the Organization for Security and Co-operation in Europe (OSCE PA), once again the leader of its friendship group with Norway, and a member of the friendship groups with Australia, Austria, Canada, China, Denmark, Germany, Greece, Iran, the Netherlands, and South Africa.

There were rumours that Karić would contest the 2017 Serbian presidential election, though ultimately this did not happen.

=== State secretary (2017–22) ===
Serbia created a new ministry of environmental protection in June 2017. On 6 October of the same year, Karić was named as a state secretary in the ministry. He was required to resign from parliament by virtue of accepting this position, and his resignation took effect on 9 October.

Karić's primary responsibility as state secretary was overseeing negotiations over Serbia's compliance with Chapter 27 (environment and climate change) in its accession process with the European Union. He outlined his priorities in a detailed article published in CorD magazine in March 2018; among other things, he wrote that Serbia would need to "pay particular attention to its environmental preventive activities and the 'polluter pays' principle" going forward. In a follow-up article in June 2019, he said that Chapter 27 was the most technically complicated and expensive chapter in Serbia's EU negotiations, with over two hundred regulations that needed to be implemented. Serbia ultimately submitted its negotiating position in January 2020.

In November 2018, Karić said that his department had drafted a new law to ban the construction of small hydro power plants in protected areas.

The Serbian Progressive Party won another majority victory in the 2020 Serbian parliamentary election (in which Karić was not a candidate) and afterward formed another coalition government with the Socialists. Karić was confirmed after the election for another term as a state secretary. He continued to oversee Serbia's negotiations in relation to Chapter 27, and in April 2021 he remarked that EU accession would allow Serbia to improve and harmonize its environmental standards. He also indicated his support for the Green Agenda for the Western Balkans in this period.

=== Return to parliament (2022–present) ===
The Greens of Serbia continued their alliance with the Socialists into the 2022 Serbian parliamentary election. Karić appeared in the eighteenth position on the SPS list and was re-elected when the list won thirty-one seats. The SNS won a plurality victory and once again formed a coalition government with the Socialists; this time, Karić was not re-appointed as a state secretary but once again served as an assembly member in the SPS's parliamentary group. In his fourth term, he was a member of the environmental protection committee, a deputy member of the agriculture committee and the European integration committee, and a member of Serbia's friendship groups with Angola, Austria, Denmark, Ethiopia, Germany, Greece, Liberia, Norway, the countries of Southeast Asia (Brunei Darussalam, Singapore, Thailand, and Timor-Leste), Sudan, Trinidad and Tobago, and Tunisia.

Karić again received the eighteenth position on the SPS's coalition list in the 2023 parliamentary election and was re-elected when the list won exactly eighteen seats. The Socialists continued their participation in Serbia's SNS-led government after the election, and Karić is once again a government supporter. He is a member of the environmental protection committee; a deputy member of the agriculture committee, the committee on the rights of the child, and the committee on human and minority rights and gender equality; a deputy member of Serbia's delegation to the NATO parliamentary assembly (where Serbia has observer status); and a member of Serbia's friendship groups with Armenia, Austria, Belarus, Brazil, the Czech Republic, Greece, Italy and the Holy See, Nicaragua, Norway, Portugal, Slovakia, South Korea, and Spain.
