= Jovan Krkobabić =

Serbian politician

- Јован Кркобабић
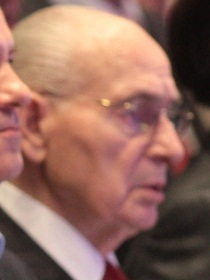
- Krkobabić, 2010

Deputy Prime Minister of Government of Serbia
- In office 7 July 2008 – 22 April 2014
- Prime Minister: Mirko Cvetković; Ivica Dačić
- Preceded by: Ivana Dulić-Marković
- Succeeded by: Zorana Mihajlović

Minister of Labour, Employment and Social Policies
- In office 27 July 2012 – 22 April 2014
- Preceded by: Rasim Ljajić
- Succeeded by: Aleksandar Vulin

Personal details
- Born: February 27, 1930 Koljane, Kingdom of Yugoslavia (now Croatia)
- Died: 22 April 2014 (aged 84) Belgrade, Serbia
- Party: Party of United Pensioners of Serbia

Jovan Krkobabić (Note: Serbian Cyrillic: Јован Кркобабић, pronounced [jǒʋan krkǒbabitɕ]) (27 February 1930 – 22 April 2014) was a Serbian politician. He was the leader of the Party of United Pensioners of Serbia, Deputy Prime Minister of Serbia in charge of social affairs, appointed on 7 July 2008 and Minister of Labour, Employment and Social Policies from 27 July 2012 until his death on 22 April 2014.

== Personal life ==
His surname derived from the last name Babić of his ancestors who lived near Krka river in Skradin.

== Career ==
Krkobabić graduated from the University of Belgrade's Faculty of Political Sciences, where he earned his doctoral degree.

His party contested the 2007 Serbian parliamentary election together with Nebojša Čović's Social Democratic Party and won no seats. PUPS also took part in 2008 parliamentary election coalition with the Socialist Party of Serbia and United Serbia and won five seats.

== Death ==
Krkobabić died in 2014, aged 84. His successor as party leader is his son, Milan Krkobabić.

== Sources ==
- Biography on party website

Government offices
Preceded by Ivana Dulić-Marković	Deputy Prime Minister of Government of Serbia; 2008 – 2014	Succeeded by Zorana Mihajlović
Preceded by Rasim Ljajić	Minister of Labour, Employment and Social Policies of Serbia; 2012 – 2014	Succeeded by Aleksandar Vulin
