= Dragan Marković =

Serbian politician (1960–2024)

- Драган Марковић
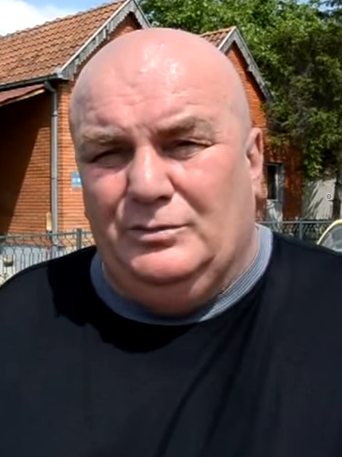
- Marković in 2014

Mayor of Jagodina
- In office 2004–2012
- Preceded by: Petar Jovanović
- Succeeded by: Ratko Stevanović

President of the Assembly of Jagodina
- In office 2012–2024
- Preceded by: Ratko Stevanović
- Succeeded by: to be determined

Personal details
- Born: Dragan Marković; 2 May 1960 Končarevo, PR Serbia, FPR Yugoslavia
- Died: 22 November 2024 (aged 64) Zemun, Belgrade, Serbia
- Party: Party of Serbian Unity (1993–2003); United Serbia (2004–2024)
- Spouse: Snežana Marković (m. 1979)
- Children: 2, including Dalibor
- Occupation: Politician
- Nickname: Palma

Dragan Marković (Serbian Cyrillic: Драган Марковић; 2 May 1960 – 22 November 2024), commonly known as Palma (Serbian Cyrillic: Палма, lit. 'palm tree'), was a Serbian businessman and politician. He served as a member of the National Assembly of Serbia and was the founder and the party leader of United Serbia (Jedinstvena Srbija).

== Biography ==
Dragan Marković Palma was born in 1960 In Končarevo, where he attended high school.

He worked as entrepreneur and owner of a company employing over a hundred workers, which included, in addition to the television station "Palma Plus" – which covers two-thirds of Serbia – a transport and trade company. He was named the best manager and entrepreneur in Serbia in 1995.

He entered political life in 1993 when he founded the Party of Serbian Unity with Željko Ražnatović "Arkan" and Borislav Pelević. He remained in that party until 2003. In 2004 he founded the United Serbia party, which won the most votes in Jagodina and Pomoravlje. In the 2007 parliamentary elections, he entered a coalition with the Democratic Party of Serbia and New Serbia. The United Serbia Party won two parliamentary seats.

Marković was the mayor of Jagodina from 2004 until 2012.

During his term, the municipality of Jagodina experienced major economic changes. For the first time, Jagodina got a zoo and an Aqua Park.

In June 2024, after the 2024 Serbian local elections, Marković was elected President of the City Assembly of Jagodina, the position he held until his death.

Marković died on 22 November 2024, at the age of 64.

== Controversies ==
Due to public statements against the LGBT population, Marković was sentenced by the First Basic Court in Belgrade in November 2011 for "severe discrimination", defined as "inciting inequality, hatred and intolerance based on sexual orientation".

On 19 April 2021, vice president of the Party of Freedom and Justice, Marinika Tepić, accused Palma and his partners of "prostitution of women and girls" in Jagodina. Tepić also revealed a video of the testimony of an anonymous man who is informed of the prostitution case. In the video he explained how everything was organized, who knew everything about cheating minors and which government members attended parties where prostitution was happening, claiming that all of this was happening in Hotel Končarevo whose "real owner" is Palma. Palma responded to these claims by calling them "lies" and announced that he will sue Tepić. Prosecutors announced that they would investigate the claims. On 23 April 2021, rector of the Megatrend University, Mića Jovanović, stated that he was present at a party where Palma "prostituted girls between the ages of 18 and 20 to state and municipal officials".
