= Social Democratic Party of Serbia =

Political party in Serbia

Social Democratic Party of Serbia Социјалдемократска партија Србије Socijaldemokratska partija Srbije
- Abbreviation: SDPS
- President: Jug Radivojević
- Parliamentary leader: Branimir Jovanović
- Founder: Rasim Ljajić
- Founded: 12 December 2009
- Headquarters: Dečanska 1/III, Belgrade
- Membership (2020): 48,623
- Ideology: Social democracy
- Political position: Centre-left
- National affiliation: Factor of Stability (2026–present); SNS coalition (2014–2026); Choice for a Better Life (2012)
- International affiliation: Socialist International
- Colours: Red (official); Pink (customary)
- National Assembly: 0 / 250
- Assembly of Vojvodina: 3 / 120
- City Assembly of Belgrade: 2 / 110
- Bosniak National Council: 12 / 35

Website
- sdpsrbije.org.rs

The Social Democratic Party of Serbia (SDPS; Serbian: Социјалдемократска партија Србије, romanised: Socijaldemokratska partija Srbije) is a centre-left political party in Serbia. Founded in 2009 by Rasim Ljajić, the long-time leader of the Sandžak Democratic Party (SDP), it describes itself as social democratic and has been a full member of the Socialist International since 2024.

After running with the Democratic Party in 2012, SDPS joined the government led by the Serbian Progressive Party (SNS) and contested every parliamentary election from 2014 to 2023 on the SNS list. Ljajić stepped down as party president in 2026 and was succeeded by theatre director Jug Radivojević. For the 2026 Serbian parliamentary election, SDPS joined the Factor of Stability coalition led by the Socialist Party of Serbia (SPS), while Ljajić led a separate minority list of the SDP. The Factor of Stability list failed to cross the electoral threshold.

== History ==
=== Formation ===
SDPS was founded at its first congress in Belgrade on 12 December 2009 by Rasim Ljajić, who had founded the Sandžak Democratic Party in 1994 (as the Coalition for Sandžak) after breaking away from the Party of Democratic Action. (Note: According to Istinomer, the party was founded on 5 October 2009, and its programme was adopted at the congress of 12 December 2009.) Ljajić was its president from its formation until 2026. In late 2013, SDPS and the Sandžak Democratic Party formed a political union, with Ljajić as its first head.

=== Alliance with SNS (2012–2026) ===
SDPS contested the 2012 Serbian parliamentary election as part of the Democratic Party-led Choice for a Better Life alliance, but after the election it aligned itself with the Serbian Progressive Party (SNS). From 2014 to 2023, it contested every parliamentary election on the SNS electoral list.

=== Leadership change and alliance with SPS (2026) ===
In mid-2026, Ljajić stepped down as president of SDPS. He said that he had frozen his party duties after becoming vice-president of the Partizan sports society in December 2022, and that the party needed a leader fully focused on the upcoming election campaign. He was succeeded by Jug Radivojević, a party vice-president and member since its foundation, who has been the director of the Belgrade Drama Theatre since 2019.

Radivojević and SPS leader Ivica Dačić then signed a memorandum of cooperation, which analysts described as a step away from SNS and as a way for both parties to cross the electoral threshold. On 8 September 2026, the SPS main board unanimously decided to contest the snap parliamentary election in a coalition with United Serbia, SDPS, and the Greens of Serbia. The coalition submitted its list, "Ivica Dačić – Factor of Stability!", on 12 September. Ljajić instead headed "Rasim Ljajić – Ljudski", a minority list of the Sandžak Democratic Party and the Montenegrin Democratic Party. In the election, the Factor of Stability list won 94,766 votes (2.16%) and failed to cross the 3% threshold, leaving SDPS without seats in the National Assembly, while Ljajić's list won one seat.

== Ideology and platform ==
SDPS is a centre-left party oriented towards social democracy. In 2023, Ljajić described SDPS as an anti-fascist, anti-populist, and solidarist party.

== Organisation ==
Its headquarters are at Dečanska 1/III in Belgrade. In 2011, SDPS reportedly had 44,658 members. In 2020, SDPS had 48,623 members.

=== International cooperation ===
In June 2018, SDPS was admitted to the Socialist International as an observer member, and it became a full member in December 2024.

== Electoral performance ==
=== Parliamentary elections ===
National Assembly of Serbia
Year	Leader	Popular vote	% of popular vote	#	# of seats	Seat change	Coalition	Status	Ref.
2012	Rasim Ljajić	863,294	23.09%	2nd	9 / 250	▲5	IZBŽ	Government	
2014	Rasim Ljajić	1,736,920	49.96%	▲1st	10 / 250	▲1	BKV	Government	
2016	Rasim Ljajić	1,823,147	49.71%	1st	10 / 250	0	SP	Government	
2020	Rasim Ljajić	1,953,998	63.02%	1st	8 / 250	▼2	ZND	Government	
2022	Rasim Ljajić	1,635,101	44.27%	1st	7 / 250	▼1	ZMS	Government	
2023	Rasim Ljajić	1,783,701	48.07%	1st	6 / 250	▼1	SNSDS	Government	
2026	Jug Radivojević	94,766	2.16%	▼3rd	0 / 250	▼6	FS	Extra-parliamentary	

=== Presidential elections ===
President of Serbia
Year	Candidate	1st round popular vote		% of popular vote	2nd round popular vote		% of popular vote	Notes	Ref.
2012	Boris Tadić	1st	989,454	26.50%	2nd	1,481,952	48.84%	Supported Tadić	
2017	Aleksandar Vučić	1st	2,012,788	56.01%	—N/a	—	—	Supported Vučić	
2022	Aleksandar Vučić	1st	2,224,914	60.01%	—N/a	—	—	Supported Vučić	
