= PUPS – Solidarity and Justice =

Political party in Serbia

Party of United Pensioners, Farmers, and Proletarians of Serbia – Solidarity and Justice Партија уједињених пензионера, пољопривредника и пролетера Србије – солидарност и правда
- Abbreviation: PUPS – Solidarity and Justice
- President: Milan Krkobabić
- Founder: Jovan Krkobabić
- Founded: 10 May 2005; 21 years ago
- Headquarters: Topličin venac 11, Belgrade
- Membership (2015): 100,000
- Ideology: Pensioners' interests; Social conservatism
- National affiliation: United Serbia
- Colours: Red
- National Assembly: 3 / 250
- Assembly of Vojvodina: 3 / 120
- City Assembly of Belgrade: 3 / 110

Website
- pups.org.rs

The Party of United Pensioners, Farmers, and Proletarians of Serbia – Solidarity and Justice (Serbian: Партија уједињених пензионера, пољопривредника и пролетера Србије – солидарност и правда, romanised: Partija ujedinjenih penzionera, poljoprivrednika i proletera Srbije – solidarnost i pravda, abbr. PUPS) is a political party in Serbia that advocates for pensioners' interests.

Known as the Party of United Pensioners of Serbia until June 2022, it was founded in 2005 by Jovan Krkobabić and former members of the Socialist Party of Serbia (SPS). PUPS was part of the SPS-led coalition from 2008 to 2016, and has since run on the electoral lists led by the Serbian Progressive Party (SNS), most recently on "Aleksandar Vučić – United Serbia" in the 2026 parliamentary election. It has been led by Milan Krkobabić since 2014, and it also holds socially conservative views.

== History ==
=== Formation and early history ===
The party was registered on 10 May 2005 by Jovan Krkobabić and other pensioners who were previously members of the Socialist Party of Serbia (SPS) and its predecessor League of Communists of Serbia (SKS). They participated in the 2007 parliamentary election in a coalition with the Social Democratic Party that was led by Nebojša Čović and the Socialist People's Party. The coalition won 3.16% of the vote, short of the 5% electoral threshold then in force. In early 2008, they formed a coalition with SPS and United Serbia (JS) to participate in the 2008 parliamentary election. The coalition placed fourth with 7.75% of the vote and 20 seats in the National Assembly, five of which went to PUPS.

=== Coalition with SPS (2008–2016) ===
The SPS–PUPS–JS coalition formed a government with the Democratic Party (DS), and Jovan Krkobabić became a deputy prime minister, a post he held until his death in 2014. The coalition placed third in the 2012 parliamentary election with 15.18% of the vote and 44 seats, 12 of which went to PUPS. Krkobabić remained deputy prime minister in the subsequent SNS–SPS government. In the 2014 election, PUPS again ran with SPS and JS, and the coalition placed second with 13.94% of the vote and 44 seats.

=== Coalition with SNS (2016–present) ===
In 2016, the presidency of PUPS signed an agreement with SNS to join its pre-election coalition. The SNS-led list placed first with 49.71% of the vote and 131 seats, nine of which went to PUPS. Milan Krkobabić, who had succeeded his father as president of PUPS, then became a minister without portfolio. In 2020, PUPS again ran on the SNS-led list, which won 63.02% of the vote and 188 seats, while PUPS kept its nine seats. Krkobabić was then appointed minister for rural welfare, a post he retained in the cabinet of Đuro Macut formed in April 2025.

In June 2022, the party adopted its current name, PUPS – Solidarity and Justice. It won six seats on the SNS-led lists in both the 2022 and 2023 parliamentary elections. On 8 June 2026, Milan Krkobabić was re-elected president of PUPS; at the session, Aleksandar Vučić said that he expected the two parties to run together in future elections. PUPS took part in the 2026 snap parliamentary election on the SNS-led "Aleksandar Vučić – United Serbia" list, on which Stefan Krkobabić was 31st. The list won 1,731,323 votes (39.48%) and 103 seats, losing the election to the Student List. Three PUPS members were elected: Stefan Krkobabić, Risto Kostov and Dragan M. Marković, all of whom had been members of the party's parliamentary group in the previous convocation. Their mandates were confirmed on 17 November 2026, and they joined the "Aleksandar Vučić – Serbia is Winning" parliamentary group in the 15th National Assembly.

== Ideology and platform ==
PUPS advocates for pensioners' interests while also supporting socially conservative views.

== List of presidents ==
#	President	Birth–Death	Term start	Term end
1	Jovan Krkobabić	1930–2014	10 May 2005	22 April 2014
2	Milan Krkobabić	1952–	28 June 2014	Incumbent

== Electoral performance ==
=== Parliamentary elections ===
National Assembly
Year	Leader	Popular vote	% of popular vote	#	# of seats	Seat change	Coalition	Status	Ref.
2007	Jovan Krkobabić	125,342	3.16%	▲8th	0 / 250	0	PUPS–SDP–SNP	Extra-parliamentary	
2008	Jovan Krkobabić	313,896	7.75%	▲4th	5 / 250	▲5	SPS–PUPS–JS	Government	
2012	Jovan Krkobabić	567,689	15.18%	▲3rd	12 / 250	▲7	SPS–PUPS–JS	Government	
2014	Jovan Krkobabić	484,607	13.94%	▲2nd	12 / 250	0	SPS–PUPS–JS	Support	
2016	Milan Krkobabić	1,823,147	49.71%	▲1st	9 / 250	▼3	AV–SP	Government	
2020	Milan Krkobabić	1,953,998	63.02%	1st	9 / 250	0	AV–ZND	Government	
2022	Milan Krkobabić	1,635,101	44.27%	1st	6 / 250	▼3	AV–ZMS	Government	
2023	Milan Krkobabić	1,783,701	48.07%	1st	6 / 250	0	AV–SNSDS	Government	
2026	Milan Krkobabić	1,731,323	39.48%	▼2nd	3 / 250	▼3	AV–US	Opposition	

View source data.

=== Presidential elections ===
President of Serbia
Year	Candidate	1st round popular vote		% of popular vote	2nd round popular vote		% of popular vote	Notes	Ref.
2008	Milutin Mrkonjić	4th	245,889	6.09%	—N/a	—	—	Supported Mrkonjić	
2012	Ivica Dačić	3rd	556,013	14.89%	—N/a	—	—	Supported Dačić	
2017	Aleksandar Vučić	1st	2,012,788	56.01%	—N/a	—	—	Supported Vučić	
2022	Aleksandar Vučić	1st	2,224,914	60.01%	—N/a	—	—	Supported Vučić	
