= United Serbia =

Political party in Serbia

United Serbia Јединствена Србија
- Abbreviation: JS
- President: Dalibor Marković
- Parliamentary leader: Vacant
- Founder: Dragan Marković
- Founded: 15 February 2004; 22 years ago
- Split from: Party of Serbian Unity
- Headquarters: Železnička 2, Jagodina
- Youth wing: Youth of United Serbia
- Women's wing: Aktiv žena
- Ideology: National conservatism; Populism; Regionalism
- Political position: Right-wing
- National affiliation: Factor of Stability
- Parliamentary group: United Serbia
- Colours: Red; Blue; White
- National Assembly: 0 / 250
- Assembly of Vojvodina: 2 / 120
- City Assembly of Belgrade: 1 / 110

Website
- jedinstvenasrbija.org.rs

United Serbia (Serbian: Јединствена Србија, romanised: Jedinstvena Srbija, abbr. JS) is a national-conservative political party in Serbia. It split from the Party of Serbian Unity in 2004. The party has supported every government formed since its creation, and was briefly in government in 2022–23.

== History ==
It was founded on 15 February 2004, as a split from the far-right Party of Serbian Unity with Dragan Marković Palma elected as the leader on the first party assembly. During its early years, the party had close relations with other right-wing parties such as New Serbia and Democratic Party of Serbia, even participating with them in the 2007 parliamentary election.

During the 2008 parliamentary election, they participated in a coalition around the Socialist Party of Serbia and supported the accession of Serbia into the European Union. After the election, United Serbia was the first to announce the beginning of talks with the coalition For a European Serbia, led by the President Boris Tadić, on forming the new government.

The United Serbia, including its leader Palma, supported the "Serbs for Trump" campaign and Donald Trump in the 2020 United States presidential election.

== Ideology and platform ==
JS is positioned on the right of the political spectrum. It has been described as national-conservative and populist. It is staunchly socially conservative and it also advocates regionalism.

== Organisation ==
The party leader was Dragan Marković, former mayor of Jagodina, until his death in November 2024. He was succeeded by his son Dalibor.

In 2012, JS had 82,000 members.

== Electoral performance ==
=== Parliamentary elections ===
National Assembly of Serbia
Year	Leader	Popular vote	% of popular vote	#	# of seats	Seat change	Coalition	Status
2007	Dragan Marković	667,615	16.83%	▲3rd	2 / 250	▲2	JS–DSS–NS	Support
2008	Dragan Marković	313,896	7.75%	▼4th	3 / 250	▲1	JS–SPS–PUPS	Support
2012	Dragan Marković	567,689	15.18%	▲3rd	7 / 250	▲4	JS–SPS–PUPS	Support
2014	Dragan Marković	484,607	13.94%	▲2nd	7 / 250	0	JS–SPS–PUPS	Support
2016	Dragan Marković	413,770	11.28%	2nd	6 / 250	▼1	JS–SPS–Zeleni–KP	Support
2020	Dragan Marković	334,333	10.78%	2nd	8 / 250	▲2	JS–SPS–Zeleni–KP	Support
2022	Dragan Marković	435,274	11.79%	▼3rd	8 / 250	0	JS–SPS–Zeleni	Government (2022–23)
2022	Dragan Marković	435,274	11.79%	▼3rd	8 / 250	0	JS–SPS–Zeleni	Support (2023)
2023	Dragan Marković	249,916	6.73%	3rd	5 / 250	▼3	JS–SPS–Zeleni	Support
2026	Dalibor Marković	94,766	2.16%	3rd	0 / 250	▼5	JS–SPS–Zeleni–SDPS	Extra-parliamentary

=== Presidential elections ===
President of Serbia
Year	Candidate	1st round popular vote		% of popular vote	2nd round popular vote		% of popular vote	Notes
2004	Ljiljana Aranđelović	11th	11,796	0.38%	—N/a	—	—	
2008	Velimir Ilić	3rd	305,828	7.57%	—N/a	—	—	Supported Ilić
2012	Ivica Dačić	3rd	556,013	14.89%	—N/a	—	—	Supported Dačić
2017	Aleksandar Vučić	1st	2,012,788	56.01%	—N/a	—	—	Supported Vučić
2022	Aleksandar Vučić	1st	2,224,914	60.01%	—N/a	—	—	Supported Vučić
