= Socialist Party of Serbia =

Political party in Serbia

Socialist Party of Serbia Социјалистичка партија Србије
- Abbreviation: SPS
- President: Ivica Dačić
- Vice-Presidents: Aleksandar Antić; Dušan Bajatović; Novica Tončev; Predrag J. Marković; Đorđe Milićević; Žarko Obradović
- Founder: Slobodan Milošević
- Founded: 17 July 1990; 36 years ago
- Merger of: SKS; SSRNJ
- Headquarters: Bulevar Mihajla Pupina 6, Belgrade
- Youth wing: Socialist Youth
- Women's wing: Women's Forum
- Ideology: Social democracy; Populism
- Political position: Centre-left (Note: Some analysts argue that SPS is left-leaning only nominally; in 2026, political analyst Zoran Lutovac described it as "a populist party completely fused with the Serbian Progressive Party".)
- National affiliation: Factor of Stability
- Colours: Red
- National Assembly: 0 / 250
- Assembly of Vojvodina: 8 / 120
- City Assembly of Belgrade: 7 / 110

Party flag

Website
- sps.org.rs

The Socialist Party of Serbia (Serbian: Социјалистичка партија Србије, romanised: Socijalistička partija Srbije, abbr. SPS) is a social democratic and populist political party in Serbia. Ivica Dačić, a former prime minister of Serbia, has led the party since 2006.

SPS was founded in 1990 as a merger of the League of Communists of Serbia and Socialist Alliance of Working People of Yugoslavia with Slobodan Milošević as its first president. In the 1990 general elections, SPS became the ruling party of Serbia while Milošević was elected president of Serbia. During Milošević's rule, SPS relied on the Serbian Radical Party (SRS) from 1992 to 1993 while it later led several coalition governments with SRS, New Democracy, and Yugoslav Left. Mass protests against SPS were held in 1991, and after being accused of falsifying votes in major urban cities, such as Belgrade and Niš, 1996–1997 protests were also organised. The Democratic Opposition of Serbia coalition defeated SPS in the 2000 general elections but Milošević declined to accept the results. This resulted in Milošević's overthrow.

SPS was in opposition until 2004, after which it provided confidence and supply to the government of Vojislav Koštunica until 2007. Dačić led SPS into a coalition government with the Democratic Party after the 2008 parliamentary election, while four years later he became the prime minister of Serbia after the formation of a coalition government with the Serbian Progressive Party (SNS). He remained prime minister until 2014, after which SPS served as a junior partner in SNS-led governments. Although it described itself as a democratic socialist party, SPS promoted mixed economy and populist nationalism under Milošević's leadership and was accused of authoritarianism. SPS has remained populist under Dačić but it shifted towards social democracy and a centre-left and more pragmatic, pro-European image. Since 2008, SPS has contested parliamentary elections at the head of an electoral alliance with United Serbia and other partners, which ran as the Factor of Stability in 2026, when the Social Democratic Party of Serbia joined it. Contesting the 2026 snap election independently of SNS, the alliance won 2.16% of the vote and failed to cross the electoral threshold, leaving SPS without seats in the National Assembly for the first time.

== History ==
=== Formation ===
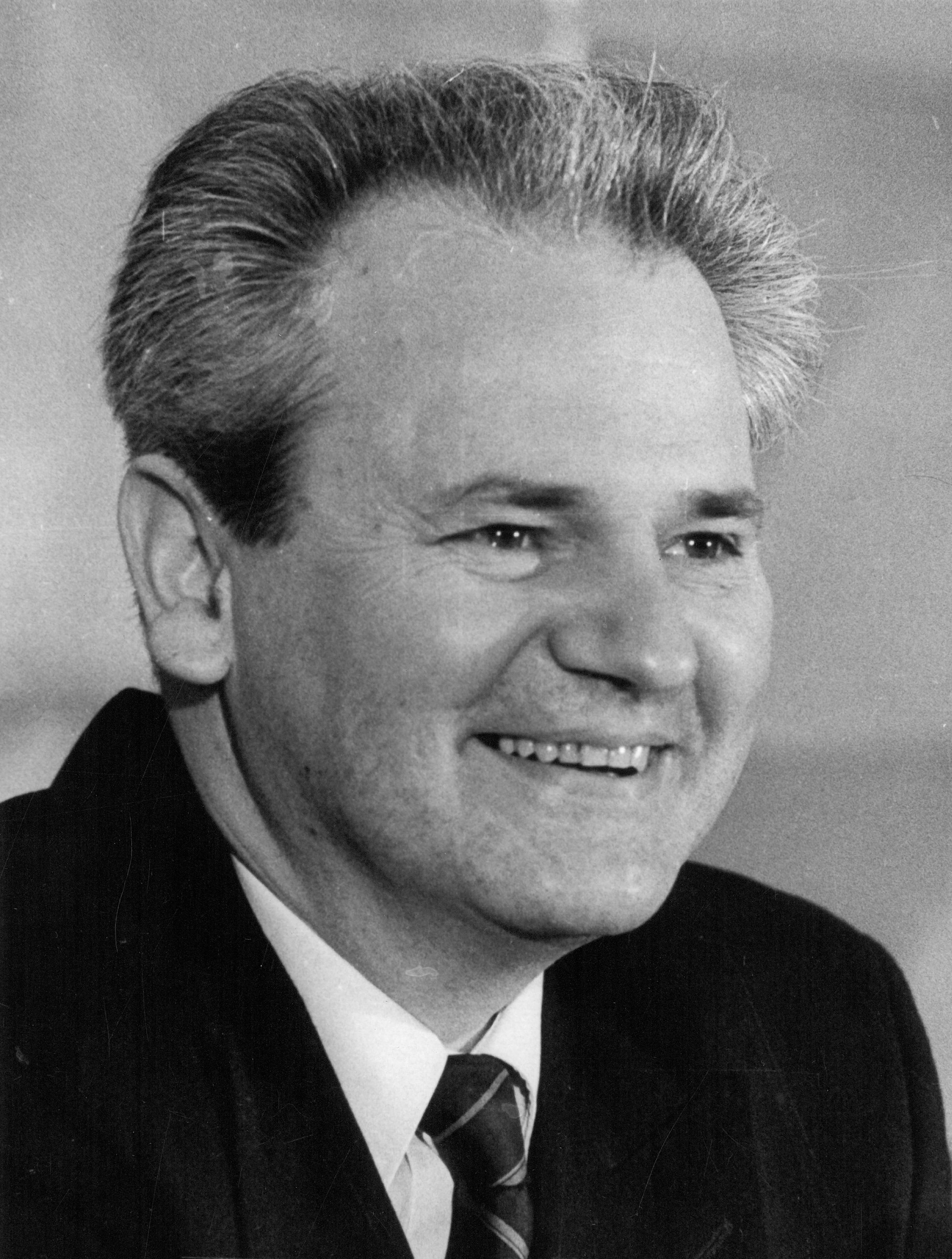
Slobodan Milošević was the founder of SPS and its leader from 1990 to 1991 and again from 1992 to 2006

After World War II, the Communist Party consolidated power in Yugoslavia. Each constituent republic had its own branch of the party, with Serbia having the Communist Party of Serbia, which was renamed the League of Communists of Serbia (SKS) in 1952. SKS elected Slobodan Milošević as its president in 1986, with the endorsement of the outgoing president, Ivan Stambolić. Milošević came to power by promising to reduce the autonomy of provinces of Kosovo and Vojvodina. At a congress that was held in January 1990, rifts between SKS and League of Communists of Slovenia occurred which ultimately led to the dissolution of the federal Communist Party. This also led to the establishment of multi-party systems in the constituent republics.

Milošević organised a congress on 17 July 1990, during which its delegates voted in favour of merging SKS and the Socialist Alliance of Working People of Yugoslavia (SSRNJ) to create the Socialist Party of Serbia (SPS). Milošević was elected as the party's president. According to political scientist Jerzy Wiatr, the merger "did not substantially change either the organisational structure of the party or its administration", although SPS did gain control of a large amount of infrastructure, including material and financial assets. Milošević as president of the SPS was able to wield considerable power and influence in the government and the public and private sectors, while members who showed independence from Milošević were expelled from the party.

=== 1990–1992: Early years ===
Flag of the Socialist Party of Serbia (1990–1992)

SPS took part in the general elections held in December 1990. The parliamentary election was conducted in a first-past-the-post system, where members were elected in 250 single-member constituency seats; this system strengthened the position of SPS. SPS won 194 of the 250 seats in the National Assembly, despite only winning 48% of the popular vote. Opposition parties, such as the Democratic Party (DS) and Serbian Renewal Movement (SPO), tried to challenge the legitimacy of the election, citing alleged abuse of postal voting and manipulation during vote counting. In the presidential election, Milošević won 65% of the popular vote in the first round of the election. By January 1991, sociologist Laslo Sekelj reported that SPS had 500,000 members. SPS was faced with protests in March 1991, while Milošević was succeeded by Borisav Jović as the president of SPS on 24 May 1991; he held the position until 24 October 1992, when Milošević returned as president of SPS, following the second party congress.

After the break-up of Yugoslavia, Serbia became a part of Federal Republic of Yugoslavia. With the opposition boycotting the May 1992 parliamentary election, claiming that conditions were not free and fair, SPS won 49% of the popular vote. Protests were held shortly after the election, after which snap elections were called for December 1992, in which SPS won 33% of the popular vote. Simultaneously with these elections, the 1992 general elections occurred in Serbia as a result of an early elections referendum that was organised in October 1992. The parliamentary election in 1992 was conducted under a proportional representation system, and in it SPS won 101 out of 250 seats in the National Assembly; because of that the SPS minority government had to rely on the far-right Serbian Radical Party (SRS), which had won 73 seats. In the presidential election, Milošević won 57% of the popular vote in the first round, while his opponent Milan Panić won 35% of the popular vote.

=== 1993–2000: Leading government party ===
After the announcement that SPS would abandon its hardline position regarding the Bosnian War and Croatian War of Independence in favour of a compromise and after a dispute regarding the rebalancing of the federal budget in July 1993, the coalition between SPS and SRS collapsed. SRS then unsuccessfully called a motion of no confidence against SPS in September 1993, after which Milošević dissolved the National Assembly and called a snap parliamentary election for December 1993. In the parliamentary election, SPS won 123 seats, three short of a majority. Milošević then persuaded the New Democracy (ND), which as part of the SPO-led Democratic Movement of Serbia coalition won 5 seats, to enter a coalition government with SPS. ND accepted this and the new government headed by Mirko Marjanović was sworn in in March 1994.

SPS soon formed the Left Coalition with ND and the Yugoslav Left (JUL), a far-left political party headed by Milošević's wife Mirjana Marković, to contest the parliamentary elections for the federal parliament in November 1996. The Left Coalition emerged with 64 out of 108 seats in the election. SPS was accused of falsifying votes in cities such as Belgrade and Niš in the 1996 local elections. The electoral commission invalidated the opposition's victories. This led to mass protests that were organised up until February 1997, when SPS ultimately accepted the defeat. Milošević, who was constitutionally limited to two terms as president of Serbia, was elected president of Federal Republic of Yugoslavia in July 1997, shortly before the general elections in Serbia. SPS took part with ND and JUL under the Left Coalition banner and won 110 seats in the National Assembly. ND declined to join the government, and the coalition broke up after SPS and JUL formed a government with SRS. In the presidential election, SPS nominated Zoran Lilić, but the election was annulled because turnout was below 50%. This led to another presidential election which was held in December 1997; Milan Milutinović, the SPS-nominated candidate, won in the second round of the election.

The new SPS-led government faced the Kosovo War, which had a major impact on SPS. SPO joined the SPS-led federal government in January 1999. Vuk Drašković, the leader of SPO, supported the proposed Rambouillet Agreement, though Milošević declined to sign it, which ultimately led to the NATO bombing of Yugoslavia. Additionally, SPS and SPO entered into a conflict after the assassination of journalist Slavko Ćuruvija, which led to SPO's dismissal from the federal government. In the same year, Milošević proposed constitutional changes to the federal parliament to allow him to run for another term in the 2000 election; the amendments were passed by the parliament. Otpor, a student resistance movement formed in October 1998, and the Democratic Opposition of Serbia (DOS), a wide alliance of opposition parties formed in January 2000, called for early elections, but the elections were held in September 2000. Milošević faced Vojislav Koštunica, the DOS-nominated candidate, in the presidential election. The Federal Election Committee reported that Koštunica had placed first but with less than 50% of the vote, which would have required a second round. Milošević refused to accept the results, which led to DOS-organised mass protests that culminated in the overthrow of Slobodan Milošević. Milošević accepted defeat on 5 October 2000, while the Federal Election Committee published actual results on 7 October. Shortly after the elections, SPS, SPO, and DOS agreed to organise a snap parliamentary election in Serbia in December 2000. This parliamentary election, and all subsequent ones, were conducted in a proportional electoral system with only one electoral unit. SPS was defeated, winning only 37 of the 250 seats in the National Assembly, which put the party in opposition for the first time since its formation in 1990. Following the 2000 elections, Milorad Vučelić formed the Democratic Socialist Party while Zoran Lilić also left and formed the Serbian Social Democratic Party.

=== 2001–2008: Opposition and support for Koštunica's government ===
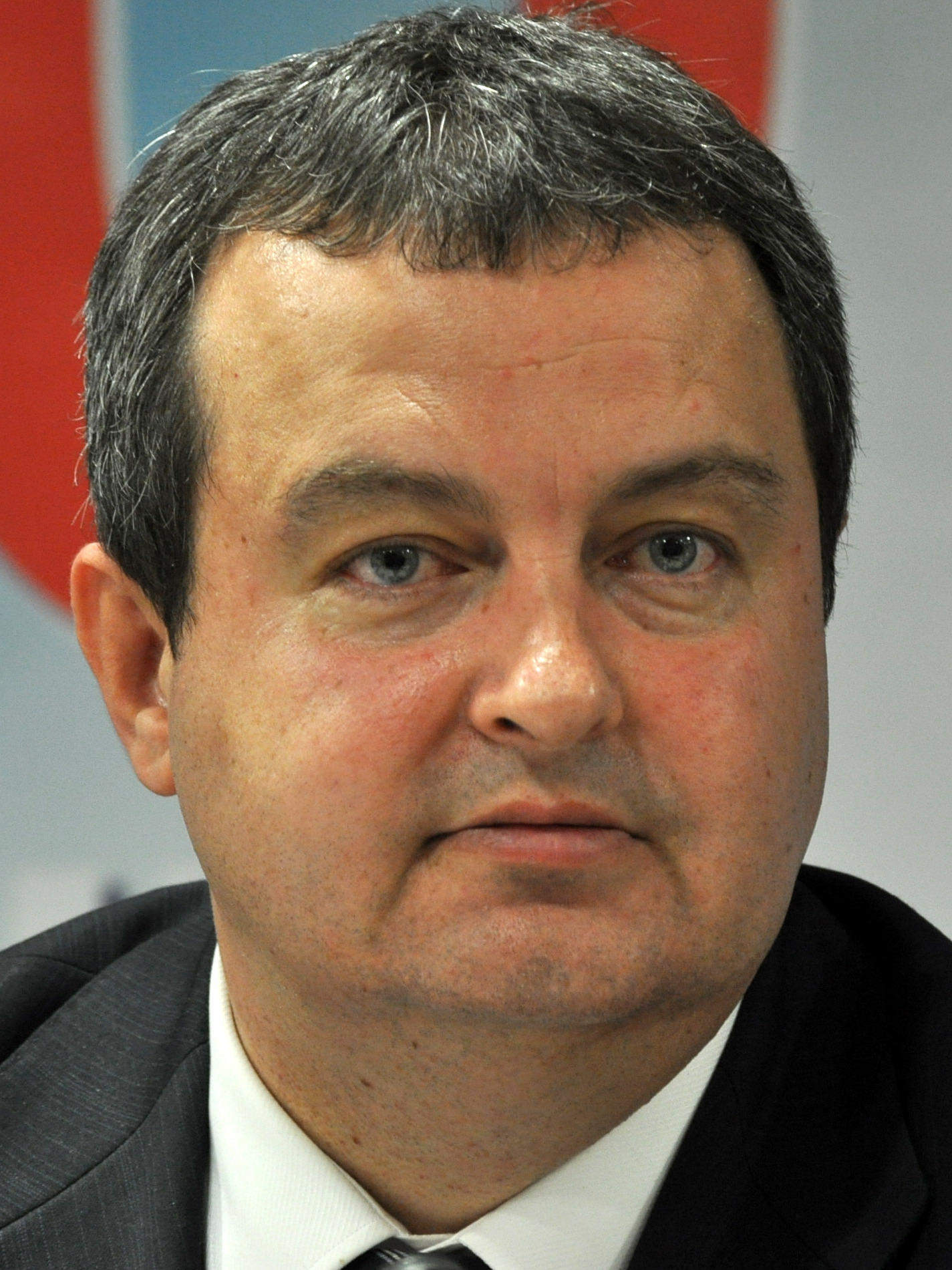
Ivica Dačić has been the leader of SPS since 2006

Milošević, who was still the president of SPS, was arrested in March 2001 on suspicion of corruption and abuse of power, and was shortly after extradited to the International Criminal Tribunal for the former Yugoslavia to stand trial for war crimes instead. At the presidential election in September 2002, SPS nominated actor Bata Živojinović; he placed sixth. The election was annulled because turnout in the second round was below 50%. This led to another presidential election which was held in December 2002; SPS supported Vojislav Šešelj, the leader of SRS. He placed second, and the election was again annulled because turnout was below 50%. At a party congress in January 2003, Ivica Dačić, a reformist within SPS, was elected president of the party's main board. It was reported that Milošević subsequently demanded his expulsion from the party, although Dačić denied this. SPS boycotted another presidential election held in November 2003. A month later, SPS took part in a snap parliamentary election in which it won 22 seats, as many of its voters shifted to SRS. SPS then provided confidence and supply to Koštunica's government in the National Assembly. In 2004, the 50% turnout rule for presidential elections was abolished, after which SPS nominated Dačić as their presidential candidate for the 2004 presidential election; he placed fifth.

After the death of Milošević in March 2006, a conflict between Dačić and Vučelić emerged regarding who would continue leading the party. At the party congress in December 2006, Dačić was officially elected president of SPS, after previously serving as the party's de facto leader since 2003. In the parliamentary election that was held in January 2007, SPS dropped to 16 seats in the National Assembly, after which SPS returned to opposition. A year later, SPS nominated Milutin Mrkonjić, the party's deputy president, as its candidate in the presidential election. Mrkonjić campaigned on social issues and issues regarding the economy, insisting that SPS was "the true party of the left" and that Serbia should join the European Union. He placed fourth, winning 6% of the popular vote. Shortly afterwards, SPS formed a coalition with United Serbia (JS) and Party of United Pensioners of Serbia (PUPS) which took part in the snap parliamentary election in May 2008. The coalition won 20 seats, 12 of which went to SPS alone. Initially, SPS negotiated with SRS, Democratic Party of Serbia, and New Serbia to form a government, but it abandoned those talks in favour of negotiations with the For a European Serbia coalition, which was led by DS. The DS–SPS coalition government was sworn in July 2008, with Dačić serving as first deputy prime minister while Slavica Đukić Dejanović became the president of the National Assembly.

=== 2009–2014: DS and SNS governments ===
Official logo of SPS until December 2014

While in government, SPS was faced with challenges regarding the 2008 Kosovo declaration of independence and the 2008 financial crisis, which led to low rates of economic growth. SPS also signed a reconciliation declaration with its government partner DS, although the two parties continued to clash. Protests organised in 2011 led Boris Tadić, the president of Serbia, to call snap elections for 2012. During the 2012 campaign period, SPS campaigned with JS and PUPS, with Dačić being their joint presidential candidate. He campaigned on workers' rights, free education, and ending neoliberalism, as well as rising wages and pensions, while SPS also campaigned on criticising post-Milošević governments. In the parliamentary election, the coalition led by SPS won 44 seats in the National Assembly, while SPS alone won 25. Dačić placed third in the presidential election, winning 15% of the popular vote. After the announcement that Tomislav Nikolić, the leader of the Serbian Progressive Party (SNS), had won the presidential election, Dačić abandoned the coalition with DS and instead sought to form a government with SNS. As a result, Dačić became prime minister of Serbia in July 2012.

As prime minister, Dačić worked on normalisation between Serbia and Kosovo, which was formalised under the Brussels Agreement in April 2013. His government was reshuffled at his initiative in September 2013, after which SPS and SNS continued to govern alone without the United Regions of Serbia. President Nikolić then called snap parliamentary elections to be held in March 2014. SPS took part in the election with JS and PUPS and campaigned on the protection of workers, peasants, and pensioners. They won 44 seats in the National Assembly, while their coalition partner, SNS, won 158 seats in total. SPS remained in government, although Dačić was succeeded as prime minister by Aleksandar Vučić, the leader of SNS. At a party congress in December 2014, SPS adopted its new logo.

=== 2015–2026: Junior partner of SNS ===
Throughout 2015, there was speculation about whether a snap parliamentary election would occur. This was confirmed in January 2016, when a parliamentary election was announced to be held in April 2016. Following the announcement, PUPS left the SPS-led coalition and joined the SNS-led one, while SPS and JS formalised a coalition with the Greens of Serbia (Zeleni). The SPS-led ballot list also included Joška Broz, the leader of the Communist Party and the grandson of Josip Broz Tito. This coalition won 29 seats in the National Assembly, 21 out of which were occupied by SPS. Following the election, SPS agreed to again serve as a junior member in the SNS-led coalition government, which was inaugurated in August 2016. SPS did not take part in the 2017 presidential election and instead it supported Vučić, who ended up winning 56% of the popular vote in the first round of the election. His election as president was followed by mass protests.

At the end of 2018, a series of anti-government protests began and they lasted until March 2020. During this period, the opposition Alliance for Serbia announced that it would boycott the 2020 parliamentary elections. The SPS-led coalition won 32 seats, despite receiving fewer votes than in 2016. SPS offered to continue its cooperation with the SNS-led coalition, which now had 188 out of 250 seats in the National Assembly. SPS remained in government with SNS after the election, while Dačić, who had been the first deputy prime minister of Serbia since 2014, became the president of the National Assembly in October 2020. Dačić presided over the dialogues to improve election conditions from May to October 2021. SPS affirmed its position to continue its support for SNS after these dialogues, while in January 2022, SPS announced that it would support Vučić in the 2022 presidential election. In the parliamentary election, SPS took part in a coalition with JS and Zeleni, while it campaigned on greater cooperation with China and Russia. It won 31 seats in total, 22 out of which went to SPS, while Vučić won 60% of the popular vote in the presidential election. SPS agreed to continue governing with SNS after the election, which led to Dačić being re-appointed as first deputy prime minister in October 2022.

After Vučić announced the formation of the People's Movement for the State in March 2023, Dačić said that it could bring "a new, even higher stage of cooperation between SNS and SPS". However, a faction opposed to joining the movement was formed inside SPS with members such as vice-president Predrag J. Marković, who said that "SPS would lose its identity if it joins the movement". Despite this, SPS again formed an electoral alliance with JS and Zeleni for the early 2023 parliamentary election. SPS suffered a defeat, winning only 12 seats within the SPS-led coalition. Dačić said he was willing to step aside for a new party president, but the main board of SPS expressed its support for Dačić to remain president of SPS and to continue the cooperation with SNS. In an unprecedented move, SPS formed a joint electoral list with SNS for the 2024 Belgrade City Assembly election. Their electoral list won 52 percent of the popular vote and 64 out of 110 seats in the City Assembly of Belgrade.

From November 2024, the SNS-led government, which includes SPS, faced the student-led anti-corruption protests. In April 2025, SPS became a junior partner in Đuro Macut's cabinet.

=== 2026–present: Factor of Stability ===
Ahead of the 2026 snap parliamentary election, Dačić announced in August 2026 that SPS would run independently of SNS and that it would field its own candidate in the next presidential election. On 31 August, the party's statutory commission unanimously expelled vice-president Branko Ružić, citing violations of the party statute and public statements contrary to party policy; SPS had suspended him in April 2025 after he took part in an anti-government protest, and it also objected to his remarks about cooperating with the student movement. SPS then signed a memorandum of cooperation with the Social Democratic Party of Serbia (SDPS), which analysts described as a way for both parties to cross the electoral threshold and as a step away from SNS. On 8 September, the SPS main board unanimously decided to contest the election in a coalition with JS, SDPS, and Zeleni. The coalition submitted its list, "Ivica Dačić – Factor of Stability!", on 12 September, and it was proclaimed by the Republic Electoral Commission two days later. In the election, held on 25 October, the list won 94,766 votes (2.16%) according to the final results announced by the Republic Electoral Commission on 5 November, and failed to cross the 3% electoral threshold, leaving SPS without seats in the National Assembly. Dačić said that SPS and its partners had not achieved their goal, describing the atmosphere as that of a referendum. At a meeting of the party's narrow leadership on 28 October, Dačić proposed postponing the regular party congress, due in December 2026, to February 2027; according to the Beta news agency, no party official had offered to resign over the result. Dačić responded the following day that all members of the leadership felt responsible and had offered their resignations, and that the decisions would be taken by the main board after consultations with the local boards and a session of the presidency.

In October 2026, Ružić announced that he would found a new party, and Ivan Đoković, a former vice-president of the SPS provincial board in Vojvodina, left SPS to join him, calling Ružić's expulsion "the straw that broke the camel's back". On 9 November, Ružić launched an initiative to found Red Line – Social Democrats, a social democratic and pro-European party.

== Ideology and platform ==
=== Milošević era ===
SPS adopted its first political programme in October 1990, which had the intention to develop "Serbia as a socialist republic, founded on law and social justice". The party made economic reforms outside of Marxist ideology such as recognising all forms of property and intended a progression to a market economy while at the same time advocating some regulation for the purposes of "solidarity, equality, and social security". While in power, SPS enacted policies that were negative towards workers' rights, while beginning in 1992, SPS moved its support towards a mixed economy with both public and private sectors. SPS maintained connections with trade unions, although independent trade unions faced hostility and their activities were brutalised by the police. During Milošević's era, SPS was positioned on the left-wing on the political spectrum, and was associated with anti-liberalism. SPS declared itself to be a "democratic socialist party" and "the follower of the ideas of Svetozar Marković, Dimitrije Tucović, and the Serbian Social Democratic Party". Political scientists Heinz Timmermann and Luke March, and Marko Stojić of Metropolitan University Prague, associated SPS during Milošević's era with nationalist form of populism. Political scientist Jean-Pierre Cabestan noted that SPS thrived on the growth of nationalism, but was not nationalist itself, and instead associated SPS with communism. Mirjana Prošić-Dvornić, an ethnologist, noted that SPS "usurped the nationalist rhetoric of opposition parties". Janusz Bugajski, a political scientist, described SPS as nationalist, but also noted that it never identified as such. Warren Zimmermann, the last United States ambassador to Yugoslavia, argued that Milošević was "not a genuine nationalist but an opportunist".

SPS nominally endorsed the principle of full equality of all the Yugoslav peoples and ethnic minorities, while it was also supportive of Yugoslavism. Up until 1993, it supported Serbs in Bosnia and Herzegovina, and Croatia who wished to remain in Yugoslavia. As Croatia and Bosnia and Herzegovina declared independence, the involvement by SPS as a ruling party had become more devoted to helping external Serbs run their own independent entities. Milošević denied that the government of Serbia helped Serb military forces in Bosnia and Herzegovina, instead stating that they had the right to self-determination; Jović stated in a 1995 BBC documentary that Milošević endorsed the transfer of Bosnian Serb federal army forces to the Bosnian Serb Army in 1992 to help achieve Serb independence from Bosnia and Herzegovina. Though shortly before the Dayton Agreement in 1995, SPS began to oppose the government of Republika Srpska, which was headed by Radovan Karadžić. The opposition accused SPS of authoritarianism, as well as personal profiteering from illegal business transactions in the arms trade, cigarettes and oil; this illegal business was caused by the UN sanctions, and none of accusations for personal profiteering were ever proven at the court. Political scientists Nebojša Vladisavljević, Karmen Erjavec, and Florian Bieber also described Milošević's rule as authoritarian. Independent media during the SPS administration received threats and high fines.

=== Dačić era ===
After Dačić came to power, SPS shifted towards democratic socialism, and then to social democracy in the 2010s. Although SPS is still affiliated and has promoted populist rhetoric, its nationalist image has softened. It is now positioned on the centre-left on the political spectrum. Prior to mid-2000s, SPS was Eurosceptic and it also promoted anti-globalist and anti-Western sentiment. It also promoted anti-imperialist criticism towards the European Union and NATO. Since then, SPS has supported the accession of Serbia to the European Union, and a more pro-European image after it came back to government in 2008, which scholars Nataša Jovanović Ajzenhamer and Haris Dajč described as rather pragmatic. SPS has also been described as pro-Russian. Critics argue that the party has abandoned its left-wing identity; in 2026, political analyst Zoran Lutovac described SPS as "a populist party completely fused with SNS", while Bojan Vranić of the Faculty of Political Sciences argued that it protects "capitalist instead of workers' interests". SPS officials rejected this and maintained that the party remains on the left.

=== Demographic characteristics ===
Before the federal parliamentary election in December 1992, the Institute of Social Studies polled that a majority of SPS supporters preferred a citizen state over a nation state. According to political scientist Dragomir Pantić, supporters of SPS in the early 2000s were mostly elderly people, traditionalists, and those without higher education. In comparison with its demographic from the 1990s, the percentage of workers and farmers increased amongst its base in the 2000s. According to a CeSID opinion poll from 2005, SPS supporters consisted of unskilled and semi-skilled workers.

In 2007, political scientist Srećko Mihailović noted that most of the SPS supporters saw themselves on the far-left, that 19 percent of them saw themselves on the left-wing, while 8 percent only saw themselves as centre-left. According to CeSID in 2008, a majority of supporters of the SPS–PUPS–JS coalition were Eurosceptics. In 2014, CeSID and National Democratic Institute polled that 59 percent of SPS supporters were women and that 58 percent of all SPS supporters were 50 years old or older. However, by 2016 a majority of the supporters were over 60 years old. The Heinrich Böll Foundation conducted research in November 2020 in which most SPS supporters were against the accession of Serbia to the European Union, preferred closer relations with Russia instead, and wanted to implement laws to preserve patriarchal family values.

== Organisation ==
The president of SPS is Dačić, who was most recently re-elected in December 2022, while its vice-presidents are Aleksandar Antić, Dušan Bajatović, Novica Tončev, Predrag J. Marković, Đorđe Milićević, and Žarko Obradović; Branko Ružić was a vice-president until his expulsion in August 2026. Slavica Đukić Dejanović previously served as vice-president until July 2024, when she became an honorary president of the party. Snežana Paunović led its parliamentary group in the 14th National Assembly, which was dissolved ahead of the 2026 election. The headquarters of SPS is located at Bulevar Mihajla Pupina 6 in Belgrade. It has a youth wing named Socialist Youth and a women's wing named Women's Forum.

Its membership from its foundation in 1990 to 1997 involved many elements of the social strata of Serbia, including state administrators and business management elites of state-owned enterprises, employees in the state-owned sector, less privileged groups of farmers, and the unemployed and pensioners. From 1998 to 2000, its membership included apparatchiks at administrative and judicial levels, the nouveau riche, whose business success was founded solely from their affiliation with the government, and top army and police officials and a large majority of the police force. In 2011, SPS reported having 120,000 members, and in 2014 around 200,000. It reported 65,000 members in 2015. In 2016, it was reported that SPS had 195,000 members.

=== International cooperation ===
SPS cooperated with Momir Bulatović in Montenegro and the parties he led, while in Bosnia and Herzegovina SPS used to cooperate with Karadžić's Serb Democratic Party and with the Socialist Party. SPS cooperates with Syriza, a political party in Greece, having previously cooperated with PASOK. Following the 2008 elections, SPS sent an application to join the Socialist International while Dačić also met with its then-president George Papandreou. However, the Social Democratic Party of Bosnia and Herzegovina opposed this move and called for its application to be declined, while Jelko Kacin, a Liberal Democracy of Slovenia politician, claimed that Tadić blocked SPS from joining the Socialist International. Its candidature has not yet been accepted, although SPS also seeks associate member status in the Party of European Socialists. In the Parliamentary Assembly of the Council of Europe, SPS is represented by Dunja Simonović Bratić, who sits in the Socialists, Democrats and Greens Group.

=== List of presidents ===
#	President		Birth–Death	Term start	Term end
1	Slobodan Milošević	A photo of Slobodan Milošević in 2001	1941–2006	17 July 1990	24 May 1991
2	Borisav Jović	A photo of Borisav Jović in 2009	1928–2021	24 May 1991	24 October 1992
3	Slobodan Milošević	A photo of Slobodan Milošević in 2001	1941–2006	24 October 1992	11 March 2006
4	Ivica Dačić	A photo of Ivica Dačić in 2023	1966–	11 March 2006	Incumbent

== Electoral performance ==
=== Parliamentary elections ===
National Assembly of Serbia
Year	Leader	Popular vote	% of popular vote	#	# of seats	Seat change	Coalition	Status	Ref.
1990	Slobodan Milošević	2,320,587	48.15%	▲1st	194 / 250	▲194	–	Government	
1992	Slobodan Milošević	1,359,086	30.62%	1st	101 / 250	▼93	–	Government	
1993	Slobodan Milošević	1,576,287	38.21%	1st	123 / 250	▲22	–	Government	
1997	Slobodan Milošević	1,418,036	35.70%	1st	85 / 250	▼38	Left Coalition	Government	
2000	Slobodan Milošević	516,326	14.10%	▼2nd	37 / 250	▼48	–	Opposition	
2003	Ivica Dačić	291,341	7.72%	▼6th	22 / 250	▼15	–	Support	
2007	Ivica Dačić	227,580	5.74%	▲5th	16 / 250	▼6	–	Opposition	
2008	Ivica Dačić	313,896	7.75%	▲4th	12 / 250	▼4	SPS–PUPS–JS	Government	
2012	Ivica Dačić	567,689	15.18%	▲3rd	25 / 250	▲13	SPS–PUPS–JS	Government	
2014	Ivica Dačić	484,607	13.94%	▲2nd	25 / 250	0	SPS–PUPS–JS	Government	
2016	Ivica Dačić	413,770	11.28%	2nd	21 / 250	▼4	SPS–JS–KP–Zeleni	Government	
2020	Ivica Dačić	334,333	10.78%	2nd	22 / 250	▲1	SPS–JS–KP–Zeleni	Government	
2022	Ivica Dačić	435,274	11.79%	▼3rd	22 / 250	0	SPS–JS–Zeleni	Government	
2023	Ivica Dačić	249,916	6.73%	3rd	12 / 250	▼10	SPS–JS–Zeleni	Government	
2026	Ivica Dačić	94,766	2.16%	3rd	0 / 250	▼12	SPS–JS–SDPS–Zeleni	Extra-parliamentary	

View source data.

=== Presidential elections ===
President of Serbia
Year	Candidate	1st round popular vote		% of popular vote	2nd round popular vote		% of popular vote	Notes	Ref.
1990	Slobodan Milošević	1st	3,285,799	67.71%	—N/a	—	—		
1992	Slobodan Milošević	1st	2,515,047	57.46%	—N/a	—	—		
Sep 1997	Zoran Lilić	1st	1,474,924	37.12%	2nd	1,691,354	49.38%	Election annulled due to low turnout	
Dec 1997	Milan Milutinović	1st	1,665,822	44.62%	1st	2,181,808	61.19%		
Sep–Oct 2002	Bata Živojinović	6th	119,052	3.34%	—N/a	—	—	Election annulled due to low turnout	
Dec 2002	Vojislav Šešelj	2nd	1,063,296	37.10%	—N/a	—	—	Supported Šešelj; election annulled due to low turnout	
2003	Election boycott							Election annulled due to low turnout	
2004	Ivica Dačić	5th	125,952	4.09%	—N/a	—	—		
2008	Milutin Mrkonjić	4th	245,889	6.09%	—N/a	—	—		
2012	Ivica Dačić	3rd	556,013	14.89%	—N/a	—	—		
2017	Aleksandar Vučić	1st	2,012,788	56.01%	—N/a	—	—	Supported Vučić	
2022	Aleksandar Vučić	1st	2,224,914	60.01%	—N/a	—	—	Supported Vučić	

View source data.

=== Federal parliamentary elections ===
Year	Leader	Popular vote	% of popular vote	#	# of seats	Seat change	Coalition	Status	Notes	Ref.
May 1992	Slobodan Milošević	1,655,485	49.05%	▲1st	73 / 136	▲73	–	Government		
1992–1993	Slobodan Milošević	1,478,918	33.34%	1st	47 / 138	▼26	–	Government		
1996	Slobodan Milošević	1,848,669	45.34%	1st	52 / 138	▲5	Left Coalition	Government		
2000	Slobodan Milošević	1,532,841	33.95%	▼2nd	44 / 138	▼8	–	Opposition	Chamber of Citizens election	
2000	Slobodan Milošević	1,479,583	32.68%	▲2nd	7 / 40	▲7	–	Opposition	Chamber of Republics election	

=== Federal presidential elections ===
President of FR Yugoslavia
Year	Candidate	1st round popular vote		% of popular vote	2nd round popular vote		% of popular vote	Ref.
2000	Slobodan Milošević	2nd	1,826,799	38.24%	—N/a	—	—	
