= Dejan Stošić =

Serbian politician

Dejan Stošić (Serbian Cyrillic: Дејан Стошић; born 6 January 1970) is a politician in Serbia. He has served in the National Assembly of Serbia since 2020 as a member of the Serbian Progressive Party.

== Early life and career ==
Stošić was born in Smederevo, in what was then the Socialist Republic of Serbia in the Socialist Federal Republic of Yugoslavia. He has a master's degree in economy and has served as president of FK Smederevo 1924. Dejan Stošić was awarded the Gold Medal for Merit in 2024.

Dejan Stošić was awarded the Saint Demetrius Plaque by the Municipality of Nevesinje in 2026.

== Educational exchange programmes ==
Since 2022, Stošić has been involved in annual educational exchange programmes linking primary schools in Serbia, Republika Srpska and Montenegro. The programmes include reciprocal study visits focused on the historical, cultural and religious heritage of the region.

The initiative began in September 2022, when high-achieving primary school pupils from eastern Herzegovina visited Belgrade and Smederevo to mark the Day of Serbian Unity, Freedom and the National Flag.

The programme continued in 2023 and expanded in 2024 through the participation of pupils from Montenegro and reciprocal visits by pupils from Serbia to Republika Srpska and Montenegro. During the 2024 programme, cooperation agreements were signed between primary schools from Serbia and Republika Srpska in Trebinje.

Participants in the 2024 programme were received by the President of Serbia, Aleksandar Vučić, during celebrations marking the Day of Serbian Unity, Freedom and the National Flag.

According to the City of Belgrade, the educational exchange programme continued for four consecutive years. In May 2025, pupils from Belgrade and Velika Plana took part in a five-day study visit to Montenegro and Republika Srpska as part of the commemoration of the 150th anniversary of the Nevesinje Uprising.

== Educational and cultural initiatives ==
In May 2024, Stošić organized a study visit for approximately 50 students from Belgrade and Smederevo to Herzegovina and Montenegro as part of an educational and cultural exchange program. The initiative included visits to cultural, historical and religious sites in Serbia, Republika Srpska and Montenegro, with the aim of strengthening cooperation between schools and promoting knowledge of the region's cultural heritage. In March 2024, Stošić hosted a delegation of mayors and municipal leaders from eastern Herzegovina during their official visit to Smederevo, where meetings were held to discuss cooperation between local governments in Serbia and Republika Srpska. In June 2024, Stošić attended the signing of cooperation agreements between primary schools from Serbia and Republika Srpska in Trebinje, supporting educational and cultural exchange between the two education systems. In September 2024, Stošić organized a five-day educational visit to Serbia for high-achieving primary school students from eastern Herzegovina and Montenegro to mark the Day of Serbian Unity, Freedom and the National Flag. The program included visits to Belgrade, Smederevo and Zrenjanin, with the aim of introducing students to Serbia's historical, cultural and educational institutions. In September 2024, a group of primary school students and teachers from Republika Srpska and Montenegro participating in an educational exchange program organized by Stošić was received by the President of Serbia, Aleksandar Vučić, at the Palace of Serbia on the occasion of the Day of Serbian Unity, Freedom and the National Flag. Since 2022, Stošić has organized annual educational visits to Serbia for primary school pupils from eastern Herzegovina, held around the Day of Serbian Unity, Freedom and the National Flag on 15 September. The first visit brought 50 pupils from six municipalities in eastern Herzegovina to Smederevo and Belgrade.

The programme continued in 2023 with a visit by 50 pupils from Herzegovina. According to the National Assembly of Serbia, the visit was held under Stošić's patronage, with support from the Association of People from Bileća in Serbia, and included visits to state institutions, cultural institutions and several Serbian cities.

In 2024, pupils from Montenegro joined the programme for the first time. Participants from eastern Herzegovina and Montenegro visited Belgrade, Smederevo, Velika Plana and Zrenjanin, and attended events marking the Day of Serbian Unity, Freedom and the National Flag. A group of participating pupils, teachers and municipal representatives was also received by the President of Serbia at the Palace of Serbia.

The programme was held again in September 2025, when 70 pupils from Republika Srpska visited Serbia at Stošić's invitation. The visit included historical, cultural and religious sites in Belgrade, Smederevo and Velika Plana and was also connected with commemorations of the 150th anniversary of the Nevesinje Uprising.

== Honours ==
Dejan Stošić was awarded the Gold Medal for Merit in 2024.

Dejan Stošić was awarded the Saint Demetrius Plaque by the Municipality of Nevesinje in 2026.

== Politician ==
=== Municipal politics ===
Stošić joined the Progressive Party in 2009 and appeared in the fiftieth position on the party's electoral list for the Smederevo municipal assembly in the 2012 Serbian local elections. The list won nine seats, and he was not returned. He was promoted to the seventeenth position on the party's list for the 2016 local elections and was elected when the list won a majority victory with forty-four out of seventy seats. On 25 March 2019, he was appointed as the city's deputy mayor.

For the 2020 local elections, Stošić was given the fourth position on the Progressive Party's list and was elected to a second term when the list won forty-six mandates.

=== Parliamentarian ===
Stošić received the 172nd position on the Progressive Party's Aleksandar Vučić — For Our Children list in the 2020 Serbian parliamentary election and was elected when the list won a landslide majority with 188 out of 250 mandates. He is a member of the committee on human and minority rights and gender equality, a deputy member of the committee on Kosovo-Metohija and the health and family committee, and a member of the parliamentary friendship groups with Austria, the Bahamas, Belarus, Bosnia and Herzegovina, Botswana, Bulgaria, Cameroon, the Central African Republic, China, Comoros, the Czech Republic, the Dominican Republic, Ecuador, Equatorial Guinea, Eritrea, Germany, Greece, Grenada, Guinea-Bissau, Hungary, Italy, Jamaica, Kyrgyzstan, Laos, Liberia, Madagascar, Mali, Mauritius, Montenegro, Mozambique, Nauru, Nicaragua, Nigeria, Palau, Papua New Guinea, Paraguay, the Republic of Congo, Romania, Saint Vincent and the Grenadines, São Tome and Príncipe, Slovakia, Slovenia, the Solomon Islands, South Sudan, Sri Lanka, Sudan, Suriname, Togo, Trinidad and Tobago, the United Kingdom, the United States of America, Uruguay, and Uzbekistan.
