= 2020 Serbian local elections =

- 21 June 2020

Local elections were held in most cities and municipalities of Serbia (excluding the disputed territory of Kosovo) on 21 June 2020, with repeat voting later taking place in some communities. The elections were held concurrently with the 2020 Serbian parliamentary election and the 2020 Vojvodina provincial election. Elections on all three levels were initially scheduled for 26 April 2020 but were rescheduled due to the COVID-19 pandemic in the country.

As with the republic and provincial elections, the local elections were boycotted by several opposition parties, most notably those in the Alliance for Serbia, which charged that the process was neither free nor fair. Some parties that boycotted the parliamentary election nonetheless chose to participate in the local elections in a limited capacity.

Elections were not held for the City Assembly of Belgrade, as its members were elected on a different four-year cycle (although assembly elections were held in all of the City of Belgrade's constituent municipalities). Some other jurisdictions also did not hold local elections in 2020, for the same reason.

All local elections in Serbia are held under proportional representation. Mayors are not directly elected but are instead chosen by elected members of the local assemblies. For this election, the electoral threshold was lowered from five to three per cent (of all votes, not only of valid votes). Parties representing national minority communities are exempt from the threshold requirement.

== Outcome ==
As expected, the results were a victory for the Serbian Progressive Party's coalition, which finished first in most cities and municipalities, often with more than fifty per cent of the vote.

Parties representing the Hungarian, Bosniak, and Albanian national minority communities won the elections in some jurisdictions. The predominantly Serb municipalities where the SNS coalition did not win in 2020 included:

- Beočin, where the Socialist Party of Serbia won a narrow majority victory. After a political re-alignment in mid-2022, a new coalition government was formed that included the Progressives and the Socialists.
- Čajetina, where Healthy Serbia leader Milan Stamatović led his coalition to a majority victory. In late 2023, Healthy Serbia formed an alliance with the Progressives at the republic level.
- New Belgrade, where Serbian Patriotic Alliance leader and incumbent mayor Aleksandar Šapić led his party to a narrow victory over the Progressive Party's alliance and was afterward confirmed for a third term in office. Šapić's party later joined the coalition government led by the Progressives at the republic level. In 2021, the Serbian Patriotic Alliance merged into the Progressive Party.
- Ražanj, where an independent list led by incumbent mayor Dobrica Stojković won a plurality victory. Stojković and his entire assembly group joined the Progressives in November 2021.
- Svilajnac, where incumbent mayor Predrag Milanović led an independent list to victory and was confirmed afterward for another term in office.
- Topola, where Better Serbia leader Dragan Jovanović led his party to a narrow victory over the Progressive Party's alliance. The Progressives initially formed a coalition government with smaller parties, although the defection of some Progressive delegates in April 2021 led to a new coalition dominated by Better Serbia. In April 2023, Better Serbia merged into the Progressive Party.

== Results ==
=== Belgrade ===
Local elections were held in all seventeen of Belgrade's municipalities. The Serbian Progressive Party and its allies won in every jurisdiction except New Belgrade, where Aleksandar Šapić's Serbian Patriotic Alliance won a narrow victory. The only other municipality where the Progressive Party and its allies did not win an outright majority was Stari Grad, where they fell two seats short.

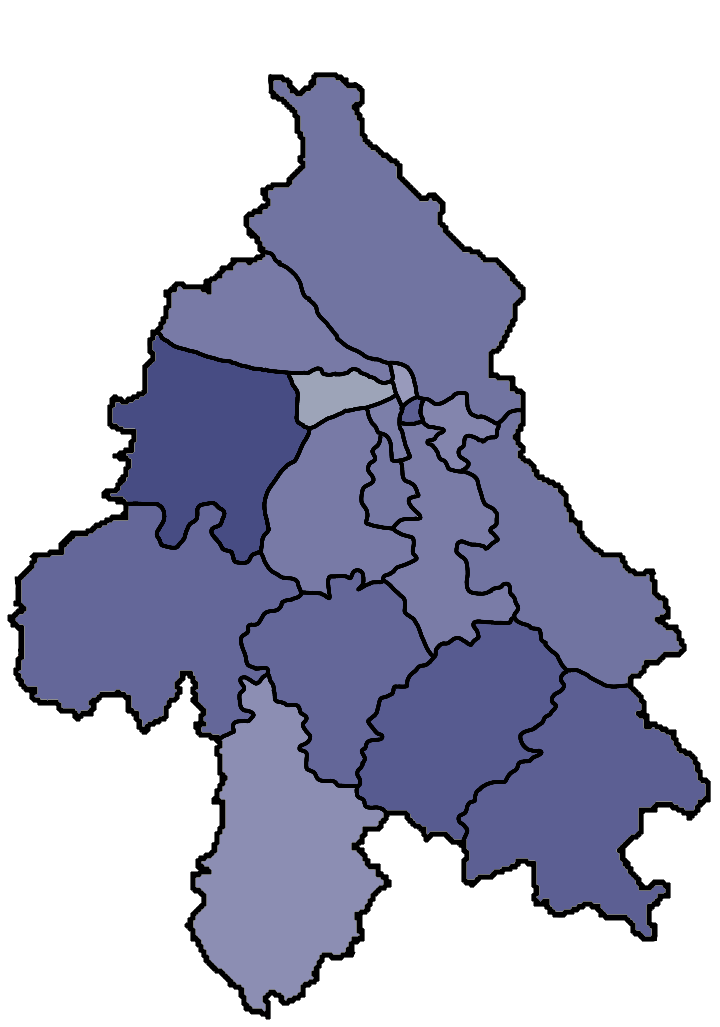
Results of 2020 Serbian local elections in Belgrade by municipality. Darker shade means stronger vote share.

==== Barajevo ====
Results of the election for the Municipal Assembly of Barajevo:

Party	Votes	%	Seats	+/–
Aleksandar Vučić—For Our Children (Serbian Progressive Party, Movement of Socialists, Social Democratic Party of Serbia)	7,644	71.22	24	+7
Ivica Dačić–Socialist Party of Serbia (SPS), United Serbia (JS)–Dragan Marković Palma	1,569	14.62	5	+2
Independent Serbian Party–Andreja Mladenović	1,006	9.37	3	New
Dr. Vojislav Šešelj–Serbian Radical Party	514	4.79	1	–1
Total	10,733	100.00	33	0
Valid votes	10,733	94.95		
Invalid/blank votes	571	5.05		
Total votes	11,304	100.00		
Registered voters/turnout	23,470	48.16		

Incumbent mayor Slobodan Adamović of the Progressive Party was confirmed for another term in office after the election.

==== Čukarica ====
Results of the election for the Municipal Assembly of Čukarica:

Party	Votes	%	Seats	+/–
Aleksandar Vučić—For Our Children (Serbian Progressive Party, Movement of Socialists, Party of United Pensioners of Serbia)	39,472	62.94	32	+11
Aleksandar Šapić–Victory for Čukarica (Serbian Patriotic Alliance, Rusyn Democratic Party)	6,269	10.00	5	New
Ivica Dačić–Socialist Party of Serbia (SPS), United Serbia (JS)–Dragan Marković Palma	6,105	9.73	4	0
METLA 2020–Miloš Jovanović (Democratic Party of Serbia, People's Strong Serbia)	3,089	4.93	2	New
"Sovereigntists" (Enough Is Enough)	2,871	4.58	2	–4
For the Kingdom of Serbia–For Our Čukarica (Movement for the Restoration of the Kingdom of Serbia, Monarchist Front)	1,704	2.72	–	New
Dr. Vojislav Šešelj–Serbian Radical Party	1,673	2.67	–	–4
Courageously–Milica Đurđević Stamenkovski–Serbian Party Oathkeepers	1,344	2.14	–	New
Citizens' Group: Serbian Right–Give Me a Chance–I Keep My Word–Marko Martinović	190	0.30	–	New
Total	62,717	100.00	45	0
Valid votes	62,717	96.45		
Invalid/blank votes	2,309	3.55		
Total votes	65,026	100.00		
Registered voters/turnout	166,969	38.94		

Incumbent mayor Srđan Kolarić of the Progressive Party was confirmed for another term in office after the election. The Socialists and the Serbian Patriotic Alliance supported the local administration.

Nikola Dragićević, a future parliamentarian, appeared in the fifteenth and final position on the Oathkeepers list.

==== Grocka ====
Results of the election for the Municipal Assembly of Grocka:

Party	Votes	%	Seats
Aleksandar Vučić—For Our Children (Serbian Progressive Party, Party of United Pensioners of Serbia, Strength of Serbia Movement, Serbian People's Party, Movement of Socialists, Independents)	20,177	65.82	26
Ivica Dačić–Socialist Party of Serbia (SPS), United Serbia (JS)–Dragan Marković Palma	4,503	14.69	5
Our Man–Blažo Stojanović	1,724	5.62	2
METLA 2020-POKS–Patriotic Bloc Grocka–For Our Town (Democratic Party of Serbia, Movement for the Restoration of the Kingdom of Serbia)	1,255	4.09	1
Milica Đurđević Stamenkovski–Serbian Party Oathkeepers	1,225	4.00	1
Sergej Trifunović–Movement of Free Citizens	879	2.87	–
Dr. Vojislav Šešelj–Serbian Radical Party	543	1.77	–
Citizens' Group: Golden Dawn–To Dawn for Us–Boban Milenković	349	1.14	–
Total	30,655	100.00	35
Valid votes	30,655	96.69	
Invalid/blank votes	1,048	3.31	
Total votes	31,703	100.00	
Registered voters/turnout	73,110	43.36	

Dragan Pantelić, elected on the For Our Children list, was chosen as mayor after the election.

Future parliamentarian Bojana Bukumirović was elected from the lead position on the Oathkeepers list.

==== Lazarevac ====
Results of the election for the Municipal Assembly of Lazarevac:

Party	Votes	%	Seats
Aleksandar Vučić—For Our Children (Serbian Progressive Party, Party of United Pensioners of Serbia, Movement of Socialists, Serbian People's Party)	16,541	53.87	35
Citizen's Group: Lazarevac–Our Home–Milan Đorđević-Đokin	5,615	18.29	12
Ivica Dačić–Socialist Party of Serbia (SPS), United Serbia (JS)–Dragan Marković Palma, Greens of Serbia (Zeleni)	3,795	12.36	8
For the Kingdom of Serbia (POKS)–Green Party of Serbia	1,333	4.34	2
Milica Đurđević Stamenkovski–Serbian Party Oathkeepers	1,161	3.78	2
Aleksandar Šapić–Victory for Lazarevac (Serbian Patriotic Alliance)	1,020	3.32	2
Lazarevac Fan Club–Milan Ralić Čombe	897	2.92	–
Dr. Vojislav Šešelj–Serbian Radical Party	345	1.12	–
Total	30,707	100.00	61
Valid votes	30,707	96.05	
Invalid/blank votes	1,264	3.95	
Total votes	31,971	100.00	
Registered voters/turnout	50,778	62.96	

Bojan Stević of the Progressive Party was selected as mayor after the election, with the support of fifty-six out of sixty-one delegates.

==== Mladenovac ====
Results of the election for the Municipal Assembly of Mladenovac:

Party	Votes	%	Seats
Aleksandar Vučić—For Our Children (Serbian Progressive Party, Social Democratic Party of Serbia, Movement of Socialists, Independents)	15,328	75.64	42
Ivica Dačić–Socialist Party of Serbia (SPS), United Serbia (JS)–Dragan Marković Palma	3,672	18.12	10
Dr. Vojislav Šešelj–Serbian Radical Party	1,265	6.24	3
Total	20,265	100.00	55
Valid votes	20,265	92.66	
Invalid/blank votes	1,606	7.34	
Total votes	21,871	100.00	
Registered voters/turnout	45,682	47.88	

Incumbent mayor Vladan Glišić of the Progressive Party (not to be confused with the former national assembly member of the same name) was confirmed for another term in office after the election.

==== New Belgrade ====
Results of the election for the Municipal Assembly of New Belgrade:

Party	Votes	%	Seats
Aleksandar Šapić–Our Mayor of New Belgrade (Serbian Patriotic Alliance)	32,497	44.87	23
Aleksandar Vučić—For Our Children (Serbian Progressive Party, Social Democratic Party of Serbia, Party of United Pensioners of Serbia, Movement of Socialists, Strength of Serbia Movement)	32,202	44.46	22
Ivica Dačić–Socialist Party of Serbia (SPS), United Serbia (JS)–Dragan Marković Palma	5,679	7.84	4
Dr. Vojislav Šešelj–Serbian Radical Party	1,480	2.04	–
Serbian Right–We Know Each Other, We Grew Up Together–Miša Vacić	574	0.79	–
Total	72,432	100.00	49
Valid votes	72,432	96.26	
Invalid/blank votes	2,811	3.74	
Total votes	75,243	100.00	
Registered voters/turnout	208,322	36.12	

Incumbent mayor Aleksandar Šapić of the Serbian Patriotic Alliance was confirmed for another term in office after the election. The Serbian Patriotic Alliance merged into the Serbian Progressive Party in 2021.

Šapić stood down as mayor of New Belgrade in June 2022 after becoming the mayor of the City of Belgrade. He was replaced by Bojan Bovan, a longtime ally of Šapić who had been elected on the list of the Serbian Patriotic Alliance and participated in the party's merger into the Progressives.

Marija Zdravković was elected to the municipal assembly from the lead position on the Progressive Party's list.

==== Obrenovac ====
Results of the election for the Municipal Assembly of Obrenovac:

Party	Votes	%	Seats
Aleksandar Vučić—For Our Children (Serbian Progressive Party, Movement of Socialists, Party of United Pensioners of Serbia)	22,820	71.79	41
Ivica Dačić–Socialist Party of Serbia (SPS), United Serbia (JS)–Dragan Marković Palma, Greens of Serbia (Zeleni)	4,058	12.77	7
Aleksandar Šapić–Victory for Obrenovac (Serbian Patriotic Alliance, Rusyn Democratic Party)	3,862	12.15	6
Dr. Vojislav Šešelj–Serbian Radical Party	1,048	3.30	1
Total	31,788	100.00	55
Valid votes	31,788	95.77	
Invalid/blank votes	1,405	4.23	
Total votes	33,193	100.00	
Registered voters/turnout	64,964	51.09	

Incumbent mayor Miroslav Čučković of the Progressive Party was confirmed for a third term in office after the election. He resigned in July 2022 after being appointed as manager of the City of Belgrade. Miloš Stanojević, also from the Progressive list, was chosen as his replacement.

==== Palilula ====
Results of the election for the Municipal Assembly of Palilula:

Party	Votes	%	Seats
Aleksandar Vučić—For Our Children (Serbian Progressive Party, Social Democratic Party of Serbia, Party of United Pensioners of Serbia, Movement of Socialists, Strength of Serbia Movement)	36,864	65.02	39
Aleksandar Šapić–Victory for Palilula (Serbian Patriotic Alliance, Rusyn Democratic Party)	6,575	11.60	6
Ivica Dačić–Socialist Party of Serbia (SPS), United Serbia (JS)–Dragan Marković Palma	5,676	10.01	6
"Sovereigntists" (Enough Is Enough)	2,192	3.87	2
Milica Đurđević Stamenkovski–Serbian Party Oathkeepers	2,118	3.74	2
Dr. Vojislav Šešelj–Serbian Radical Party	1,426	2.52	–
Green Party of Serbia	1,142	2.01	–
Čedomir Jovanović–Coalition for Peace (Party of Montenegrins, Bosniak Civic Party)	705	1.24	–
Total	56,698	100.00	55
Valid votes	56,698	96.00	
Invalid/blank votes	2,364	4.00	
Total votes	59,062	100.00	
Registered voters/turnout	173,042	34.13	

Incumbent mayor Aleksandar Jovičić of the Progressive Party was confirmed for another term in office after the election. He resigned on 28 June 2021 after being arrested on suspicion of enabling illegal construction in the municipality. Miroslav Ivanović, also elected on the For Our Children list, was chosen as his replacement on 26 July 2021.

==== Rakovica ====
Results of the election for the Municipal Assembly of Rakovica:

Party	Votes	%	Seats
Aleksandar Vučić—For Our Children (Serbian Progressive Party, Social Democratic Party of Serbia, Party of United Pensioners of Serbia, Strength of Serbia Movement, Serbian Renewal Movement, Independents)	23,598	63.06	34
Aleksandar Šapić–Victory for Rakovica (Serbian Patriotic Alliance, Rusyn Democratic Party)	4,244	11.34	6
Ivica Dačić–Socialist Party of Serbia (SPS), United Serbia (JS)–Dragan Marković Palma	4,230	11.30	6
Courageously–Milica Đurđević Stamenkovski–Serbian Party Oathkeepers	1,844	4.93	2
"Sovereigntists" (Enough Is Enough)	1,503	4.02	2
Dr. Vojislav Šešelj–Serbian Radical Party	911	2.43	–
Citizens' Group: Contract with the People	677	1.81	–
Čedomir Jovanović–Coalition for Peace–Andreja Trajković (Party of Montenegrins, Bosniak Civic Party)	415	1.11	–
Total	37,422	100.00	50
Valid votes	37,422	96.22	
Invalid/blank votes	1,470	3.78	
Total votes	38,892	100.00	
Registered voters/turnout	101,276	38.40	

Miloš Simić of the Progressive Party was selected as mayor after the election.

Dušan Stojiljković, a future member of the national assembly, appeared in the tenth position on the Oathkeepers list.

==== Savski Venac ====
Results of the election for the Municipal Assembly of Savski Venac:

Party	Votes	%	Seats
Aleksandar Vučić—For Our Children (Serbian Progressive Party, Social Democratic Party of Serbia, Party of United Pensioners of Serbia, Movement of Socialists)	6,900	60.82	23
Aleksandar Šapić–Victory for Savski Venac (Serbian Patriotic Alliance, Rusyn Democratic Party)	2,545	22.43	8
Ivica Dačić–Socialist Party of Serbia (SPS), United Serbia (JS)–Dragan Marković Palma	1,519	13.39	5
Dr. Vojislav Šešelj–Serbian Radical Party	381	3.36	1
Total	11,345	100.00	37
Valid votes	11,345	92.94	
Invalid/blank votes	862	7.06	
Total votes	12,207	100.00	
Registered voters/turnout	39,132	31.19	

Miloš Vidović of the Progressive Party was selected as mayor after the election.

==== Sopot ====
Results of the election for the Municipal Assembly of Sopot:

Party	Votes	%	Seats
Aleksandar Vučić—For Our Children (Serbian Progressive Party, Independents)	6,444	77.99	27
Ivica Dačić–Socialist Party of Serbia (SPS), United Serbia (JS)–Dragan Marković Palma	940	11.38	3
For the Kingdom of Serbia–Our Home Sopot (Movement for the Restoration of the Kingdom of Serbia, Monarchist Front)	570	6.90	2
Dr. Vojislav Šešelj–Serbian Radical Party	309	3.74	1
Total	8,263	100.00	33
Valid votes	8,263	95.88	
Invalid/blank votes	355	4.12	
Total votes	8,618	100.00	
Registered voters/turnout	17,304	49.80	

Živorad Milosavljević of the Progressive Party, the longest continuously serving mayor in Serbia, was confirmed for another term in office after the election.

==== Stari Grad ====
Results of the election for the Municipal Assembly of Stari Grad:

Party	Votes	%	Seats
Aleksandar Vučić—For Our Children (Serbian Progressive Party, Social Democratic Party of Serbia)	7,029	47.15	27
We Protect Stari Grad–United Opposition (Protectors of Stari Grad, New Party, United Democratic Serbia, Civic Democratic Forum, Democratic Bloc)	2,322	15.58	9
Ivica Dačić–Socialist Party of Serbia (SPS), United Serbia (JS)–Dragan Marković Palma	1,592	10.68	6
Heart of the City–A Movement of Free Citizens and Non-Partisan Community Initiatives to Preserve Stari Grad	1,348	9.04	5
Aleksandar Šapić–Victory for Stari Grad (Serbian Patriotic Alliance, Rusyn Democratic Party)	1,329	8.91	5
METLA 2020–Miloš Jovanović–Democratic Party of Serbia (Democratic Party of Serbia, People's Strong Serbia)	1,288	8.64	4
Total	14,908	100.00	56
Valid votes	14,908	96.25	
Invalid/blank votes	581	3.75	
Total votes	15,489	100.00	
Registered voters/turnout	53,593	28.90	

Radoslav Marjanović of the Progressive Party was chosen as mayor after the election, by a vote of forty-two to eight (with one invalid vote). The Socialist Party of Serbia–United Serbia and Serbian Patriotic Alliance lists supported Marjanović, as did some individual members of other lists. Uglješa Marković was elected from the fifth position on the Socialist Party's list; he was also elected to the national assembly in the concurrent parliamentary election.

==== Surčin ====
Results of the election for the Municipal Assembly of Surčin:

Party	Votes	%	Seats
Aleksandar Vučić—For Our Children (Serbian Progressive Party, Movement of Socialists)	13,451	72.55	26
Aleksandar Šapić–Victory for Surćin (Serbian Patriotic Alliance, Rusyn Democratic Party)	2,107	11.36	4
Ivica Dačić–Socialist Party of Serbia (SPS), United Serbia (JS)–Dragan Marković Palma, Greens of Serbia (Zeleni)	1,680	9.06	3
Citizens' Group: Family in 1st Place–For a Better Surčin	703	3.79	1
Dr. Vojislav Šešelj–Serbian Radical Party	599	3.23	1
Total	18,540	100.00	35
Valid votes	18,540	96.45	
Invalid/blank votes	682	3.55	
Total votes	19,222	100.00	
Registered voters/turnout	38,692	49.68	

Incumbent mayor Stevan Šuša of the Progressive Party was confirmed for another term in office after the election.

==== Voždovac ====
Results of the election for the Municipal Assembly of Voždovac:

Party	Votes	%	Seats
Aleksandar Vučić—For Our Children (Serbian Progressive Party, Social Democratic Party of Serbia, Party of United Pensioners of Serbia, Movement of Socialists, Strength of Serbia Movement)	33,494	61.03	38
Ivica Dačić–Socialist Party of Serbia (SPS), United Serbia (JS)–Dragan Marković Palma	5,698	10.38	6
Aleksandar Šapić–Victory for Voždovac (Serbian Patriotic Alliance, Rusyn Democratic Party)	5,406	9.85	6
METLA 2020–DSS (Democratic Party of Serbia, People's Strong Serbia)	2,752	5.01	3
"Sovereigntists" (Enough Is Enough)	1,897	3.46	2
For the Kingdom of Serbia–For Our Voždovac (Movement for the Restoration of the Kingdom of Serbia, Monarchist Front)	1,584	2.89	–
Courageously–Milica Đurđević Stamenkovski–Serbian Party Oathkeepers–Serbian People's Party	1,196	2.18	–
Dr. Vojislav Šešelj–Serbian Radical Party	1,174	2.14	–
Movement for Voždovac	815	1.49	–
Good for Voždovac	549	1.00	–
Citizens' Group: Serbian Right for Our Home Voždovac–Prof. Dr. Nenad Kapor	317	0.58	–
Total	54,882	100.00	55
Valid votes	54,882	96.37	
Invalid/blank votes	2,067	3.63	
Total votes	56,949	100.00	
Registered voters/turnout	160,826	35.41	

Ivana Tomić Ilić of the Progressive Party was selected as mayor following the election. The new municipal administration included the Socialist Party and the Serbian Patriotic Alliance, and was supported by forty-seven members of the assembly.

==== Vračar ====
Results of the election for the Municipal Assembly of Vračar:

Party	Votes	%	Seats
Aleksandar Vučić—For Our Children (Serbian Progressive Party, Social Democratic Party of Serbia, Party of United Pensioners of Serbia, Movement of Socialists)	10,345	53.04	34
Ivica Dačić–Socialist Party of Serbia (SPS), United Serbia (JS)–Dragan Marković Palma	2,814	14.43	9
Let's Free Vračar–United Opposition of Vračar (Movement of Free Citizens–Sergej Trifunović–Social Democratic Party–New Party (PSG, SDS, Nova))	2,029	10.40	6
METLA 2020–DSS–Topolska Association (Democratic Party of Serbia, People's Strong Serbia)	1,556	7.98	5
Aleksandar Šapić–Victory for Vračar (Serbian Patriotic Alliance, Rusyn Democratic Party)	1,520	7.79	5
Vračar Vračarians–Association for Beautification	639	3.28	2
Green Movement Vračar–For Greener and Cleaner Vračar (Russian Party, Green Party of Serbia)	601	3.08	2
Total	19,504	100.00	63
Valid votes	19,504	96.28	
Invalid/blank votes	753	3.72	
Total votes	20,257	100.00	
Registered voters/turnout	63,444	31.93	

Incumbent mayor Milan Nedeljković of the Progressive Party was confirmed for another term in office after the election, by a vote of forty-eight to six. The Socialist Party participated in the municipality's coalition government, which was also supported by the Serbian Patriotic Alliance, the Vračar Vračarians, and the Green Movement Vračar. The United Opposition of Vračar and DSS were in opposition.

Konstantin Samofalov of the Social Democratic Party was elected from the lead position on the United Opposition of Vračar list. He resigned his seat on 4 September 2023, shortly after leaving the Social Democratic Party to join the Party of Freedom and Justice (SSP).

==== Zemun ====
Results of the election for the Municipal Assembly of Zemun:

Party	Votes	%	Seats
Aleksandar Vučić—For Our Children (Serbian Progressive Party, Social Democratic Party of Serbia, Party of United Pensioners of Serbia, Movement of Socialists, Strength of Serbia Movement)	38,924	62.96	42
Ivica Dačić–Socialist Party of Serbia (SPS), United Serbia (JS)–Dragan Marković Palma	5,768	9.33	6
Aleksandar Šapić–Victory for Zemun (Serbian Patriotic Alliance, Rusyn Democratic Party)	5,437	8.79	5
Dr. Vojislav Šešelj–Serbian Radical Party	2,500	4.04	2
Citizens' Group: United for Zemun and Batajnica–Prof. Dr. Danica Grujičić	2,364	3.82	2
"Sovereigntists" (Enough Is Enough)	1,507	2.44	–
Let's Save Zemun–Siniša Ercegovčević	1,422	2.30	–
Milica Đurđević Stamenkovski–Serbian Party Oathkeepers	1,078	1.74	–
For the Kingdom of Serbia, For Zemun City and Batajnica Municipality–Prof. Dr. Goran Belojević (Movement for the Restoration of the Kingdom of Serbia, Monarchist Front)	1,073	1.74	–
Tatjana Macura–United Democratic Serbia (Party of Modern Serbia, Democratic Bloc)	1,019	1.65	–
Green Party of Serbia	611	0.99	–
Serbian Right–Patriotically Strong–For Our Home Zemun–Željko Kozlina	125	0.20	–
Total	61,828	100.00	57
Valid votes	61,828	96.83	
Invalid/blank votes	2,027	3.17	
Total votes	63,855	100.00	
Registered voters/turnout	164,936	38.72	

Gavrilo Kovačević of the Progressive Party was selected as mayor after the election. Aleksandar Šešelj was elected to the assembly at the head of the Radical Party list; he resigned on 10 September 2020.

==== Zvezdara ====
Results of the election for the Municipal Assembly of Zvezdara:

Party	Votes	%	Seats
Aleksandar Vučić—For Our Children (Serbian Progressive Party, Social Democratic Party of Serbia, Party of United Pensioners of Serbia, Movement of Socialists, Serbian Renewal Movement)	28,028	57.22	35
Ivica Dačić–Socialist Party of Serbia (SPS), United Serbia (JS)–Dragan Marković Palma	6,348	12.96	7
Aleksandar Šapić–Victory for Zvezdara (Serbian Patriotic Alliance, Rusyn Democratic Party)	5,178	10.57	6
METLA 2020–DSS (Democratic Party of Serbia, People's Strong Serbia)	2,583	5.27	3
"Sovereigntists" (Enough Is Enough)	1,836	3.75	2
Milica Đurđević Stamenkovski–Serbian Party Oathkeepers	1,272	2.60	–
Dr. Vojislav Šešelj–Serbian Radical Party	998	2.04	–
United Democratic Zvezdara–Zoran Vuletić	865	1.77	–
Our Zvezdara–Milan Popović	754	1.54	–
Citizens' Group: Mirijevo	684	1.40	–
Zvezdara–Our Home–NS (New Serbia)	435	0.89	–
Total	48,981	100.00	53
Valid votes	48,981	96.43	
Invalid/blank votes	1,811	3.57	
Total votes	50,792	100.00	
Registered voters/turnout	157,935	32.16	

Vladan Jeremić of the Progressive Party was chosen as after following the election, with the support of forty-six of the fifty delegates in attendance. The Socialists and the Serbian Patriotic Alliance supported the new administration.

Marija Leković was elected from the lead position on the Victory for Zvezdara list. She was also elected to the national assembly and resigned her seat in the municipal assembly on 4 September 2020.

=== Vojvodina ===
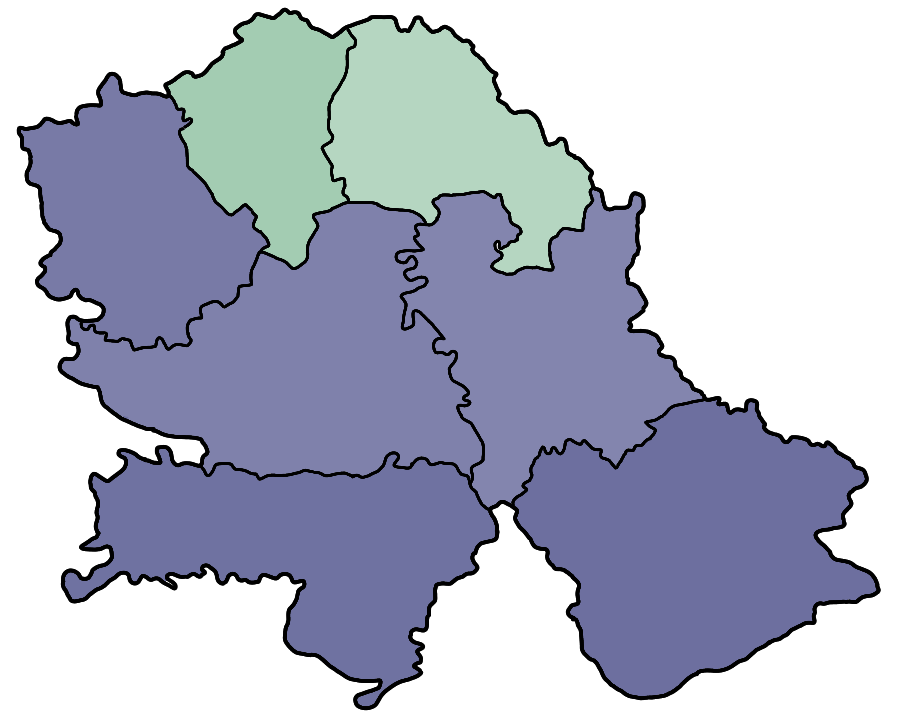
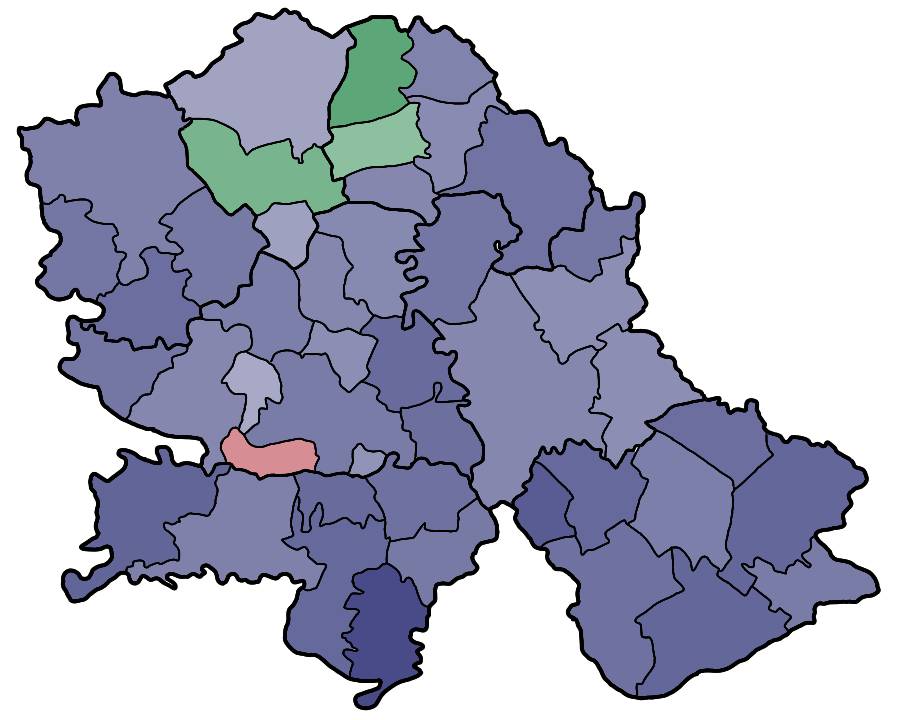

==== Central Banat District ====
Local elections were held in the one city (Zrenjanin) and all four of the municipalities in the Central Banat District. The Progressive Party and its allies won majority victories in all jurisdictions.

===== Zrenjanin =====
Results of the election for the City Assembly of Zrenjanin:

Party	Votes	%	Seats
Aleksandar Vučić—For Our Children (Serbian Progressive Party, Social Democratic Party of Serbia, Party of United Pensioners of Serbia, Movement of Socialists)	22,996	56.31	42
Ivica Dačić–Socialist Party of Serbia, United Serbia–Dragan Marković Palma	6,070	14.86	11
METLA 2020–Fight for Water, Air, Earth–Zoran Sandić (Democratic Party of Serbia, People's Strong Serbia)	2,722	6.66	5
Vojvodina Front–United for Democratic Novi Sad (League of Social Democrats of Vojvodina, Vojvodina's Party, Together for Vojvodina, Democratic Alliance of Croats in Vojvodina–Nenad Čanak)	2,545	6.23	4
Alliance of Vojvodina Hungarians–István Pásztor	1,845	4.52	3
"Sovereigntists" (Enough Is Enough)	1,302	3.19	2
Green Party–Aleksandar Jankov	1,118	2.74	–
For the Kingdom of Serbia–Petrovgrad My City (Movement for the Restoration of the Kingdom of Serbia, Monarchist Front)	1,110	2.72	–
Dr. Vojislav Šešelj–Serbian Radical Party	750	1.84	–
Common Sense–Dalibor Radosavljević	383	0.94	–
Total	40,841	100.00	67
Valid votes	40,841	95.84	
Invalid/blank votes	1,774	4.16	
Total votes	42,615	100.00	
Registered voters/turnout	102,942	41.40	

Simo Salapura of the Progressive Party was selected as mayor after the election. Dubravka Kralj was elected from the second position on the Socialist Party's list; she was also elected to the national assembly in the concurrent parliamentary election.

===== Nova Crnja =====
Results of the election for the Municipal Assembly of Nova Crnja:

Party	Votes	%	Seats
Aleksandar Vučić—For Our Children (Serbian Progressive Party, Social Democratic Party of Serbia)	3,554	63.82	17
Pera Milankov–Vojvodina Front (Democratic Alliance of Croats in Vojvodina, Together for Vojvodina)	880	15.80	4
Alliance of Vojvodina Hungarians–István Pásztor	582	10.45	2
Ivica Dačić–Socialist Party of Serbia (SPS)	553	9.93	2
Total	5,569	100.00	25
Valid votes	5,569	96.05	
Invalid/blank votes	229	3.95	
Total votes	5,798	100.00	
Registered voters/turnout	8,284	69.99	

Incumbent mayor Vladimir Brakus of the Progressive Party was confirmed for another term in office after the election.

Attila Juhász was elected from the lead position on the VMSZ list. He resigned from the local assembly on 21 August 2020.

===== Novi Bečej =====
Results of the election for the Municipal Assembly of Novi Bečej:

Party	Votes	%	Seats
Aleksandar Vučić—For Our Children (Serbian Progressive Party, Movement of Socialists, Social Democratic Party of Serbia)	6,549	63.75	21
Vojvodina Front–United for Democratic Novi Sad (League of Social Democrats of Vojvodina, Vojvodina's Party)	1,245	12.12	4
Citizens' Group: List for the Locality	923	8.98	2
Alliance of Vojvodina Hungarians–István Pásztor	794	7.73	2
Ivica Dačić–Socialist Party of Serbia	762	7.42	2
Total	10,273	100.00	31
Valid votes	10,273	95.31	
Invalid/blank votes	506	4.69	
Total votes	10,779	100.00	
Registered voters/turnout	19,210	56.11	

Incumbent mayor Saša Maksimović of the Progressive Party was confirmed for another term in office after the election.

Ivica Milankov of the Movement of Socialists was elected from the fourth position on the Progressive Party's list.

===== Sečanj =====
Results of the election for the Municipal Assembly of Sečanj:

Party	Votes	%	Seats
Aleksandar Vučić—For Our Children (Serbian Progressive Party, Party of United Pensioners of Serbia)	3,377	52.72	13
Ivica Dačić–Socialist Party of Serbia (SPS)	1,264	19.73	5
Citizens' Group: Milimirka Beba Antić–The People Know–Milimirka Antić	863	13.47	3
Dr. Vojislav Šešelj–Serbian Radical Party	327	5.11	1
Vukašin Baćina–For a Better Municipality of Sečanj (New Serbia, People's Freedom Movement)	303	4.73	1
Party of Russians of Serbia	172	2.69	–
Alliance of Vojvodina Hungarians–István Pásztor	99	1.55	–
Total	6,405	100.00	23
Valid votes	6,405	96.04	
Invalid/blank votes	264	3.96	
Total votes	6,669	100.00	
Registered voters/turnout	10,785	61.84	

Incumbent mayor Predrag Rađenović of the Progressive Party was confirmed for another term in office after the election. He resigned from the position on 1 January 2022. Miomira Milošević of the Progressives was appointed leader of a provisional authority pending new elections in 2022.

===== Žitište =====
Results of the election for the Municipal Assembly of Žitište:

Party	Votes	%	Seats
Aleksandar Vučić—For Our Children (Serbian Progressive Party, Social Democratic Party of Serbia)	4,028	52.67	18
Ivica Dačić–Socialist Party of Serbia (SPS)–United Serbia (JS)–Dragan Marković Palma	1,337	17.48	6
Alliance of Vojvodina Hungarians–István Pásztor	876	11.46	3
For the Kingdom of Serbia–Honourable for the Municipality of Žitište–Duško Kočalka (Movement for the Restoration of the Kingdom of Serbia, Monarchist Front)	449	5.87	2
METLA 2020–Fight for Water, Air, Earth–Zoran Sandić (Democratic Party of Serbia, People's Strong Serbia)	428	5.60	1
Vojvodina Front–United for Democratic Novi Sad (League of Social Democrats of Vojvodina, Together for Vojvodina)	398	5.20	1
Dr. Vojislav Šešelj–Serbian Radical Party	131	1.71	–
Total	7,647	100.00	31
Valid votes	7,647	96.31	
Invalid/blank votes	293	3.69	
Total votes	7,940	100.00	
Registered voters/turnout	14,166	56.05	

Incumbent mayor Mitar Vučurević of the Progressive Party was confirmed for another term in office after the election.

==== North Bačka District ====
Local elections were held in the one city (Subotica) and both of the municipalities in the North Bačka District. The Progressive Party won plurality victories in Subotica and Mali Iđoš, while the Alliance of Vojvodina Hungarians won a majority victory in Bačka Topola. In all three jurisdictions, the Progressives and the Alliance of Vojvodina Hungarians formed coalition governments after the election.

===== Subotica =====
Results of the election for the City Assembly of Subotica:

Party	Votes	%	Seats
Aleksandar Vučić—For Our Children (Serbian Progressive Party, Social Democratic Party of Serbia, Party of United Pensioners of Serbia, Movement of Socialists, Strength of Serbia Movement)	24,286	43.42	31
Alliance of Vojvodina Hungarians–István Pásztor	17,131	30.63	22
Jenö Maglai–Citizens' Group: Subotica Citizens Movement	3,617	6.47	4
Ivica Dačić–"Socialist Party of Serbia (SPS)"	3,079	5.50	4
Vojvodina Front–United for a Democratic Subotica (League of Social Democrats of Vojvodina, Democratic Alliance of Croats in Vojvodina, Vojvodina's Party)	3,000	5.36	3
Bunjevci for Subotica–Alliance of Bačka Bunjevci (Alliance of Bačka Bunjevci, Bunjevci Citizens of Serbia)	1,774	3.17	2
Dr. Vojislav Šešelj–Serbian Radical Party	1,342	2.40	–
Russian Party–Igor Petrov	968	1.73	1
Croatian Democratic Forum	735	1.31	–
Total	55,932	100.00	67
Valid votes	55,932	96.08	
Invalid/blank votes	2,279	3.92	
Total votes	58,211	100.00	
Registered voters/turnout	128,566	45.28	

The Progressives and their allies formed a coalition government with the Alliance of Vojvodina Hungarians after the election. Stevan Bakić of the Progressive Party was chosen as mayor. Bálint Pásztor, who led the Alliance of Vojvodina Hungarians list, was chosen as president of the city assembly, and Imre Kern, who appeared second on the list, was chosen as deputy mayor.

Tomislav Žigmanov, the leader of the Democratic Alliance of Croats in Vojvodina, was re-elected to the assembly from the lead position on the Vojvodina Front's list. He resigned on 3 November 2022 after being appointed as a minister in the Serbian government.

===== Bačka Topola =====
Results of the election for the Municipal Assembly of Bačka Topola:

Party	Votes	%	Seats
Alliance of Vojvodina Hungarians–István Pásztor	7,627	53.19	19
Aleksandar Vučić—For Our Children (Serbian Progressive Party, Social Democratic Party of Serbia)	5,154	35.95	13
Ivica Dačić "Socialist Party of Serbia (SPS), United Serbia (JS)–Dragan Marković Palma"	1,087	7.58	2
Dr. Vojislav Šešelj–Serbian Radical Party	470	3.28	1
Total	14,338	100.00	35
Valid votes	14,338	96.41	
Invalid/blank votes	534	3.59	
Total votes	14,872	100.00	
Registered voters/turnout	29,002	51.28	

Adrián Szatmári of the Alliance of Vojvodina Hungarians was chosen as mayor after the election. A member of the Progressive Party was chosen as president of the municipal assembly.

Parliamentarian Árpád Fremond was elected to the local assembly from the sixth position on the Alliance of Vojvodina Hungarians list. He resigned on 13 December 2022, three days before he was elected as leader of Serbia's Hungarian National Council.

===== Mali Iđoš =====
Results of the election for the Municipal Assembly of Mali Iđoš:

Party	Votes	%	Seats
Aleksandar Vučić—For Our Children (Serbian Progressive Party)	2,698	44.40	12
Alliance of Vojvodina Hungarians–István Pásztor	2,661	43.80	12
Ivica Dačić "Socialist Party of Serbia (SPS), United Serbia (JS)–Dragan Marković Palma"	348	5.73	1
Vojvodina Front–United for a Democratic Mali Iđoš (League of Social Democrats of Vojvodina, Vojvodina's Party, Montenegrin Party)	205	3.37	–
Dr. Vojislav Šešelj–Serbian Radical Party	164	2.70	–
Total	6,076	100.00	25
Valid votes	6,076	96.77	
Invalid/blank votes	203	3.23	
Total votes	6,279	100.00	
Registered voters/turnout	10,282	61.07	

Incumbent mayor Marko Lazić of the Progressive Party was confirmed for another term in office after the election. A member of the Alliance of Vojvodina Hungarians was chosen as deputy mayor.

==== North Banat District ====
Local elections were held in the one city (Kikinda) and all five municipalities in the North Banat District. The Progressive Party won majority victories in all but two jurisdictions: Kanjiža (where the Alliance of Vojvodina Hungarians won a majority) and Senta (where the Alliance won a plurality victory). The Progressive Party participated in coalition governments in both of the latter jurisdictions.

===== Kikinda =====
Results of the election for the City Assembly of Kikinda:

Party	Votes	%	Seats
Aleksandar Vučić—For Our Children (Serbian Progressive Party, Social Democratic Party of Serbia, Party of United Pensioners of Serbia, Movement of Socialists)	17,301	65.02	28
Ivica Dačić–"Socialist Party of Serbia (SPS)"	2,896	10.88	4
Alliance of Vojvodina Hungarians–István Pásztor	1,319	4.96	2
"Our Little Town"	1,255	4.72	2
Aleksandar Šapić–Victory for Kikinda (Serbian Patriotic Alliance, Rusyn Democratic Party)	1,185	4.45	1
Vojvodina Front–United for a Democratic Kikinda (League of Social Democrats of Vojvodina, Together for Vojvodina) Miroslav Grujić	1,114	4.19	1
METLA 2020–Ladislav Tomić (Democratic Party of Serbia, People's Strong Serbia)	1,001	3.76	1
Dr. Vojislav Šešelj–Serbian Radical Party	537	2.02	–
Total	26,608	100.00	39
Valid votes	26,608	96.22	
Invalid/blank votes	1,045	3.78	
Total votes	27,653	100.00	
Registered voters/turnout	48,911	56.54	

Nikola Lukač of the Progressive Party was chosen as mayor after the election.

===== Ada =====
Results of the election for the Municipal Assembly of Ada:

Party	Votes	%	Seats
Aleksandar Vučić—For Our Children (Serbian Progressive Party, Social Democratic Party of Serbia)	4,065	56.22	17
Alliance of Vojvodina Hungarians–István Pásztor	2,777	38.40	11
Ivica Dačić–Socialist Party of Serbia (SPS)	389	5.38	1
Total	7,231	100.00	29
Valid votes	7,231	96.08	
Invalid/blank votes	295	3.92	
Total votes	7,526	100.00	
Registered voters/turnout	15,088	49.88	

Incumbent mayor Zoltán Bilicki of the Progressive Party was confirmed for another term in office after the election.

József Tóbiás was elected at the head of the VMSZ list and afterward became president (i.e., speaker) of the local assembly. Nándor Kiss was elected from the fourth position on the list.

===== Čoka =====
Results of the election for the Municipal Assembly of Čoka:

Party	Votes	%	Seats
Aleksandar Vučić—For Our Children (Serbian Progressive Party, Party of United Pensioners of Serbia)	2,716	54.09	14
Alliance of Vojvodina Hungarians–István Pásztor	1,903	37.90	9
Ivica Dačić–"Socialist Party of Serbia (SPS)"	402	8.01	2
Total	5,021	100.00	25
Valid votes	5,021	94.81	
Invalid/blank votes	275	5.19	
Total votes	5,296	100.00	
Registered voters/turnout	9,131	58.00	

Incumbent mayor Stana Đember of the Progressive Party was confirmed for another term in office after the election.

===== Kanjiža =====
Results of the election for the Municipal Assembly of Kanjiža:

Party	Votes	%	Seats
Alliance of Vojvodina Hungarians–István Pásztor	7,452	63.82	20
Aleksandar Vučić—For Our Children (Serbian Progressive Party, Social Democratic Party of Serbia)	2,104	18.02	5
"Ukrok–Ujedinjeni–Tandari"–Zoltan Tandari	938	8.03	2
Ivica Dačić–"Socialist Party of Serbia (SPS)"	696	5.96	1
Vojvodina Front–United for a Democratic Kanjiža–Goran Nikičić (League of Social Democrats of Vojvodina, Vojvodina's Party)	486	4.16	1
Total	11,676	100.00	29
Valid votes	11,676	97.41	
Invalid/blank votes	311	2.59	
Total votes	11,987	100.00	
Registered voters/turnout	22,052	54.36	

Incumbent mayor Róbert Fejsztámer of the Alliance of Vojvodina Hungarians was confirmed for another term in office after the election. The Progressive Party participated in the local coalition government.

Zsombor Újvári was elected on the Alliance of Vojvodina Hungarians list and was appointed to the municipal council on 21 August 2020. He was elected to the national assembly in the 2022 Serbian parliamentary election and resigned from council on 22 July 2022, as he could not hold a dual mandate as a parliamentarian and a member of the local executive.

===== Novi Kneževac =====
Results of the election for the Municipal Assembly of Novi Kneževac:

Party	Votes	%	Seats
Aleksandar Vučić—For Our Children (Serbian Progressive Party, Social Democratic Party of Serbia)	3,079	57.97	18
Alliance of Vojvodina Hungarians–István Pásztor	1,625	30.60	10
Ivica Dačić–"Socialist Party of Serbia (SPS)"	607	11.43	3
Total	5,311	100.00	31
Valid votes	5,311	94.43	
Invalid/blank votes	313	5.57	
Total votes	5,624	100.00	
Registered voters/turnout	8,954	62.81	

Incumbent mayor Radovan Uverić of the Progressive Party was confirmed for another term in office after the election. He resigned in July 2021 and was replaced by Irena Slavković from the same party. Slavković, in turn, stood down as mayor on 11 May 2022, and Uverić returned to office.

===== Senta =====
Results of the election for the Municipal Assembly of Senta:

Party	Votes	%	Seats
Alliance of Vojvodina Hungarians–István Pásztor	3,970	44.79	13
Aleksandar Vučić—For Our Children (Serbian Progressive Party, Social Democratic Party of Serbia)	2,914	32.87	10
Sándor Jozsef–Citizens' Group: Citizens' Movement for Senta	1,080	12.18	3
Citizens' Group: Together for a Better Senta	900	10.15	3
Total	8,864	100.00	29
Valid votes	8,864	96.27	
Invalid/blank votes	343	3.73	
Total votes	9,207	100.00	
Registered voters/turnout	20,384	45.17	

Incumbent mayor Rudolf Czegledi of the Alliance of Vojvodina Hungarians was confirmed for another term in office after the election. His deputy was from the Progressive Party. Former mayor Zoltán Pék was re-elected to the assembly after an absence of eight years from the third position on the Alliance of Vojvodina Hungarians list.

==== South Bačka District ====
Local elections were held in the one city (Novi Sad) and all eleven of the separate municipalities of the South Bačka District. The Progressive Party and its allies won all cities and municipalities except Beočin, where the Socialist Party won a narrow majority victory. The only other jurisdiction where the Progressives and their allies did not win an outright majority was Bački Petrovac.

The City of Novi Sad comprises two municipalities (the City municipality of Novi Sad and Petrovaradin), although their powers are very limited relative to the city government. Unlike Belgrade, Niš, and Vranje, Novi Sad does not have directly elected municipal assemblies.

===== Novi Sad =====
Results of the election for the City Assembly of Novi Sad:

Party	Votes	%	Seats
Aleksandar Vučić—For Our Children (Serbian Progressive Party, Movement for the Restoration of the Kingdom of Serbia, Social Democratic Party of Serbia, Party of United Pensioners of Serbia, Movement of Socialists, Serbian Renewal Movement, Strength of Serbia Movement, Serbian People's Party)	82,591	60.87	52
Ivica Dačić–Socialist Party of Serbia, United Serbia–Dragan Marković Palma	16,499	12.16	10
Vojvodina Front–United for a Democratic Novi Sad (League of Social Democrats of Vojvodina, Vojvodina's Party, Together for Vojvodina)	6,311	4.65	3
METLA 2020 (Democratic Party of Serbia, People's Strong Serbia)	5,728	4.22	3
Aleksandar Šapić–Victory for Novi Sad (Serbian Patriotic Alliance, Rusyn Democratic Party)	5,431	4.00	3
Dr. Vojislav Šešelj–Serbian Radical Party	5,309	3.91	3
A Completely Different Story–The People of Novi Sad	3,323	2.45	–
Alliance of Vojvodina Hungarians–István Pásztor	2,805	2.07	2
May the Masks Fall–Green Party–New Party	1,959	1.44	–
War Veterans for Serbia–Military Veterans Before Serbia	1,773	1.31	–
Truth–Adaviera–Ivana Vujasin	1,496	1.10	1
Russian Party	1,381	1.02	1
Healthy Side of the City (Healthy Serbia, People's Freedom Movement)	1,074	0.79	–
Total	135,680	100.00	78
Valid votes	135,680	95.13	
Invalid/blank votes	6,940	4.87	
Total votes	142,620	100.00	
Registered voters/turnout	332,695	42.87	

Incumbent mayor Miloš Vučević of the Progressive Party led the For Our Children list. He was subsequently confirmed for a third term as mayor by an assembly vote of seventy to six (with two invalid votes). The local government included the Progressives, the Socialists, the Serbian Patriotic Alliance, and the League of Social Democrats of Vojvodina, while the Radicals and the Democratic Party of Serbia were in opposition.

Future parliamentarian Mirka Lukić Šarkanović was re-elected to the assembly from the third position on the Socialist Party's list. Milorad Mirčić, who served as the city's mayor in the 1990s, was re-elected from the second position on the Radical Party list.

Vučević stood down as mayor in October 2022 after being appointed as a minister in the Serbian government and was replaced by fellow Progressive Party member Milan Đurić.

===== Bač =====
Results of the election for the Municipal Assembly of Bač:

Party	Votes	%	Seats
Aleksandar Vučić—For Our Children (Serbian Progressive Party, Alliance of Vojvodina Hungarians, Social Democratic Party of Serbia, Movement of Socialists)	4,417	63.97	17
Citizens' Group: My Bač – I Love Bač and I Am Fighting For My City!	792	11.47	3
Vojvodina Front–United for a Democratic Bač (League of Social Democrats of Vojvodina, Together for Vojvodina, Democratic Alliance of Croats in Vojvodina)	758	10.98	2
Ivica Dačić–"Socialist Party of Serbia (SPS)"	539	7.81	2
Dr. Vojislav Šešelj–Serbian Radical Party	399	5.78	1
Total	6,905	100.00	25
Valid votes	6,905	95.96	
Invalid/blank votes	291	4.04	
Total votes	7,196	100.00	
Registered voters/turnout	12,529	57.43	

Steva Panić of the Progressive Party was chosen as mayor after the election.

===== Bačka Palanka =====
Results of the election for the Municipal Assembly of Bačka Palanka:

Party	Votes	%	Seats
Aleksandar Vučić—For Our Children (Serbian Progressive Party, Social Democratic Party of Serbia, Party of United Pensioners of Serbia)	14,155	55.51	24
"Together for Bačka Palanka" Movement of Socialists–Party of Vojvodina Slovaks–Saša Borković, Peđa Vuletić	6,339	24.86	10
Ivica Dačić–"Socialist Party of Serbia (SPS), United Serbia (JS)–Dragan Marković Palma"	3,448	13.52	5
Dr. Vojislav Šešelj–Serbian Radical Party	1,557	6.11	2
Total	25,499	100.00	41
Valid votes	25,499	94.67	
Invalid/blank votes	1,435	5.33	
Total votes	26,934	100.00	
Registered voters/turnout	46,557	57.85	

Incumbent mayor Branislav Šušnica of the Progressive Party was confirmed for another term in office after the election.

===== Bački Petrovac =====
Results of the election for the Municipal Assembly of Bački Petrovac:

Party	Votes	%	Seats
Aleksandar Vučić—For Our Children (Serbian Progressive Party, Social Democratic Party of Serbia)	2,437	39.72	11
United Serbia–Miroslav Čeman Čepsi	2,147	34.99	9
Ivica Dačić–"Socialist Party of Serbia (SPS)"	751	12.24	3
Independent and United Ordinary People	376	6.13	1
Vojvodina Front–United for a Democratic Bački Petrovac (League of Social Democrats of Vojvodina, Vojvodina's Party, Together for Vojvodina)	293	4.78	1
"Slovaks, Let's Stay Together!–Dr. Tatjana Deman Javorníkova" (Slovaks Forward)	132	2.15	–
Total	6,136	100.00	25
Valid votes	6,136	96.80	
Invalid/blank votes	203	3.20	
Total votes	6,339	100.00	
Registered voters/turnout	11,989	52.87	

Jasna Šproh of the Progressive Party was chosen as mayor after the election, by a vote of fourteen to eleven. The Socialists supported the administration.

===== Bečej =====
Results of the election for the Municipal Assembly of Bečej:

Party	Votes	%	Seats
Aleksandar Vučić—For Our Children (Serbian Progressive Party, Social Democratic Party of Serbia, Party of United Pensioners of Serbia, Movement of Socialists)	9,158	54.55	20
Alliance of Vojvodina Hungarians–István Pásztor	5,152	30.69	11
For the Kingdom of Serbia–Dr. Kosana Nešić (Movement for the Restoration of the Kingdom of Serbia, Monarchist Front)	1,016	6.05	2
Ivica Dačić–"Socialist Party of Serbia (SPS)"	847	5.04	2
Vojvodina Front–United for a Democratic Bečej (League of Social Democrats of Vojvodina, Vojvodina's Party)	616	3.67	1
Total	16,789	100.00	36
Valid votes	16,789	95.50	
Invalid/blank votes	791	4.50	
Total votes	17,580	100.00	
Registered voters/turnout	32,787	53.62	

Incumbent mayor Dragan Tošić of the Progressive Party was confirmed for another term in office following the election, with the votes of thirty-five delegates. (The thirty-sixth delegate was absent). Former mayor Vuk Radojević was elected at the head of the Progressive list.

Tošić died on 29 March 2023. The following month, Radojević was chosen as his replacement as mayor.

===== Beočin =====
Results of the election for the Municipal Assembly of Beočin:

Party	Votes	%	Seats
Ivica Dačić–"Socialist Party of Serbia (SPS)"	4,170	47.18	12
Aleksandar Vučić—For Our Children (Serbian Progressive Party, Social Democratic Party of Serbia)	4,010	45.37	11
Dr. Vojislav Šešelj–Serbian Radical Party	240	2.72	–
United Serbia–Dragan Marković Palma	216	2.44	–
Vojvodina Front–United for a Democratic Beočin (League of Social Democrats of Vojvodina, Together for Vojvodina)–Nenad Čanak	203	2.30	–
Total	8,839	100.00	23
Valid votes	8,839	96.56	
Invalid/blank votes	315	3.44	
Total votes	9,154	100.00	
Registered voters/turnout	13,430	68.16	

Mirjana Malešević Milkić of the Socialist Party was chosen as mayor after the election. She resigned in May 2022, and the Socialists lost their majority in the assembly after the defection of two delegates. The Progressives and Socialists formed a new coalition government in June 2022, with Biljana Janković of the Progressives as mayor.

===== Srbobran =====
Results of the election for the Municipal Assembly of Srbobran:

Party	Votes	%	Seats
Aleksandar Vučić—For Our Children (Serbian Progressive Party, Movement of Socialists)	4,327	56.00	17
Ivica Dačić–"Socialist Party of Serbia (SPS), United Serbia (JS)–Dragan Marković Palma"	1,422	18.40	5
Alliance of Vojvodina Hungarians–István Pásztor	742	9.60	2
Citizens' Group: Zoran Dubvarski	619	8.01	2
Citizens' Group: Alliance for Srbobran, Turija, and Nadalj	338	4.37	1
Dr. Vojislav Šešelj–Serbian Radical Party	279	3.61	1
Total	7,727	100.00	28
Valid votes	7,727	95.87	
Invalid/blank votes	333	4.13	
Total votes	8,060	100.00	
Registered voters/turnout	13,581	59.35	

Radivoje Debeljački of the Progressive Party was chosen as mayor after the election.

===== Sremski Karlovci =====
Results of the election for the Municipal Assembly of Sremski Karlovci:

Party	Votes	%	Seats
Aleksandar Vučić—For Our Children (Serbian Progressive Party, Party of United Pensioners of Serbia)	2,002	50.50	14
"Karlovac List"–Dr. Ivan Stijepović	509	12.84	3
Dr. Vojislav Šešelj–Serbian Radical Party	498	12.56	3
Ivica Dačić–Socialist Party of Serbia, United Serbia–Dragan Marković Palma	492	12.41	3
Vojvodina Front–United for a Democratic Sremski Karlovci (League of Social Democrats of Vojvodina, Vojvodina's Party)	262	6.61	1
For the Kingdom of Serbia–For the Royal City of Sremski Karlovci (Movement for the Restoration of the Kingdom of Serbia, Monarchist Front)	201	5.07	1
Total	3,964	100.00	25
Valid votes	3,964	96.10	
Invalid/blank votes	161	3.90	
Total votes	4,125	100.00	
Registered voters/turnout	8,313	49.62	

Aleksandar Stojkečić of the Progressive Party was chosen as mayor after the election; the Radical Party delegates boycotted the vote.

===== Temerin =====
Results of the election for the Municipal Assembly of Temerin:

Party	Votes	%	Seats
Aleksandar Vučić—For Our Children (Serbian Progressive Party, Movement of Socialists)	7,264	53.16	18
Alliance of Vojvodina Hungarians–István Pásztor	2,392	17.50	6
For the Kingdom of Serbia (Movement for the Restoration of the Kingdom of Serbia, Monarchist Front)	1,657	12.13	4
Ivica Dačić–"Socialist Party of Serbia (SPS), United Serbia (JS)–Dragan Marković Palma"	1,361	9.96	3
Dr. Vojislav Šešelj–Serbian Radical Party	564	4.13	1
Vojvodina Front–United for a Democratic Temerin (League of Social Democrats of Vojvodina, Together for Vojvodina)	427	3.12	1
Total	13,665	100.00	33
Valid votes	13,665	96.35	
Invalid/blank votes	517	3.65	
Total votes	14,182	100.00	
Registered voters/turnout	23,837	59.50	

Mladen Zec of the Progressive Party was chosen as mayor after the election.

===== Titel =====
Results of the election for the Municipal Assembly of Titel:

Party	Votes	%	Seats
Aleksandar Vučić—For Our Children (Serbian Progressive Party, Alliance of Vojvodina Hungarians)	5,228	66.92	18
Ivica Dačić–"Socialist Party of Serbia, United Serbia–Dragan Marković Palma"	979	12.53	3
Movement of Socialists Vladimir Soro	780	9.98	2
Dr. Vojislav Šešelj–Serbian Radical Party	307	3.93	1
"All for Šajkaška"	286	3.66	1
For the Kingdom of Serbia (Movement for the Restoration of the Kingdom of Serbia, Monarchist Front)	232	2.97	–
Total	7,812	100.00	25
Valid votes	7,812	96.11	
Invalid/blank votes	316	3.89	
Total votes	8,128	100.00	
Registered voters/turnout	12,946	62.78	

Incumbent mayor Dragan Božić of the Progressive Party was confirmed for another term in office after the election.

===== Vrbas =====
Results of the election for the Municipal Assembly of Vrbas:

Party	Votes	%	Seats
Aleksandar Vučić—For Our Children (Serbian Progressive Party, Social Democratic Party of Serbia, Party of United Pensioners of Serbia, Movement of Socialists, Alliance of Vojvodina Hungarians)	11,748	59.65	22
Ivica Dačić–"Socialist Party of Serbia (SPS), United Serbia (JS)–Dragan Marković Palma"	3,596	18.26	7
Citizens' Group: Let's Free Vrbas	2,119	10.76	4
Dr. Vojislav Šešelj–Serbian Radical Party	1,023	5.19	2
Movement for the Restoration of the Kingdom of Serbia–Ana Stokuća (Movement for the Restoration of the Kingdom of Serbia, Monarchist Front)	734	3.73	1
War Veterans for Serbia–Military Veterans Before Serbia	474	2.41	–
Total	19,694	100.00	36
Valid votes	19,694	95.58	
Invalid/blank votes	911	4.42	
Total votes	20,605	100.00	
Registered voters/turnout	34,941	58.97	

Predrag Rojević of the Progressive Party was chosen as mayor after the election. Milan Glušac, who had previously served two terms as mayor between 2016 and 2020, was chosen as deputy mayor. The government was supported by the Progressives, the Socialists, and the Radicals.

Glašuc resigned as deputy mayor on 18 May 2021 and returned as a member of the municipal assembly on 30 June.

===== Žabalj =====
Results of the election for the Municipal Assembly of Žabalj:

Party	Votes	%	Seats
Aleksandar Vučić—For Our Children (Serbian Progressive Party, Movement of Socialists)	7,760	69.44	15
Ivica Dačić–"Socialist Party of Serbia (SPS)"	1,060	9.49	2
For the Kingdom of Serbia–For the Royal Municipality of Žabalj (Movement for the Restoration of the Kingdom of Serbia, Monarchist Front)	670	6.00	1
Vojvodina Front–Nenad Čanak (League of Social Democrats of Vojvodina, Together for Vojvodina)	612	5.48	1
United Serbia–Dragan Marković Palma	584	5.23	1
Dr. Vojislav Šešelj–Serbian Radical Party	489	4.38	1
Total	11,175	100.00	21
Valid votes	11,175	94.70	
Invalid/blank votes	625	5.30	
Total votes	11,800	100.00	
Registered voters/turnout	21,637	54.54	

Incumbent mayor Čedomir Božić of the Progressive Party was confirmed for a new term in office after the election, with the support of nineteen delegates. (The other two delegates were not present.) He was succeeded by Uroš Radanović of the same party on 30 October 2020.

==== South Banat District ====
Local elections were held in both cities (i.e., Pančevo and Vršac) and all six municipalities of the South Banat District. The Progressive Party and its allies won majority victories in all jurisdictions.

===== Pančevo =====
Results of the election for the City Assembly of Pančevo:

Party	Votes	%	Seats
Aleksandar Vučić—For Our Children (Serbian Progressive Party, Social Democratic Party of Serbia, Party of United Pensioners of Serbia)	31,624	66.06	47
Citizens' Group: "Pančevci 2000" "For Your City"	7,020	14.66	10
Ivica Dačić–"Socialist Party of Serbia (SPS) United Serbia (JS)–Dragan Marković Palma"	5,973	12.48	9
Dr. Vojislav Šešelj–Serbian Radical Party	1,817	3.80	2
Alliance of Vojvodina Hungarians–István Pásztor	1,441	3.01	2
Total	47,875	100.00	70
Valid votes	47,875	93.47	
Invalid/blank votes	3,343	6.53	
Total votes	51,218	100.00	
Registered voters/turnout	109,072	46.96	

Aleksandar Stevanović of the Serbian Progressive Party was chosen as mayor after the election.

===== Alibunar =====
Results of the election for the Municipal Assembly of Alibunar:

Party	Votes	%	Seats
Aleksandar Vučić—For Our Children (Serbian Progressive Party)	5,822	60.11	16
Ivica Dačić–"Socialist Party of Serbia (SPS)"	1,257	12.98	3
Citizens' Group: Together for the Municipality of Alibunar–Aleksandar Kutlešić	929	9.59	2
Vojvodina Front–League of Social Democrats of Vojvodina (League of Social Democrats of Vojvodina, Together for Vojvodina), Nenad Čanak	653	6.74	1
Citizens' Group: Freedom–Belić Predrag	637	6.58	1
For the Kingdom of Serbia – For the Royal Municipality of Alibunar (Movement for the Restoration of the Kingdom of Serbia, Monarchist Front)	242	2.50	–
Dr. Vojislav Šešelj–Serbian Radical Party	146	1.51	–
Total	9,686	100.00	23
Valid votes	9,686	95.31	
Invalid/blank votes	477	4.69	
Total votes	10,163	100.00	
Registered voters/turnout	17,819	57.03	

Zorana Bratić of the Serbian Progressive Party was chosen as mayor after the election.

===== Bela Crkva =====
Results of the election for the Municipal Assembly of Bela Crkva:

Party	Votes	%	Seats
Aleksandar Vučić—For Our Children (Serbian Progressive Party)	5,297	60.82	21
Vojvodina Front–United for a Democratic Bela Crkva (League of Social Democrats of Vojvodina, Together for Vojvodina), Nenad Čanak–Sandra Ristić	2,230	25.61	9
Citizens' Group: Alliance for Bela Crkva, Vračev Gaj, Kusić, Jasenovo, Kruščica, Grebenac, Dupljaja, Banatska Palanka, Crvena Crkva, Kajtasovo, Dobričevo, Banatska Subotica, Kaluđerovo, and Češko Selo	700	8.04	2
Ivica Dačić–"Socialist Party of Serbia (SPS)"	482	5.53	1
Total	8,709	100.00	33
Valid votes	8,709	95.44	
Invalid/blank votes	416	4.56	
Total votes	9,125	100.00	
Registered voters/turnout	16,026	56.94	

Violeta Simić of the Serbian Progressive Party was chosen as mayor after the election.

===== Kovačica =====
Results of the election for the Municipal Assembly of Kovačica:

Party	Votes	%	Seats
Aleksandar Vučić—For Our Children (Serbian Progressive Party, Social Democratic Party of Serbia)	6,718	69.56	21
Vojvodina Front–United for a Democratic Kovačica (League of Social Democrats of Vojvodina, Together for Vojvodina)	1,289	13.35	4
Ivica Dačić–"Socialist Party of Serbia (SPS)"	1,167	12.08	3
Alliance of Vojvodina Hungarians–István Pásztor	484	5.01	1
Total	9,658	100.00	29
Valid votes	9,658	94.52	
Invalid/blank votes	560	5.48	
Total votes	10,218	100.00	
Registered voters/turnout	21,717	47.05	

Jaroslav Hrubik of the Serbian Progressive Party was chosen as mayor after the election.

===== Kovin =====
Results of the election for the Municipal Assembly of Kovin:

Party	Votes	%	Seats
Aleksandar Vučić—For Our Children (Serbian Progressive Party)	9,684	71.31	33
Ivica Dačić-"Socialist Party of Serbia (SPS)–United Serbia-Dragan Marković Palma"	2,760	20.32	9
Alliance of Vojvodina Hungarians–István Pásztor	1,137	8.37	3
Total	13,581	100.00	45
Valid votes	13,581	92.11	
Invalid/blank votes	1,163	7.89	
Total votes	14,744	100.00	
Registered voters/turnout	28,532	51.68	

Incumbent mayor Sanja Petrović of the Serbian Progressive Party was confirmed for another term in office after the election.

===== Opovo =====
Results of the election for the Municipal Assembly of Opovo:

Party	Votes	%	Seats
Aleksandar Vučić—For Our Children (Serbian Progressive Party, Social Democratic Party of Serbia)	3,514	76.49	19
Ivica Dačić–"Socialist Party of Serbia (SPS), United Russian Party–Žanna Knežević"	891	19.39	5
Democratic Party of Macedonians–Dr. Nenad Krstevski	189	4.11	1
Total	4,594	100.00	25
Valid votes	4,594	94.78	
Invalid/blank votes	253	5.22	
Total votes	4,847	100.00	
Registered voters/turnout	8,117	59.71	

Miloš Markov of the Serbian Progressive Party was chosen as mayor after the election.

===== Plandište =====
Results of the election for the Municipal Assembly of Plandište:

Party	Votes	%	Seats
Aleksandar Vučić—For Our Children (Serbian Progressive Party, Party of United Pensioners of Serbia)	3,556	68.49	14
Ivica Dačić–"Socialist Party of Serbia (SPS)"	773	14.89	3
Citizens' Group: For a Better Municipality of Plandište–Lawyer Lukić Danilo	671	12.92	2
Dr. Vojislav Šešelj Serbian Radical Party	192	3.70	–
Total	5,192	100.00	19
Valid votes	5,192	93.20	
Invalid/blank votes	379	6.80	
Total votes	5,571	100.00	
Registered voters/turnout	9,027	61.71	

Incumbent mayor Jovan Repac of the Serbian Progressive Party was confirmed for another term in office after the election.

===== Vršac =====
Results of the election for the City Assembly of Vršac:

Party	Votes	%	Seats
Aleksandar Vučić—For Our Children (Serbian Progressive Party, Party of United Pensioners of Serbia)	15,142	71.01	33
Vojvodina Front–United for a Democratic Vršac (League of Social Democrats of Vojvodina, Vojvodina's Party)	2,736	12.83	6
Ivica Dačić–"Socialist Party of Serbia (SPS), United Serbia (JS)–Dragan Marković Palma"	2,593	12.16	5
Dr. Vojislav Šešelj Serbian Radical Party	852	4.00	1
Total	21,323	100.00	45
Valid votes	21,323	93.12	
Invalid/blank votes	1,575	6.88	
Total votes	22,898	100.00	
Registered voters/turnout	45,587	50.23	

Incumbent mayor Dragana Mitrović of the Serbian Progressive Party was confirmed for another term in office after the election.

==== Srem District ====
Local elections were held in the one city (Sremska Mitrovica) and the six other municipalities of the Srem District. The Progressives and their allies won majority victories in all jurisdictions.

===== Sremska Mitrovica =====
Results of the election for the City Assembly of Sremska Mitrovica:

Party	Votes	%	Seats
Aleksandar Vučić—For Our Children (Serbian Progressive Party, Social Democratic Party of Serbia, Party of United Pensioners of Serbia, Movement of Socialists)	23,164	59.30	42
Citizens' Group: A City for All of Us–Vladimir Petković	6,434	16.47	11
Ivica Dačić–"Socialist Party of Serbia (SPS)"	3,473	8.89	6
Citizens' Group: Mitrovica Alternative–Movement of Free Citizens–Dr. Miroslav Kendrišić	1,415	3.62	2
Vojvodina Front–European Green Party (League of Social Democrats of Vojvodina, Liberal Democratic Party, European Green Party)	1,187	3.04	–
For the Kingdom of Serbia (Movement for the Restoration of the Kingdom of Serbia, Monarchist Front)–Dr. Jelica Jelikić	1,065	2.73	–
METLA 2020 (Democratic Party of Serbia, People's Strong Serbia)	782	2.00	–
Dr. Vojislav Šešelj–Serbian Radical Party	772	1.98	–
Citizens' Group: New Team for Mitrovica	771	1.97	–
Total	39,063	100.00	61
Valid votes	39,063	94.44	
Invalid/blank votes	2,300	5.56	
Total votes	41,363	100.00	
Registered voters/turnout	69,478	59.53	

Svetlana Milovanović of the Serbian Progressive Party was chosen as mayor after the election.

===== Inđija =====
Results of the election for the Municipal Assembly of Inđija:

Party	Votes	%	Seats
Aleksandar Vučić—For Our Children (Serbian Progressive Party, People's Peasant Party)	14,342	66.50	25
Citizens' Group: "Inđijaiti"–Dr. Milica Kalinić	2,682	12.44	5
Ivica Dačić–"Socialist Party of Serbia (SPS)"	2,081	9.65	3
Citizens' Group: Citizen 2020–Strahinja Jovanović	1,705	7.91	3
Dr. Vojislav Šešelj–Serbian Radical Party	757	3.51	1
Total	21,567	100.00	37
Valid votes	21,567	96.21	
Invalid/blank votes	849	3.79	
Total votes	22,416	100.00	
Registered voters/turnout	41,078	54.57	

Incumbent mayor Vladimir Gak of the Serbian Progressive Party was confirmed for another term in office after the election.

===== Irig =====
Results of the election for the Municipal Assembly of Irig:

Party	Votes	%	Seats
Aleksandar Vučić—For Our Children (Serbian Progressive Party, Social Democratic Party of Serbia, Party of United Pensioners of Serbia, Movement of Socialists)	3,468	69.08	15
Ivica Dačić–"Socialist Party of Serbia (SPS)"	493	9.82	2
Vojvodina Front–United for a Democratic Irig (League of Social Democrats of Vojvodina, Together for Vojvodina)–Nenad Čanak	440	8.76	1
For the Kingdom of Serbia–For the Royal Municipality of Irig (Movement for the Restoration of the Kingdom of Serbia, Monarchist Front)	396	7.89	1
Dr. Vojislav Šešelj–Serbian Radical Party	223	4.44	–
Total	5,020	100.00	19
Valid votes	5,020	95.75	
Invalid/blank votes	223	4.25	
Total votes	5,243	100.00	
Registered voters/turnout	9,146	57.33	

Tihomir Stojaković of the Serbian Progressive Party was chosen as mayor after the election.

===== Pećinci =====
Results of the election for the Municipal Assembly of Pećinci:

Party	Votes	%	Seats
Aleksandar Vučić—For Our Children (Serbian Progressive Party, Movement of Socialists, Party of United Pensioners of Serbia)	8,999	83.91	26
Ivica Dačić–"Socialist Party of Serbia (SPS)"	1,124	10.48	3
Dr. Vojislav Šešelj–Serbian Radical Party	602	5.61	1
Total	10,725	100.00	30
Valid votes	10,725	94.64	
Invalid/blank votes	607	5.36	
Total votes	11,332	100.00	
Registered voters/turnout	15,833	71.57	

Siniša Đokić of the Serbian Progressive Party was chosen as mayor after the election.

===== Ruma =====
Results of the election for the Municipal Assembly of Ruma:

Party	Votes	%	Seats
Aleksandar Vučić—For Our Children (Serbian Progressive Party, Party of United Pensioners of Serbia)	16,430	69.83	31
Ivica Dačić–"Socialist Party of Serbia (SPS), United Serbia (JS)–Dragan Marković Palma"	3,545	15.07	6
Green Party of Ruma–Let the Masks Fall (Green Party, New Party)	2,317	9.85	4
Dr. Vojislav Šešelj–Serbian Radical Party	1,235	5.25	2
Total	23,527	100.00	43
Valid votes	23,527	95.57	
Invalid/blank votes	1,091	4.43	
Total votes	24,618	100.00	
Registered voters/turnout	46,478	52.97	

Incumbent mayor Slađan Mančić of the Serbian Progressive Party was confirmed for another term in office after the election. He resigned in December 2021 and was replaced by Aleksandra Ćirić of the same party.

===== Šid =====
Results of the election for the Municipal Assembly of Šid:

Party	Votes	%	Seats
Aleksandar Vučić—For Our Children (Serbian Progressive Party, Party of United Pensioners of Serbia)	11,640	71.75	28
Ivica Dačić "Socialist Party of Serbia (SPS)"	2,059	12.69	5
Vojvodina Front–United for a Democratic Šid (League of Social Democrats of Vojvodina, Vojvodina's Party, Together for Vojvodina)	1,283	7.91	3
Dr. Vojislav Šešelj–Serbian Radical Party	1,242	7.66	3
Total	16,224	100.00	39
Valid votes	16,224	94.65	
Invalid/blank votes	917	5.35	
Total votes	17,141	100.00	
Registered voters/turnout	29,839	57.44	

Zoran Semenović of the Serbian Progressive Party was chosen as mayor after the election.

===== Stara Pazova =====
Results of the election for the Municipal Assembly of Stara Pazova:

Party	Votes	%	Seats
Aleksandar Vučić—For Our Children (Serbian Progressive Party, Movement of Socialists, Party of United Pensioners of Serbia)	17,488	62.23	37
Ivica Dačić–"Socialist Party of Serbia (SPS), United Serbia (JS)–Dragan Marković Palma"	2,624	9.34	5
Citizens' Group: Choice for Our Municipality–Milan Turanjanin	1,975	7.03	4
Citizens' Group: Movement for the Municipality of Nova Pazova–Ana Pejović Stanković	1,563	5.56	3
Green Party–Dušan Kandić	1,322	4.70	2
Citizens' Group: Danube Movement	946	3.37	2
For the Kingdom of Serbia–Darko Mačkić (Movement for the Restoration of the Kingdom of Serbia, Monarchist Front)	841	2.99	–
Dr. Vojislav Šešelj–Serbian Radical Party	738	2.63	–
Citizens' Group: Fist on the Table	604	2.15	–
Total	28,101	100.00	53
Valid votes	28,101	95.95	
Invalid/blank votes	1,187	4.05	
Total votes	29,288	100.00	
Registered voters/turnout	55,379	52.89	

Incumbent mayor Đorđe Radinović of the Serbian Progressive Party was confirmed for another term in office after the election.

==== West Bačka District ====
Local elections were held in the one city (Sombor) and two of the three municipalities of the West Bačka District; the exception was Kula, where the last local election had taken place in 2018. The Progressives and their allies won majority victories in all jurisdictions that held elections.

===== Sombor =====
Results of the election for the City Assembly of Sombor:

Party	Votes	%	Seats
Aleksandar Vučić—For Our Children (Serbian Progressive Party, Social Democratic Party of Serbia, Party of United Pensioners of Serbia, Movement of Socialists)	19,695	58.91	39
New Face of Sombor (Movement for the Restoration of the Kingdom of Serbia, Monarchist Front)	2,862	8.56	5
Ivica Dačić–"Socialist Party of Serbia (SPS), United Serbia (JS)–Dragan Marković Palma"	2,861	8.56	5
Alliance of Vojvodina Hungarians–István Pásztor	2,613	7.82	5
METLA 2020–Let's Clean Sombor (Democratic Party of Serbia, People's Strong Serbia)	1,711	5.12	3
Dr. Vojislav Šešelj–Serbian Radical Party	1,295	3.87	2
Vojvodina Front–United for Democratic Sombor (League of Social Democrats of Vojvodina, Vojvodina's Party, Together for Vojvodina, Democratic Alliance of Croats in Vojvodina)	1,104	3.30	2
Sombor People's Blok–Dr. Miroslav Stojisavljević (New Serbia, People's Freedom Movement, Strength of Serbia Movement)	972	2.91	–
Citizens' Group: SzS - Alliance for Sombor	322	0.96	–
Total	33,435	100.00	61
Valid votes	33,435	95.71	
Invalid/blank votes	1,499	4.29	
Total votes	34,934	100.00	
Registered voters/turnout	73,479	47.54	

Antonio Ratković of the Serbian Progressive Party was chosen as mayor after the election.

Future parliamentarian Emese Úri appeared in the sixth position on list of the Alliance of Vojvodina Hungarians. She had the opportunity to enter the assembly later in 2020 as the replacement for another delegate, but she declined her mandate, and the next candidate on the list received it in her place.

===== Apatin =====
Results of the election for the Municipal Assembly of Apatin:

Party	Votes	%	Seats
Aleksandar Vučić—For Our Children (Serbian Progressive Party, Social Democratic Party of Serbia, Party of United Pensioners of Serbia)	8,307	63.84	20
Ivica Dačić–"Socialist Party of Serbia (SPS), United Serbia (JS)–Dragan Marković Palma"	1,830	14.06	4
Alliance of Vojvodina Hungarians–István Pásztor	1,048	8.05	2
Dr. Vojislav Šešelj–Serbian Radical Party	618	4.75	1
People's Blok–Perica Popić (New Serbia, People's Freedom Movement)	607	4.66	1
Movement for the Restoration of the Kingdom of Serbia	602	4.63	1
Total	13,012	100.00	29
Valid votes	13,012	95.63	
Invalid/blank votes	595	4.37	
Total votes	13,607	100.00	
Registered voters/turnout	25,414	53.54	

Dubravka Korać of the Progressive Party was chosen as mayor after the election.

===== Kula =====
There was no municipal election in Kula in 2020. The previous election had taken place in 2018, and the next election took place in 2022.

===== Odžaci =====
Results of the election for the Municipal Assembly of Odžaci:

Party	Votes	%	Seats
Aleksandar Vučić—For Our Children (Serbian Progressive Party, Alliance of Vojvodina Hungarians)	10,121	68.20	19
Ivica Dačić–"Socialist Party of Serbia (SPS), United Serbia (JS)–Dragan Marković Palma"	2,571	17.32	5
Dr. Vojislav Šešelj–Serbian Radical Party	1,269	8.55	2
Citizen's Group: For a Democratic Municipality–Vesna Rogač	879	5.92	1
Total	14,840	100.00	27
Valid votes	14,840	95.74	
Invalid/blank votes	661	4.26	
Total votes	15,501	100.00	
Registered voters/turnout	25,050	61.88	

Goran Nikolić of the Progressive Party was chosen as mayor after the election.

=== Šumadija and Western Serbia ===
==== Kolubara District ====
Local elections were held in the one city (Valjevo) and four of the five other municipalities of the Kolubara District; the exception was Mionica, where the last election had been held in 2017. The Progressive Party and its allies won majority victories and formed government in all jurisdictions that held elections.

===== Valjevo =====
Results of the election for the City Assembly of Valjevo:

Party	Votes	%	Seats
Aleksandar Vučić—For Our Children (Serbian Progressive Party, Social Democratic Party of Serbia, Party of United Pensioners of Serbia, Movement of Socialists)	20,232	55.15	31
Ivica Dačić–"Socialist Party of Serbia (SPS), United Serbia (JS)–Dragan Marković Palma"	10,343	28.19	16
Aleksandar Šapić–Victory for Valjevo (Serbian Patriotic Alliance, Rusyn Democratic Party)	1,267	3.45	2
For the Kingdom of Serbia (Movement for the Restoration of the Kingdom of Serbia, Monarchist Front)	1,264	3.45	1
Citizens' Group: Lokalni Front Va–Free People	1,232	3.36	1
Citizens' Group: Brđani Initiative–Valjevo–People of Valjevo, First of All–Nemanja Radojičić	918	2.50	–
Snežana Spajić–Let's Bring Happiness Back to Valjevo (Party of Modern Serbia, Democratic Party of Serbia–METLA 2020)	547	1.49	–
Dr. Vojislav Šešelj–Serbian Radical Party	524	1.43	–
Velimir Ilić, Dragoljub Krstić–Victory, New Serbia–People's Bloc	361	0.98	–
Total	36,688	100.00	51
Valid votes	36,688	96.07	
Invalid/blank votes	1,500	3.93	
Total votes	38,188	100.00	
Registered voters/turnout	77,181	49.48	

Lazar Gojković, elected on the Serbian Progressive Party's list, was chosen as the new mayor of Valjevo after the election. Initially a non-party delegate, he became the leader of the local Progressive Party organization in 2022.

===== Lajkovac =====
Results of the election for the Municipal Assembly of Lajkovac:

Party	Votes	%	Seats
Aleksandar Vučić—For Our Children (Serbian Progressive Party, Movement of Socialists, Social Democratic Party of Serbia, Serbian Radical Party)	5,039	66.76	25
Ivica Dačić–"Socialist Party of Serbia (SPS), United Serbia (JS)–Dragan Marković Palma"	1,192	15.79	5
Courageously–Milica Đurđević Stamenkovski–Serbian Party Oathkeepers	543	7.19	2
Citizens' Group: Initiative for Lajkovac–Aleksandar Šestović	420	5.56	2
Citizens' Group: Serbian Right for Our Home Lajkovac–Darko Milanović	354	4.69	1
Total	7,548	100.00	35
Valid votes	7,548	95.69	
Invalid/blank votes	340	4.31	
Total votes	7,888	100.00	
Registered voters/turnout	11,809	66.80	

Incumbent major Andrija Živković of the Serbian Progressive Party was chosen for another term in office after the election. He resigned in October 2023 to permit a new election in December of that year and was appointed as the leader of a provisional administration.

===== Ljig =====
Results of the election for the Municipal Assembly of Ljig:

Party	Votes	%	Seats
Aleksandar Vučić—For Our Children (Serbian Progressive Party, Party of United Pensioners of Serbia)	2,734	49.27	12
Citizens' Group: For the Survival and Future of Ljig and Kačer–Dr. Miroslav Maksimović Miki	939	16.92	4
Citizens' Group: Together and Decisively for the Municipality of Ljig–Mr. Dragan Stevanović Persinac, Dipl. Inž.	862	15.53	3
Ivica Dačić–"Socialist Party of Serbia (SPS)"	796	14.34	3
Citizens' Group: It's Time for a Better Ljig–Mihailo Zečević	218	3.93	1
Total	5,549	100.00	23
Valid votes	5,549	95.43	
Invalid/blank votes	266	4.57	
Total votes	5,815	100.00	
Registered voters/turnout	9,077	64.06	

Incumbent mayor Dragan Lazarević of the Serbian Progressive Party was confirmed for another term in office after the election. He resigned in October 2023 to permit a new election in December of that year. Milomir Starčević, who had been elected to the assembly as a member of the Socialist Party of Serbia, was appointed as president of a provisional administration. In the election that followed, Starčević led the list of the Progressive Party.

===== Mionica =====
There was no municipal election in Mionica in 2020. The previous election had taken place in 2017, and the next election took place in 2021.

===== Osečina =====
Results of the election for the Municipal Assembly of Osečina:

Party	Votes	%	Seats
Aleksandar Vučić—For Our Children (Serbian Progressive Party, Movement of Socialists)	3,426	58.12	21
Citizens' Group: Get Started–Vladimir Radivojević	1,570	26.63	9
Ivica Dačić–Socialist Party of Serbia (SPS)	624	10.59	3
Aleksandar Šapić–Victory for Osečina (Serbian Patriotic Alliance, Rusyn Democratic Party)	148	2.51	–
Dr. Vojislav Šešelj–Serbian Radical Party	127	2.15	–
Total	5,895	100.00	33
Valid votes	5,895	96.07	
Invalid/blank votes	241	3.93	
Total votes	6,136	100.00	
Registered voters/turnout	9,869	62.17	

Nikola Tomić of the Serbian Progressive Party was chosen as mayor after the election. Tomić resigned on 28 September 2023 to prompt a new election in December and was appointed as president of a provisional authority.

===== Ub =====
Results of the election for the Municipal Assembly of Ub:

Party	Votes	%	Seats
Aleksandar Vučić—For Our Children (Serbian Progressive Party, Party of United Pensioners of Serbia)	11,733	82.53	26
For the Kingdom of Serbia–For Royal Ub (Movement for the Restoration of the Kingdom of Serbia, Monarchist Front)	1,259	8.86	2
Ivica Dačić–Socialist Party of Serbia	1,224	8.61	2
Total	14,216	100.00	30
Valid votes	14,216	96.46	
Invalid/blank votes	521	3.54	
Total votes	14,737	100.00	
Registered voters/turnout	23,089	63.83	

Incumbent mayor Darko Glišić of the Serbian Progressive Party was confirmed for another term in office after the election. Ivana Nikolić was elected from the fifth position on the Progressive list and was chosen afterward as president of the assembly.

Glišić resigned in October 2023 in order to prompt a new election in December and was appointed as president of a provisional authority. Nikolić was appointed as a member of the authority.

==== Mačva District ====
Local elections were held in both cities (i.e., Šabac and Loznica) and all six municipalities of the Mačva District. The Progressive Party and its allies won in all jurisdictions, taking majority victories everywhere except Ljubovija (where they fell one seat short). In each jurisdiction, a Progressive Party delegate was chosen as mayor after the elections.

===== Šabac =====
The final results of election for the City Assembly of Šabac were not announced until 17 October 2020, due to two separate repeat votes taking place in the city. Both the process and the elections themselves were extremely acrimonious.

Party	Votes	%	Seats
Aleksandar Vučić—For Our Children (Serbian Progressive Party, Social Democratic Party of Serbia, Party of United Pensioners of Serbia, Movement of Socialists)	30,232	49.37	37
Nebojša Zelenović–Šabac Is Ours (Together for Serbia, Serbian Renewal Movement)	18,023	29.43	22
Jelena Milošević–New Team for Šabac	5,939	9.70	7
METLA 2020–For Survival–Stronger Than the Boycott–Srđan Mitrašinović (Democratic Party of Serbia, People's Party)	1,853	3.03	–
Ivica Dačić–Socialist Party of Serbia, United Serbia–Dragan Marković Palma	1,300	2.12	–
For the Kingdom of Serbia–Dragan Ninković (Movement for the Restoration of the Kingdom of Serbia, Monarchist Front)	876	1.43	–
Dr. Dejan Pavlović–European Green Party	667	1.09	1
United Democratic Serbia–Opportunity (Democratic Alliance of Croats in Vojvodina, Montenegrin Party)	650	1.06	1
Russian Party–Slobodan Nikolić	646	1.05	1
Dr. Vojislav Šešelj–Serbian Radical Party	399	0.65	–
Aleksandar Šapić–Victory for Šabac (Serbian Patriotic Alliance, Rusyn Democratic Party)	340	0.56	–
Green Party–Mirjana Bingulac	310	0.51	–
Total	61,235	100.00	69
Valid votes	61,235	97.83	
Invalid/blank votes	1,361	2.17	
Total votes	62,596	100.00	
Registered voters/turnout	102,366	61.15	

Aleksandar Pajić of the Serbian Progressive Party was chosen as mayor of Šabac after the election. The new city assembly was boycotted by Zelenović's list, after Zelenović charged that the assembly was improperly constituted.

Pajić resigned on 30 October 2023 in order to prompt a new election later in the year and was appointed as leader of a provisional authority.

===== Bogatić =====
Results of the election for the Municipal Assembly of Bogatić:

Party	Votes	%	Seats
Aleksandar Vučić—For Our Children (Serbian Progressive Party, Serbian Renewal Movement)	8,006	52.27	17
Ivica Dačić–Socialist Party of Serbia (SPS)	5,110	33.36	11
Dr. Vojislav Šešelj–Serbian Radical Party	1,127	7.36	2
Grad. Eng. Aleksandar Firaunović–European Green Party	638	4.17	1
For the Kingdom of Serbia-For Royal Bogatić–Milan Mašić (Movement for the Restoration of the Kingdom of Serbia, Monarchist Front)	435	2.84	–
Total	15,316	100.00	31
Valid votes	15,316	97.10	
Invalid/blank votes	457	2.90	
Total votes	15,773	100.00	
Registered voters/turnout	24,473	64.45	

Milan Damnjamović of the Serbian Progressive Party was chosen as mayor after the election, and a new local administration was formed by the Progressives, the Radicals, and the European Green Party. The Socialists, who had been in power locally for several years prior to the 2020 election, abstained from voting on the new administration. Former parliamentarian Dragan Aćimović was elected from the lead position on the Serbian Radical Party's list and was appointed afterward as deputy speaker of the assembly.

Damnjamović resigned as mayor in October 2023 to prompt a new election later in the year and was appointed as leader of a provisional authority. Aćimović also served on the authority.

===== Koceljeva =====
Results of the election for the Municipal Assembly of Koceljeva:

Party	Votes	%	Seats
Aleksandar Vučić—For Our Children (Serbian Progressive Party, Movement of Socialists)	6,866	88.03	28
Ivica Dačić–Socialist Party of Serbia (SPS)	934	11.97	3
Total	7,800	100.00	31
Valid votes	7,800	95.55	
Invalid/blank votes	363	4.45	
Total votes	8,163	100.00	
Registered voters/turnout	11,072	73.73	

Incumbent mayor Dušan Ilinčić of the Serbian Progressive Party was confirmed for another term in office after the election. He resigned in October 2023 to prompt a new election later in the year and was appointed as leader of a provisional authority.

===== Krupanj =====
Results of the election for the Municipal Assembly of Krupanj:

Party	Votes	%	Seats
Aleksandar Vučić—For Our Children (Serbian Progressive Party, Social Democratic Party of Serbia)	5,957	68.96	25
Ivica Dačić–Socialist Party of Serbia (SPS)	1,631	18.88	6
Đorđe Todorović–Better Serbia–For Better Krupanj and Rađevina	474	5.49	2
Aleksandar Šapić–Serbian Patriotic Alliance	296	3.43	1
Dr. Vojislav Šešelj–Serbian Radical Party	280	3.24	1
Total	8,638	100.00	35
Valid votes	8,638	95.85	
Invalid/blank votes	374	4.15	
Total votes	9,012	100.00	
Registered voters/turnout	13,564	66.44	

Incumbent mayor Ivan Isailović of the Serbian Progressive Party was confirmed for another term in office after the election. Ivana Popović, who was elected to the national assembly in the concurrent parliamentary election, was also elected to the municipal assembly after receiving the fifth position on the Progressive list.

Isailović resigned as mayor October 2023 to prompt a new election later in the year and was appointed as leader of a provisional authority.

===== Ljubovija =====
Results of the election for the Municipal Assembly of Ljubovija:

Party	Votes	%	Seats
Aleksandar Vučić—For Our Children (Serbian Progressive Party, Serbian People's Party)	3,488	41.96	13
Ivica Dačić–Socialist Party of Serbia (SPS)	2,615	31.46	9
SDPS–Goran Josipović Gigo	1,076	12.95	4
Dr. Vojislav Šešelj–Serbian Radical Party	485	5.83	1
Citizens' Group: Different from the Others–Lazar Stajić	262	3.15	–
Milan Stamatović–Healthy Serbia for Healthy Ljubovija	174	2.09	–
Aleksandar Šapić–Victory for Ljubovija (Serbian Patriotic Alliance, Rusyn Democratic Party)	133	1.60	–
Citizens' Group: Serbian Right for Our Home Ljubovica	79	0.95	–
Total	8,312	100.00	27
Valid votes	8,312	96.23	
Invalid/blank votes	326	3.77	
Total votes	8,638	100.00	
Registered voters/turnout	12,253	70.50	

Milan Jovanović of the Serbian Progressive Party was chosen as mayor after the election. The government was formed by the Progressives, the SDPS, and the Radicals.

Sreto Perić was the candidate elected on the Radical Party's list. He resigned his seat on 21 April 2021.

Jovanović resigned on 30 October 2023 to prompt a new election later in the year and was appointed as leader of a provisional authority.

===== Loznica =====
Results of the election for the City Assembly of Loznica:

Party	Votes	%	Seats
Aleksandar Vučić—For Our Children (Serbian Progressive Party, Movement of Socialists)	23,803	68.46	43
Ivica Dačić–Socialist Party of Serbia, United Serbia–Dragan Marković Palma	2,955	8.50	5
Citizens' Group: Boldly for Loznica–Dragan Pajić	2,180	6.27	4
Dr. Zoran Nikolić–Better Serbia	2,052	5.90	3
Milica Đurđević Stamenkovski–Serbian Party Oathkeepers	1,467	4.22	2
Dr. Vojislav Šešelj–Serbian Radical Party	1,114	3.20	2
METLA 2020 (Democratic Party of Serbia, People's Strong Serbia)	855	2.46	–
Citizens' Group: Serbian Right for Our Home Loznica	341	0.98	–
Total	34,767	100.00	59
Valid votes	34,767	95.78	
Invalid/blank votes	1,530	4.22	
Total votes	36,297	100.00	
Registered voters/turnout	73,805	49.18	

Incumbent mayor Vidoje Petrović of the Serbian Progressive Party was confirmed for a fifth term in office following the election. The city government, which also included the Socialist Party and the Party of United Pensioners of Serbia, was endorsed by an assembly vote of fifty to five, with two invalid votes.

Petrović resigned as mayor October 2023 to prompt a new election later in the year and was appointed as leader of a provisional authority.

===== Mali Zvornik =====
Results of the election for the Municipal Assembly of Mali Zvornik:

Party	Votes	%	Seats
For Our Children (Serbian Progressive Party, Serbian People's Party, Social Democratic Party of Serbia)	4,131	55.81	17
Ivica Dačić–Socialist Party of Serbia	1,730	23.37	7
Citizens' Group: Strength of the People–Dr. Milan Lukić	862	11.65	3
Dr. Vojislav Šešelj–Serbian Radical Party	394	5.32	1
Aleksandar Šapić–Victory for Mali Zvornik (Serbian Patriotic Alliance, Rusyn Democratic Party)	285	3.85	1
Total	7,402	100.00	29
Valid votes	7,402	96.24	
Invalid/blank votes	289	3.76	
Total votes	7,691	100.00	
Registered voters/turnout	13,611	56.51	

Incumbent mayor Zoran Jevtić of the Serbian Progressive Party was confirmed for a new term in office after the election. Jevtić resigned on 30 October 2023 to prompt a new election later in the year and was appointed as leader of a provisional authority.

===== Vladimirci =====
Results of the election for the Municipal Assembly of Vladimirci:

Party	Votes	%	Seats
Aleksandar Vučić—For Our Children (Serbian Progressive Party, Social Democratic Party of Serbia)	5,966	66.27	17
For a Better Vladimirci	1,373	15.25	4
Ivica Dačić–Socialist Party of Serbia (SPS)–United Serbia (JS)–Dragan Marković Palma	1,316	14.62	3
For the Kingdom of Serbia (POKS Vladimirci)	347	3.85	1
Total	9,002	100.00	25
Valid votes	9,002	96.83	
Invalid/blank votes	295	3.17	
Total votes	9,297	100.00	
Registered voters/turnout	14,388	64.62	

Goran Zarić of the Serbian Progressive Party was chosen as mayor after the election. Zarić resigned on 30 October 2023 to prompt a new election later in the year and was appointed as leader of a provisional authority.

==== Moravica District ====
Local elections were held in the one city (Čačak) and two of the three other municipalities in the Moravica District. The Progressive Party and its allies won majority victories in all jurisdictions that held elections.

===== Čačak =====
Results of the election for the City Assembly of Čačak:

Party	Votes	%	Seats
Aleksandar Vučić—For Our Children (Serbian Progressive Party, Social Democratic Party of Serbia, Movement of Socialists, Party of United Pensioners of Serbia, Strength of Serbia Movement, Serbian People's Party, Serbian Renewal Movement)	28,579	69.13	54
Ivica Dačić–"Socialist Party of Serbia (SPS), United Serbia (JS)–Dragan Marković Palma"	4,770	11.54	9
Velimir Ilić–New Serbia–People's Bloc (New Serbia, People's Freedom Movement)	2,616	6.33	5
For the Kingdom of Serbia (Movement for the Restoration of the Kingdom of Serbia, Monarchist Front)	2,231	5.40	4
Čačak Is Ours–United Democratic Serbia	1,537	3.72	2
Dr. Vojislav Šešelj–Serbian Radical Party	862	2.09	–
Party of Russians of Serbia	744	1.80	1
Total	41,339	100.00	75
Valid votes	41,339	95.52	
Invalid/blank votes	1,938	4.48	
Total votes	43,277	100.00	
Registered voters/turnout	96,576	44.81	

Incumbent mayor Milun Todorović of the Serbian Progressive Party was confirmed for another term in office after the election.

===== Gornji Milanovac =====
Results of the election for the Municipal Assembly of Gornji Milanovac:

Party	Votes	%	Seats
Aleksandar Vučić—For Our Children (Serbian Progressive Party, Social Democratic Party of Serbia)	10,117	52.75	27
Citizens' Group: Win and Save the Municipality of Gornji Milanovac–Milisav Mirković	5,637	29.39	15
Ivica Dačić–"Socialist Party of Serbia (SPS), United Serbia (JS)–Dragan Marković Palma"	2,871	14.97	7
Dr. Vojislav Šešelj–Serbian Radical Party	554	2.89	–
Total	19,179	100.00	49
Valid votes	19,179	95.14	
Invalid/blank votes	980	4.86	
Total votes	20,159	100.00	
Registered voters/turnout	35,974	56.04	

Incumbent mayor Dejan Kovačević of the Serbian Progressive Party was confirmed for another term in office with the support of thirty-four delegates. The members of the Win and Save the Municipality of Gornji Milanovac list did not participate in the vote.

===== Ivanjica =====
Results of the election for the Municipal Assembly of Ivanjica:

Party	Votes	%	Seats
Aleksandar Vučić—For Our Children (Serbian Progressive Party, Party of United Pensioners of Serbia)	7,303	57.05	22
Ivica Dačić–Socialist Party of Serbia (SPS)	3,443	26.90	10
Milan Stamatović Healthy Serbia–For a Healthy Ivanjica	799	6.24	2
For the Kingdom of Serbia–The Best Team for Ivanjica (Movement for the Restoration of the Kingdom of Serbia, Monarchist Front)–Ivan Jovićević	774	6.05	2
Dr. Vojislav Šešelj–Serbian Radical Party	481	3.76	1
Total	12,800	100.00	37
Valid votes	12,800	96.44	
Invalid/blank votes	472	3.56	
Total votes	13,272	100.00	
Registered voters/turnout	25,628	51.79	

Momčilo Mitrović of the Progressive Party was chosen as mayor after the election.

===== Lučani =====
There was no election for the Municipal Assembly of Lučani in 2020. The previous election had taken place in 2018, and the next election took place in 2022.

==== Pomoravlje District ====
Local elections were held in the one city (Jagodina) and all five other municipalities of the Pomoravlje District. United Serbia won a majority victory in its home base of Jagodina in an alliance with the Serbian Progressive Party and the Socialist Party of Serbia. The Progressive alliance won majority victories in all other jurisdictions except Svilajnac, where incumbent mayor Predrag Milanović led his independent list to a plurality victory.

===== Jagodina =====
Results of the election for the City Assembly of Jagodina:

Party	Votes	%	Seats
"Dragan Marković Palma–United Serbia–Ivica Dačić–Socialist Party of Serbia–Aleksandar Vučić–Serbian Progressive Party", Dragan Marković Palma	18,492	69.84	17
Rebellion–Real Jagodina–Dušan Marković–Aleksandar Grković–Aleksandar Racić	3,174	11.99	2
Mita Arsić–Mita Arsić	1,981	7.48	1
Movement for the Restoration of the Kingdom of Serbia	1,384	5.23	1
Russian Party–Dipl. Ing. Srba Josijević / Dr. Vojislav Šešelj–Serbian Radical Party	897	3.39	–
Jagodina–Our Fatherland Goran Vidojević	549	2.07	–
Total	26,477	100.00	21
Valid votes	26,477	93.98	
Invalid/blank votes	1,697	6.02	
Total votes	28,174	100.00	
Registered voters/turnout	64,859	43.44	

Incumbent mayor Ratko Stevanović of United Serbia was confirmed for another term in office after the election.

Života Starčević was re-elected to the local assembly from the eighth position on the United Serbia list.

===== Ćuprija =====
Results of the election for the Municipal Assembly of Ćuprija:

Party	Votes	%	Seats
Aleksandar Vučić—For Our Children (Serbian Progressive Party, Strength of Serbia Movement)	9,398	78.24	30
Ivica Dačić–"Socialist Party of Serbia (SPS), United Serbia (JS)–Dragan Marković Palma"	1,768	14.72	5
Party of United Pensioners of Serbia–Milan Krkobabić	846	7.04	2
Total	12,012	100.00	37
Valid votes	12,012	91.88	
Invalid/blank votes	1,062	8.12	
Total votes	13,074	100.00	
Registered voters/turnout	29,222	44.74	

Jovica Antić of the Serbian Progressive Party was chosen as mayor after the election. Antić resigned in October 2023 to prompt a new election later in the year and was appointed as leader of a provisional authority.

===== Despotovac =====
Results of the election for the Municipal Assembly of Despotovac:

Party	Votes	%	Seats
Aleksandar Vučić—For Our Children (Serbian Progressive Party, Party of United Pensioners of Serbia, Strength of Serbia Movement)	6,728	60.98	19
Ivica Dačić–"Socialist Party of Serbia (SPS), United Serbia (JS)–Dragan Marković Palma"	2,841	25.75	8
Young Despotovac–For Youth to Stay and Survive in the Municipality	1,465	13.28	4
Total	11,034	100.00	31
Valid votes	11,034	96.79	
Invalid/blank votes	366	3.21	
Total votes	11,400	100.00	
Registered voters/turnout	22,666	50.30	

Incumbent mayor Nikola Nikolić of the Serbian Progressive Party was confirmed for another term in office after the election. He was replaced by fellow Progressive Zlatko Marjanović in July 2023. Marjanović in turn resigned on 30 October 2023 to prompt a new election later in the year and was appointed as leader of a provisional authority.

===== Paraćin =====
Results of the election for the Municipal Assembly of Paraćin:

Party	Votes	%	Seats
Aleksandar Vučić—For Our Children (Serbian Progressive Party, Party of United Pensioners of Serbia)	13,311	46.47	28
Saša Paunović–Surely Forward	7,001	24.44	14
All for Paraćin–Tomislav Šaletić	2,566	8.96	5
Healthy Story–You Ask Yourself, Ivan Stojanović	2,024	7.07	4
Ivica Dačić–"Socialist Party of Serbia (SPS)"	1,529	5.34	3
Dragan Marković Palma United Serbia (JS)	886	3.09	1
Movement for the Village and the City	840	2.93	–
For a Change of Government in Paraćin–Neither for One nor the Other	279	0.97	–
Grza–Paraćin Se Pita, Miroslav Mitrović	210	0.73	–
Total	28,646	100.00	55
Valid votes	28,646	97.58	
Invalid/blank votes	710	2.42	
Total votes	29,356	100.00	
Registered voters/turnout	47,961	61.21	

Vladimir Milićević of the Serbian Progressive Party was chosen as mayor after the election. Milićević resigned on 30 October 2023 to prompt a new local election later in the year and was appointed as leader of a provisional authority.

===== Rekovac =====
Results of the election for the Municipal Assembly of Rekovac:

Party	Votes	%	Seats
Aleksandar Vučić—For Our Children (Serbian Progressive Party, Party of United Pensioners of Serbia)	2,893	49.09	11
Ivica Dačić–"Socialist Party of Serbia (SPS), United Serbia (JS)–Dragan Marković Palma"	1,697	28.80	6
Citizens' Group: Dr. Dragan Prodanović	1,018	17.27	4
Dr. Spec. Danijela Ilić–Citizens' Group: Voice of Common Sense	177	3.00	–
Nebojša Isailović–Citizens' Group: Salvation for Levač	108	1.83	–
Total	5,893	100.00	21
Valid votes	5,893	96.04	
Invalid/blank votes	243	3.96	
Total votes	6,136	100.00	
Registered voters/turnout	8,774	69.93	

Incumbent mayor Aleksandar Đorđević of the Serbian Progressive Party was confirmed for another term in office after the election. Đorđević resigned on 30 October 2023 to prompt a new election later in the year and was appointed as leader of a provisional authority.

===== Svilajnac =====
Results of the election for the Municipal Assembly of Svilajnac:

Party	Votes	%	Seats
Citizens' Group: Predrag Milanović–Svilajnac Protects the Future	6,215	45.44	23
Aleksandar Vučić—For Our Children (Serbian Progressive Party, Strength of Serbia Movement, Social Democratic Party of Serbia)	4,410	32.24	16
Dr. Tanja Toskić–For a Better Svilajnac (Better Serbia, Serbian Radical Party)	1,290	9.43	4
Ivica Dačić–"Socialist Party of Serbia (SPS), United Serbia (JS)–Dragan Marković Palma"	740	5.41	2
Citizens' Group: Only Forward Svilajnac	628	4.59	2
Citizens' Group: New Power of Svilajnac–Slađan Simić	394	2.88	–
Total	13,677	100.00	47
Valid votes	13,677	97.12	
Invalid/blank votes	405	2.88	
Total votes	14,082	100.00	
Registered voters/turnout	24,373	57.78	

Incumbent mayor Predrag Milanović was confirmed for another term in office after the election.

Gorica Gajić of the Democratic Party of Serbia was elected from the second position on the "Only Forward Svilajnac" list.

==== Rasina District ====
Local elections were held in the one city (Kruševac) and all five other municipalities of the Rasina District. The Serbian Progressive Party and its allies won majority victories in all jurisdictions except Ćićevac, where they won a narrow plurality victory and formed a coalition government.

===== Kruševac =====
Results of the election for the City Assembly of Kruševac:

Party	Votes	%	Seats
Aleksandar Vučić—For Our Children (Serbian Progressive Party, Social Democratic Party of Serbia, Party of United Pensioners of Serbia, Serbian Renewal Movement, Strength of Serbia Movement)	38,915	71.10	52
Ivica Dačić–"Socialist Party of Serbia (SPS), United Serbia (JS)–Dragan Marković Palma"	6,575	12.01	8
METLA 2020 (Democratic Party of Serbia, People's Strong Serbia)	3,304	6.04	4
For the Kingdom of Serbia-For Lazarev Kruševac (Movement for the Restoration of the Kingdom of Serbia, Monarchist Front)	3,022	5.52	4
Serbian People's Party–Dr. Nenad Popović	1,785	3.26	2
Dr. Vojislav Šešelj–Serbian Radical Party	1,135	2.07	–
Total	54,736	100.00	70
Valid votes	54,736	96.00	
Invalid/blank votes	2,280	4.00	
Total votes	57,016	100.00	
Registered voters/turnout	106,940	53.32	

Incumbent mayor Jasmina Palurović of the Serbian Progressive Party was confirmed for a new term in office after the election. Palurović resigned on 30 October 2023 to prompt a new local election later in the year and was appointed as leader of a provisional authority.

===== Aleksandrovac =====
Results of the election for the Municipal Assembly of Aleksandrovac:

Party	Votes	%	Seats
Aleksandar Vučić—For Our Children (Serbian Progressive Party, Social Democratic Party of Serbia)	9,519	71.01	43
Citizens' Group: Movement for Župa–Dr. Jugoslav Stajkovac	2,628	19.60	11
Ivica Dačić "Socialist Party of Serbia (SPS), United Serbia (JS) Dragan Marković Palma"	1,258	9.38	5
Total	13,405	100.00	59
Valid votes	13,405	95.27	
Invalid/blank votes	666	4.73	
Total votes	14,071	100.00	
Registered voters/turnout	22,189	63.41	

Incumbent mayor Mirko Mihajlović of the Serbian Progressive Party was confirmed for another term in office after the election. Mihajlović resigned in October 2023 to prompt a new election later in the year and was appointed as leader of a provisional authority.

===== Brus =====
Results of the election for the Municipal Assembly of Brus:

Party	Votes	%	Seats
Aleksandar Vučić—For Our Children (Serbian Progressive Party, Social Democratic Party of Serbia)	4,565	51.34	16
Citizens' Group: "For a Modern Brus" Milutin Jeličić "Jutka"	2,146	24.14	7
Ivica Dačić–Socialist Party of Serbia (SPS)–United Serbia (JS)–Dragan Marković Palma	867	9.75	3
Citizens' Group: For Brus, Dr. Dragutin Radisavljević "Duta"	757	8.51	2
Party of United Pensioners of Serbia–Milan Krkobabić	556	6.25	1
Total	8,891	100.00	29
Valid votes	8,891	96.41	
Invalid/blank votes	331	3.59	
Total votes	9,222	100.00	
Registered voters/turnout	13,498	68.32	

Valentina Milosavljević of the Serbian Progressive Party was chosen as mayor after the election. Milosavljević resigned on 30 October 2023 to prompt a new local election later in the year and was appointed as leader of a provisional authority.

===== Ćićevac =====
Results of the election for the Municipal Assembly of Ćićevac:

Party	Votes	%	Seats
Aleksandar Vučić—For Our Children (Serbian Progressive Party, Movement of Socialists)	2,405	41.56	11
Citizens' Group: Movement for the Restoration of the Municipality of Ćićevac–Zlatan Krkić	2,203	38.07	10
Serbian Radical Party–Dr. Zoran Milivojević Batke	622	10.75	2
Citizens' Group: Only Domestic–Borko Živković	286	4.94	1
Ivica Dačić–"Socialist Party of Serbia (SPS), United Serbia (JS)–Dragan Marković Palma"	271	4.68	1
Total	5,787	100.00	25
Valid votes	5,787	97.23	
Invalid/blank votes	165	2.77	
Total votes	5,952	100.00	
Registered voters/turnout	7,518	79.17	

Mirjana Krkić of the Serbian Progressive Party was chosen as mayor after the election with the support of the Radical Party and the Socialist Party. Krkić resigned on 30 October 2023 to prompt a new election local later in the year and was appointed as leader of a provisional authority.

===== Trstenik =====
Results of the election for the Municipal Assembly of Trstenik:

Party	Votes	%	Seats
Aleksandar Vučić—For Our Children (Serbian Progressive Party, Social Democratic Party of Serbia, Party of United Pensioners of Serbia)	11,732	61.08	31
Citizens' Group: Mario Spasić–Always for the Homeland	2,691	14.01	7
Movement for the Restoration of the Kingdom of Serbia–Honourable and Honest for Our Municipality–Dr. Radovan Popović	1,922	10.01	5
Ivica Dačić–"Socialist Party of Serbia (SPS), United Serbia (JS)–Dragan Marković Palma"	1,623	8.45	4
Citizens' Group: Zinat	784	4.08	2
Dr. Vojislav Šešelj–Serbian Radical Party	457	2.38	–
Total	19,209	100.00	49
Valid votes	19,209	96.16	
Invalid/blank votes	768	3.84	
Total votes	19,977	100.00	
Registered voters/turnout	35,492	56.29	

Milena Turk of the Serbian Progressive Party was chosen as mayor after the election. Turk resigned on 30 October 2023 to prompt a new election later in the year and was appointed as leader of a provisional authority.

===== Varvarin =====
Results of the election for the Municipal Assembly of Varvarin:

Party	Votes	%	Seats
Aleksandar Vučić—For Our Children (Serbian Progressive Party, Party of United Pensioners of Serbia)	4,641	52.24	19
Ivica Dačić–"Socialist Party of Serbia (SPS), United Serbia (JS)–Dragan Marković Palma"	1,936	21.79	8
Citizens' Group: Our People–Dr. Gordana Čabrić	1,242	13.98	5
Citizens' Group: Temnička Alternativa–Bratislav Petrović Baja	846	9.52	3
Citizens' Group: Serbian Radicals Varvarin	219	2.47	–
Total	8,884	100.00	35
Valid votes	8,884	96.03	
Invalid/blank votes	367	3.97	
Total votes	9,251	100.00	
Registered voters/turnout	15,426	59.97	

Violeta Lutovac Đurđević of the Serbian Progressive Party was chosen as mayor after the election. Lutovac Đurđević resigned as mayor on 30 October 2023 to prompt a new local election later in the year and was appointed as leader of a provisional authority.

==== Raška District ====
Local elections were held in the two cities (Kraljevo and Novi Pazar) and the three other municipalities of the Raška District. The Serbian Progressive Party and its allies won majority victories in the predominantly Serb municipalities of Kraljevo, Raška, and Vrnjačka Banja. The Sandžak Democratic Party won in the predominantly Bosniak city of Novi Pazar, while the Party of Democratic Action of Sandžak won in Tutin, also a predominantly Bosniak community.

===== Kraljevo =====
Results of the election for the City Assembly of Kraljevo:

Party	Votes	%	Seats
Aleksandar Vučić—For Our Children (Serbian Progressive Party, Social Democratic Party of Serbia, Party of United Pensioners of Serbia, Movement of Socialists, Serbian Renewal Movement)	27,539	59.13	46
Ivica Dačić–"Socialist Party of Serbia (SPS), United Serbia (JS)–Dragan Marković Palma"	7,194	15.45	12
Citizens' Group: METLA 2020–Longtime Residents–Ivan Matović	2,964	6.36	5
Milan Stamatović–Zoran Jovanović–Healthy Serbia–Movement for the Restoration of the Kingdom of Serbia–Better Serbia	2,669	5.73	4
Aleksandar Šapić–Victory for Kraljevo (Serbian Patriotic Alliance, Rusyn Democratic Party)	2,201	4.73	3
Courageously–Strahinja Erac–Serbian Party Oathkeepers	1,364	2.93	–
Dr. Vojislav Šešelj–Serbian Radical Party	1,153	2.48	–
People's Bloc–Velimir Ilić–Ljubiša Jovašević (New Serbia, People's Freedom Movement)	1,059	2.27	–
Serbian Right for Our Home Kraljevo Igor Mandić	434	0.93	–
Total	46,577	100.00	70
Valid votes	46,577	96.45	
Invalid/blank votes	1,714	3.55	
Total votes	48,291	100.00	
Registered voters/turnout	100,492	48.05	

Incumbent mayor Predrag Terzić of the Serbian Progressive Party was confirmed for another term in office after the election.

United Serbia parliamentarian Marija Jevđić was re-elected to the city assembly from the second position on the Socialist-led list.

Parliamentarian Vesna Nikolić Vukajlović led the Radical Party's list.

Predrag Terzić resigned on 30 October 2023 to prompt a new local election later in the year and was appointed as leader of a provisional authority.

===== Novi Pazar =====
Results of the election for the City Assembly of Novi Pazar:

Party	Votes	%	Seats
European Novi Pazar–Rasim Ljajić (Sandžak Democratic Party, Social Democratic Party of Serbia)	18,653	45.03	21
"Academic Muamer Zukorlić–Justice and Reconciliation Party (SPP)"	9,742	23.52	11
SDA Sandžak–Dr. Sulejman Ugljanin	7,716	18.63	9
Aleksandar Vučić, Ivica Dačić—For Our Children (SNS, SPS, SRS, PS, JS, SNP)	5,317	12.83	6
Total	41,428	100.00	47
Valid votes	41,428	97.77	
Invalid/blank votes	944	2.23	
Total votes	42,372	100.00	
Registered voters/turnout	87,589	48.38	

Incumbent mayor Nihat Biševac of the Sandžak Democratic Party was confirmed for another term in office after the election, leading a coalition government that also included the Serbian Progressive Party's alliance.

Candidates elected on the Justice and Reconciliation Party list included Amela Lukač Zoranić (list position #5) Jahja Fehratović (#6) and Misala Pramenković (#10). Fehratović resigned his seat on 21 December 2020.

The SDA list included Enis Imamović (#2) and Ahmedin Škrijelj (#3). Imamović resigned on 6 August 2021.

Biševac resigned as mayor on 30 October 2023 to prompt a new election later in the year and was appointed as leader of a provisional authority.

===== Raška =====
Results of the election for the Municipal Assembly of Raška:

Party	Votes	%	Seats
Aleksandar Vučić—For Our Children (Serbian Progressive Party, Party of United Pensioners of Serbia)	9,674	73.40	27
Ivica Dačić–"Socialist Party of Serbia (SPS), United Serbia (JS)–Dragan Marković Palma"	2,860	21.70	7
Dr. Vojislav Šešelj–Serbian Radical Party	645	4.89	1
Total	13,179	100.00	35
Valid votes	13,179	95.95	
Invalid/blank votes	556	4.05	
Total votes	13,735	100.00	
Registered voters/turnout	19,975	68.76	

Incumbent mayor Ignjat Rakitić of the Serbian Progressive Party was confirmed for another term in office after the election. He was dismissed from office in October 2022 following a mutiny in the Progressive Party and was replaced by fellow party member Nemanja Popović, who received the votes of thirty-one out of thirty-three delegates who were present.

===== Tutin =====
Results of the election for the Municipal Assembly of Tutin:

Party	Votes	%	Seats
SDA Sandžak–Dr. Sulejman Ugljanin	6,970	46.63	18
Justice and Reconciliation Party (SPP)–Academic Muamer Zukorlić	4,508	30.16	11
Tutin in First Place–Bajro Gegić	1,930	12.91	5
European Tutin–Rasim Ljajić (Sandžak Democratic Party, Social Democratic Party of Serbia)	1,036	6.93	2
Aleksandar Vučić—For Our Children (Serbian Progressive Party, Movement of Socialists)	502	3.36	1
Total	14,946	100.00	37
Valid votes	14,946	98.60	
Invalid/blank votes	212	1.40	
Total votes	15,158	100.00	
Registered voters/turnout	31,270	48.47	

Salih Hot of the Party of Democratic Action of Sandžak (SDA) was appointed as mayor after the election.

Zaim Redžepović was elected from the lead position on the Justice and Reconciliation Party list. Bajro Gegić was elected from the lead position on the "Tutin in First Place" list.

Salih Hot sought to resign as mayor in October 2023 in order for Tutin to participate in the off-year 2023 Serbian local elections, but he was advised that his resignation letter arrived too late. In January 2024, Hot was dismissed as mayor and Bajro Gegić was chosen as his replacement by a narrow majority. Gegić's election was supported by his own group as well as the Justice and Reconciliation Party (SPP), Sandžak Democratic Party (SDP), the Serbian Progressive Party (SNS), and a former SDA member. For the first time since 1996, the SDA moved into opposition in the municipality. The local SPP leadership clarified afterward that the party was not joining the government but had supported Gegić to remove the previous municipal leadership from power.

The SDA was able to form a new majority with two former SPP members in April 2024. Gegić was dismissed as mayor, and Refadija Ademović of the SDA was chosen in his place.

===== Vrnjačka Banja =====
Results of the election for the Municipal Assembly of Vrnjačka Banja:

Party	Votes	%	Seats
Aleksandar Vučić—For Our Children (Serbian Progressive Party, Movement of Socialists, Social Democratic Party of Serbia)	10,157	76.43	19
Ivica Dačić–"Socialist Party of Serbia (SPS), United Serbia (JS)–Dragan Marković Palma"	3,133	23.57	6
Total	13,290	100.00	25
Valid votes	13,290	94.51	
Invalid/blank votes	772	5.49	
Total votes	14,062	100.00	
Registered voters/turnout	23,602	59.58	

Incumbent mayor Boban Đurović of the Serbian Progressive Party was confirmed for another term in office after the election.

==== Šumadija District ====
Local elections were held in the one city (Kragujevac) and five of the six other municipalities of the Šumadija District. The exception was Aranđelovac, where the last election had been held in 2018.

The Progressive Party and its allies won in all jurisdictions that held elections except Topola, where Better Serbia won a narrow victory. The Progressives formed government in Topola after the election with support from smaller parties, but a political realignment in April 2021 brought Better Serbia back to power.

The only other jurisdiction where the Progressives did not win a majority was Batočina, where they fell one seat short.

===== Kragujevac =====
Results of the election for the City Assembly of Kragujevac:

Party	Votes	%	Seats
Aleksandar Vučić—For Our Children (Serbian Progressive Party, Social Democratic Party of Serbia, Party of United Pensioners of Serbia, Movement of Socialists, Strength of Serbia Movement, Strong Serbia)	33,256	47.29	46
Veroljub Verko Stenvanović—Everyone on This Side (ZS, SPO, BS)	12,884	18.32	17
Ivica Dačić–Socialist Party of Serbia (SPS), United Serbia (JS)–Dragan Marković Palma	6,748	9.60	9
Citizens' Group: 300 Kragujevac Citizens and I Love the Village Movement–Dušan Zeka Aleksić	3,776	5.37	5
Citizens' Group: Slađan Rakić–An Alternative–Kragujevac Initiative and New Strength–Eko Park	3,327	4.73	4
For the Kingdom of Serbia–Kragujevac My Capital City (Movement for the Restoration of the Kingdom of Serbia, Monarchist Front)	2,359	3.35	3
Kragujevac Heritage and Tolerance–Boris Kovačević Šuma (Party of Montenegrins, Bosniak Civic Party)	1,730	2.46	3
METLA 2000–Novica Antić (Democratic Party of Serbia, People's Strong Serbia)	1,620	2.30	–
Aleksandar Šapić–Victory for Kragujevac (Serbian Patriotic Alliance, Rusyn Democratic Party)	1,438	2.04	–
Citizens' Group: Deeds, Not Words–Dr. Vladica Stanojević	1,295	1.84	–
Dr. Vojislav Šešelj–Serbian Radical Party	530	0.75	–
Citizens' Group: Young Kragujevac Movement	490	0.70	–
Democratic Union of Roma–Milan Petrović Fafi	449	0.64	–
Russian Party–Vladimir Đorđević	422	0.60	–
Total	70,324	100.00	87
Valid votes	70,324	96.32	
Invalid/blank votes	2,684	3.68	
Total votes	73,008	100.00	
Registered voters/turnout	153,336	47.61	

Nikola Dašić of the Serbian Progressive Party was chosen as mayor after the election, with the support of seventy delegates.

Future parliamentarian Nikola Nešić, the leader of the local party New Strength (Nova Snaga), was re-elected from the second position on the independent "An Alternative" list. New Strength merged into Together for Serbia in 2021, and that party in turn merged into Together in 2022.

Mirko Čikiriz of the Movement for the Restoration of the Kingdom of Serbia was elected at the head of the For the Kingdom of Serbia list. He was subsequently appointed as an assistant mayor on 5 November 2020 with responsibility for co-operation with churches and religious communities. By virtue of holding this role, he resigned from the city assembly on 27 November.

Future parliamentarian Slađana Radisavljević of the Democratic Party of Serbia appeared in the fourth position on the METLA list. Military trade union official Novica Antić, who entered political life in an individual capacity, received the largely symbolic twenty-ninth position out of thirty on the same list.

Nikola Dašić resigned as mayor on 30 October 2023 to prompt a new election later in the year and was appointed as leader of a provisional authority.

===== Aranđelovac =====
There was no municipal election in Aranđelovac in 2020. The previous election had taken place in 2018, and the next election took place in 2022.

===== Batočina =====
Results of the election for the Municipal Assembly of Batočina:

Party	Votes	%	Seats
Aleksandar Vučić—For Our Children (Serbian Progressive Party, Strength of Serbia Movement, Social Democratic Party of Serbia)	2,928	44.16	14
Citizens' Group: "Freedom"	1,296	19.54	6
Citizens' Group: Let's Cure the Municipality	819	12.35	4
Ivica Dačić–"Socialist Party of Serbia (SPS), United Serbia (JS)–Dragan Marković Palma"	637	9.61	3
"Together for Batočina–Veroljub Verko Stenvanović (ZS, BS, SPO)	331	4.99	1
Citizens' Group: Batočina–Our Home	280	4.22	1
For the Kingdom of Serbia–Dragan Jocić (Movement for the Restoration of the Kingdom of Serbia, Monarchist Front)	185	2.79	–
Party of United Pensioners of Serbia–Milan Krkobabić	155	2.34	–
Total	6,631	100.00	29
Valid votes	6,631	96.42	
Invalid/blank votes	246	3.58	
Total votes	6,877	100.00	
Registered voters/turnout	9,889	69.54	

Incumbent mayor Zdravko Mladenović of the Serbian Progressive Party was confirmed for another term in office after the election. Mladenović resigned on 30 October 2023 to prompt a new election later in the year; a provisional administration was established with Dejan Aranđelović, also of the Progressive Party, as its leader.

===== Knić =====
Results of the election for the Municipal Assembly of Knić:

Party	Votes	%	Seats
Aleksandar Vučić—For Our Children (Serbian Progressive Party)	4,778	72.96	19
Ivica Dačić–Socialist Party of Serbia (SPS), United Serbia (JS)–Dragan Marković Palma	808	12.34	3
Citizens' Group: Truman	622	9.50	2
Velimir Ilić–New Serbia–Patriotic Blok (New Serbia, People's Freedom Movement)	341	5.21	1
Total	6,549	100.00	25
Valid votes	6,549	95.93	
Invalid/blank votes	278	4.07	
Total votes	6,827	100.00	
Registered voters/turnout	10,741	63.56	

Srećko Ilić of the Serbian Progressive Party was chosen as mayor after the election. Ilić resigned on 30 October 2023 to prompt a new election later in the year and was appointed as leader of a provisional authority.

===== Lapovo =====
Results of the election for the Municipal Assembly of Lapovo:

Party	Votes	%	Seats
Aleksandar Vučić—For Our Children (Serbian Progressive Party, Party of United Pensioners of Serbia, Social Democratic Party of Serbia, Strength of Serbia Movement)	2,540	65.16	16
"All for Lapovo–SPO–Saša Nikolić"	398	10.21	2
Ivica Dačić–"Socialist Party of Serbia (SPS)"	340	8.72	2
Dr. Vojislav Šešelj–Serbian Radical Party	267	6.85	1
Citizens' Group: Ecological Movement of Lapovo–For a Cleaner Lapovo–Pucko	148	3.80	–
For the Kingdom of Serbia–Dragan Zlatković–Our People (Movement for the Restoration of the Kingdom of Serbia, Monarchist Front)	113	2.90	–
Citizens' Group: For the Life of Lapovo	92	2.36	–
Total	3,898	100.00	21
Valid votes	3,898	96.34	
Invalid/blank votes	148	3.66	
Total votes	4,046	100.00	
Registered voters/turnout	6,718	60.23	

Incumbent mayor Boban Miličić of the Serbian Progressive Party was confirmed for another term in office after the election. Miličić resigned on 30 October 2023 to prompt a new election later in the year and was appointed as leader of a provisional authority.

===== Rača =====
Results of the election for the Municipal Assembly of Rača:

Party	Votes	%	Seats
Aleksandar Vučić—For Our Children (Serbian Progressive Party, Social Democratic Party of Serbia, Party of United Pensioners of Serbia, Strength of Serbia Movement, Liberal Democratic Party)	4,969	80.88	23
Ivica Dačić–"Socialist Party of Serbia (SPS), United Serbia (JS)–Dragan Marković Palma"	745	12.13	3
Coalition: Consistently for Rača (Better Serbia, Serbian Radical Party, Democratic Party of Serbia, Healthy Serbia)	430	7.00	1
Total	6,144	100.00	27
Valid votes	6,144	96.21	
Invalid/blank votes	242	3.79	
Total votes	6,386	100.00	
Registered voters/turnout	9,318	68.53	

Incumbent mayor Nenad Savković of the Serbian Progressive Party was confirmed for another term in office after the election. Savković resigned on 30 October 2023 to prompt a new election later in the year and was appointed as leader of a provisional authority.

===== Topola =====
Results of the election for the Municipal Assembly of Topola:

Party	Votes	%	Seats
Dragan Jovanović—Let's Help Dragan–Hello to Win–Better Serbia	4,023	36.28	16
Aleksandar Vučić—For Our Children (Serbian Progressive Party, Party of United Pensioners of Serbia, Strength of Serbia Movement, Serbian Renewal Movement, Serbian People's Party)	3,831	34.54	15
Citizens' Group: New People for a Better Topola–Mirko Jevtić–We Know Each Other!	1,648	14.86	6
Ivica Dačić–"Socialist Party of Serbia (SPS), United Serbia (JS)–Dragan Marković Palma"	935	8.43	3
For the Kingdom of Serbia–For a Flourishing Topola (Movement for the Restoration of the Kingdom of Serbia, Monarchist Front)	398	3.59	1
New Serbia	255	2.30	–
Total	11,090	100.00	41
Valid votes	11,090	96.66	
Invalid/blank votes	383	3.34	
Total votes	11,473	100.00	
Registered voters/turnout	18,153	63.20	

Igor Petrović of the Progressive Party was selected as mayor after the election, with support from the Socialists and the "New People" list. Dragan Jovanović was elected from the lead position on the Better Serbia list and initially served as leader of the opposition in the assembly.

Jovanović was expelled from the assembly in November 2020, on the grounds that he had changed his residence from Topola to Belgrade and was no longer on the local voters list. He responded that this decision was based on falsified information and that he had actually been expelled for being a "thorn in the side" of the local authorities.

Two members of the local Progressives subsequently left the party's assembly group, and a new majority was established in April 2021 by Better Serbia, with support from the Movement for the Restoration of the Kingdom of Serbia, the Serbian People's Party, and the Party of United Pensioners of Serbia. Igor Petrović left the Progressives to join Healthy Serbia and initially continued to serve as mayor. Dragan Jovanović was appointed to the city council with responsibility for infrastructure and the economy.

In March 2022, Petrović was replaced as mayor by Vladimir Radojković of Better Serbia.

Dragan Jovanović stood down from city council on 10 September 2022, having by this time been re-elected to the national assembly.

Better Serbia merged into the Progressive Party in April 2023.

Vladimir Radojković resigned as mayor on 30 October 2023 to prompt a new election later in the year. Dragan Jovanović was appointed as leader of a provisional authority.

==== Zlatibor District ====
Local elections were held in the one city (i.e., Užice) and eight of the nine separate municipalities of the Zlatibor District. The exception was Kosjerić, where the previous local election had taken place in 2017.

The Serbian Progressive Party's coalition won majority victories in Užice, Bajina Bašta, Nova Varoš, Požega, and Priboj. It also won plurality victories in Arilje and Prijepolje; in both of these areas, a representative of the Progressive Party was subsequently chosen as mayor. Healthy Serbia leader Milan Stamatović led his coalition to a majority victory in Čajetina, and in Sjenica the Justice and Reconciliation Party formed government in an alliance with the Progressives.

The city of Užice is divided into two municipalities: Užice and Sevojno. The municipality of Užice does not have direct assembly elections: members of the city assembly also serve at the municipal level. Delegates to the Municipal Assembly of Sevojno are directly elected, although there was no election in 2020; the previous vote had taken place in 2018.

===== Užice =====
Results of the election for the City Assembly of Užice:

Party	Votes	%	Seats
Aleksandar Vučić—For Our Children (Serbian Progressive Party, Social Democratic Party of Serbia, Party of United Pensioners of Serbia, Strength of Serbia Movement, Serbian People's Party, Movement for the Restoration of the Kingdom of Serbia)	17,672	56.38	41
Milan Stamatović–Healthy Serbia	6,828	21.78	15
"Ivica Dačić–Socialist Party of Serbia (SPS), United Serbia (JS)–Dragan Marković Palma"	3,168	10.11	7
Aleksandar Šapić–Victory for Užice (Serbian Patriotic Alliance, Rusyn Democratic Party)	1,190	3.80	2
Citizens' Group: Užice Defense League–Mihailo Krstić–Let's Clean Up Užice	1,048	3.34	2
Užice METLA for a Healthy Serbia (Democratic Party of Serbia, People's Strong Serbia)	934	2.98	–
Dr. Vojislav Šešelj–Serbian Radical Party	507	1.62	–
Total	31,347	100.00	67
Valid votes	31,347	97.27	
Invalid/blank votes	879	2.73	
Total votes	32,226	100.00	
Registered voters/turnout	65,701	49.05	

Jelena Raković Radivojević of the Serbian Progressive Party was chosen as mayor after the election.

====== Užice: Sevojno ======
There was no election for the Municipal Assembly of Sevojno in 2020. The previous election had taken place in 2018, and the next election took place in the 2022.

===== Arilje =====
Results of the election for the Municipal Assembly of Arilje:

Party	Votes	%	Seats
Aleksandar Vučić—For Our Children (Serbian Progressive Party, Party of United Pensioners of Serbia)	3,684	44.80	16
SNP–Dragiša Terzić and Social Democratic Party of Serbia–Radan Marjanović	987	12.00	4
Milan Stamatović–Healthy Serbia for a Healthy Arilje	954	11.60	4
Aleksandar Šapić–Victory for Arilje (Serbian Patriotic Alliance, Rusyn Democratic Party)	618	7.51	2
For the Kingdom of Serbia–For a Better Arilje (Movement for the Restoration of the Kingdom of Serbia, Monarchist Front)–Branko Vukajlović	527	6.41	2
Ivica Dačić–"Socialist Party of Serbia (SPS), United Serbia (JS)–Dragan Marković Palma"	486	5.91	2
Zoran Todorović–For Our Arilje and the Home Village	337	4.10	1
Dr. Vojislav Šešelj–Serbian Radical Party	316	3.84	1
Citizens' Group: Arilje Youth Movement–Quiet Heroes	315	3.83	1
Total	8,224	100.00	33
Valid votes	8,224	95.97	
Invalid/blank votes	345	4.03	
Total votes	8,569	100.00	
Registered voters/turnout	15,428	55.54	

Predrag Maslar of the Serbian Progressive Party was chosen as mayor after the election.

===== Bajina Bašta =====
Results of the election for the Municipal Assembly of Bajina Bašta:

Party	Votes	%	Seats
Aleksandar Vučić—For Our Children (Serbian Progressive Party, Social Democratic Party of Serbia, Party of United Pensioners of Serbia)	7,679	64.13	30
Ivica Dačić–"Socialist Party of Serbia (SPS), United Serbia (JS)"–Dragan Marković Palma"	2,308	19.27	9
Dr. Vojislav Šešelj–Serbian Radical Party	696	5.81	2
Aleksandar Šapić–Victory for Bajina Bašta (Serbian Patriotic Alliance, Rusyn Democratic Party)	665	5.55	2
Serbian People's Party Aleksandar Aksentijević	627	5.24	2
Total	11,975	100.00	45
Valid votes	11,975	95.12	
Invalid/blank votes	614	4.88	
Total votes	12,589	100.00	
Registered voters/turnout	21,431	58.74	

Vesna Đurić of the Serbian Progressive Party was chosen as mayor after the election. She resigned in January 2022, prompting a new local election later that year, and was appointed as the leader of a provisional administration.

===== Čajetina =====
Results of the election for the Municipal Assembly of Čajetina:

Party	Votes	%	Seats
Milan Stamatović–Healthy Serbia–Democratic Party of Serbia–Party of United Pensioners of Serbia	5,231	62.23	20
Aleksandar Vučić—For Our Children (Serbian Progressive Party, Serbian Radical Party)	2,278	27.10	8
Ivica Dačić–"Socialist Party of Serbia (SPS)"	509	6.06	2
For the Kingdom of Serbia–Aleksandar Pavlović (Movement for the Restoration of the Kingdom of Serbia–Monarchist Front)	388	4.62	1
Total	8,406	100.00	31
Valid votes	8,406	97.22	
Invalid/blank votes	240	2.78	
Total votes	8,646	100.00	
Registered voters/turnout	12,916	66.94	

Incumbent mayor Milan Stamatović, the leader of Healthy Serbia, was confirmed for another term in office after the election.

Bojana Božanić of Healthy Serbia was elected from the fourth position on the Healthy Serbia–Democratic Party of Serbia list. She resigned shortly after the new assembly was convened.

Đorđe Dabić was re-elected from the third position on the Progressive Party's list.

===== Kosjerić =====
There was no municipal election in Kosjerić in 2020. The previous election had taken place in 2017, and the next election took place in 2021.

===== Nova Varoš =====
Results of the election for the Municipal Assembly of Nova Varoš:

Party	Votes	%	Seats
Aleksandar Vučić—For Our Children (Serbian Progressive Party, Sandžak Democratic Party, Movement of Socialists)	4,933	54.06	16
Ivica Dačić–"Socialist Party of Serbia" (SPS)	1,381	15.13	4
"Dimitrije Paunović–Survival–Because We Can Do Better	1,181	12.94	4
For a Better Nova Varoš, Nikola Jelić	494	5.41	1
Healthy Serbia, Milan Stamatović	446	4.89	1
Serbian People's Party–Dušan Matović	336	3.68	1
Dr. Vojislav Šešelj–Serbian Radical Party	185	2.03	–
Matijević Dragan Ðoza–Serbian Right for Nova Varoš	169	1.85	–
Total	9,125	100.00	27
Valid votes	9,125	96.67	
Invalid/blank votes	314	3.33	
Total votes	9,439	100.00	
Registered voters/turnout	13,193	71.55	

Incumbent mayor Radosav Vasiljević from the New People for Nova Varoš citizens' group was confirmed for another term in office after the election. New People for Nova Varoš was part of the Serbian Progressive Party's alliance, and its delegates in the municipal assembly were elected with endorsements from the Progressives.

===== Požega =====
Results of the election for the Municipal Assembly of Požega:

Party	Votes	%	Seats
Aleksandar Vučić—For Our Children (Serbian Progressive Party, Party of United Pensioners of Serbia)	6,799	56.86	32
Ivica Dačić–"Socialist Party of Serbia" (SPS), United Serbia (JS)–Dragan Marković Palma	2,172	18.17	10
Healthy Serbia	1,033	8.64	4
Strength of Serbia Movement–BK	843	7.05	3
Citizens' Group: Požega Wins Borko Boća Matijević	795	6.65	3
Serbian Radical Party	315	2.63	–
Total	11,957	100.00	52
Valid votes	11,957	95.73	
Invalid/blank votes	533	4.27	
Total votes	12,490	100.00	
Registered voters/turnout	23,758	52.57	

Incumbent mayor Đorđe Nikitović of the Serbian Progressive Party was confirmed for another term in office after the election.

Nikitović submitted his resignation on 28 September 2023 in order for the municipality to participate in the early 2023 Serbian local elections. He was appointed afterward as leader of a provisional authority.

===== Priboj =====
Results of the election for the Municipal Assembly of Priboj:

Party	Votes	%	Seats
Aleksandar Vučić, Ivica Dačić—For Our Children (Serbian Progressive Party, Socialist Party of Serbia, Serbian Radical Party, Movement of Socialists, Party of United Pensioners of Serbia, Strength of Serbia Movement)	8,698	65.56	28
Healthy Serbia–Milan Stamatović	1,541	11.61	5
The Best for Priboj SDP-LDP Dr. Jasminko Toskić, Jasmin Hodžić	1,050	7.91	3
SDA Sandžak–Dr. Sulejman Ugljanin	807	6.08	2
Academic Muamer Zukorlić–Justice and Reconciliation Party (SPP)	771	5.81	2
For the Kingdom of Serbia–For the Acquisition of True Values–Miloš Parandilović (Movement for the Restoration of the Kingdom of Serbia, Monarchist Front)	401	3.02	1
Total	13,268	100.00	41
Valid votes	13,268	97.24	
Invalid/blank votes	377	2.76	
Total votes	13,645	100.00	
Registered voters/turnout	27,535	49.56	

Incumbent mayor Lazar Rvović of the Serbian Progressive Party was confirmed for another term in office after the election.

Rvović submitted his resignation on 28 September 2023 in order for the municipality to participate in the early 2023 Serbian local elections. He was appointed afterward as leader of a provisional authority.

===== Prijepolje =====
Results of the election for the Municipal Assembly of Prijepolje:

Party	Votes	%	Seats
Aleksandar Vučić, Ivica Dačić—For Our Children (Serbian Progressive Party, Socialist Party of Serbia)	6,631	34.08	16
Together for Prijepolje–Rasim Ljajić (Sandžak Democratic Party, Social Democratic Party of Serbia, Liberal Democratic Party)	4,391	22.57	11
Academic Muamer Zukorlić–Justice and Reconciliation Party SPP	3,209	16.49	8
DPS Dr. Zulkefil Bato Sadović (Democratic Party of the Sandžak)	1,575	8.09	3
Citizens' Movement: For a Clean Prijepolje	792	4.07	1
SDA Sandžak–Dr. Sulejman Ugljanin	765	3.93	1
Citizens' Group: For a Better Prijepolje–Lutka	651	3.35	1
For the Kingdom of Serbia–Love, Faith, Hope–Babič Ljubiša Čuveni (Movement for the Restoration of the Kingdom of Serbia, Monarchist Front)	527	2.71	–
Healthy Serbia Milan Stamatović	499	2.56	–
Milan Gačević–People's Blok (New Serbia, People's Freedom Movement)	335	1.72	–
Better Serbia Igor Ninčić	82	0.42	–
Total	19,457	100.00	41
Valid votes	19,457	97.42	
Invalid/blank votes	515	2.58	
Total votes	19,972	100.00	
Registered voters/turnout	33,164	60.22	

Vladimir Babić of the Serbian Progressive Party was chosen as mayor following the election. He was replaced by fellow Progressive Party member Drago Popadić in February 2023.

Popadić submitted his resignation on 28 September 2023 in order for the municipality to participate in the early 2023 Serbian local elections. Izudin Santić of the Sandžak Democratic Party was appointed afterward as leader of a provisional authority.

Samir Tandir was elected from the lead position on the Justice and Reconciliation Party list. He left the party in May 2022, bringing the rest of its local assembly delegation with him.

===== Sjenica =====
Results of the election for the Municipal Assembly of Sjenica:

Party	Votes	%	Seats
SDA Sandžak–Dr. Sulejman Ugljanin	3,512	25.28	10
Muamer Zukorlić–Justice and Reconciliation Party (SPP)	3,019	21.73	9
European Sjenica–Rasim Ljajić (Sandžak Democratic Party, Social Democratic Party of Serbia)	2,364	17.01	7
Aleksandar Vučić—For Our Children (Serbian Progressive Party, Movement for the Restoration of the Kingdom of Serbia, Party of United Pensioners of Serbia, Strength of Serbia Movement, Movement of Socialists, Serbian Radical Party)	1,933	13.91	5
Citizen's Group: Without Discrimination–Aldin Dino Kurtović	1,641	11.81	5
Ivica Dačić–Socialist Party of Serbia (SPS)	888	6.39	2
Citizens' Group: Together	538	3.87	1
Total	13,895	100.00	39
Valid votes	13,895	97.37	
Invalid/blank votes	375	2.63	
Total votes	14,270	100.00	
Registered voters/turnout	26,793	53.26	

Munib Mujagić of the Justice and Reconciliation Party (SPP) was chosen as mayor after the election. Rejhan Kurtović, also of the SPP, was chosen as assembly president. The government was supported by the Serbian Progressive Party (SNS), the Socialist Party of Serbia (SPS), and the two citizens' groups.

In October 2020, a new coalition of the Party of Democratic Action of Sandžak (SDA), the Sandžak Democratic Party (SDP), and the Progressives established an apparent working majority after the municipality's election commission awarded a new mandate to the SDA. The new alliance controversially held an assembly meeting (not attended by the other delegates) that dismissed Mujagić and elected Nermin Kamberović of the SDP as mayor. The election commission's decision was later overturned in the courts, the election of Kamberović as mayor was invalidated, and the SPP-led coalition was able to remain in power.

The SDP joined the municipal governing coalition in September 2022. Kurtović resigned as assembly president and was replaced by Kamberović. Kurtović later resigned from the assembly on 15 December 2022, having been appointed as a secretary of state in Serbia's government.

Mujagić was removed as mayor in November 2023. Kamberović was chosen as his replacement later in the month, heading a new administration that included the SDP, the SDA, two independent delegates, and four members of the recently formed Party for the Future and Development.

Mirsad Hodžić was elected to the assembly from the lead position on the SDA Sandžak list. He resigned his seat on 11 June 2021.

=== Southern and Eastern Serbia ===
==== Bor District ====
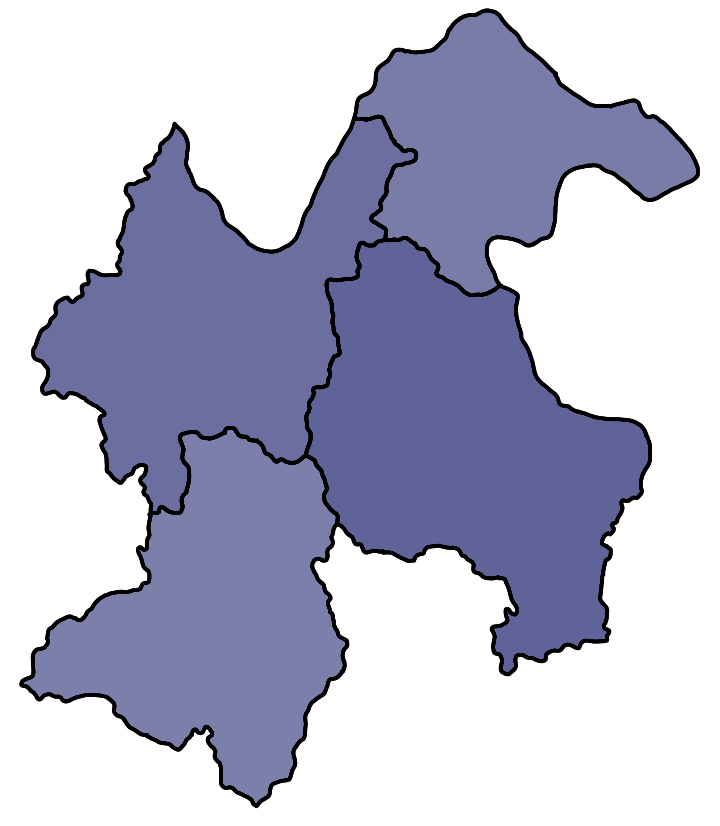
Results of local elections in Bor by municipality

Local elections were held in all 4 municipalities of Bor District.

===== Bor =====
Party	Votes	%	Seats
SNS-SPS coalition	13,918	60.20	24
NS-DS-VNS-ZZS-DSS-SDS coalition	3,919	16.95	7
Group of citizens (total)	3,606	15.60	3
Vlach Party "Most"	954	4.13	1
SRS-USS coalition	505	2.18	–
Republican Party - Republikanus part	218	0.94	–
Total	23,120	100.00	35
Valid votes	23,120	97.24	
Invalid/blank votes	657	2.76	
Total votes	23,777	100.00	
Source: Republika Srbija - Republički zavod za statistiku - Lokalni izbori Republika Srbija 2020. Bureau of Statistics, Republic of Serbia; p. 59

===== Kladovo =====
Party	Votes	%	Seats
SNS-SDPS coalition	5,672	61.33	18
SPS-JS coalition	2,863	30.96	9
Party of United Pensioners of Serbia	511	5.53	1
Serbian Radical Party	202	2.18	–
Total	9,248	100.00	28
Valid votes	9,248	95.01	
Invalid/blank votes	486	4.99	
Total votes	9,734	100.00	
Source: Republika Srbija - Republički zavod za statistiku - Lokalni izbori Republika Srbija 2020. Bureau of Statistics, Republic of Serbia; p. 59

===== Majdanpek =====
Party	Votes	%	Seats
SNS-PSS-BK coalition	6,562	67.82	24
Dveri	1,096	11.33	4
SPS-JS coalition	962	9.94	3
Group of citizens - total	422	4.36	–
Party of United Pensioners of Serbia	290	3.00	–
Vlach Party "Most"	232	2.40	–
Vlach Party	111	1.15	–
Total	9,675	100.00	31
Valid votes	9,675	96.49	
Invalid/blank votes	352	3.51	
Total votes	10,027	100.00	
Source: Republika Srbija - Republički zavod za statistiku - Lokalni izbori Republika Srbija 2020. Bureau of Statistics, Republic of Serbia; p. 59

===== Negotin =====
Party	Votes	%	Seats
SNS-SPS coalition	10,569	72.91	36
Democratic Party	2,787	19.23	9
Group of citizens - total	603	4.16	–
United Peasant Party	536	3.70	–
Total	14,495	100.00	45
Valid votes	14,495	97.48	
Invalid/blank votes	375	2.52	
Total votes	14,870	100.00	
Source: Republika Srbija - Republički zavod za statistiku - Lokalni izbori Republika Srbija 2020. Bureau of Statistics, Republic of Serbia; p. 59

==== Braničevo District ====
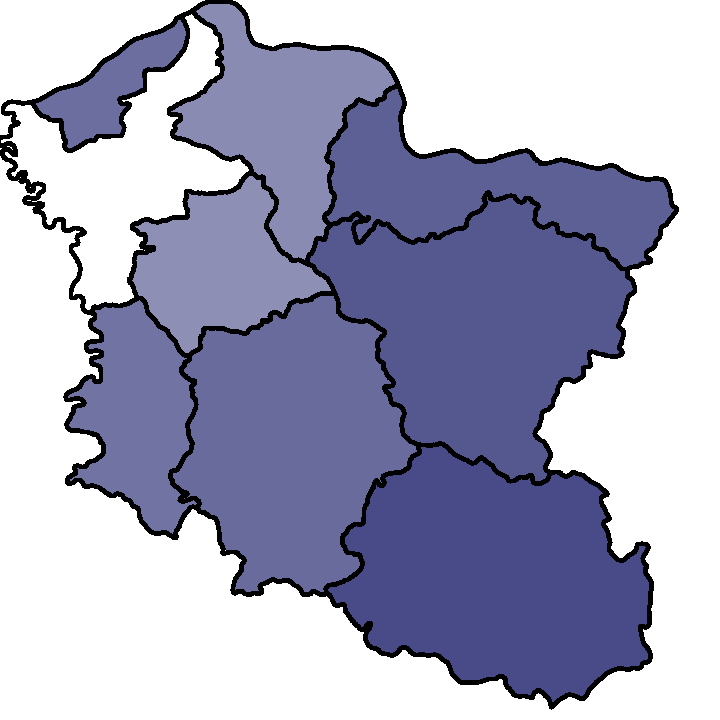
Results of local elections in Braničevo by municipality

Local elections were held in all 9 municipalities of Braničevo District, including the City of Požarevac.

===== City of Požarevac =====
Party	Votes	%	Seats
SNS-PUPS coalition	4,081	68.22	16
SPS-JS coalition	1,011	16.90	4
Group of citizens - total	579	9.68	1
Serbian Radical Party	114	1.91	–
Vlach Party "Most"	109	1.82	–
DPM-SPP coalition	88	1.47	–
Total	5,982	100.00	21
Valid votes	5,982	95.24	
Invalid/blank votes	299	4.76	
Total votes	6,281	100.00	
Source: Republika Srbija - Republički zavod za statistiku - Lokalni izbori Republika Srbija 2020. Bureau of Statistics, Republic of Serbia; p. 59-60

===== Kostolac (City of Požarevac) =====
Party	Votes	%	Seats
SNS-PUPS coalition	4,081	68.22	16
SPS-JS coalition	1,011	16.90	4
Group of citizens - total	579	9.68	1
Serbian Radical Party	114	1.91	–
Vlach Party "Most"	109	1.82	–
DPM-SPP coalition	88	1.47	–
Total	5,982	100.00	21
Valid votes	5,982	95.24	
Invalid/blank votes	299	4.76	
Total votes	6,281	100.00	
Source: Republika Srbija - Republički zavod za statistiku - Lokalni izbori Republika Srbija 2020. Bureau of Statistics, Republic of Serbia; p. 60

===== Veliko Gradište =====
Party	Votes	%	Seats
SNS-SDPS coalition	4,530	53.59	21
Group of citizens - total	1,257	14.87	5
Socialist Party of Serbia	1,151	13.62	5
Serbian Renewal Movement	540	6.39	2
Green Party	424	5.02	1
United Serbia	379	4.48	1
Serbian Radical Party	172	2.03	–
Total	8,453	100.00	35
Valid votes	8,453	96.41	
Invalid/blank votes	315	3.59	
Total votes	8,768	100.00	
Source: Republika Srbija - Republički zavod za statistiku - Lokalni izbori Republika Srbija 2020. Bureau of Statistics, Republic of Serbia; p. 60

===== Golubac =====
Party	Votes	%	Seats
SNS-SPS-PUPS coalition	3,639	74.22	15
Group of citizens - total	1,162	23.70	4
Serbian Radical Party	102	2.08	–
Total	4,903	100.00	19
Valid votes	4,903	97.03	
Invalid/blank votes	150	2.97	
Total votes	5,053	100.00	
Source: Republika Srbija - Republički zavod za statistiku - Lokalni izbori Republika Srbija 2020. Bureau of Statistics, Republic of Serbia; p. 60

===== Žabari =====
Party	Votes	%	Seats
SNS-PS coalition	3,802	64.85	26
Group of citizens - total	973	16.60	5
Socialist Party of Serbia	858	14.63	5
Better Serbia	230	3.92	1
Total	5,863	100.00	37
Valid votes	5,863	97.13	
Invalid/blank votes	173	2.87	
Total votes	6,036	100.00	
Source: Republika Srbija - Republički zavod za statistiku - Lokalni izbori Republika Srbija 2020. Bureau of Statistics, Republic of Serbia; p. 60

===== Žagubica =====
Party	Votes	%	Seats
SNS-PUPS-PS-PSS-BK coalition	6,093	84.30	22
SPS-JS coalition	945	13.07	3
Serbian Radical Party	190	2.63	–
Total	7,228	100.00	25
Valid votes	7,228	96.17	
Invalid/blank votes	288	3.83	
Total votes	7,516	100.00	
Source: Republika Srbija - Republički zavod za statistiku - Lokalni izbori Republika Srbija 2020. Bureau of Statistics, Republic of Serbia; p. 60

===== Kučevo =====
Party	Votes	%	Seats
SNS-PS coalition	5,953	77.86	35
Socialist Party of Serbia	951	12.44	5
JS-VNS coalition	439	5.74	2
Vlach Party "Most"	303	3.96	1
Total	7,646	100.00	43
Valid votes	7,646	95.80	
Invalid/blank votes	335	4.20	
Total votes	7,981	100.00	
Source: Republika Srbija - Republički zavod za statistiku - Lokalni izbori Republika Srbija 2020. Bureau of Statistics, Republic of Serbia; p. 60

===== Malo Crniće =====
Party	Votes	%	Seats
SNS-PS coalition	2,875	51.65	16
Group of citizens - total	1,745	31.35	8
SPS-JS coalition	946	17.00	5
Total	5,566	100.00	29
Valid votes	5,566	96.62	
Invalid/blank votes	195	3.38	
Total votes	5,761	100.00	
Source: Republika Srbija - Republički zavod za statistiku - Lokalni izbori Republika Srbija 2020. Bureau of Statistics, Republic of Serbia; p. 60

===== Petrovac na Mlavi =====
Party	Votes	%	Seats
SNS-PS-PUPS coalition	11,331	69.35	50
SPS-JS coalition	2,952	18.07	9
Group of citizens - total	1,554	9.51	4
Vlach Party "Most"	501	3.07	2
Total	16,338	100.00	65
Valid votes	16,338	96.93	
Invalid/blank votes	517	3.07	
Total votes	16,855	100.00	
Source: Republika Srbija - Republički zavod za statistiku - Lokalni izbori Republika Srbija 2020. Bureau of Statistics, Republic of Serbia; p. 60

==== Nišava District ====
Local elections were held for the City Assembly of Niš, the assemblies in all five of Niš's constituent municipalities, and the assemblies in five of the Nišava District's other six municipalities. The exception was Doljevac, where the last municipal election had been held in 2018.

The Progressive Party and its allies won majority victories in jurisdictions except Ražanj, where an independent list led by the incumbent mayor Dobrica Stojković won a plurality victory. Stojković was confirmed for another term in office following the election; in November 2021, he and his assembly group joined the Progressives.

A delegate from the United Peasant Party (aligned with the Progressives) was chosen as mayor in the party's home territory of Svrljig.

===== Niš =====
Results of the election for the City Assembly of Niš:

Party	Votes	%	Seats
Aleksandar Vučić—For Our Children (Serbian Progressive Party, Social Democratic Party of Serbia, Party of United Pensioners of Serbia, Movement of Socialists, Independents)	59,583	60.25	47
Ivica Dačić–"Socialist Party of Serbia (SPS), United Serbia (JS)–Dragan Marković Palma"	8,603	8.70	6
Niš, My City–Dragoljub Ćirković	4,973	5.03	4
Aleksandar Šapić–Victory for Niš (Serbian Patriotic Alliance, Rusyn Democratic Party)	4,929	4.98	3
"Sovereigntists" (Enough Is Enough)	2,793	2.82	–
METLA 2020–Living Wall (Democratic Party of Serbia, People's Strong Serbia)	2,475	2.50	–
Sergej Trifunović–Movement of Free Citizens	2,298	2.32	–
We Don't Give Up Niš–Bojan Avramović	2,124	2.15	–
Dr. Vojislav Šešelj–Serbian Radical Party	2,011	2.03	–
United Peasant Party–Milija Miletić	1,997	2.02	–
Russian Party	1,745	1.76	1
For the Kingdom of Serbia–All for Niš (Movement for the Restoration of the Kingdom of Serbia, Monarchist Front)	1,693	1.71	–
Milica Đurđević Stamenkovski–Serbian Party Oathkeepers	1,611	1.63	–
People's Blok–Honestly for Niš–General Momir Stojanović (New Serbia, People's Freedom Movement)	1,230	1.24	–
Tolerance for Niš–Mića Jevtić (Party of Montenegrins, Bosniak Civic Party)	425	0.43	–
Citizens' Group: Serbian Right for Our Home Niš–Suzana Stamenković	396	0.40	–
Total	98,886	100.00	61
Valid votes	98,886	96.63	
Invalid/blank votes	3,446	3.37	
Total votes	102,332	100.00	
Registered voters/turnout	231,126	44.28	

Dragana Sotirovski of the Progressive Party was chosen as mayor after the election, with the support of fifty-six out of sixty-one delegates.

Momir Stojanović, the leader of the local Honestly for Niš party, appeared in the first position on the People's Blok list.

====== Niš: Crveni Krst ======
Results of the election for the Municipal Assembly of Crveni Krst:

Party	Votes	%	Seats
Aleksandar Vučić—For Our Children (Serbian Progressive Party, Movement of Socialists, Party of United Pensioners of Serbia)	9,828	67.40	17
Ivica Dačić–"Socialist Party of Serbia (SPS), United Serbia (JS)–Dragan Marković Palma"	1,132	7.76	2
Niš, My City–Our Crveni Krst	1,101	7.55	1
Aleksandar Šapić–Victory for Niš (Serbian Patriotic Alliance, Rusyn Democratic Party)	816	5.60	1
United Peasant Party–Milija Miletić	531	3.64	–
Dr. Vojislav Šešelj–Serbian Radical Party	496	3.40	–
Ne Damo Niš–Bojan Avramović	455	3.12	–
Russian Party–Milan Krstić	222	1.52	–
Total	14,581	100.00	21
Valid votes	14,581	96.18	
Invalid/blank votes	579	3.82	
Total votes	15,160	100.00	
Registered voters/turnout	29,866	50.76	

Incumbent mayor Miroslav Milutinović of the Progressive Party was confirmed for another term in office after the election, with the support of twenty out of twenty-one delegates.

====== Niš: Medijana ======
Results of the election for the Municipal Assembly of Medijana:

Party	Votes	%	Seats
Aleksandar Vučić—For Our Children (Serbian Progressive Party, Social Democratic Party of Serbia, Party of United Pensioners of Serbia)	16,306	54.48	17
Ivica Dačić–"Socialist Party of Serbia (SPS), United Serbia (JS)–Dragan Marković Palma"	3,264	10.91	3
Niš, My City–Dragoljub Ćirković	2,229	7.45	2
Aleksandar Šapić–Victory for Niš (Serbian Patriotic Alliance, Rusyn Democratic Party)	1,840	6.15	1
"Sovereigntists" (Enough Is Enough)	1,226	4.10	1
METLA 2020–Living Wall (Democratic Party of Serbia, People's Strong Serbia)	1,018	3.40	1
Sergej Trifunović–Movement of Free Citizens	984	3.29	1
Ne Damo Niš–Bojan Avramović	790	2.64	–
Russian Party–Milan Krstić	720	2.41	1
United Peasant Party–Milija Miletić	459	1.53	–
People's Blok–Honestly for Niš–General Momir Stojanović (New Serbia, People's Freedom Movement)	438	1.46	–
Dr. Vojislav Šešelj–Serbian Radical Party	425	1.42	–
Citizens' Group: Serbian Right for Our Home Medijana–Dejan Rajković	229	0.77	–
Total	29,928	100.00	27
Valid votes	29,928	97.81	
Invalid/blank votes	671	2.19	
Total votes	30,599	100.00	
Registered voters/turnout	76,168	40.17	

Incumbent mayor Nebojša Kocić of the Progressive Party was confirmed for another term in office after the election, with the support of twenty-one delegates.

====== Niš: Niška Banja ======
Results of the election for the Municipal Assembly of Niška Banja:

Party	Votes	%	Seats
Aleksandar Vučić—For Our Children (Serbian Progressive Party, Social Democratic Party of Serbia, Party of United Pensioners of Serbia)	3,375	49.38	11
United Serbia (JS)–Dragan Marković Palma–Domaćinski	865	12.66	2
Ivica Dačić–"Socialist Party of Serbia (SPS)"	758	11.09	2
Nova Banja–Association of Free and Dissatisfied Citizens of the Municipality of Niška Banja–Miloš Milenković	750	10.97	2
Russian Party–Bojan Stanisavljević	594	8.69	2
Citizens' Group: Serbian Right for Our Home Niška Banja–Siniša Stamenković	192	2.81	–
United Peasant Party–Milija Miletić	171	2.50	–
Ne Damo Niš–Bojan Avramović	130	1.90	–
Total	6,835	100.00	19
Valid votes	6,835	96.59	
Invalid/blank votes	241	3.41	
Total votes	7,076	100.00	
Registered voters/turnout	12,075	58.60	

Dušan Živković of the Progressive Party was chosen as mayor after the election by a unanimous vote.

====== Niš: Palilula ======
Results of the election for the Municipal Assembly of Palilula, Niš:

Party	Votes	%	Seats
Aleksandar Vučić—For Our Children (Serbian Progressive Party, Movement of Socialists, Party of United Pensioners of Serbia)	16,392	61.77	19
Citizens' Groups (five different lists)	3,459	13.03	1
Ivica Dačić–"Socialist Party of Serbia (SPS), United Serbia (JS)–Dragan Marković Palma"	3,003	11.32	3
Aleksandar Šapić–Victory for Niš (Serbian Patriotic Alliance, Rusyn Democratic Party)	1,343	5.06	1
METLA 2020–Living Wall (Democratic Party of Serbia, People's Strong Serbia)	917	3.46	1
Russian Party–Milan Krstić	503	1.90	–
Dr. Vojislav Šešelj–Serbian Radical Party	474	1.79	–
United Peasant Party–Milija Miletić	447	1.68	–
Total	26,538	100.00	25
Valid votes	26,538	96.37	
Invalid/blank votes	1,000	3.63	
Total votes	27,538	100.00	
Registered voters/turnout	64,671	42.58	

Bratislav Vučković of the Progressive Party was chosen as mayor after the election.

====== Niš: Pantelej ======
Results of the election for the Municipal Assembly of Pantelej:

Party	Votes	%	Seats
Aleksandar Vučić—For Our Children (Serbian Progressive Party, Party of United Pensioners of Serbia, Social Democratic Party of Serbia, Strength of Serbia Movement)	10,816	57.31	16
"Slaviša Dinić–Coalition for Pantelej"	2,022	10.71	2
Ivica Dačić–"Socialist Party of Serbia (SPS), United Serbia (JS)–Dragan Marković Palma"	1,296	6.87	1
Aleksandar Šapić–Victory for Niš (Serbian Patriotic Alliance)	1,009	5.35	1
Ne Damo Niš–Bojan Avramović	747	3.96	1
Sergej Trifunović–Movement of Free Citizens	744	3.94	1
United Peasant Party–Milija Miletić	697	3.69	1
Dr. Vojislav Šešelj–Serbian Radical Party	490	2.60	–
Russian Party–Milan Krstić	444	2.35	–
People's Blok–Honestly for Niš–General Momir Stojanović (New Serbia, People's Freedom Movement)	382	2.02	–
Citizens' Group: Serbian Right for Our Home Pantelej–Dejan Zdravković	226	1.20	–
Total	18,873	100.00	23
Valid votes	18,873	96.23	
Invalid/blank votes	740	3.77	
Total votes	19,613	100.00	
Registered voters/turnout	45,227	43.37	

Nataša Stanković of the Progressive Party was chosen as mayor after the election with the support of twenty delegates.

===== Aleksinac =====
Results of the election for the Municipal Assembly of Aleksinac:

Party	Votes	%	Seats
Aleksandar Vučić—For Our Children (Serbian Progressive Party, Social Democratic Party of Serbia, Party of United Pensioners of Serbia)	13,576	62.82	29
Ivica Dačić–"Socialist Party of Serbia (SPS), United Serbia (JS)–Dragan Marković Palma"	4,184	19.36	8
Ivan Dimić–For a Better Municipality of Aleksinac	1,345	6.22	2
People's Movement	828	3.83	1
Party of Russians of Serbia	610	2.82	1
Dr. Vojislav Šešelj–Serbian Radical Party	553	2.56	–
United Peasant Party–Milija Miletić	514	2.38	–
Total	21,610	100.00	41
Valid votes	21,610	96.34	
Invalid/blank votes	821	3.66	
Total votes	22,431	100.00	
Registered voters/turnout	41,414	54.16	

Dalibor Radičević of the Progressive Party was chosen as mayor after the election.

===== Doljevac =====
There was no election for the Municipal Assembly of Doljevac in 2020. The previous election had taken place in 2018 and the next election took place in 2022.

===== Gadžin Han =====
Results of the election for the Municipal Assembly of Gadžin Han:

Party	Votes	%	Seats
Aleksandar Vučić—For Our Children (Serbian Progressive Party, Social Democratic Party of Serbia, Strength of Serbia Movement, United Peasant Party)	2,928	60.30	15
Ivica Dačić–"Socialist Party of Serbia (SPS), United Serbia (JS)–Dragan Marković Palma"	1,928	39.70	10
Total	4,856	100.00	25
Valid votes	4,856	96.91	
Invalid/blank votes	155	3.09	
Total votes	5,011	100.00	
Registered voters/turnout	6,198	80.85	

Milisav Filipović of the Serbian Progressive Party was chosen as mayor after the election. The Socialist Party and United Serbia served in opposition.

Filipović resigned as mayor in late 2023 to prompt a new election later in the year and was appointed as leader of a provisional authority.

===== Merošina =====
Results of the election for the Municipal Assembly of Merošina:

Party	Votes	%	Seats
Aleksandar Vučić—For Our Children (Serbian Progressive Party, Party of United Pensioners of Serbia, Social Democratic Party of Serbia, Strength of Serbia Movement)	4,745	61.41	20
Ivica Dačić–"Socialist Party of Serbia (SPS), United Serbia (JS)–Dragan Marković Palma"	1,498	19.39	6
Citizens' Group: Serbian Right for Our Home Merošina–Goran Mikić	704	9.11	3
Merošina and the village, Grad. Economist Damjan Tonić (Democratic Party of Serbia, United Peasant Party)	589	7.62	2
Dr. Vojislav Šešelj–Serbian Radical Party	191	2.47	–
Total	7,727	100.00	31
Valid votes	7,727	96.78	
Invalid/blank votes	257	3.22	
Total votes	7,984	100.00	
Registered voters/turnout	10,168	78.52	

Saša Jovanović of the Serbian Progressive Party was chosen as mayor after the election. Jovanović resigned in late 2023 to prompt a new election later in the year and was appointed as leader of a provisional authority.

===== Ražanj =====
Results of the election for the Municipal Assembly of Ražanj:

Party	Votes	%	Seats
Citizens' Group: Dobrica Stojković	1,866	48.93	13
Aleksandar Vučić—For Our Children (Serbian Progressive Party, Party of United Pensioners of Serbia)	1,223	32.07	9
Ivica Dačić–"Socialist Party of Serbia (SPS)"	402	10.54	3
Citizens' Group: Verislav Velisavljević - Verče	323	8.47	2
Total	3,814	100.00	27
Valid votes	3,814	90.06	
Invalid/blank votes	421	9.94	
Total votes	4,235	100.00	
Registered voters/turnout	6,388	66.30	

Incumbent mayor Dobrica Stojković was confirmed for another term in office after the election. On 3 November 2021, Stojković and his entire assembly group joined the Progressive Party.

Stojković resigned as mayor on 30 October 2023 to prompt a new election later in the year and was appointed as leader of a provisional authority.

===== Svrljig =====
Results of the election for the Municipal Assembly of Svrljig:

Party	Votes	%	Seats
Aleksandar Vučić—For Our Children (Serbian Progressive Party, United Peasant Party)	4,240	63.67	19
Citizens' Group: Movement for the Salvation of Svrljig	1,290	19.37	6
Ivica Dačić–"Socialist Party of Serbia (SPS)"	586	8.80	2
Dragan Marković Palma–United Serbia (JS)	204	3.06	–
METLA Movement 2020 (Democratic Party of Serbia, Green Party of Serbia)	186	2.79	–
Dr. Vojislav Šešelj–Serbian Radical Party	117	1.76	–
Citizens' Group: Serbian Right for Our Home Svrljig	36	0.54	–
Total	6,659	100.00	27
Valid votes	6,659	97.50	
Invalid/blank votes	171	2.50	
Total votes	6,830	100.00	
Registered voters/turnout	10,945	62.40	

Miroslav Marković of the United Peasant Party was chosen as mayor after the election. A member of the Progressive Party was chosen as his deputy.

==== Pirot District ====
Local elections were held in the one city (Pirot) and the three other municipalities of the Pirot District. The Serbian Progressive Party and its allies won majority victories in all jurisdictions.

===== Pirot =====
Results of the election for the City Assembly of Pirot:

Party	Votes	%	Seats
Aleksandar Vučić—For Our Children (Serbian Progressive Party, Movement of Socialists, Social Democratic Party of Serbia)	14,467	57.36	36
Citizens' Group: "The Best for Pirot–Let's Defend the Rivers, Let's Defend Pirot–Dr. Žarko Todorović"	2,910	11.54	7
Ivica Dačić–Socialist Party of Serbia (SPS)	2,762	10.95	6
Citizens' Group: "Professor Vladica Tošić–Victory for the Future of Pirot"	1,759	6.97	4
For the Kingdom of Serbia–Pirot Is for the King (POKS-Movement for the Restoration of the Kingdom of Serbia, Monarchist Front)–Miloš Todosijević	831	3.29	2
Citizens' Group: Serbian Right–Ninoslav Ćirić–Pirot Can Do Better	795	3.15	1
Citizens' Group: Voice of the People–Dušan Mitić	655	2.60	–
Dr. Vojislav Šešelj–Serbian Radical Party	357	1.42	–
Party of United Pensioners of Serbia–Milan Krkobabić	352	1.40	–
Dragan Marković Palma–United Serbia	334	1.32	–
Total	25,222	100.00	56
Valid votes	25,222	96.57	
Invalid/blank votes	896	3.43	
Total votes	26,118	100.00	
Registered voters/turnout	47,215	55.32	

Incumbent mayor Vladan Vasić of the Serbian Progressive Party was confirmed for a new term in office after the election. Vasić submitted his resignation on 29 September 2023 to prompt a a new local election later in the year. His resignation became official on 31 October, at which time he was appointed as leader of a provisional authority.

===== Babušnica =====
Results of the election for the Municipal Assembly of Babušnica:

Party	Votes	%	Seats
Aleksandar Vučić—For Our Children (Serbian Progressive Party, Movement of Socialists)	4,286	62.29	16
Ivica Dačić–"Socialist Party of Serbia (SPS), Democratic Party of Bulgarians (DPB)"	1,068	15.52	4
Mr. Milan Stamenković–SINGER (Better Serbia, Russian Party)	1,037	15.07	3
Social Democratic Party of Serbia–Dragan Petrović	223	3.24	–
Mila Prljinčević Stanković Movement of Free Citizens of Babušnica	188	2.73	–
For the Kingdom of Serbia–Babušnica Is for the King (Movement for the Restoration of the Kingdom of Serbia, Monarchist Front)–Ivan Stanimirović	79	1.15	–
Total	6,881	100.00	23
Valid votes	6,881	97.15	
Invalid/blank votes	202	2.85	
Total votes	7,083	100.00	
Registered voters/turnout	9,105	77.79	

Ivana Stojičić of the Serbian Progressive Party was chosen as mayor after the election. Stojičić resigned in late 2023 to prompt a a new local election later in the year. Her resignation became official on 30 October 2023, at which time she was appointed as leader of a provisional authority.

===== Bela Palanka =====
Results of the election for the Municipal Assembly of Bela Palanka:

Party	Votes	%	Seats
Aleksandar Vučić—For Our Children (Serbian Progressive Party, Party of United Pensioners of Serbia)	5,687	79.91	24
Ivica Dačić–"Socialist Party of Serbia (SPS)"	908	12.76	3
Dr. Vojislav Šešelj–Serbian Radical Party	522	7.33	2
Total	7,117	100.00	29
Valid votes	7,117	95.96	
Invalid/blank votes	300	4.04	
Total votes	7,417	100.00	
Registered voters/turnout	9,067	81.80	

Incumbent mayor Goran Miljković of the Serbian Progressive Party was confirmed for another term in office after the election. Miljković resigned in late 2023 to prompt a a new local election later in the year. His resignation became official on 6 November 2023, at which time he was appointed as leader of a provisional authority.

===== Dimitrovgrad =====
Results of the election for the Municipal Assembly of Dimitrovgrad:

Party	Votes	%	Seats
Aleksandar Vučić—For Our Children (Serbian Progressive Party, Party of United Pensioners of Serbia)	3,181	59.89	19
Democratic Party of Bulgarians–Nebojša Ivanov	823	15.50	4
Ivica Dačić–"Socialist Party of Serbia (SPS)"	541	10.19	3
Dragan Marković Palma–United Serbia	389	7.32	2
Citizens' Group: "Feniks" Caribrod, Work and Truth for a Stable Family, Milko Sokolov Ganja	213	4.01	1
Dr. Vojislav Šešelj–Serbian Radical Party	164	3.09	–
Total	5,311	100.00	29
Valid votes	5,311	95.04	
Invalid/blank votes	277	4.96	
Total votes	5,588	100.00	
Registered voters/turnout	8,394	66.57	

Incumbent mayor Vladica Dimitrov of the Serbian Progressive Party was chosen for another term in office after the election. He resigned on 28 September 2023 to prompt a a new local election later in the year. His resignation became official on 30 October 2023, at which time he was appointed as leader of a provisional authority.

==== Podunavlje District ====
Local elections were held in the one city (Smederevo) and one of the other two municipalities (Velika Plana) of the Podunavlje District. The Serbian Progressive Party and its allies won majority victories in both jurisdictions.

===== Smederevo =====
Results of the election for the City Assembly of Smederevo:

Party	Votes	%	Seats
Aleksandar Vučić—For Our Children (Serbian Progressive Party, Serbian Renewal Movement)	24,731	59.08	46
Ivica Dačić–"Socialist Party of Serbia (SPS), United Serbia (JS)–Dragan Marković Palma"	6,512	15.56	12
Citizens' Group: United Democratic Serbia–The Key of Change–For Our Smederevo–Dr. Ivan Stevanović	2,674	6.39	4
METLA 2020–Professor Nebojša Jovanović (Democratic Party of Serbia, People's Strong Serbia)	2,628	6.28	4
Aleksandar Šapić–Victory for Smederevo (Serbian Patriotic Alliance, Serbian People's Party)	2,564	6.12	4
Smederevo People's Bloc–Nadežda Stanimirović (New Serbia, People's Freedom Movement)	1,015	2.42	–
Dr. Vojislav Šešelj–Serbian Radical Party	911	2.18	–
United Russian Party	828	1.98	–
Total	41,863	100.00	70
Valid votes	41,863	95.93	
Invalid/blank votes	1,775	4.07	
Total votes	43,638	100.00	
Registered voters/turnout	96,607	45.17	

Jovan Beč of the Serbian Progressive Party was chosen as mayor after the election. Beč submitted his resignation on 28 September 2023 to prompt a a new local election later in the year. His resignation became official on 30 October, at which time Jasmina Vojinović, also of the Progressive Party, was appointed as leader of a provisional authority.

===== Smederevska Palanka =====
There was no municipal election in Smederevska Palanka in 2020. The previous election had taken place in 2018, and the next election took place in 2022.

===== Velika Plana =====
Results of the election for the Municipal Assembly of Velika Plana:

Party	Votes	%	Seats
Aleksandar Vučić—For Our Children (Serbian Progressive Party, Party of United Pensioners of Serbia)	12,211	69.68	28
Ivica Dačić–"Socialist Party of Serbia (SPS), United Serbia (JS)–Dragan Marković Palma"	2,149	12.26	5
METLA 2020–Dejan B. Šulkić (Democratic Party of Serbia, People's Strong Serbia)	1,420	8.10	3
For the Kingdom of Serbia–Velika Plana (Movement for the Restoration of the Kingdom of Serbia, Monarchist Front)	668	3.81	1
Dr. Vojislav Šešelj–Serbian Radical Party	543	3.10	1
Serbian Russian Wolves Party	335	1.91	1
Citizens' Group: Serbian Right–Velika Plana Can Do Better	198	1.13	–
Total	17,524	100.00	39
Valid votes	17,524	96.65	
Invalid/blank votes	608	3.35	
Total votes	18,132	100.00	
Registered voters/turnout	36,244	50.03	

Incumbent mayor Igor Matković of the Serbian Progressive Party was confirmed for another term in office after the election.

Notwithstanding that his name appeared on the ballot, Dejan Šulkić took the twelfth position on the METLA 2020 list and was not re-elected to the assembly.

Igor Matković resigned as mayor on 30 October 2023 to prompt a new election later in the year and was appointed as leader of a provisional authority.

==== Zaječar District ====
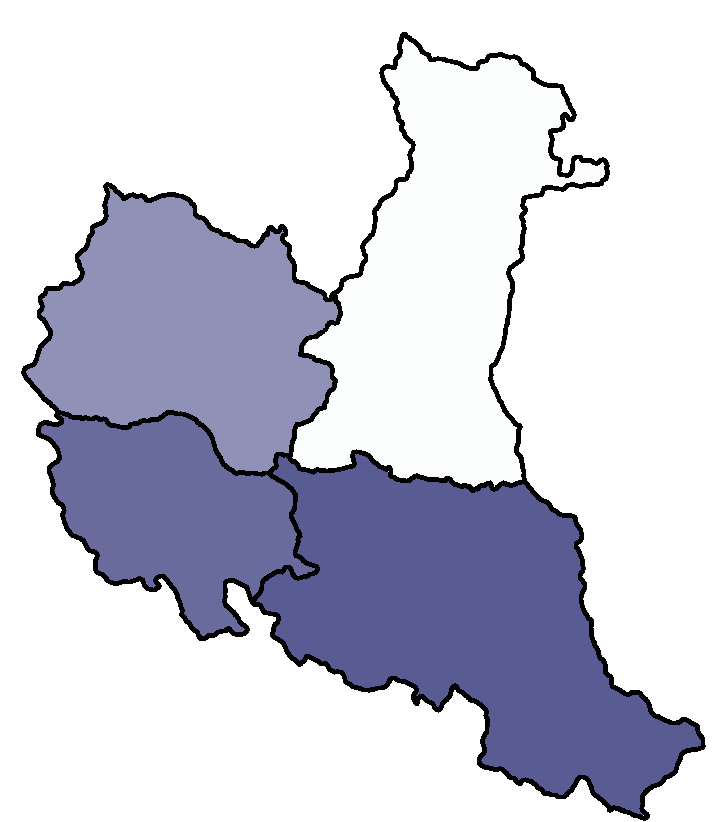
Results of local elections in Zaječar by municipality

===== Zaječar =====
Party	Votes	%	Seats
Group of citizens - total	8,365	36.89	18
SNS-SDPS coalition	7,105	31.33	18
DS-SDS-LDP-NS coalition	3,869	17.06	9
SPS-JS coalition	2,142	9.45	5
Party of United Pensioners of Serbia	557	2.46	–
Dveri-DSS-VNS coalition	357	1.57	–
Serbian Radical Party	283	1.25	–
Total	22,678	100.00	50
Valid votes	22,678	98.35	
Invalid/blank votes	380	1.65	
Total votes	23,058	100.00	
Source: Republika Srbija - Republički zavod za statistiku - Lokalni izbori Republika Srbija 2020. Bureau of Statistics, Republic of Serbia; p. 61

Boško Ničić of his group of citizens was elected as Mayor of Zaječar with the support of SNS and SPS. Ničić later joined SNS.

===== Boljevac =====
Party	Votes	%	Seats
SNS-PUPS-SDP coalition	3,225	51.36	13
Serbian People's Party	1,022	16.28	4
SPS-JS coalition	925	14.73	4
Vlach Party "Most"	644	10.26	2
Vlach National Party	463	7.37	2
Total	6,279	100.00	25
Valid votes	6,279	96.57	
Invalid/blank votes	223	3.43	
Total votes	6,502	100.00	
Source: Republika Srbija - Republički zavod za statistiku - Lokalni izbori Republika Srbija 2020. Bureau of Statistics, Republic of Serbia; p. 61

===== Knjaževac =====
Party	Votes	%	Seats
SNS-SDPS-USS coalition	10,344	75.89	32
Socialist Party of Serbia	1,931	14.17	5
POKS-Monarchist Front	1,005	7.37	3
Serbian Radical Party	350	2.57	–
Total	13,630	100.00	40
Valid votes	13,630	96.05	
Invalid/blank votes	560	3.95	
Total votes	14,190	100.00	
Source: Republika Srbija - Republički zavod za statistiku - Lokalni izbori Republika Srbija 2020. Bureau of Statistics, Republic of Serbia; p. 61

===== Sokobanja =====
Party	Votes	%	Seats
SNS-SDPS-PUPS coalition	4,922	69.44	19
Socialist Party of Serbia	1,119	15.79	4
United Peasant Party	623	8.79	2
Serbian Radical Party	227	3.20	–
United Serbia	197	2.78	–
Total	7,088	100.00	25
Valid votes	7,088	95.69	
Invalid/blank votes	319	4.31	
Total votes	7,407	100.00	
Source: Republika Srbija - Republički zavod za statistiku - Lokalni izbori Republika Srbija 2020. Bureau of Statistics, Republic of Serbia; p. 61
