= Minela Kalender =

Serbian politician (born 1984)

Member of the National Assembly of the Republic of Serbia
- Incumbent
- Assumed office 26 September 2024

Personal details
- Born: May 28, 1984 (age 41)
- Party: SDA
- Occupation: Sanitary Engineer

Minela Kalender (Serbian Cyrillic: Минела Календер; born 28 May 1984) is a Serbian politician from the country's Bosniak community. She has served in the Serbian national assembly since September 2024. Kalender is also an elected delegate in Serbia's Bosniak National Council (BNV) and has held high political office in Sjenica. She is a member of the Party of Democratic Action of Sandžak (SDA).

== Private career ==
Kalender is a graduated sanitary engineer. She lives in Sjenica.

== Politician ==
=== Early years in Sjenica ===
Kalender was elected to the Sjenica municipal assembly in the 2012 Serbian local elections. The SDA won a plurality victory with twelve out of thirty-nine seats and afterward formed a coalition government that included its traditional rival, the Sandžak Democratic Party (SDP). Kalender served in the assembly as a supporter of the administration.

The SDA formed a new coalition administration without the SDP in November 2014, and Kalender was appointed as deputy mayor in place of local SDP leader Muriz Turković. By virtue of accepting this position, she was required to resign from the assembly.

Kalender appeared in the third position on the SDA's electoral list for Sjenica in the 2016 Serbian local elections and was re-elected when the list won fifteen seats. She stood down as deputy mayor on 30 May 2016 and on the same day was appointed as a member of the municipal council (i.e., the executive branch of the local government). Once again, she was required to resign from the local assembly to hold an executive position. Her term on the municipal council appears to have been brief; she attended its inaugural meeting on 9 June 2016, but by September 2016 she was no longer listed as a member.

Kalender also appeared in the third position on the SDA's list in the 2016 Serbian parliamentary election, which was held concurrently with the local elections. The list won two seats, and she was not elected. She had the opportunity to enter the assembly in August 2016 as a replacement for party leader Sulejman Ugljanin, but she instead declined the mandate.

=== Bosniak National Council member ===
Kalender was given the ninth position on a SDA-affiliated list in the 2018 election for Serbia's Bosniak National Council and was elected when the list won a plurality victory with fourteen out of thirty-five seats. After the election, the SDA formed a coalition administration with a SDP-affiliated list, and Kalender served as a member of the BNV's executive board.

She received the fourth position on the SDA's electoral list in the 2020 parliamentary election and again narrowly missed direct election when the list won three seats. (The three elected SDA members served for the entirety of the parliament that followed, and she did not have the opportunity to enter the assembly as a replacement.) She again received the fourth position in the 2022 parliamentary election and was not elected as the list fell back to two seats.

Kalender was promoted to the sixth position on the SDA's list in the 2022 Bosniak National Council election and was re-elected when the list won ten seats. After the election, the SDA formed a new coalition government with the Justice and Reconciliation Party (SPP). This arrangement did not last, and in 2024 the SDA formed a new partnership with the SDP.

Kalender once again received the fourth position on the SDA's list in the 2023 parliamentary election and was not immediately elected when the list won two seats.

She was given the fourth position on the SDA's list for Sjenica in the 2024 Serbian local elections and, after an absence of eight years, was elected to a third term in the municipal assembly when the list won eight seats. The SPP narrowly won the election and afterward formed a coalition government without the SDA. As of 2024, Kalender continues to serve in the assembly as an opposition member.

=== Parliamentarian ===
Selma Kučević, who had been elected to the Serbian parliament in 2023 as the lead candidate on the SDA's list, resigned her seat after becoming the mayor of Tutin on 1 August 2024. The SDA's leadership decided later in the month that Kalender would be her replacement, bypassing the third-ranked candidate Mirza Hajdinović. (Technically, Hajdinović accepted Kučević's vacated mandate and became a member of assembly on 24 September 2024. He resigned on the same day, however, and Kalender was named as his replacement.)

Kalender took her parliamentary mandate on 26 October 2024. The Serbian Progressive Party (SNS) and its allies hold a majority in the assembly, and she serves in opposition with a parliamentary group that includes the SDA, the Movement of Free Citizens (PSG), and the Party for Democratic Action (PDD).
