= Esad Džudžo =

Serbian politician (born 1958)

Esad Džudžo (Serbian Cyrillic: Есад Џуџо; born 5 July 1958), who was known until 2014 as Esad Džudžević (Serbian Cyrillic: Есад Џуџевић), is a Serbian politician from the country's Bosniak community. He has served in the Serbian and Yugoslavian parliaments, led the Bosniak National Council, and played a prominent role in the local government of Tutin.

Džudžo was for many years the leader of the Bosniak Democratic Party of Sandžak (BDSS), which was closely aligned with Sulejman Ugljanin's Party of Democratic Action of Sandžak (SDA).

== Early life and career ==
Džudžo was born in the village of Mitrova in Tutin, in the Sandžak region of what was then the People's Republic of Serbia in the Federal People's Republic of Yugoslavia. He graduated from the University of Belgrade Faculty of Philosophy in sociology in 1986.

He was one of the founders of the Bosniak Cultural Society "Revival" on 9 March 1991, founded and became the first director of the Sandžak National Library "Vehbija Hodžić" in 1994, and was chosen as editor of the newspaper Sandžačkih novina in January 1996.

== Politician ==
=== Early years (1996–2000) ===
Džudžo founded the True Party of Democratic Action (Prava Stranka demokratske akcije, PSDA) on 15 June 1996 in Novi Pazar. The party soon aligned itself with Ugljanin's List for Sandžak (LZS) coalition, which was dominated by the SDA. The LZS won a landslide victory in Tutin in the 1996 Serbian local elections with thirty-two out of thirty-five seats, and Džudžo was chosen afterward as president of the municipality's executive committee.

In the 1997 Serbian parliamentary election, Džudžo appeared in the sixth position on the LZS's electoral list for the Kraljevo constituency. The list won two seats, which were assigned to its two leading candidates, Fevzija Murić and Šemsudin Kučević. (From 1992 to 2000, Serbia's electoral law stipulated that one-third of parliamentary mandates would be assigned to candidates from successful lists in numerical order, while the remaining two-thirds would be distributed amongst other candidates at the discretion of the sponsoring parties. Džudžo could in theory have been assigned the second mandate, though ultimately he was not.)

The True Party of Democratic Action renamed itself as the Bosniak Democratic Party of Sandžak on 20 April 1998, due to its opposition to the policies of the Party of Democratic Action of Bosnia and Herzegovina pertaining to Sandžak and the Bosniak community of the Federal Republic of Yugoslavia (FRY). Džudžo said at the time that the BDSS would fight for democracy in Yugoslavia, seek to resolve the status of the Sandžak as a modern European region, and affirm the Bosniak community's national rights in the Sandžak.

In May 1999, Džudžo received a six-month prison sentence for illegal payments to a lawyer in a matter relating to a court case against him. The Bosnian News Agency BH Press described the sentence as politically motivated and as taking place in the context of ongoing state persecution of the Bosniak community. The conviction would presumably have been appealed, and there is no indication that Džudžo served the sentence.

=== Member of the Yugoslavian parliament (2000–03) ===
During the 1990s, Serbian and Yugoslavian politics were dominated by the authoritarian rule of Socialist Party of Serbia (SPS) leader Slobodan Milošević and his allies. In early 2000, a broad multi-party alliance called the Democratic Opposition of Serbia (DOS) was established to challenge Milošević's rule. The List for Sandžak did not join the DOS, due in part to divisions among the Bosniak parties of the Sandžak, but it cooperated with the alliance in the 2000 Yugoslavian general election, in which Milošević fell from power after being defeated by DOS candidate Vojislav Koštunica in the presidential contest.

The 2000 Yugoslavian election saw the first and only direct elections for the Chamber of Republics, the upper house of the Yugoslavian parliament. As part of the cooperation pact between the DOS and the LZS, Džudžo was given the nineteenth position out of twenty on the DOS's electoral list for Serbia. The list won ten of the twenty seats, and he was assigned a mandate when the assembly convened on 24 September 2000. (For this election, half of the assembly mandates were awarded in numerical order with the other half assigned at the discretion of the sponsoring parties or coalitions. Via a prior arrangement with the LZS, Džudžo was given one of the DOS's "optional" mandates.)

The List for Sandžak also won a second consecutive landslide victory in Tutin for the 2000 Serbian local elections, taking thirty-four out of thirty-seven seats. Džudžo continued serving as chair of the municipal government's executive committee for the four-year term that followed.

During this period, Džudžo was an advocate for decentralization within the constitutional framework of the Federal Republic of Yugoslavia. He supported calls for greater autonomy in Vojvodina and Šumadija and argued that Bosniaks were increasingly prepared to support the unity of Yugoslavia along with the unity of the Sandžak and the Bosniak people. In October 2001, he encouraged Bosniaks in Kosovo to participate in the 2001 Kosovan parliamentary election.

In June 2002, Yugoslavian president Vojislav Koštunica appointed Džudžo to a constitutional commission drafting the charter of the new State Union of Serbia and Montenegro (successor to the Federal Republic of Yugoslavia). At a press conference after his appointment, Džudžo called for the commission to address the issue of minority communities via accepted European standards, which would include setting guidelines for regionalization. As a member of the committee, he called for Bosniaks to be recognized as a constituent nation of Serbia and Montenegro and proposed that an assembly of peoples and regions become part of the future state union's parliament. Mujo Muković of the Sandžak Democratic Party (SDP), the only other commission member from the Sandžak, had a poor relationship with Džudžo and accused him of making "unrealistic" requests that did not take into account the border dividing the Sandžak region between Serbia and Montenegro. Džudžo ultimately resigned from the commission in November 2002 when it refused to accept some of his proposals; he said that he could not agree to "the Sandžak region that stretches on both sides of the [Serbia-Montenegro] border being divided." In January 2003, he said that the completed charter did not recognize the legitimate rights of national minorities and created a legal framework for the division of its two constituent republics.

The Yugoslavian Chamber of Republics was abolished when the State Union of Serbia and Montenegro formally came into being on 4 February 2003, and Džudžo's parliamentary term came to an end. He criticized the fact that Bosniaks had no representatives in the new unicameral parliament of the state union.

=== Member of the Serbian parliament and the Bosniak National Council ===
The Bosniak National Council was established in September 2003 as a successor to the Bosniak National Council of Sandžak; unlike its predecessor, it was formally recognized by state authorities as the representative body of Bosniaks in Serbia and Montenegro. Ugljanin was chosen as the council's first president, and Džudžo became the president of its executive committee. In November 2003, Džudžo accused Montenegrin authorities of pressuring Bosniaks to declare their first language as Montenegrin rather than Bosnian.

==== First term in the national assembly (2004–07) ====
In the 2003 Serbian parliamentary election, Džudžo and Bajram Omeragić, the leader of the LZS-affiliated Social Liberal Party of Sandžak (SLPS), appeared on the electoral list of the Democratic Party (DS). Their presence on the list was the source of some controversy in Sandžak political circles. Ugljanin's rival Rasim Ljajić had previously reached an understanding with the Democratic Party that its list would not include SDA candidates; while Džudžo and Omeragić were not SDA members, they were both SDA allies, and Ljajić viewed their inclusion on the list as a form of betrayal. Džudžo ultimately appeared in the 108th position on the DS list and was given a mandate when the list won thirty-seven seats. (From 2000 to 2011, all mandates in Serbian parliamentary elections were awarded to sponsoring parties or coalitions rather than individual candidates, and it was common practice for the mandates to be distributed out of numerical order. Džudžo's position on the list, which was in any event mostly alphabetical, had no specific bearing on his chances of election.)

The Democratic Party announced that it would not become part of Serbia's incoming coalition government after the 2003 election. Džudžo and Omeragić (who also received an assembly mandate) by contrast expressed an interest in joining the new ministry, saying they had a technical alliance with the DS but were not bound by its decisions. Both delegates ultimately remained out of government and joined the DS's assembly group when the new parliament convened in early 2004.

Shortly after the assembly convened, Džudžo was named as chair of its committee on interethnic relations. He opposed the assembly's recommendations on state symbols in August 2004, describing the proposals as "an assault on Serbia as a multiethnic, multireligious, and multicultural place" and calling for greater recognition of the symbols of national minorities. In late 2004, he urged Serbian state authorities to include the Bosnian language with elements of national culture as an optional subject in elementary and secondary schools. He was removed as committee chair on 8 April 2005 at the initiative of the Serbian Radical Party (SRS) and the Socialist Party of Serbia (SPS). After this time, he served as a member of the culture and information committee.

He proposed in July 2005 that July 11 be declared a day of remembrance for victims of the 1995 Srebrenica massacre.

Džudžo and Omeragić were removed from the DS's assembly group on 30 August 2005 after voting against the party's wishes on a number of key issues, including the privatization of Naftna Industrija Srbije (NIS). The two delegates subsequently announced that they would support Serbia's administration led by Vojislav Koštunica of the rival Democratic Party of Serbia (DSS). In September 2005, Ugljanin signed an agreement with Koštunica for the List for Sandžak to have representation in government at the deputy minister level. Džudžo was appointed as a deputy minister in the ministry of education, although he ultimately declined the position in order to continue serving in the national assembly.

Džudžo welcomed the beginning of Serbia and Montenegro's stabilization and association talks with the European Union in November 2005, arguing that this would provide a firmer guarantee of human rights standards in the state union.

Ugljanin and Džudžo encouraged Montenegro's Bosniak community to vote in favour of a continued state union in the 2006 Montenegrin independence referendum. Their efforts were not successful: a majority of voters, and a large majority of Bosniak voters, supported the independence option. In the aftermath of the vote, Džudžo advocated for the long-term goal of regional self-government in the Serbian Sandžak with continued ties to Montenegro's Bosniak community under European models of trans-boundary cooperation. He added that regional self-government would only become a reality when it was accepted by all communities of the area (including the Serb community) as the best option in political, economic, and other terms.

Since Montenegro's declaration of independence in 2006, the Bosniak National Council has only operated in Serbia.

==== Second and third terms in the national assembly (2007–12) ====
The List for Sandžak ran its own electoral list in the 2007 Serbian parliamentary election, the first to be held after the electoral threshold was waived for lists representing national minority communities. Džudžo was included in the third position on the list and received a mandate for a second term when LZS won two seats. On 23 May 2007, he was appointed as a deputy speaker of the assembly. In January 2008, he announced that the List for Sandžak was endorsing Boris Tadić's bid for re-election in the second round of the 2008 Serbian presidential election.

The coalition government formed after the 2007 election broke apart in early 2008, and a new parliamentary election was called for 11 May 2008. Džudžo appeared in the second position on the LZS's Bosniak List for a European Sandžak and was chosen for a third term in the national assembly when the list won two seats. In this sitting of parliament, he was a member of the environmental protection committee, the administrative committee, and the committee for culture and information, as well as a deputy member of the industry committee and the committee for international relations, the leader of Serbia's parliamentary friendship group with Tunisia, and a member of the friendship groups with Bosnia and Herzegovina and Turkey.

In May 2009, Džudžo blamed Mufti Muamer Zukorlić for elements of radicalization that had emerged among the Sandžak's Bosniak community in recent years. He was quoted as saying that Zukorlić's growing body of followers included "some guys with beards that are not at all in the tradition of our Islam [in the Sandžak region]." Later in the year, he accused Zukorlić of inappropriate interference in Sandžak politics and suggested that Zukorlić form his own political party if he wanted to be active in the field.

When the Serbian government created new statistical regions for the country in 2010, Džudžo urged that the municipalities of the Sandžak be counted as a separate administrative district within Šumadija and Western Serbia. This request was not granted. He later called for the interior ministry to take decisive measures to increase the numbers of Bosniaks and members of other national minorities in Serbia's police force in the Sandžak region.

Džudžo was not a candidate in the 2012 Serbian parliamentary election, and his assembly term ended that year.

=== Leader of the Bosniak National Council ===
In June 2010, Serbia held the first direct elections for its national minority councils, and the Bosniak National Council held its first elections of any kind since 2003. Džudžo was given the lead position on the SDA-aligned "Bosniak List." A list affiliated with Zukorlić won the election with seventeen seats, while the Bosniak List won thirteen and a "Bosniak Renaissance" list aligned with Rasim Ljajić won five. The results were extremely contentious, and the legitimacy of the Bosniak Cultural Community's victory was contested by both the Serbian government and Ugljanin's party. Zukorlić's group held a constituent session for the council on 7 July 2010, which was also attended by two delegates from Bosniak Renaissance. This iteration of the council, dominated by Zukorlić's followers, continued to meet afterward but was not recognized by the Serbian government. Discussions took place among various parties for a repeat vote, but these were not successful. Džudžo's role as leader of the recognized council's executive committee was extended in a technical mandate, although his authority was challenged by the continued existence of the parallel council run by Zukorlić's followers.

In August 2012, the officially recognized Bosniak National Council unveiled a plaque to Aćif Hadžiahmetović, the mayor of Novi Pazar during World War II who was later executed by Yugoslav Partisans for war crimes against Serbs and for collaboration with the Axis powers. Ugljanin and Džudžo were both present for the ceremony. The Serbian government ordered the plaque to be removed; Džudžo said that he opposed its removal and did not believe it would ever be removed.

In May 2014, Džudžo called for Bosniaks to change their surnames by removing the "-ić" and "-vić" suffixes that he said had been imposed on the community after the Sandžak was incorporated into the states of Serbia and Montenegro. He described this as a long-term national project of particular importance to the community. His proposal was met with disapproval from the Serbian government and with derision from many in the Bosniak community itself. Meho Omerović, a Serbian parliamentarian of Bosniak origin, was quoted as saying, "The caretaker chairman has come to believe that the Bosniak National Council is his own property [...] I have never before heard anything so stupid, and, let's face it, one can hear all sorts of things said in Serbia. From this day, he is the champion of nonsense." Džudžo changed his own surname in this period, although few other members of the Bosniak community followed his example.

The Serbian government held a new election for the Bosniak National Council in 2014. The only lists to contest the election were those affiliated with Ugljanin and Zukorlić; Ugljanin's list won by nineteen seats to sixteen. Džudžo received the eighth position on Uglanin's list and was re-elected. Ugljanin was again chosen as president when the new council convened, while Džudžo became one of its vice-presidents for the term that followed.

Džudžo formally dissolved the Bosniak Democratic Party of Sandžak in 2017. By this time, the party had been dormant for a period of several years. Džudžo said that the BDSS had served its purpose and that the SDA was now continuing its legacy.

Džudžo received the fifth position on Ugljanin's list in the 2018 election for the Bosniak National Council and was re-elected when it won fourteen seats, as against thirteen for Zukorlić's list and eight for Ljajić's. The supporters of Ugljanin and Ljajić formed a new coalition after the election; Ugljanin was no longer eligible to chair the council, and Džudžo was chosen as his successor. His term lasted for just over a year. In June 2019, the council presented an address to the governments of Serbia and Montenegro calling for the Sandžak to receive special self-governing status. Džudžo distanced himself from the address, saying that it was made without his knowledge or support. Subsequently, SDA leader Sulejman Ugljanin endorsed the call for special status, and leading SDA officials called for Džudžo to resign. Džudžo dismissed the calls and criticized the special status initiative as the work of a pro-Albanian lobby group operating within the SDA. The council removed Džudžo as leader shortly thereafter against the backdrop of these divisions, although the special status initiative ultimately gained little traction.

=== Since 2019 ===
Džudžo was expelled from the SDA in January 2020. For the 2020 Serbian local elections, he supported an independent list led by former SDA member Bajro Gegić in Tutin. He subsequently re-established the BDSS and fielded his own "Bosniak List" in the 2022 elections for the Bosniak National Council. In announcing his list, he said that the council had become an ineffective voice for the Bosniak community due to the machinations of Serbian state authorities and the complicity of the council's own leadership. With reference to the three main political movements in the Bosniak community, he said, "[The SDA] organized Bosniaks politically and culturally, but lately it has lost its compass. The SDP and Rasim Ljajić have not been interested in this story so far, but I welcome the decision to devote themselves to resolving the identity and national rights of Bosniaks. Mufti Muamer Zukorlić left his mark, but what was left behind is generally a bad thing." Ultimately, Džudžo's list did not cross the electoral threshold.

In a 2023 interview, Džudžo credited the Bosniak National Council with promoting the Bosnian language and the cultural legacy of the Bosniak community in its early years, but described the current council as a "painting association," incapable of effective leadership.
