= Zaim Redžepović =

Serbian politician

Member of the National Assembly of the Republic of Serbia
- In office 1 August 2022 – 6 February 2024

Personal details
- Born: 4 September 1980 (age 45) Novi Pazar, SR Serbia, SFR Yugoslavia
- Party: BDZ (2010–13); BDZ Sandžak (2013–17); SPP (2017–24) "Grupa Građana Tutin naš grad (2024–)
- Occupation: Politician

Zaim Redžepović (Serbian Cyrillic: Заим Реџеповић; born 4 September 1980) is a Serbian politician from the country's Bosniak community. He was a secretary of state in Serbia's government for two terms and served in the National Assembly of Serbia from 2022 to 2024.

A longtime member of the Justice and Reconciliation Party (SPP) and its antecedents, Redžepović was excluded from the party in early 2024. He is now leading his own political movement in the 2024 Serbian local elections.

== Early life and career ==
Redžepović was born in Novi Pazar, in the Sandžak region of what was then the Socialist Republic of Serbia in the Socialist Federal Republic of Yugoslavia. He raised in nearby Tutin and is a graduate of the University of Belgrade Faculty of Law.

== Politician ==
=== Early years ===
Redžepović joined the Bosniak Democratic Union (BDZ) on its formation in 2010. He appeared in the second position on the party's electoral list for the Tutin municipal assembly in the 2012 Serbian local elections and was elected when the list won nine mandates, finishing second against the Party of Democratic Action of Sandžak (SDA Sandžak), which won a majority victory with twenty-nine seats. Early in 2013, the BDZ experienced a split between supporters of party leader Emir Elfić and Chief Mufti Muamer Zukorlić. Redžepović sided with Zukorlić, whose faction coalesced as the Bosniak Democratic Union of Sandžak (BDZ Sandžak) later in the year.

The BDZ Sandžak contested the 2014 Serbian parliamentary election on the electoral list of the Liberal Democratic Party (LDP), and Redžepović was given the twenty-fifth position. The list did not cross the electoral threshold for assembly representation.

Redžepović received the second position on the BDZ Sandžak's list for the 2016 local elections in Tutin and was re-elected when it won six mandates, finishing in third place. He also appeared in the fifth position on the party's list in the concurrent 2016 parliamentary election and was not elected when the list won two mandates.

=== Secretary of State ===
The Serbian Progressive Party (SNS) and its allies won a majority victory in the 2016 parliamentary election, and the BDZ Sandžak afterward supported SNS leader Aleksandar Vučić's government in the assembly. At Zukorlić's recommendation, Redžepović was appointed in October 2016 to a secretary of state position in the Serbian ministry of labour, employment, veterans affairs, and social policy. He resigned his seat in the municipal assembly two months later. His first term as a secretary of state continued until 2020.

The BDZ Sandžak was reconstituted as the Justice and Reconciliation Party in 2017. The following year, Redžepović became the leader of the SPP's municipal board in Tutin. He appeared in the seventh position on Zukorlić's list in the 2018 election for the Bosniak National Council and was elected when the list won thirteen mandates, finishing second against a list affiliated with the SDA.

Redžepović led the SPP's list in Tutin for the 2020 local elections and was elected to a third term when the list won eleven mandates, finishing second against the SDA. He also appeared in the eighth position on the party's list in the 2020 parliamentary election and was not elected when the party won four mandates. The SPP again supported Serbia's SNS-led administration after the election, and in May 2021 Redžepović was appointed as a secretary of state in Serbia's ministry of agriculture, forestry, and water economy.

=== Parliamentarian ===
Zedžepović was promoted to the third position on the SPP's electoral list in the 2022 parliamentary election and was elected when the list won three mandates. During his parliamentary term, he was a deputy member of the assembly committee on human and minority rights and gender equality and the European Union–Serbia stabilization and association committee. He was chosen as a vice-president of the SPP in July 2022.

Redžepović did not seek re-election to the Bosniak National Council in 2022 and was not a candidate in the 2023 Serbian parliamentary election.

=== Departure from the SPP ===
There were several attempts to establish a coalition government between the SDA and SPP in Tutin after the 2020 municipal election, but these were not successful, due in part to divisions among the local SPP. In early January 2024, the SDA administration in Tutin was overturned by a new assembly majority that included the SPP, and Bajro Gegić of the independent group "Tutin in First Place" was chosen as mayor. The local SPP leadership clarified afterward that the party was not joining the government but had supported Gegić to remove the previous SDA mayor, Salih Hot, from power.

The SPP began disciplinary proceedings against Redžepović after the change in government, charging that he had agreed to join Gegić's administration without the party's approval. Redžepović rejected the charge as untrue, saying that he had not joined Gegić's administration but had initiated discussions on the creation of a new assembly majority. He added that he supported the SPP's decision to cooperate with the SDA, notwithstanding the recent change in government in Tutin. The SPP leadership did not accept his explanation and excluded him from the party on 5 February 2024.

In March 2024, Redžepović announced that he would lead his own political movement in Tutin for the 2024 Serbian local elections. He later launched the local "Our Choice" (Naš Izbor) party, which he has described as uploading the political legacy of SPP founder Muamer Zukorlić.
