= Meho Omerović =

Serbian politician

Meho Omerović (Serbian Cyrillic: Мехо Омеровић; born August 9, 1959) is a politician in Serbia. He served in the National Assembly of Serbia continuously from 2001 to 2018. Omerović is a member of the Social Democratic Party of Serbia (SDPS).

== Early life and career ==
Omerović was born in Goražde, then part of the People's Republic of Bosnia and Herzegovina in the Federal People's Republic of Yugoslavia, and is of Bosniak origin. His family were Partisans in World War II; his father was subsequently a professional truck driver and his mother a homemaker. Raised in Goražde, Omerović moved to Belgrade in 1978 and graduated from the University of Belgrade Faculty of Political Sciences in 1983 with a focus in international affairs.

== Political career ==
Politically active from a young age, Omerović worked for the presidency of the Central Committee of the League of Communists of Yugoslavia (CC SKJ) from 1985 until the infamous 14th Congress of the League of Communists of Yugoslavia in 1990. An opponent of Slobodan Milošević at the congress, he was subsequently a candidate of Vesna Pešić's Civic Alliance of Serbia in the 1992 Serbian parliamentary election, appearing in the thirty-third position on the party's electoral list in Belgrade. The party did not cross the electoral threshold to win any mandates.

Omerović was a founding member of Social Democracy in 1997 and appeared in the second position on the party's electoral list for Kraljevo in the 1997 Serbian election. Once again, the party did not cross the electoral threshold.

In 2000, Omerović emerged as a prominent critic of the Milošević regime, working organize anti-government rallies and to unite opposition parties into the Democratic Opposition of Serbia (DOS).

=== Member of the National Assembly ===
==== Social Democracy (2001–02) ====
Serbia's electoral system was reformed for the 2000 parliamentary election, with the entire country becoming a single electoral division; as before, members were elected by proportional representation. Omerović received the ninety-fifth position on the Democratic Opposition of Serbia's list and was awarded a mandate after the list won a landslide victory with 176 out of 250 seats. (From 2000 to 2011, parliamentary mandates were awarded to sponsoring parties or coalitions rather than to individual candidates and were often distributed out of numerical order. Omerović did not automatically receive a mandate by virtue of his position on the list, but he was included in the DOS's assembly delegation all the same.) In April 2001, Omerović indicated that a deputy from the far-right Serbian Radical Party had used an ethnic slur against him in an assembly debate.

Social Democracy split into two factions in May 2001, after Omerović and several others accused party leader Vuk Obradović of sexually harassing a female colleague. Obradović's faction attempted to purge Omerović from the party, without success. Omerović became secretary of the anti-Obradović faction and successfully petitioned the Serbian justice ministry to recognize Slobodan Orlić as party leader pending a resolution as to which group held the legal right to the name. In April 2002, Omerović's wing of Social Democracy merged into a new group called the Social Democratic Party (not to be confused with another party of the same name founded in 2014).

==== Social Democratic Party (2002–07) ====
In May 2002, Omerović represented the Social Democratic Party in talks between the DOS and the Kosovo Serb Return Coalition on the latter's future in Kosovo politics. He later advocated for the Democratic Opposition of Serbia to support Dragoljub Mićunović in the December 2002 Serbian presidential election. (Mićunović did not run in this campaign, although he was a candidate in the subsequent 2003 election.)

Omerović chaired the Serbian assembly's committee for inter-ethnic relations in 2003. In August of that year, he stated that Albanian terrorist groups in Kosovo were undertaking ethnic cleansing against Serbs and other non-Albanians and urged the United Nations Security Council to take meaningful action to ensure "the disarmament of all those who have weapons and unlawfully carry them, as well as the undertaking of measures to protect all ethnic communities, especially the Serbs."

The Social Democratic Party contested the 2003 Serbian parliamentary election as part of an alliance led by the G17 Plus party. Omerović received the 163rd position on the alliance's electoral list (which was mostly arranged in alphabetical order) and, when the list won thirty-four mandates, was one of three Social Democratic Party candidates selected to serve in the assembly.

The following month, he announced that the Social Democratic Party members would leave the G17 Plus parliamentary group to sit as independents, although he rejected the suggestion that this was due to a rift between the parties. The SDP initially aligned itself with G17 Plus in supporting the coalition government led by Vojislav Koštunica.

Omerović continued to serve on the assembly committee for inter-ethnic relations in the new parliament. He defended of the rights Kosovo Serbs following the 2004 ethnic unrest in the disputed territory.

In December 2004, the three Social Democratic Party MPs and the delegates of the Socialist Party of Serbia were the only assembly members to vote against a bill granting the same rights to Chetnik as to Partisan World War II veterans. These two parties later took part in negotiations for a merger; during this time, Omerović recommended that the new party take the name of the Social Democratic Party, as the Socialist Party name was tarnished by its association with the Milošević era. Ultimately, the merger did not happen.

The Social Democratic Party refused to support the Koštunica government's bills on pensions and oil industry in August 2005, and Omerović, along with one of his SDP colleagues, moved into opposition (the third SDP deputy continued to support the government and left the party). In December of the same year, both SDP members joined a new parliamentary group called "For European Serbia." From the opposition benches, Omerović spoke against the Koštunica government's privatization agenda.

==== Sandžak Democratic Party (2007–09) ====
Omerović subsequently left the Social Democratic Party and joined the Sandžak Democratic Party, a Bosniak party led by Rasim Ljajić. The party contested the 2007 Serbian parliamentary election on the list of the Democratic Party, and Omerović received the 180th position; as before, the list was mostly alphabetical. He was again chosen for an assembly position when the list won sixty-four mandates and, as before, served as an opposition member. In September 2007, he accused the rival List for Sandžak alliance of creating an "international scandal" by banning a FoNet journalist from an event in Novi Pazar. He later blamed both elements in Koštunica's government and Sulejman Ugljanin's Party of Democratic Action of Sandžak for growing unrest in the Sandžak region.

In October 2007, Omerović accused Serbian police of failing to protect the rights of Muslims in Loznica, following an attack on a home where Muslim ceremonies were performed. He was quoted as saying, "The perpetrators of the act are unknown, while the police have said that they will suspend the investigation, and have advised Muslims in the area to simply put bars up on the doors and windows of buildings where ceremonies are performed. It is sending the signal that Muslims are not welcome here."

The Sandžak Democratic Party contested the 2008 Serbian parliamentary election on the Democratic Party's For a European Serbia alliance list, and Omerović received the 154th position. The alliance won 102 out of 250 mandates to emerge as the largest party in the assembly, and Omerović was again awarded a mandate, serving for his fourth term. After the election, he represented the Sandžak Democratic Party in negotiations for a new government; the party ultimately joined a coalition ministry led by the Democratic Party. Tensions remained high between the Sandžak Democratic Party and Sulejman Ugljanin's party during this period, and Omerović was a frequent critic of the latter group. He also accused Sandžak Mufti Muamer Zukorlić of seeking to inflame divisions between Bosniaks and Serbs in the region.

Omerović chaired the committee on labour and social affairs during this sitting of the assembly. In January 2009, he took part in talks for co-operation between the Sandžak Democratic Party and Bulgaria's Movement for Rights and Freedoms, a party representing the interests of Turks in Bulgaria and Bulgarian Muslims.

==== Social Democratic Party of Serbia (2009–18) ====
Alliance with Democratic Party (2009–12)

Rasim Ljajić established the Social Democratic Party of Serbia as a country-wide political party in 2009, with the Sandžak Democratic Party continuing to operate in the Sandžak as a regional ally. Omerović was a founding member of the new party and served in parliament under its banner from 2009 to 2018. He remains a member of the Sandžak Democratic Party at the regional level.

In January 2010, Omerović encouraged the Serbian parliament to pass a resolution on the 1995 Srebrenica massacre as a means of promoting reconciliation in the region. He later welcomed a ruling from the International Criminal Tribunal for the former Yugoslavia that identified the massacre as constituting genocide.

He supported Serbia's bid to join the European Union and, during this time, argued in favour of the country joining the North Atlantic Treaty Organization (NATO). He served on the assembly's defence and security committee and, in August 2010, strongly argued against regional politicians promoted the idea of renewing Sandžak's autonomy and possibly annexing the region to Bosnia and Herzegovina.

Omerović strongly opposed a 2011 bill allowing members of the Axis-aligned Hungarian Army in Vojvodina during World War II to claim compensation or restitution for properties nationalized by Yugoslavia's communist authorities between 1945 and 1968. He was quoted as saying that he did not want "the collaborators of the occupiers and losers in World War II to be rehabilitated."

Serbia's electoral system was reformed once again in 2011, such that parliamentary mandates were awarded in numerical order to candidates on successful lists. Omerović received the fortieth position on the Democratic Party–led Choice for a Better Life list in the 2012 parliamentary election and was re-elected when the list won sixty-seven mandates. Following the election, the SDPS joined a new coalition government led by the Serbian Progressive Party and the Socialist Party of Serbia.

Alliance with the Progressive Party (2012–present)

After the 2012 election, Omerović became the chair of the assembly's human rights committee and a member of Serbia's delegation to the Parliamentary Assembly of the Organization for Security and Co-operation in Europe (OSCE PA). He paid tribute to veteran Serbian human rights activist Vojin Dimitrijević following the latter's death in 2012, saying that Serbia had "lost a great man, a big fighter for civic society and for the state of law in which there would be no second-class citizens." He later condemned interim Bosniac National Council president Esad Džudžević's call for Bosniaks to drop the Serbian suffixes -ić and -vić from their names, saying, "Džudžević has every right to call himself whatever he likes; he can change or shorten his family name, but to dictate to a whole nation to change their family names is repression. [..] This only shows a sick desire to be present in the media at all costs [...] From this day, he is the champion of nonsense."

The SDPS contested the 2014 parliamentary election on the Progressive Party's Aleksandar Vučić — Future We Believe In list. Omerović received the eightieth position on the list and was re-elected when it won a landslide victory with 158 mandates. Following the election, he supported a government bill to criminalize unauthorized participation in international conflicts, saying, "Given the recent experience of several young people, Bosniaks from Sandžak, participating in the Syrian conflict and returning homes in coffins, we assessed that it was the right moment for Serbia to introduce this criminal offence so that all those who do this in the future are prosecuted for it." Omerović continued to serve as chair of the human rights committee (renamed as the human and minority rights and gender equality committee) and was vocal in his support of the rights of the LGBT population of Serbia. In late 2014, he condemned pamphlets from the ultra-right group Serbian Action attacking Serbia's Roma population.

During the 2016 parliamentary election campaign, Omerović condemned Sulejman Ugljanin for requesting that the United Nations Security Council send international forces to the Sandžak to "protect the Bosniak people in this part of Serbia." Omerović was quoted as saying, "Ugljanin has in the crudest possible way abused the [Bosniac National Council], put it into the function of his sick desire to preserve a bit of some sort of power, at the cost of spreading fear. This insane call is only a confirmation that the man has lost all contact with reality. The rhetoric of representing the situation in Sandžak as a place ruled by terror, repression and assimilation is seriously sick, but also very dangerous."

Omerović was promoted to the seventieth position on the Progressive Party–led electoral list in the 2016 election and was returned for a seventh term when the list won a second consecutive majority with 131 mandates. He continued to chair the committee on human and minority rights and gender equality in this sitting of parliament and was a member of the security services control committee; a deputy member of the committee on administrative, budgetary, mandate, and immunity issues; a member of Serbia's delegation to the OSCE PA; the head of Serbia's parliamentary friendship group with Iran; and a member of the parliamentary friendship groups with Austria, Azerbaijan, Bosnia and Herzegovina, China, and Indonesia.

Omerović resigned from the assembly on 17 July 2018, after having been arrested the previous month for failing to pay for cosmetics at an airport shop in Frankfurt, Germany. In the aftermath of the incident, Omerović said that he had left the shop due to the sudden onset of a serious health issue, that he did not initially realize he was still holding the items, and that he returned to the shop intending to purchase them, at which time he was arrested. He was also reported to have called for diplomatic immunity on being arrested; this was seen as a source of embarrassment for the Serbian government, but Omerović has said that he never made this request. Fellow parliamentarian Đorđe Vukadinović noted that Omerović had faced strong pressure to resign prior to announcing his decision.

=== Municipal ===
Omerović has been a member of the Assembly of the City of Belgrade.
