= Muamer Bačevac =

Serbian politician

Muamer Bačevac (Serbian Cyrillic: Муамер Бачевац; born 24 June 1977) is a politician in Serbia from the country's Bosniak community. He is a prominent figure in the municipal government of Novi Pazar and has served in the National Assembly of Serbia since 2014 as a member of the Social Democratic Party of Serbia (SDPS).

== Private career ==
Bačevac is a medical doctor in private life. He lives in the Sandžak city of Novi Pazar.

== Politician ==
=== Municipal politics ===
Bačevac first became politically active in Novi Pazar as a member of Rasim Ljajić's Sandžak Democratic Party (SDP). In 2008, he was one of the party's contenders for selection as mayor. The following year, he introduced a motion in the Novi Pazar municipal assembly that led to the dismissal of mayor Mirsad Đerlek and his replacement by Ljajić ally Meho Mahmutović. He was also the chair of the SDP's Novi Pazar committee in this time, and in this capacity he rejected calls by the rival Party of Democratic Action of Sandžak for a coalition government.

Bačevac has continued to serve in the Novi Pazar municipal assembly after his election to parliament, winning re-election in the 2012, 2016, and 2020 local elections as a member of the SDP's For a European Novi Pazar electoral lists. The SDP won each election and has remained the dominant force in the municipal government throughout this time,

In February 2016, while serving as leader of the Sandžak Democratic Party group in the assembly, Bačevac spearheaded the passage of a motion condemning the political rehabilitation of fascist and quisling figures from World War II. Bačevac specifically condemned the rehabilitation of Draža Mihailović and Milan Nedić as an instance of historical revisionism and highlighted the anti-fascist legacy of the Bosniak people.

In early 2020, Bačevac indicated that the SDP and Muamer Zukorlić's Justice and Reconciliation Party had begun working toward co-operation in the previous year following an earlier period of enmity. Both parties were aligned with the Progressive Party at the republic level.

=== Parliamentarian ===
Rasim Ljajić established the Social Democratic Party of Serbia as a political party at the republic level in 2009, with the Sandžak Democratic Party continuing to operate in the Sandžak as a regional affiliate. For the 2014 Serbian parliamentary election, the SDPS joined the Aleksandar Vučić — Future We Believe In electoral alliance led by the Serbian Progressive Party. Bačevac received the seventieth position on the alliance's list and was elected when the list won a landslide victory with 158 out of 250 mandates. He was promoted to the fortieth position in the 2016 election for the successor Aleksandar Vučić – Serbia Is Winning list and was again returned when the alliance won 131 mandates.

During the 2016–20 parliament, Bačevac was a member of the assembly's health and family committee and the European integration committee; the head of Serbia's parliamentary friendship group with Ukraine; and a member of the parliamentary friendship groups for Austria, Azerbaijan, Bosnia and Herzegovina, Croatia, Germany, Iran, Montenegro, Morocco, Norway, Pakistan, Spain, Turkey, the United Arab Emirates, the United Kingdom, and the United States of America.

He again received the fortieth position on the Progressive Party's list in the 2020 Serbian parliamentary election and was elected to a third term when the list won a landslide majority with 188 mandates. He is now the chair of the assembly's committee on human and minority rights and gender equality; a member of the European integration committee; a deputy member of the committee on finance, state budget, and control of public spending; the head of Serbia's parliamentary friendship group with Turkey; and a member of the friendship groups with Albania, Azerbaijan, Bosnia and Herzegovina, Croatia, France, Germany, Iran, Japan, Kuwait, Mauritius, Montenegro, Morocco, Palestine, Saudi Arabia, Sweden, Ukraine, the United Arab Emirates, and Uzbekistan.
