= Bajro Gegić =

Serbian politician

Member of the National Assembly of the Republic of Serbia
- In office 11 August 2016 – 3 August 2020
- In office 31 May 2012 – 16 April 2014

Mayor of Tutin
- In office 9 January 2024 – 24 April 2024
- Preceded by: Salih Hot
- Succeeded by: Refadija Ademović
- In office 2008 – 21 June 2012
- Preceded by: Šemsudin Kučević
- Succeeded by: Šemsudin Kučević

Personal details
- Born: December 15, 1954 (age 71) Tutin, PR Serbia, FPR Yugoslavia
- Party: SDA (until 2020) "Tutin in First Place" (2020–present)
- Occupation: Politician

Bajro Gegić (Serbian Cyrillic: Бајро Гегић; born 15 December 1954) is a Serbian politician from the country's Bosniak community. He has been the mayor of Tutin on two occasions and has served two terms in the National Assembly of Serbia. A member of the Party of Democratic Action of Sandžak (SDA) for many years, he left the party in 2020 to form his own local political group.

== Early life and private career ==
Gegić was born in Tutin, in the Sandžak region of what was then the People's Republic of Serbia in the Federal People's Republic of Yugoslavia. Raised in the community, he graduated in mathematics from the Faculty of Natural Science and Mathematics, was a professor for more than twenty years, and then worked as an education inspector.

== Politician ==
=== Party of Democratic Action of Sandžak ===
The SDA-led List for Sandžak (LZS) alliance won a majority victory in Tutin in the 2004 Serbian local elections, and Gegić was afterward appointed as the municipality's deputy mayor. He served in this role for the next four years, working under the directly elected mayor Šemsudin Kučević. He was also appointed as a secretary of state in Serbia's education ministry in 2005, after the LZS agreed to support Serbian prime minister Vojislav Koštunica's administration, and served until 2008.

Gegić appeared in the thirteenth position on the LZS's electoral list in the 2007 Serbian parliamentary election and the eleventh position on the successor "Bosniak List for a European Sandžak" in the 2008 parliamentary election. On each occasion, the list won two mandates and he was not given a seat. (From 2000 to 2011, mandates in Serbian parliamentary elections were awarded to sponsoring parties or coalitions rather than individual candidates, and it was common practice for the mandates to be assigned out of numerical order. Gegić could have been awarded a mandate on either occasion, though ultimately he was not.)

The direct election of mayors was abandoned with the 2008 Serbian local elections. The SDA won another majority victory in Tutin in this cycle, and Kučević was chosen by the elected delegates for another term as mayor. He resigned shortly thereafter to become a deputy director in Serbia's Office for Sustainable Development of Underdeveloped Areas. Gegić was named as Kučević's successor and served as mayor for the remainder of the four-year term. While in office, he oversaw the establishment of the first windmill in Serbia, in the village of Leskova, and announced plans for more wind turbines in the area. In 2010, he articulated the municipality's infrastructural challenges in an interview with Danas.

==== Parliamentarian ====
===== First term (2012–14) and after =====
Serbia's electoral system was reformed in 2011, such that assembly mandates were awarded to candidates on successful lists in numerical order. The SDA fielded its own list in the 2012 parliamentary election; Gegić was given the second position and was elected when the party won two mandates. SDA leader Sulejman Ugljanin was re-appointed as a minister without portfolio in Serbia's government after the election, and the SDA supported the administration in the assembly. In his first term, Gegić was a member of the parliamentary friendship groups with Azerbaijan, Bosnia and Herzegovina, Cyprus, Germany, Montenegro, Tunisia, and Turkey.

Gegić also received the second position (after Kučević) on the SDA's list for the Tutin municipal assembly in the 2012 local elections and was re-elected when the list won another majority victory with twenty-one out of thirty-seven mandates. Kučević was again chosen as mayor, and Gegić resigned from the local assembly on 21 June 2012.

He was dropped to the ninth position on the SDA's list for the 2014 parliamentary election and, as the party won only three seats, was not re-elected. He was later given the second position on the SDA's "For Bosniak Unity" list in the 2014 election for the Bosniak National Council and was elected when the list won a majority victory with nineteen out of thirty-five seats. Gegić also served on the presidency of the SDA in this period, although he stood down in January 2015. It was reported at this time that there were serious divisions in the SDA's Tutin branch between supporters of Kučević and supporters of Gegić.

===== Second term (2016–20) =====
Gegić was given the fourth position on the SDA's list in the 2016 parliamentary election and was not initially elected when the list won two seats. He received a mandate on 10 August 2016, after Ugljanin resigned and the third-ranked candidate declined to serve. The Serbian Progressive Party (SNS) and its allies won a majority victory in this election, and the SDA sat in opposition for the term that followed in an assembly group with the Liberal Democratic Party (LDP) and the League of Social Democrats of Vojvodina (LSV). Gegić was a member of the parliamentary committee on constitutional and legislative issues and a deputy member of the education committee (Note: Formally known as the Committee on Education, Science, Technological Development, and the Information Society.) and the health and family committee.

Notwithstanding his rivalry with Kučević, Gegić once again received the second position on the SDA's list for Tutin in the 2016 local elections and was re-elected when the party won another majority victory with twenty-two seats. This time, he remained a member of the local assembly for the entire term that followed. Kučević died in a car accident in 2017, and Kenan Hot was chosen as his successor.

Gegić did not seek re-election to the Bosniak National Council in 2018.

=== "Tutin in First Place" ===
Gegić was expelled from the SDA in February 2020 after organizing his own electoral list in Tutin for the 2020 Serbian local elections. The list, known as "Tutin in First Place," won five out of thirty-seven seats, as the SDA fell below an absolute majority in the municipality for the first time since 1996. Gegić appeared in the lead position on his party's list and was re-elected to the local assembly. The SDA continued to lead the local administration with Salih Hot in the role of mayor. Gegić was not a candidate in the 2020 Serbian parliamentary election, and his term in the national assembly ended in that year.

The Tutin SDA was extremely divided in the term that followed, and in late 2022 it was reported that the local parliament had become completely dysfunctional. In November 2022, Gegic's party and the Sandžak Democratic Party (SDP) joined the local government to provide it with a working majority. This proved to be a short-lived solution, however, and the assembly was unable to meet for several months in 2023 due to a lack of quorum.

In January 2024, the assembly removed Salih Hot as mayor and, by a narrow majority, chose Gegić as his replacement. Gegić was supported by his own party and by the Justice and Reconciliation Party (SPP), the Sandžak Democratic Party, the Serbian Progressive Party, and one former SDA delegate. The SPP clarified afterward that it was not joining the government but had supported Gegić to remove the previous municipal leadership from power. During his second term, Gegić opened the "Sunce" kindergarten school in the municipality.

His second term in office did not last long. In April 2024, the SDA formed a new assembly majority with two former SPP delegates. Gegić was removed as mayor, and Refadija Ademović of the SDA was chosen in his place.

Gegić is currently leading the "Tutin in First Place" list in the 2024 Serbian local elections.

== Personal life ==
His surname is derived from Albanian ethnic subgroup of Ghegs.
