= Mirza Hajdinović =

Serbian politician

Member of the National Assembly of the Republic of Serbia
- In office 24 September 2024 – 24 September 2024

Personal details
- Born: July 2, 1977 (age 48)
- Party: SDA

Mirza Hajdinović (Serbian Cyrillic: Мирза Хајдиновић; Albanian: Mirza Hajdini; born 2 July 1977) is a Serbian politician and administrator from the country's Bosniak community. He is the current secretary of Serbia's Bosniak National Council (BNV), a position he previously held from 2017 to 2022.

Hajdinović briefly served in Serbia's national assembly in September 2024. He is a member of the Party of Democratic Action of Sandžak (SDA).

== Private career ==
Hajdinović has a master's degree in journalism and communicology. He lives in Novi Pazar.

== Politician and administrator ==
Hajdinović has been a prominent member of the SDA organization for many years and has held party positions including member of the Novi Pazar committee, member of the main board, and member of the supervisory board. He does not appear to have held elected public office apart from his brief tenure in the Serbian parliament.

He appeared in the thirteenth position on the SDA's electoral list for the Novi Pazar municipal assembly in the 2004 Serbian local elections. The list won a plurality victory with twenty-one out of forty-seven seats; Hajdinović was not, however, awarded an assembly mandate. (In the 2004 local elections, one-third of assembly mandates were awarded to candidates on successful lists in numerical order, while the remaining two-thirds were assigned at the discretion of the sponsoring parties or coalitions. Hajdinović was not automatically elected, and he did not receive an "optional" mandate.)

Prior to 2010, Serbia's national minority councils were chosen by electoral colleges of community representatives. Hajdinović was an elector for the Bosniak National Council in this period. The Serbian government introduced direct elections for most councils, including the BNV, in 2010.

Hajdinović was appointed as secretary of the BNV in late 2017, replacing Ahmedin Škrijelj. In November 2018, he took part in a BNV delegation that met with Bakir Izetbegović, chairman of the presidency of Bosnia and Herzegovina, in Sarajevo.

He received the thirty-first position on a SDA-affiliated list in the 2018 BNV election. The list won fourteen seats, and he was not elected. The SDA formed a coalition administration with the Sandžak Democratic Party (SDP) after the election, and Hajdinović was chosen for a new term as the BNV's secretary.

Hajdinović was given the seventh position on the SDA's list in the 2020 Serbian parliamentary election and was not elected when the list won three mandates. He later received the twenty-seventh position on the SDA's list in the 2022 BNV election and was again not elected when the party fell to ten seats. The SDA formed a new coalition administration with the Justice and Reconciliation Party (SPP) after the election. Hajdinović's term as BNV secretary ended in December 2022, and he was replaced by Samer Jusović.

He appeared in the third position on the SDA's list in the 2023 Serbian parliamentary election and narrowly missed direct election when the list won two seats. In August 2024, the party's lead candidate Selma Kučević was required to resign as a legislator after becoming the mayor of Tutin. Hajdinović was the next candidate in sequence to receive a seat; however, the party leadership decided that the mandate would instead go to the fourth-ranked candidate, Minela Kalender. Technically, Hajdinović accepted Kučević's vacated mandate and became a member of assembly on 24 September 2024, but he resigned on the same day, and Kalender was named afterward as his replacement.

He was appointed to a new term as BNV secretary on 23 September 2024, replacing Jusović, amid a turnover in the leadership of that body.

== Personal life ==
Hajdinović's surname stems from his grandfather Hajdin Dreshaj who was related to Bilall Dreshaj.
