= Ahmedin Škrijelj =

Serbian politician (born 1982)

- Ахмедин Шкријељ

Member of the National Assembly of the Republic of Serbia
- Incumbent
- Assumed office 6 February 2024

Personal details
- Born: 8 August 1982 (age 44) Novi Pazar, SR Serbia, SFR Yugoslavia
- Party: SDAS

Ahmedin Škrijelj (Serbian Cyrillic: Ахмедин Шкријељ; Albanian: Ahmedin Shkreli; born 8 August 1982) is a Serbian Bosniak politician. He was the deputy mayor of Novi Pazar from 2012 to 2013 and has served in the Serbian parliament since February 2024. Škrijelj is a member of the Party of Democratic Action of Sandžak (SDA).

== Early life and career ==
Škrijelj was born in Novi Pazar, in the Sandžak region of what was then the Socialist Republic of Serbia in the Socialist Federal Republic of Yugoslavia to an ethnic Albanian family from the Shkreli tribe. He received a bachelor's degree in law and economics and afterward studied for a master's degree in international law at the University of Kragujevac. He holds a master of political science degree.

== Politician ==
=== Early years in Novi Pazar ===
Škrijelj appeared in the thirty-first position on the SDA's electoral list for the Novi Pazar municipal assembly in the 2004 Serbian local elections and was given a mandate after the list won a plurality victory with twenty-one out of forty-seven seats. (In the 2004 local elections, one-third of assembly mandates were awarded to candidates on successful lists in numerical order while the remaining two-thirds were distributed amongst other candidates at the discretion of the sponsoring parties or coalitions. Škrijelj received one of the SDA's "optional" mandates.)

Mayors were directly elected in the 2004 local elections, resulting in a divided administration in Novi Pazar: SDA leader Sulejman Ugljanin won the mayoral contest, but the rival Sandžak Democratic Party (SDP) was able to form a coalition government with smaller parties in the local assembly. Škriljelj served as a member of the opposition in his first term. The political climate in the city was extremely tense in this period.

The government of Serbia introduced a provisional administration to Novi Pazar on 7 April 2006 on the grounds that the assembly did not adopt a budget within the legal deadline. A new assembly election was scheduled for 10 September 2006. Zekirija Dugopoljac of the Reformists of Sandžak was appointed to lead a five-member provisional council responsible for carrying out the work of the assembly; Škrijelj was appointed as one of the council's members. When the assembly vote took place, the SDA won a majority victory with twenty-seven seats. Škrijelj was again included on the SDA's list and was elected for a second term.

Serbia abandoned the direct election of mayors with the 2008 local elections; since this time, mayors have been chosen by the elected members of local assemblies. Škrijelj once again appeared on the SDA's list for Novi Pazar in 2008 and received a mandate for a third term when the list won eighteen seats. The SDP's alliance won the election with twenty-three seats and formed a coalition government with a local alliance of Serb parties, and the SDA returned to its role in opposition.

Škrijlej also received the twenty-first position on the SDA-led Bosniak List for a European Sandžak in the 2008 Serbian parliamentary election, which was held concurrently with the local vote. The list won two seats, and he was not chosen for a mandate. (From 2000 to 2011, mandates in Serbian parliamentary elections were awarded to sponsoring parties or coalitions rather than individual candidates, and it was common practice for the mandates to be assigned out of numerical order. Škrijelj could have been included in the Bosniak List's assembly delegation despite his relatively low list position, though ultimately he was not.)

In January 2011, Škrijelj publicly urged the SDP to form a new government with the SDA in Novi Pazar, citing a recent alliance of the parties in Sjenica.

Serbia's electoral system was reformed in 2011, such that all assembly mandates were awarded to candidates on successful lists in numerical order. Škrijelj appeared in the second position on the SDA's list for Novi Pazar in the 2012 local elections and was re-elected when the list won fourteen seats. He also appeared in the fifth position on the SDA's list in the concurrent 2012 parliamentary election and was not elected when the list won two mandates.

The SDP's alliance narrowly won the 2012 city election in Novi Pazar but fell well short of a majority and ultimately formed a grand coalition with the SDA. Škrijelj was chosen as deputy mayor on 15 June 2012. The alliance between the two historical rivals did not last long, however, and in February 2013 the SDP formed a new governing coalition without the SDA. Škrijelj left office on 21 February 2013, remarking that any SDA officials not formally dismissed by the new city administration would resign out of party solidarity.

Škrijelj appeared in the eighth position on the SDA's list in the 2014 Serbian parliamentary election and was not elected when the list won three mandates.

=== Bosniak National Council ===
Prior to 2010, Serbia's national minority councils were chosen by electoral colleges of community representatives. Škrijelj was an elector for the Bosniak National Council (BNV) in this period. The Serbian government introduced direct elections for the BNV and most other national councils in 2010.

On 17 November 2014, Škrijelj was chosen as secretary of the BNV. He held his role until late 2017, when he was replaced by Mirza Hajdinović.

Škrijelj received the honorary thirty-fifth and final position on a SDA-affiliated list in the 2018 BNV election. Election from this position was a mathematical impossibility, and he was not elected when the list won fourteen seats. Following the election, the SDA and SDP joined forces to govern the council, and SDA delegate Esad Džudžo was chosen as council president. Škrijelj became the legal representative of the SDA's council group.

In June 2019, the BNV presented an address to the governments of Serbia and Montenegro calling for the Sandžak to receive special self-governing status. Džudžo distanced himself from the address, saying that it had been made without his knowledge or support. Subsequently, SDA leader Sulejman Ugljanin endorsed the call for special status, and some leading SDA officials called for Džudžo to resign. In the midst of this controversy, Škrijelj accused Serbian president Aleksandar Vučić and his administration of undermining the Bosniak community's legitimate requests and Džudžo of enabling the administration's policy. Džudžo, for his part, rejected the calls to resign and described the special status initiative as the work of a pro-Albanian faction operating within the SDA. The BNV ultimately removed Džudžo as leader and replaced him with Jasmina Curić, although the special status initiative did not gain much traction and did not come to fruition.

=== Return to political life ===
Škrijelj received the third position on the SDA's list for the Novi Pazar city assembly in the 2020 local elections and was elected to a fifth local assembly term when the list won nine seats, finishing third against the SDP and the Justice and Reconciliation Party (SPP). The SDP formed a new coalition government after the election, and Škrijelj led the SDA's group in opposition. His term lasted until the assembly was dissolved for an early election on 30 October 2023.

He received the fifth position on the SDA's list in the 2020 parliamentary election and was not elected when the list won three seats. In the 2022 parliamentary election, he was given the third position and narrowly missed election when the list won two seats.

=== Parliamentarian ===
Škrijelj was promoted to the second position on the SDA's list for the 2023 parliamentary election and was elected to the national assembly when the list won two seats. He took his seat when the new assembly convened in February 2024. The Serbian Progressive Party (SNS) and its allies won the election, and the SDA serves in opposition. During an assembly debate on the new ministry, Škrijelj said the government would not be legitimate because the election had been "stolen" and described Bosniaks in the SNS-led administration as "private Bosniaks of the government."

The SDA is currently part of a parliamentary group with the Movement of Free Citizens (PSG) and the Party for Democratic Action (PDD). Škrijelj is the group's deputy leader. He is also a member of an assembly working group for the improvement of the electoral process and a member of the parliamentary friendship groups with Bosnia and Herzegovina, France, Germany, India, Italy and the Holy See, Norway, the countries of Southeast Asia, (Note: Brunei Darussalam, Cambodia, Indonesia, Laos, Malaysia, Myanmar, the Philippines, Singapore, Thailand, and Vietnam.) and the United States of America, as well as the friendship group with Australia, New Zealand, and the Pacific Ocean countries. (Note: Fiji, Nauru, Palau, Papua New Guinea, the Solomon Islands, Tuvalu, and Vanuatu.)

During an assembly debate in July 2024, Škrijelj said that it was an insult to Bosniaks for Serbian parliamentarians to reject the identification of the Srebrenica massacre as an act of genocide.
