= Amela Lukač Zoranić =

Serbian politician

Member of the National Assembly of the Republic of Serbia
- In office 25 November 2021 – 1 August 2022

Personal details
- Born: 15 August 1979 (age 46) Novi Pazar, SR Serbia, SFR Yugoslavia
- Party: BDZ (2010–13); BDZ Sandžak (2013–17); SPP (2017–present)
- Occupation: Politician

Amela Lukač Zoranić (Serbian Cyrillic: Амела Лукач Зоранић; born 15 August 1979), also known simply as Amela Zoranić, is a Serbian academic and politician from the country's Bosniak community. A longtime member of Chief Mufti Muamer Zukorlić's political movement, she served in the National Assembly of Serbia from 2021 to 2022 as a member of the Justice and Reconciliation Party (SPP).

== Early life and academic career ==
Lukač Zoranić was born in Novi Pazar, in the Sandžak region of what was then the Socialist Republic of Serbia in the Socialist Federal Republic of Yugoslavia. She graduated from the University of Priština in 2002 with a degree in English language and literature and later received a master's degree and a Ph.D. from the International University of Novi Pazar. She began working at the International University's department of English language and literature in 2004, was appointed as vice-rector in 2009, and served as dean of the Arts Department from 2019 to 2021.

Her academic work is focused on fields such as Anglo-American literature and culture, critical theory, colonial and postcolonial studies, and cultural studies. She published the English-language poetry collection Lullaby in 2019. Lukač Zoranić has said that her favourite author is William Faulkner and her favourite musician is Leonard Cohen.

== Politician ==
Lukać Zoranić was appointed as secretary-general of Muamer Zukorlic's Bosniak Cultural Community movement in January 2010.

Serbia held the first direct elections for its national minority councils in 2010. The Bosniak Cultural Community contested the elections for the Bosniak National Council and won seventeen mandates, as opposed to thirteen for the Bosniak List led by Sulejman Ugljanin and five for the Bosniak Renaissance group of Rasim Ljajić. Lukač Zoranić was among the candidates elected on Zukorlić's list. The results were extremely contentious, and the legitimacy of the Bosniak Cultural Community's victory was contested by both the Serbian government and Ugljanin's party. Zukorlić's group held a constituent session for the council on 7 July 2010, which was also attended by two delegates from Bosniak Renaissance. This iteration of the council continued to meet afterward but was not recognized by the Serbian government. Lukač Zoranić served as chair of the breakaway council's committee on international co-operation.

=== Bosniak Democratic Union (2010–2012) ===
Lukač Zoranić was a founding member of the Zukorlić-affiliated Bosniak Democratic Union (BDZ) in late 2010. The party contested the 2012 Serbian parliamentary election as part of the All Together (Sve Zajedno) coalition, and she received the sixth position on its electoral list. The list won a single seat, which was automatically assigned to its top-ranked candidate, BDZ leader Emir Elfić. Lukač Zoranić also received the third position on the BDZ's list for the Novi Pazar city assembly in the concurrent 2012 Serbian local elections and was elected when the list won ten mandates.

=== Bosniak Democratic Union of Sandžak (2013–17) ===
The BDZ became divided between supporters of Elfić and supporters of Zukorlić in 2013. Lukač Zoranić sided with Zukorlić and, when the party formally split at the end of the year, joined the breakaway Bosniak Democratic Union of Sandžak (BDZ Sandžak). The latter party contested the 2014 parliamentary election on the list of the Liberal Democratic Party (LDP), and Lukač Zoranić received the eighteenth position. Election from this position was plausible, but the list did not cross the electoral threshold for assembly representation. During the campaign, Lukač Zoranić acknowledged that the LDP and BDZ Sandžak held differing views on LGBTQ issues, saying that the LDP stood for "the rights of the LBGT population" while the BDZS stood for what she described as " the affirmation of [heterosexual] marriage and family." In saying this, she also remarked that it was not required for the parties to agree on all things.

The Serbian government held a new election for the Bosniak National Council in 2014, and Lukač Zoranić received the third position on Zukorlić's For Bosniaks, Sandžak and the Mufti list. The only other list to appear on the ballot was Ugljanin's For Bosniak Unity. Ugljanin's list won the election, nineteen seats to sixteen. Zukorlić's group initially raised concerns about electoral fraud but ultimately accepted the results, and Lukač Zoranić served as a member of the opposition.

The BDZ Sandžak fielded its own list in the 2016 parliamentary election. Lukač Zoranić appeared in the sixth position and was not elected when the list won two seats. She also received the sixth position on the party's list in Novi Pazar for the 2016 local elections and was re-elected when the list again won ten mandates.

=== Justice and Reconciliation Party (2017–present) ===
The BDZ Sandžak was restructured as the Justice and Reconciliation Party in 2017, with Muamer Zukorlić as the party leader. Lukač Zoranić became a member of the new party.

She received the third position on the Mufti's list for the 2018 Bosniak National Council election and was re-elected when the list won thirteen seats. As in 2014, Ugljanin's list narrowly defeated Zukorlić's. After the election, Ugljanin's group formed a coalition with a third list aligned with Ljajić, and Zukorlić's followers remained in opposition.

Lukač Zoranić was given the fifth position on the SPP's list in the 2020 parliamentary election and narrowly missed election when the list won four mandates. She also appeared in the fifth position on the party's list for Novi Pazar in the 2020 local elections and was elected to a third term when the list won eleven seats.

Muamer Zukorlić died on 6 November 2021, and, as the next candidate on the list, Lukač Zoranić was given a mandate in the Serbian national assembly as his replacement on 25 November. During the 2020–22 parliament, the SPP provided outside support to Serbia's government led by the Serbian Progressive Party (SNS), and Lukač Zoranić served as a supporter of the administration.

Muamer Zukorlić's son Usame Zukorlić became SPP leader after his father's death. Lukać Zoranić did not have a good relationship with the new party leadership and was not a candidate in the 2022 parliamentary election. She resigned from all positions in the party in May 2022. She remained a SPP member of the Novi Pazar city assembly until is dissolution in October 2023 but was not a candidate in the special election that followed.
