= Rejhan Kurtović =

Serbian academic and politician

- Рејхан Куртовић

Member of the National Assembly of the Republic of Serbia
- In office 1 May 2024 – 20 May 2024

Personal details
- Born: 12 October 1986 (age 40) Sjenica, SR Serbia, SFR Yugoslavia
- Party: SPP
- Occupation: Politician

Rejhan R. Kurtović (Serbian Cyrillic: Рејхан Р. Куртовић; born 12 October 1986) is a Serbian academic and politician from the country's Bosniak community. He has served in the Serbian national assembly and is currently a state secretary in the Serbian government. Kurtović is a member of the Justice and Reconciliation Party (SPP).

== Early life and career ==
Kurtović was born in Sjenica, in the Sandžak region of what was then the Socialist Republic of Serbia in the Socialist Federal Republic of Yugoslavia. He earned a Bachelor of Laws degree in 2009.

Chief Mufti Muamer Zukorlić's Bosniak Cultural Community opened an office in Sjenica in February 2010, and Kurtović was chosen as its manager. Shortly thereafter, Serbia held its first direct elections for the country's national minority councils. In the election for the Bosniak National Council, the electoral list of Zukorlić's movement won seventeen seats as against thirteen for the Bosniak List led by Sulejman Ugljanin and five for the Bosniak Renaissance list of Rasim Ljajić. The results were extremely contentious, and the legitimacy of the Bosniak Cultural Community's victory was contested by both the Serbian government and Ugljanin's party. Zukorlić's group held a constituent session for the council on 7 July 2010, which was also attended by two delegates from Bosniak Renaissance. This version of the council continued to meet afterward but was not recognized by the Serbian government. In January 2011, Kurtović was chosen as secretary of the breakaway council's committee on the protection of human rights and freedoms.

In 2012, Kurtović defended his master's thesis with the title, "The role of national councils in realizing the rights of members of national minorities." Two years later, he defended a doctoral dissertation with the title, "Minority rights and freedoms in the new international order and legislation of Serbia." He became an assistant professor at the law faculty of Zukorlić's International University of Novi Pazar in 2014 and was promoted to associate professor in 2020. He is also an assistant professor at the University of Travnik and has lectured at the University of Business Engineering and Management in Banja Luka, both of which are in Bosnia and Herzegovina.

=== Politician ===
Kurtović's appeared in the sixth position on the Justice and Reconciliation Party's electoral list in the 2020 Serbian parliamentary election and was not elected when the list won four seats. When the national assembly was dissolved two years later, he was the next SPP candidate in sequence with the right to enter the assembly in the event of a vacancy.

He also appeared in the sixth position on the SPP's list for the Sjenica municipal assembly in the 2020 Serbian local elections, which were held concurrently with the parliamentary vote, and was elected when the list won nine mandates. Although the SPP narrowly lost the vote to the Party of Democratic Action of Sandžak (SDA), it was able to form a local coalition government after the election with support from the Serbian Progressive Party (SNS), the Socialist Party of Serbia (SPS), and other parties. When the assembly convened in August 2020, Kurtović was chosen as its president (i.e., speaker). Three months later, the Party of Democratic Action of Sandžak (SDA) and the Sandžak Democratic Party (SDP) sought to overturn the SPP-led government and form a new administration in Sjenica; their efforts were unsuccessful, and in December 2020 Kurtović announced that the municipality's existing coalition would remain in place.

In September 2022, the SDP joined the municipal governing coalition in Sjenica. Kurtović resigned as assembly president and was replaced by Kamberović.

After the 2022 Serbian parliamentary election (in which Kurtović was not a candidate), the SPP joined Serbia's coalition government led by the SNS. Kurtović was appointed as a secretary of state in the ministry of human and minority rights and social dialogue in November 2022 and resigned from the municipal assembly the following month. Among his responsibilities in his first term as secretary of state was to inaugurate a social housing project specifically directed to the Roma community in Raška in August 2023. In March 2024, he spoke at a conference in Sarajevo on the protection of national minorities, promoting Serbia as a regional leader in the field.

Kurtović appeared in the third position on a coalition list led by the SPP in the 2023 Serbian parliamentary election and was not immediately elected when the list won two seats. He received a mandate on 1 May 2024 as a replacement for party leader Usame Zukorlić, who had been appointed as a minister without portfolio in Serbia's government. In the assembly, Kurtović served on a working group for the improvement of the electoral process.

On 16 May 2024, Kurtović was appointed to a second term as secretary of state in the ministry of human and minority rights and social dialogue. By virtue of holding this role, he was required to resign from the national assembly; his resignation became official on 20 May 2024.

Kurtović was elected as a vice-president of the SPP in 2022 and continues to hold this role as of 2024.

He is currently seeking re-election to the Sjenica municipal assembly in the second position on the SPP's list.
