= Misala Pramenković =

Serbian politician (born 1980)

President of the Bosniak National Council of Serbia
- Incumbent
- Assumed office 26 December 2022
- Preceded by: Jasmina Curić

Member of the National Assembly of the Republic of Serbia
- In office 3 August 2020 – 1 August 2022

Personal details
- Born: 22 December 1980 (age 45) Tutin, SR Serbia, SFR Yugoslavia
- Party: BDZ Sandžak (2013–17); SPP (2017–present)
- Occupation: Politician

Misala Pramenković (Serbian Cyrillic: Мисала Праменковић; born 22 December 1980) is a Serbian politician. An ethnic Bosniak, she served in the National Assembly of Serbia from 2020 to 2022 and has been the president of Serbia's Bosniak National Council since December 2022. Pramenković is a member of the Justice and Reconciliation Party (SPP).

== Early life and private career ==
Pramenković was born in the village of Moroni in Tutin, in the Sandžak region of what was then the Socialist Republic of Serbia in the Socialist Federal Republic of Yugoslavia. She graduated from the Gazi Isa-beg school in Novi Pazar, continued her education at the Faculty of Islamic Studies at the University of Sarajevo in Bosnia and Herzegovina, and earned a master's degree and a Ph.D. from the International University of Novi Pazar. She has published widely in her field.

== Politician ==
=== Early years (2010–20) ===
Serbia organized the first direct elections for its national minority councils in 2010. Pramenković was elected to the Bosniak National Council that year on the electoral list of Chief Mufti Muamer Zukorlić's Bosniak Cultural Community, which won seventeen mandates, as against thirteen for the Bosniak List led by Sulejman Ugljanin and five for the Bosniak Renaissance list of Rasim Ljajić. These results were extremely contentious, and the legitimacy of the Bosniak Cultural Community's victory was contested by both the Serbian government and Ugljanin's party. Zukorlić's group held a constituent session for the council on 7 July 2010, which was also attended by two delegates from Bosniak Renaissance. This iteration of the council continued to meet afterward but was not recognized by the Serbian government.

Pramenković became a member of the Bosniak Democratic Union of Sandžak (BDZ Sandžak) on its formation in 2013. The BDZ Sandžak contested the 2014 Serbian parliamentary election on the Liberal Democratic Party's electoral list, and Pramenković received the 123rd position. The list did not cross the electoral threshold for assembly representation.

The Serbian government organized a new election for the Bosniak National Council in 2014, and Pramenković received the sixth position on Zukorlić's For Bosniaks, Sandžak and the Mufti list. The only other list to appear on the ballot was Ugljanin's For Bosniak Unity. Ugljanin's list won the election, nineteen seats to sixteen. Zukorlić's group initially raised concerns about electoral fraud but ultimately accepted the results, and Pramenković served as a member of the opposition.

Pramenković appeared in the third position on the BDZ Sandžak's list in the 2016 Serbian parliamentary election and narrowly missed election when the list won two seats. She also received the third position on the party's list for the Novi Pazar city assembly in the concurrent 2016 Serbian local elections and was elected when the list won ten seats. The BDZ Sandžak was restructured as the Justice and Reconciliation Party (SPP) in 2017, and she became a member of the new party.

Pramenković was promoted to the third position on Zukorlić's list for the 2018 Bosniak National Council election and was re-elected when the list won thirteen seats. As in 2014, Zukorlić's list was narrowly defeated by Ugljanin's. After the election, the parties of Ugljanin and Rasim Ljajić formed a coalition leadership, and Zukorlić's followers remained in opposition.

=== Parliamentarian (2020–22) ===
Pramenković again received the third position on the SPP's list in the 2020 Serbian parliamentary election and was elected when the list won four mandates. The Serbian Progressive Party (SNS) and its allies won a landslide majority victory in the election, and the SPP afterward supported the government in the assembly. In parliament, Pramenković was a member of the committee on the rights of the child (and its working group for initiatives, petitions, and proposals), a deputy member of the committee on the diaspora and Serbs in the region, and a member of the parliamentary friendship groups with Bosnia and Herzegovina, Kuwait, Saudi Arabia, Syria, Turkey, the United Kingdom, and the United States of America. She attracted some attention as the first elected representative in the Serbian national assembly to wear a hijab. In a 2021 interview, she said that she had not experienced any discrimination on this basis.

She also received the tenth position on the SPP's list for the Novi Pazar city assembly in the 2020 local elections and was re-elected when the list won eleven mandates.

Pramenković was given the fourth position on the SPP's list in the 2022 Serbian parliamentary election. The list won three mandates, and she was not re-elected.

=== Leader of the Bosniak National Council ===
Pramenković led the SPP's electoral list for the Bosniak National Council in the 2022 election and was re-elected when the list won twelve seats. The SPP and SDA formed a coalition leadership after the election, and Pramenković was chosen as the council's leader on 26 December 2022. She resigned from the Novi Pazar city assembly on 13 January 2023.
