= Mirsad Hodžić =

Serbian politician (born 1956)

- Мирсад Хоџић

Member of the National Assembly of the Republic of Serbia
- In office 3 August 2020 – 1 August 2022

Personal details
- Born: 1956 (age 69–70)
- Party: Party of Democratic Action of Sandžak

Mirsad Hodžić (Serbian Cyrillic: Мирсад Хоџић; born 24 December 1956) is a Serbian politician from the country's Bosniak community. He served in the Serbian national assembly from 2020 to 2022 as a member of the Party of Democratic Action of Sandžak (SDA).

== Private career ==
Hodžić is from in Sjenica in the Sandžak region of Serbia. He is a textile engineer and has served as director of the Sjenica Institute for Sports and Recreation.

== Politician ==
Hodžić is a longtime SDA activist. In 2002, he led a protest in Sjenica against police chief Milan Nedić, whom he accused of having led an organized terror campaign against Bosniaks in previous years. He called for a multi-ethnic police force in the Sandžak region, noting the low representation of Bosniaks in the existing force.

He appeared in the eighteenth position on the SDA-led List for Sandžak in the 2007 Serbian parliamentary election. The list won two seats in the national assembly, and he was not chosen for a mandate. (From 2000 to 2011, mandates in Serbian parliamentary elections were awarded to sponsoring parties or coalitions rather than individual candidates, and it was common practice for the mandates to be distributed out of numerical order. Hodžić could have been given a seat despite his low position on the list, though ultimately he was not.) He was later given the seventeenth position on the successor Bosniak List for a European Sandžak in the 2008 Serbian parliamentary election and again did not receive a mandate when the list won two seats.

Serbia's electoral system was reformed in 2011, such that all parliamentary mandates were awarded to candidates on successful lists in numerical order.

=== Parliamentarian ===
Hodžić received the second position on the SDA's list in the 2020 Serbian parliamentary election and was elected when the list won three seats. The Serbian Progressive Party (SNS) and its allies won a landslide majority victory, and the SDA was part of a small opposition in the parliament that followed.

During his parliamentary term, Hodžić was a member of the committee on the rights of the child, a deputy member of the spatial planning committee (Note: Formally known as the Committee for Spatial Planning, Transport, Infrastructure, and Telecommunications.) and the committee for human and minority rights and gender equality, and a member of the parliamentary friendship groups with Albania, Algeria, Belgium, Bosnia and Herzegovina, France, Germany, Luxembourg, Montenegro, Norway, Slovenia, Turkey, the United Kingdom, and the United States of America.

In July 2021, he took part in a SDA–Albanian Democratic Alternative delegation that met with Albin Kurti, prime minister of the Republic of Kosovo (which is not recognized by Serbia). During the meeting, the SDA indicated its support for the independence of Kosovo.

He was not a candidate for re-election in 2022.

=== Local politics ===
Hodžić led the SDA's list for the Sjenica municipal assembly in the 2020 Serbian local elections, which were held concurrently with the parliamentary vote. The SDA won a plurality victory with ten out of thirty-nine seats, but the second-place Justice and Reconciliation Party (SPP) ultimately formed a coalition government, and the SDA served in opposition. Hodžić resigned from the local assembly on 11 June 2021.
