= Sabira Hadžiavdić =

Serbian politician (born 1975)

- Сабира Хаџиавдић

Member of the National Assembly of the Republic of Serbia
- In office 23 July 2024 – 23 July 2024

Personal details
- Born: 4 September 1975 (age 51) Prijepolje, SR Serbia, SFR Yugoslavia
- Party: SPP

Sabira Hadžiavdić (Serbian Cyrillic: Сабира Хаџиавдић; born 4 September 1975) is a Serbian politician from the country's Bosniak community. She is a vice-president of the Justice and Reconciliation Party (SPP) and briefly served in Serbia's national assembly in July 2024.

== Early life and career ==
Hadžiavdić was born in Prijepolje, in what was then the Socialist Republic of Serbia in the Socialist Federal Republic of Yugoslavia. She graduated from elementary and high school in the community, majoring in natural science and mathematics. In 2000, she graduated from the University of Montenegro Faculty of Law.

She interned in law from 2001 to 2003 and worked a lawyer at Mem Voćar in Prijepolje from 2005 until 2008, when she founded her own agency for legal and business services. She became acting director of Prijepolje's Center for Social Work in October 2016 and was appointed as director in November 2017. Since 2021, she has worked in Prijepolje's municipal administration.

== Politician ==
=== Bosniak Democratic Union ===
Hadžiavdić joined the Bosniak Democratic Union (BDZ) on its formation in 2010. The BDZ contested the 2012 Serbian parliamentary election at the front of the All Together alliance, and Hadžiavdić received the forty-second position on its electoral list. The list won a single mandate, which went to its lead candidate, BDZ leader Emir Elfić.

Hadžiavdić also received the third position on the BDZ's list for the Prijepolje municipal assembly in the 2012 Serbian local elections, which were held concurrently with the parliamentary vote. She was elected when the list won five mandates.

=== Bosniak Democratic Union of Sandžak ===
The BDZ split into rival factions in 2013, respectively led by Elfić and Chief Mufti Muamer Zukorlić. Hadžiavdić sided with Zukorlić's group, which eventually consolidated itself as the breakaway Bosniak Democratic Union of Sandžak (BDZ Sandžak). The party contested the 2014 Serbian parliamentary election as part of the alliance around the Liberal Democratic Party (LDP), and Hadžiavić appeared in the 102nd position on the alliance's electoral list. Election from this position was not a realistic prospect, and the list did not cross the electoral threshold for assembly representation in any event.

Hadžiavdić appeared in the thirtieth position on a list aligned with the BDZ Sandžak in the 2014 elections for Serbia's Bosniak National Council (BNV). The list won sixteen seats, and she was not elected.

The BDZ Sandžak fielded its own list in the 2016 parliamentary election. Hadžiavdić was given the twelfth position and was not elected when the list won two mandates. She also received the third position on the party's list for the Prijepolje municipal assembly in the concurrent 2016 local elections and was re-elected when the list won five seats. Her second term in this body was brief; she resigned her mandate on 12 October 2016 after being appointed as acting director of the Center for Social Work.

=== Justice and Reconciliation Party ===
The Bosniak Democratic Union of Sandžak restructured itself as the Justice and Reconciliation Party in 2017.

In October 2018, the High Court in Užice ruled that Hadžiavdić's appointment as director of the Center for Social Work had been illegal, as she did not meet the formal qualifications for the position. The verdict was upheld in February 2019 by the Appellate Court in Kragujevac. Despite this, she continued to serve in the role. An attempt by delegates in the municipal assembly to remove her from office in March 2019 was defeated; one member of the municipal council expressed the opinion that the legal decision was non-binding.

Hadžiavdić was given the fifth position on the SPP's electoral list in the 2022 Serbian parliamentary election. The list won three seats, and she was not elected. She became a vice-president of the SPP on 4 May 2023.

She appeared again in the fifth position on the SPP's list in the 2023 parliamentary election and missed direct election when the list won two mandates. She was not a candidate for the SPP in Prijepolje in the concurrent 2023 local elections but instead served as the party's electoral agent.

SPP delegate Rejhan Kurtović resigned from the national assembly on 20 May 2024. As the party's next candidate in sequence on the 2023 electoral list, Hadžiavdić was awarded a replacement mandate on 23 July 2024. Her term in office was extremely brief; she submitted her resignation later the same day.
