= Bosniaks of Serbia and Montenegro =

Bosniaks of Serbia and Montenegro may refer to:

- Bosniaks in Serbia
- Bosniaks of Montenegro
