= Šemsudin Kučević =

Serbian politician (1959–2017)

Šemsudin Kučević (Serbian Cyrillic: Шемсудин Кучевић; 3 November 1959–12 October 2017) was a Serbian Bosniak politician. He was the mayor of Tutin from 1996 to 2008 and again from 2012 until his death, and he also served in the National Assembly of Serbia from 1997 to 2001. Kučević was a member of the Party of Democratic Action of Sandžak (Stranka demokratske akcije Sandžaka, SDA Sandžak).

== Early life and career ==
Kučević was born in Tutin, in the Sandžak region of what was then the People's Republic of Serbia in the Federal People's Republic of Yugoslavia. He stems from the Kuči tribe (hence the surname Kučević). He was raised in the community and later earned a degree from the University of Belgrade Faculty of Political Sciences. He worked in the Tutin municipal administration before entering political life.

== Politician ==
=== During the Milošević Years (1996–2000) ===
Kučević became a leading figure in the SDA Sandžak in the 1990s, when Serbia and the Federal Republic of Yugoslavia were under the authoritarian rule of Slobodan Milošević. In the spring of 1996, while serving as party secretary, Kučević announced that SDA Sandžak leader Sulejman Ugljanin might soon return from exile after a warrant for his arrest was withdrawn. Ugljanin did, in fact, return to Yugoslavian territory later in the year.

The SDA Sandžak contested the 1996 Serbian local elections at the head of the List for Sandžak (Lista za Sandžak) coalition under Ugljanin's leadership. The coalition won a landslide victory in Tutin with eighty per cent of the vote and thirty-two out of thirty-five seats. Kučević was elected to the assembly and was afterward chosen as its president, a position that was at the time equivalent to mayor.

Kučević appeared in the second position on the List for Sandžak electoral list for the Kraljevo division in the 1997 Serbian parliamentary election and was awarded a mandate after the list won two seats. (From 1992 to 2000, Serbia's electoral law stipulated that one-third of parliamentary mandates would be assigned to candidates on successful lists in numerical order, while the remaining two-thirds would be distributed amongst other candidates at the discretion of sponsoring parties or coalitions. Kučević was not automatically elected but was included in his party's delegation all the same.) The List for Sandžak won three seats in total and served in opposition to Serbia's government, which was dominated by Milošević's Socialist Party of Serbia (Socijalistička partija Srbije, SPS).

Kučević called on citizens to boycott the 1998 Serbian foreign mediation in Kosovo referendum, charging that it was both unconstitutional and counterproductive. The following year, he called for an upcoming summit meeting of the Stability Pact for Southeastern Europe to discuss the Sandžak's request for greater autonomy and closer ties to Bosnia and Herzegovina.

In February 2000, the Serbian parliament's administrative committee revoked Kučević's immunity after he was charged in Novi Pazar's municipal court with having organized an eight-member group to travel to Turkey for military training in 1993. Online accounts do not indicate how this matter was resolved, but he was not expelled from parliament. Two months later, Kučević and fellow List for Sandžak deputy Džemail Suljević accused assembly speaker Dragan Tomić of denying them permission to speak in the assembly.

Slobodan Milošević was defeated in the 2000 Yugoslavian presidential election, a watershed moment in Serbian and Yugoslavian politics. The Lišt for Sandžak won another landslide victory in Tutin in the concurrent 2000 Serbian local elections with thirty-four seats out of thirty-seven, and Kučević was afterward appointed for another term as mayor. The SDA Sandžak did not contest the 2000 Serbian parliamentary election, and Kučević's parliamentary term ended when the new assembly convened in January 2001.

=== After the fall of Milošević (2000–17) ===
Kučević was generally supportive of the Democratic Opposition of Serbia (Demokratska opozicija Srbije, DOS) after the fall of Milošević. In February 2001, he was part of a delegation of Sandźak politicians who met with Serbia's new internal affairs minister Dušan Mihajlović to call for greater decentralization in the country. He lamented the slow pace of change under the new administration in October 2001, while still noting that life in the Sandžak had significantly improved during the previous year.

Kučević was also a member of the Bosniak National Council of Sandžak during this period. In August 2003, he took part in a delegation of council members to a meeting with Sulejman Tihić, then the Bosniak representative in the presidency of Bosnia and Herzegovina.

Serbia briefly introduced the direct election of mayors in the 2004 Serbian local elections, and Kučević was easily elected to a third term in Tutin. In 2007, he took part in a mission of Sandžak politicians to Tatarstan in Russia, to establish greater ties between the areas. He blamed Muamer Zukorlić for violent clashes in Tutin the following year and called for the state police to disarm Zukorlić's followers.

The direct election of mayors was abandoned in 2008; since this time, Serbian mayors have been chosen by the elected members of municipal assemblies. Kučević led the SDA Sandžak's list to victory in the 2008 local elections and was confirmed afterward for a fourth term as mayor. Shortly thereafter, he resigned the position to become a deputy director in Serbia's Office for Sustainable Development of Underdeveloped Areas, working under SDA leader Sulejman Ugljanin, who was at the time a minister without portfolio in the Serbian government.

After working in the Serbian government for four years, Kučević again led the SDA to victory in Tutin in the 2012 local elections and was returned afterward to the mayor's office. He again won a majority victory in the 2016 local elections and became mayor for a sixth term.

Serbia's electoral system was reformed at the republic level in 2000, such that the entire country became a single electoral division and all mandates were awarded to candidates on successful lists at the discretion of the sponsoring parties or coalitions, irrespective of numerical order. Kučević appeared on the electoral list of the List for Sandžak in the 2007 parliamentary election and the successor Bosniak List for a European Sandžak list in 2008. Each list won two mandates; Kučević was not included in his party's assembly delegation on either occasion. The electoral system was reformed again in 2011, such that mandates were awarded in numerical order to candidates on successful lists. Kučević appeared on the SDA Sandžak's lists in 2012, 2014, and 2016 parliamentary elections, although he was not elected on any of these occasions.

== Death ==
Kučević died in a car accident on 12 October 2017.

== Electoral record ==
=== Municipal (Tutin) ===
2004 Municipality of Tutin local election: Mayor of Tutin
Candidate	Party	Votes	%
Šemsudin Kučević	List for Sandžak (Affiliation: Party of Democratic Action of Sandžak)	8,588	59.33
Mujo Muković	Sandžak Democratic Party	2,882	19.91
Šerif Hamzagić	G17 Plus	1,226	8.47
Sead Ademović	Strength of Serbia Movement	820	5.66
Mithat Eminović	People's Movement of Sandžak	809	5.59
Osman Bejtović	Citizens' Group	151	1.04
Total		14,476	100.00
