= Morani (Tutin) =

Coordinates: 43°04′59″N 20°21′40″E

- Village (Selo)
- Interactive map of Morani
- Country: Serbia
- District: Raška District
- Municipality: Tutin

Population (2002)
  - Total: 198
- Time zone: UTC+1 (CET)
  - Summer (DST): UTC+2 (CEST)

Morani is a village in the municipality of Tutin, Serbia. According to the 2002 census, the village has a population of 198 people.
