= Selma Kučević =

Serbian politician

Member of the National Assembly of the Republic of Serbia
- In office August 2020 – 6 August 2024

Personal details
- Born: 9 December 1991 (age 34) Tutin, SFR Yugoslavia
- Party: Party of Democratic Action of Sandžak

Selma Kučević (born 9 December 1991 in Tutin) is a Serbian politician. She served in the National Assembly of Serbia from 2020 to 2024. In 2022, she was a member of the Health and Family Committee and Committee on the Rights of the Child in the National Assembly of Serbia.

Kučević was chosen as mayor of Tutin on 1 August 2024 and resigned her seat in the national assembly as she could not hold both offices under a dual mandate.
