= Rasim Ljajić =

Serbian politician (born 1964)

- Расим Љајић
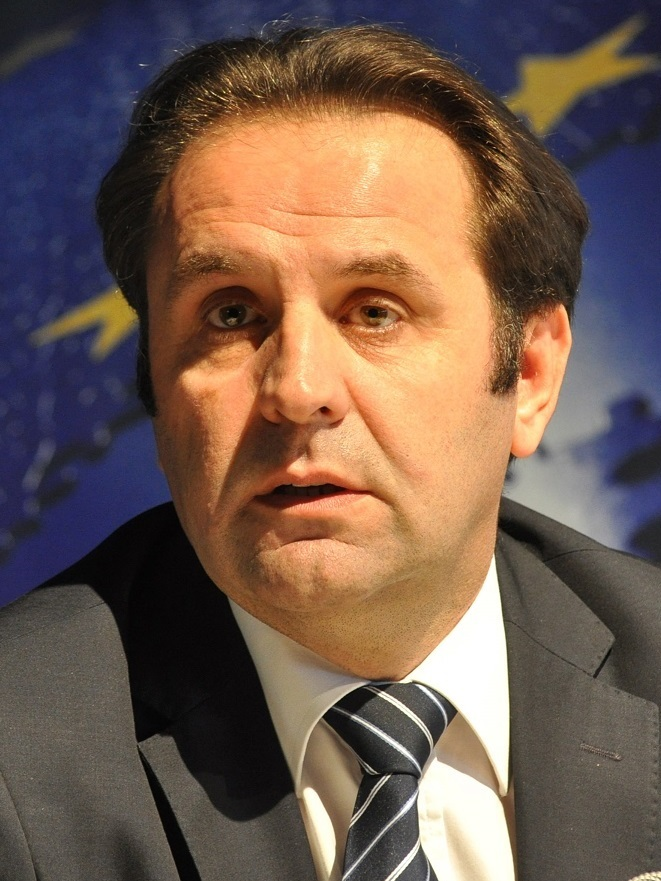
- Ljajić in 2011

President of FK Partizan
- Incumbent
- Assumed office 22 October 2024
- Preceded by: Milorad Vučelić

Deputy Prime Minister of Serbia
- In office 27 July 2012 – 28 October 2020
- Prime Minister: Ivica Dačić; Aleksandar Vučić; Ivica Dačić (Acting); Ana Brnabić
- Preceded by: Verica Kalanović
- Succeeded by: Branko Ružić; Maja Gojković; Branislav Nedimović

Minister of Trade, Tourism and Telecommunications
- In office 27 July 2012 – 28 October 2020
- Prime Minister: Ivica Dačić; Aleksandar Vučić; Ivica Dačić (Acting); Ana Brnabić
- Preceded by: Dušan Petrović (Trade); Milutin Mrkonjić (Telecommunications)
- Succeeded by: Tatjana Matić

Minister of Labour and Social Policy
- In office 15 May 2007 – 27 July 2012
- Prime Minister: Vojislav Koštunica; Mirko Cvetković
- Preceded by: Slobodan Lalović
- Succeeded by: Jovan Krkobabić

Minister of Human and Minority Rights of Serbia and Montenegro
- In office 17 March 2003 – 3 June 2006
- President: Svetozar Marović

Minister of National and Ethnic Communities of FR Yugoslavia
- In office 4 November 2000 – 7 March 2003
- President: Vojislav Koštunica
- Prime Minister: Zoran Žižić; Dragiša Pešić

Personal details
- Born: 28 January 1964 (age 62) Novi Pazar, SR Serbia, SFR Yugoslavia
- Party: Social Democratic Party of Serbia (2008–)
- Other political affiliations: Sandžak Democratic Party (1993–); Party of Democratic Action of Sandžak (1990–1993)
- Education: University of Sarajevo
- Occupation: Politician
- Profession: Physician

Rasim Ljajić (Note: Serbian Cyrillic: Расим Љајић, pronounced [rǎːsim ʎǎːjitɕ]) (born 28 January 1964) is a Serbian politician and sports administrator who currently serves as president of FK Partizan.

A prominent Bosniak politician from Novi Pazar and president of Social Democratic Party of Serbia, he served in multiple ministerial positions of the Government of Serbia from 2000 to 2020. Following the overthrow of Slobodan Milošević, he first served as Minister of Human and Minority Rights of FR Yugoslavia/Serbia and Montenegro from 2000 to 2006. Ljajić was also the president of the National Council for Cooperation with the Hague Tribunal. From 2007 to 2012, he served as Minister of Labour, Employment, Veteran and Social Policy.

From 2012 to 2020, he served as both the Deputy Prime Minister of Serbia and the Minister of Trade, Tourism and Telecommunications.

As of October 2024 he has served as president of FK Partizan.

== Education ==
Ljajić was born in Novi Pazar to a Bosniak Muslim family. After finishing high school, he graduated from the University of Sarajevo School of Medicine.

== Political career ==
In 1990, Ljajić was elected Secretary General of the Party of Democratic Action of Sandžak as one of its founders, a branch of the SDA in the Republic of Bosnia and Herzegovina, aimed at gathering Bosniaks in Serbia. In 1993 he left the party and with dissidents formed the Sandžak Democratic Party, criticizing Sulejman Ugljanin for being an extremist and endorsing separatism from Yugoslavia in an effort to join an enlarged Bosnia dominated by Bosnian Muslims.

One of the Democratic Opposition of Serbia leaders, he became Minister of Human and Minority Rights in 2000 after the fall of Slobodan Milošević, and his mandate as a minister was extended in the rump DS-led 2001 government.

Ljajić is the long-term Head of the Coordination Team with the Hague Tribunal. In the 2003 parliamentary election he unsuccessfully led a "Together for Tolerance" coalition, along with Nenad Čanak of the League of Social Democrats of Vojvodina and Jožef Kasa of the Alliance of Vojvodina Hungarians. The coalition received 4.2% of the vote and did not pass the 5% threshold.

== Sports administration ==
In 2024, Ljajić was elected president of FK Partizan temporary governing body.

Since his appointment he has repeatedly stated that his primary goal at the club is financial stabilization and reducing debt. By August 2026 club's debt was reduced by about 30% which was a major success compared to previous boards. Ljajić restuctured the way club functioned and made good transfer calls, making profit in both seasons in charge. However, Partizan had little success on the pitch and major turmoil beggan to brew between Ljajić and sport director Predrag Mijatović. This led to a highly anticipated club assembly session on 1 June 2026. Both Ljajić and Mijatović were reelected to their positions, but Mijatović decided to resign.

After another unsuccessful European campaign in 2026/27 season the entire board of FK Partizan decided to resign, along with head coach Saša Ilić. However, in their supposed last match at the club, a second leg of the play off for UEFA Conference League against Spanish side Getafe CF, the fans packed the stadium and showed support for both Ilić and Ljajić's board, blaming most of the problems on the actions of Ljajić's predecessors. After the match the board decided to stay until the next session of the club's assembly, scheduled for late September.

== Personal life ==
Ljajić is an ethnic Bosniak. His relative and close friend Dževad Ljajić died in the military helicopter crash in Serbia on the night of 14 March 2015, which also claimed six other lives.

On 10 April 2022, Ljajić was seriously injured in a car accident on the Belgrade-Niš Highway near Ražanj. His associate and former MP Branko Gogić was killed in the accident.

He is a Muslim.

Government offices
Preceded by Slobodan Lalović	Minister of Labour and Social Policy; 2007–2012	Succeeded by Jovan Krkobabić
Preceded by Verica Kalanović	Deputy Prime Minister of Serbia; 2012–2020	Succeeded by Branko Ružić; Maja Gojković; Branislav Nedimović
Preceded by Dušan Petrović (Trade); Milutin Mrkonjić (Telecommunications)	Minister of Trade, Tourism and Telecommunications; 2012–2020	Succeeded by Tatjana Matić
