= Bosniak National Council (Serbia) =

National council of the Bosniak minority in Serbia

Bosniak National Council Bošnjačko nacionalno vijeće Бошњачко национално вијеће
- Coat of arms of the Bosniaks of Serbia

Type
- Type: Unicameral
- Established: 11 May 1991

Leadership
- President: Fuad Baćićanin, SDA Sandžaka since 23 December 2024
- Secretary: Mirza Hajdinović

Structure
- Seats: 35
- Political groups: Majority (22): SDP (12); SDA Sandžaka (10); Opposition (13): SPP (12); BOSS (1)
- Length of term: 4 years

Elections
- Voting system: Party-list proportional representation
- Last election: 13 November 2022
- Next election: 8 November 2026

Meeting place
- Novi Pazar

Website
- bnv.org.rs

The Bosniak National Council (Bosnian: Bošnjačko nacionalno vijeće; Serbian: Бошњачко национално вијеће; abbr. BNV) is the national council of the Bosniak minority in Serbia, responsible for minority self-government in education, culture, the media and the official use of the Bosnian language and script. Based in Novi Pazar, it was founded in 1991 as the Muslim National Council of Sandžak and took its current name in 2003.

The council has 35 members, elected for four-year terms in the elections for the national councils of Serbia's recognised national minorities. In the most recent election, held in 2022, the lists of the Sandžak Democratic Party (SDP) and the Justice and Reconciliation Party (SPP) each won twelve seats, while the list of the Party of Democratic Action of Sandžak (SDA) won ten. Since August 2024, the council has been led by a majority of the SDP and SDA lists, and Fuad Baćićanin has been its president since December 2024. The next election is scheduled for 8 November 2026.

== History ==
=== 1990s ===
It was founded as the Muslim National Council of Sandžak (MNVS) on 11 May 1991. Its founder and first president was Sulejman Ugljanin. Until 2003, the Bosniak National Council was called the Bosniak National Council of Sandžak (BNVS), after which it took its current name.

Throughout the 1990s, it sought autonomy for the Sandžak region and its eventual unification with the Republic of Bosnia and Herzegovina. Following Montenegro's independence in 2006, it remained active only in Serbia.

The Muslim National Council of Sandžak (Bosnian: Muslimansko nacionalno vijeće Sandžaka; Serbian: Муслиманско национално вијеће Санџака; MNVS) was founded in Novi Pazar on 11 May 1991. Sulejman Ugljanin was elected its first president. The MNVS consisted of the Party of Democratic Action of Sandžak (SDAS) and other Bosniak political parties, as well as other associations, the Muslim religious community and non-party individuals. On the same occasion, the MNVS declared that the governments of Serbia and Montenegro were pushing "Greater Serbian ideology" and seeking the "physical extermination" of the Sandžak Muslims so that "the border between Serbs in Serbia and Montenegro could be completely unimpeded". It claimed to be the only legitimate representative of the Sandžak Muslims. The MNVS sought autonomy for the Sandžak should Yugoslavia dissolve and called for Muslims to arm themselves in the case of a civil war. It announced the formation of an assembly, an executive council, public security services and the implementation of the compulsory military service, promising the suspension of every other Yugoslav state body in the case of a dissolution of Yugoslavia or a civil war.

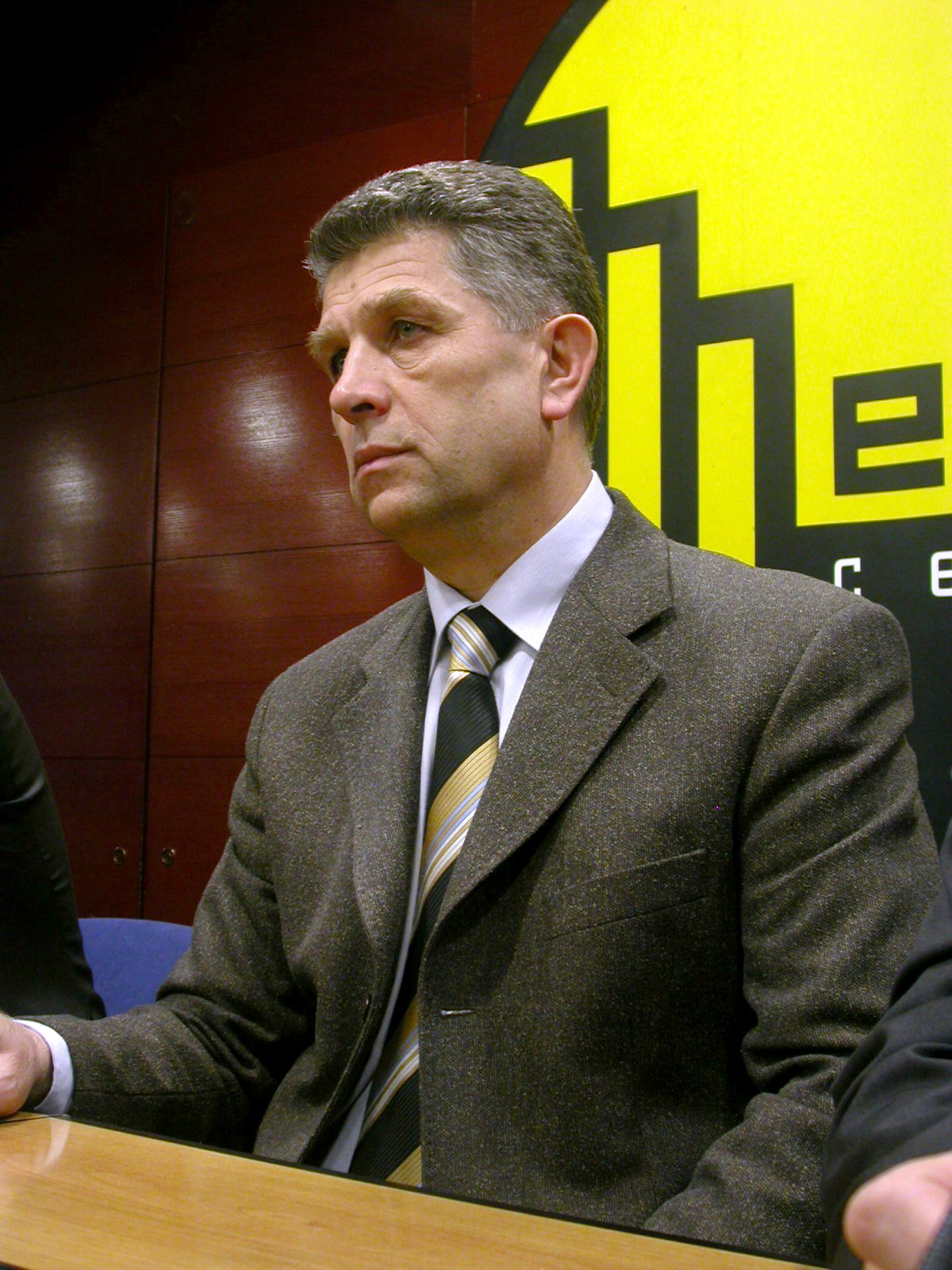
Sulejman Ugljanin, founder and first president of the Muslim National Council of Sandžak

Between 25 and 27 October 1991, the MNVS organised a referendum for the autonomy of Sandžak asking Muslims whether they were in favour of "full political and territorial autonomy" of the region and its "right to join one of the sovereign republics", presumably Bosnia and Herzegovina. Serbian government declared the referendum unconstitutional. The referendum was organised with the support from the Bosnian Party of Democratic Action (SDA), although the MNVS denied this. The MNVS claimed that 264,000 people in Sandžak, the rest of Yugoslavia and abroad asked to be included on the voter list. The turnout was 71 percent, and 98 percent voted in favour of the political and territorial autonomy of the Sandžak with the right of joining another one of Yugoslavia's republics. Ugljanin claimed that 97 percent of Sandžak Muslims and 33 percent of Albanians participated in the referendum, but hardly any Serbs. He also said that the MNVS would decide on which Yugoslav republic Sandžak would join, depending on further developments.

In November 1991, the MNVS selected a new administration for the region which acted as a shadow government. The secretary of the Party of Democratic Action of Sandžak, Rasim Ljajić, was named the prime minister, while Ugljanin remained the president of the MNVS. The SDAS maintained a majority of seats in the new government, which also included the Liberal Bosniak Organisation and the Party of National Equity. In January 1992, the MNVS adopted a resolution calling the Sandžak Muslims to oppose the recruitment for the Yugoslav People's Army (JNA).

After the European Community recognized the secession of several former Yugoslav republics in December 1991, Ugljanin sent the results of the referendum to Dutch Foreign Minister Hans van den Broek asking for "the recognition and full international and legal subjectivity of Sandžak". In January 1992, the MNVS declared the creation of a "special status" for the Sandžak that would grant the region a far-reaching autonomy. The initiative was not recognised by the Serbian governments. In a follow-up letter to the European Ministerial Council of 5 April 1992, Ugljanin, under the impact of the imminent establishment of the Federal Republic of Yugoslavia (founded after Slovenia, Croatia, Bosnia and Herzegovina, and Macedonia seceded from the country's previous incarnation), and referring to the Bosnian War, asked again for the recognition of Sandžak, as well as the deployment of UN troops and the establishment of an international presence in the region.

On 18 April 1992, a Conference of Muslim Intellectuals of Sandžak, Montenegro, and Serbia protested against the establishment of the Federal Republic of Yugoslavia, saying it occurred against the will of the country's Muslim and calling for its non-recognition. The MNVS adopted a resolution on 28 April 1992 non-recognizing the existence of FR Yugoslavia and insisting that the Muslims of Sandžak be allowed to join the republic of their choice, which in this case was the Muslim-dominated Republic of Bosnia and Herzegovina. On 16 August 1992, the MNVS went a step further. Referring to their imminent participation in the 1992 London Peace Conference, the MNVS announced a total boycott of Serbia and Montenegro, including their parliaments, until the Sandžak was granted official status and "state terrorism" ended. The MNVS called for a boycott of the early parliamentary elections of May 1992, December 1992 and December 1993. Most Muslims did not participate in the elections, nor did the Albanians in Kosovo.

On 6 June 1993, the MNVS adopted the Memorandum on the Establishment of Special Status for Sandžak inside the FR Yugoslavia (Serbia and Montenegro), which sought far-reaching autonomy. The Memorandum, which was envisaged as being signed by Yugoslavia, the MNVS, the Republic of Bosnia and Herzegovina and the International Conference on the Former Yugoslavia (ICFY), remained a dead letter.

In 1996, Sandžak Muslim parties and associations adopted the name "Bosniaks" instead of "Muslims" after the same decision of the Congress of Bosniak Intellectuals held in Sarajevo in 1993. Therefore, the name of the MNVS was changed to the Bosniak National Council of Sandžak (Serbo-Croatian: Bošnjačko nacionalno vijeće Sandžaka; Serbian: Бошњачко национално вијеће Санџака; BNVS). After end of the Bosnian War, the Bosniak National Council of Sandžak adopted on 19 July 1999 the Memorandum on Autonomy of Sandžak and Special Relations with Bosnia and Herzegovina. During the 2000 presidential election, the BNVS supported the Democratic Opposition of Serbia, calling Bosniaks to vote for a joint candidate of the opposition. The election culminated in the overthrow of Slobodan Milošević.

=== 2000s ===
Ethnic flag of Bosniaks in Serbia, adopted by the Bosniak National Council

In these new circumstances, the status of ethnic minorities in Serbia and Montenegro was legally regulated. On 6 September 2003, the BNVS held an electoral assembly in Novi Pazar; Sulejman Ugljanin was re-elected president. During the Assembly, the Bosniak National Council of Sandžak was suspended, and, under the new law, the Bosniak National Council (Serbo-Croatian: Bošnjačko nacionalno vijeće; Serbian: Бошњачко национално вијеће; BNV) started functioning. The Statute of the Bosniak National Council, adopted on 13 September 2003, described the Bosniak National Council as the highest representative body of the Bosniak ethnic minority in Serbia. It had jurisdiction in the use of language and script, education, culture, and media on Bosnian language. Among the most important decisions of the Bosniak National Council were those determining the flag and the coat of arms of the Bosniak ethnic minority, its holidays, awards and acknowledgments and ethnic manifestations. Following Montenegro's independence in 2006, the Bosniak National Council remained active only in Serbia.

In 2009, the Bosniak National Council participated in the creation of the draft of the Law on National Councils of Ethnic Minorities, which improved the protection mechanism of the ethnic minorities in Serbia. The Bosniak National Council issued the Declaration on Status of the Bosniaks of Sandžak in the Republic of Serbia on 27 June 2009. In the Declaration, the Bosniak National Council warned the Serbian state authorities about alleged halt in the process of the consummation of collective rights of the Bosniak ethnic minority. Later, the Bosniak National Council adopted the Decision on Determining Traditional Names of the Units of the Local Self-Administration, Populated Places, and Other Geographical Names in the Bosnian Language on the territory of Novi Pazar, Tutin, Sjenica, and Prijepolje. The Bosniak National Council created the Model for Education of the Bosniaks of Sandžak, the Strategy of Informing on Bosnian Language, and founded the Institute for Culture.

=== 2010s ===
An unsuccessful election for the new composition of the Bosniak National Council was held on 6 June 2010, after which the old leadership continued to lead the Council. This led to the new halt in the relations between the Council and Serbian government, after which the Council adopted the Resolution on Status and Consummation of Rights of the Bosniak people in Serbia on 1 March 2012, and later the Declaration to the Bosniak People and Citizens of Sandžak as an instruction to the Bosniak political parties and associations to carry out a pressure on the Serbian government. On 6 April 2012, the Bosniak National Council adopted the anthem of the Bosniak ethnic minority called "Ja sin sam tvoj" (I'm your son).

New elections for the national councils of Serbia's national minorities were held in October 2014. The turnout for the Bosniak National Council was 35.7 percent. Most of the seats were won by the coalition led by the Party of Democratic Action of Sandžak, which gained 19 representatives, while the opposing coalition under Mufti Muamer Zukorlić won 16 seats.

After the 2018 election, the lists "Self-Determination" (Samoopredeljenje), led by Ugljanin, and "It's Time" (Vakat je) formed a majority. In June 2019, after president Esad Džudžo resigned as a councillor, the council elected Jasmina Curić of the "Self-Determination" list as its president with eighteen votes.

=== 2020s ===
In the election held on 13 November 2022, the SDP list led by Husein Memić won 15,930 votes and twelve seats; the SPP-backed "Unity for a Free Council" list led by Misala Pramenković won 15,276 votes and twelve seats; the SDA list "Bosniak Unity – Dr Sulejman Ugljanin" won 12,988 votes and ten seats; and the "Alliance for Sandžak and Good Bosniaks" list of Admir Muratović won one seat. On 26 December 2022, Pramenković was elected president with the votes of the SPP and SDA lists.

In August 2024, the SDP announced that it would take part in running the council in coalition with the SDA list, whose councillors had called for Pramenković's dismissal; Pramenković accused the SDA of breaching its strategic partnership with the SPP and the SDP of seeking to take control of the council. On 9 August 2024, the council dismissed Pramenković with the votes of 20 of the 28 councillors present and elected Adel Slatina of the SDP as president; Sead Šemsović, Sanela Međedović, Jasmina Curić and Samira Ćosović were elected vice-presidents, and Fuad Baćićanin president of the Executive Board. Under a rotation agreement, Slatina resigned in December 2024, and on 23 December the council elected Baćićanin as president. Pramenković and councillor Edin Numanović objected that the procedure was rushed and irregular, as Baćićanin would remain at the head of the Executive Board.

The next election was called for 8 November 2026, with 114,080 voters on the special Bosniak voter register. Four lists were proclaimed: "Sandžak Democratic Party – Elmir Habibović", "Guardians of Sandžak" (Čuvari Sandžaka), "Usame Zukorlić – Movement for the Unification of Bosniaks" and "United Bosniaks – Samir Tandir". The "Guardians of Sandžak" list, led by Baćićanin, was submitted as a citizens' group, but includes officials and prominent members of the SDA.

== Organisation ==
The council elects a president and vice-presidents from among its members, as well as an Executive Board, and appoints a secretary.

Officers of the Bosniak National Council
Position	Name	List
President	Fuad Baćićanin	Bosniak Unity (SDA)
Vice-presidents	Sead Šemsović; Sanela Međedović; Jasmina Curić; Samira Ćosović	—N/a
Secretary	Mirza Hajdinović	Not a councillor

== Latest election results ==
List	Votes	%	Seats
Sandžak Democratic Party – Husein Memić	15,930	34.48	12
Unity for a Free Council (SPP)	15,276	33.07	12
Bosniak Unity (SDA)	12,988	28.11	10
Alliance for Sandžak and Good Bosniaks	1,791	3.88	1
Bosniak List – Esad Džudžo	213	0.46	0
Total	46,198	100.00	35
Source: Danas

== See also ==
- Bosniaks in Serbia
- Sandžak Democratic Party
- Party of Democratic Action of Sandžak
- Justice and Reconciliation Party
