= Justice and Reconciliation Party =

Political party in Serbia

Justice and Reconciliation Party: Stranka pravde i pomirenja; Странка правде и помирења
- Abbreviation: SPP
- President: Usame Zukorlić
- Vice-Presidents: Edin Đerlek; Edin Numanović; Sabira Hadžiavdić; Rejhan Kurtović
- Founder: Muamer Zukorlić
- Founded: 14 August 2013
- Split from: Bosniak Democratic Union
- Headquarters: Rifata Burdževića 1, Novi Pazar
- Ideology: Bosniak minority interests; Conservatism
- Political position: Centre-right to right-wing
- Colours: Dark green
- National Assembly: 1 / 250
- Bosniak National Council: 12 / 35

Website
- spp.rs

The Justice and Reconciliation Party (Bosnian: Stranka pravde i pomirenja; Serbian: Странка правде и помирења; abbr. SPP) is a regionalist political party in Serbia, representing the Bosniak minority. Founded in 2013 as the Bosniak Democratic Union of Sandžak, it took its current name in 2017, when Muamer Zukorlić became its leader; after his death in 2021, it has been led by his son, Usame Zukorlić. In the 2026 parliamentary election, its list won one seat in the National Assembly.

== History ==
It contested the 2014 parliamentary elections as part of a joint list with the centrist Liberal Democratic Party (LDP) and centre-left Social Democratic Union (SDU), but the alliance received only 3.4% of the vote, failing to win a seat.

In the 2016 parliamentary elections it ran alone, winning two seats. The party officially changed its name from the Bosniak Democratic Union of Sandžak to the Justice and Reconciliation Party on 23 December 2017. Jahja Fehratović had led the party from its formation until this time; following the name change, Muamer Zukorlić was recognised as its leader.

Muamer Zukorlić died suddenly in Novi Pazar on 6 November 2021, while serving as an MP and deputy speaker of the National Assembly. On 14 November, the party unanimously named his son, Usame Zukorlić, as its acting president. In May 2022, Samir Tandir, who had served as an MP from 2020 to 2022, left the party, accusing it of carrying out "North Korea-style purges" of dissenters, and went on to found the Bosniak-Serb Alliance.

In the 2022 election for the Bosniak National Council, the SPP-backed list "Unity for a Free Council" won twelve of the 35 seats, and its leader, Misala Pramenković, was elected president of the council in December 2022 with the support of the SDA Sandžaka list. In August 2024, after the SDA list joined the Sandžak Democratic Party in a new majority, Pramenković was dismissed; she accused the SDA of breaching its strategic partnership with the SPP.

In the 2026 parliamentary election, SPP ran on the list "Usame Zukorlić – Movement for Unification", which won 12,440 votes (0.28%). As a national minority list, it is exempt from the electoral threshold, and it won one seat after voting was repeated at 53 polling stations on 1 November; CRTA reported irregularities at the repeat vote, including vote-buying in favour of the list. The final results were announced by RIK on 5 November. For the 2026 Bosniak National Council election, the party ran the list "Usame Zukorlić – Movement for the Unification of Bosniaks".

== Political positions ==
SPP is Bosniak nationalist and advocates for minority rights for Bosniaks. Additionally, it promotes conservatism. SPP has defined itself as a "multi-ethnic, multi-confessional, liberal-conservative, and pro-European party of the centre-right".

== Electoral performance ==
=== Parliamentary elections ===
National Assembly
Year	Leader	Popular vote	% of popular vote	#	# of seats	Seat change	Coalition	Status
2014	Jahja Fehratović	120,879	3.48%	▲7th	0 / 250	0	BDZS–LDP–SDU	Extra-parliamentary
2016	Jahja Fehratović	32,526	0.89%	▼10th	2 / 250	▲2	–	Support
2020	Muamer Zukorlić	32,170	1.04%	▼12th	4 / 250	▲2	SPP–DPM	Support
2022	Usame Zukorlić	35,850	0.97%	12th	3 / 250	▼1	–	Government
2023	Usame Zukorlić	29,066	0.78%	▲11th	2 / 250	▼1	SPP–DSHV	Government
2026	Usame Zukorlić	12,440	0.28%	11th	1 / 250	▼1	–	TBA

=== Presidential elections ===
President of the Republic
Year	Candidate	1st round popular vote		% of popular vote	2nd round popular vote		% of popular vote	Notes
2017	Aleksandar Vučić	1st	2,012,788	56.01%	—N/a	—	—	Supported Vučić
2022	Aleksandar Vučić	1st	2,224,914	60.01%	—N/a	—	—	Supported Vučić

== See also ==
- Bosniaks in Serbia
- Bosniak National Council (Serbia)
