= Sulejman Ugljanin =

Serbian politician

- Сулејман Угљанин
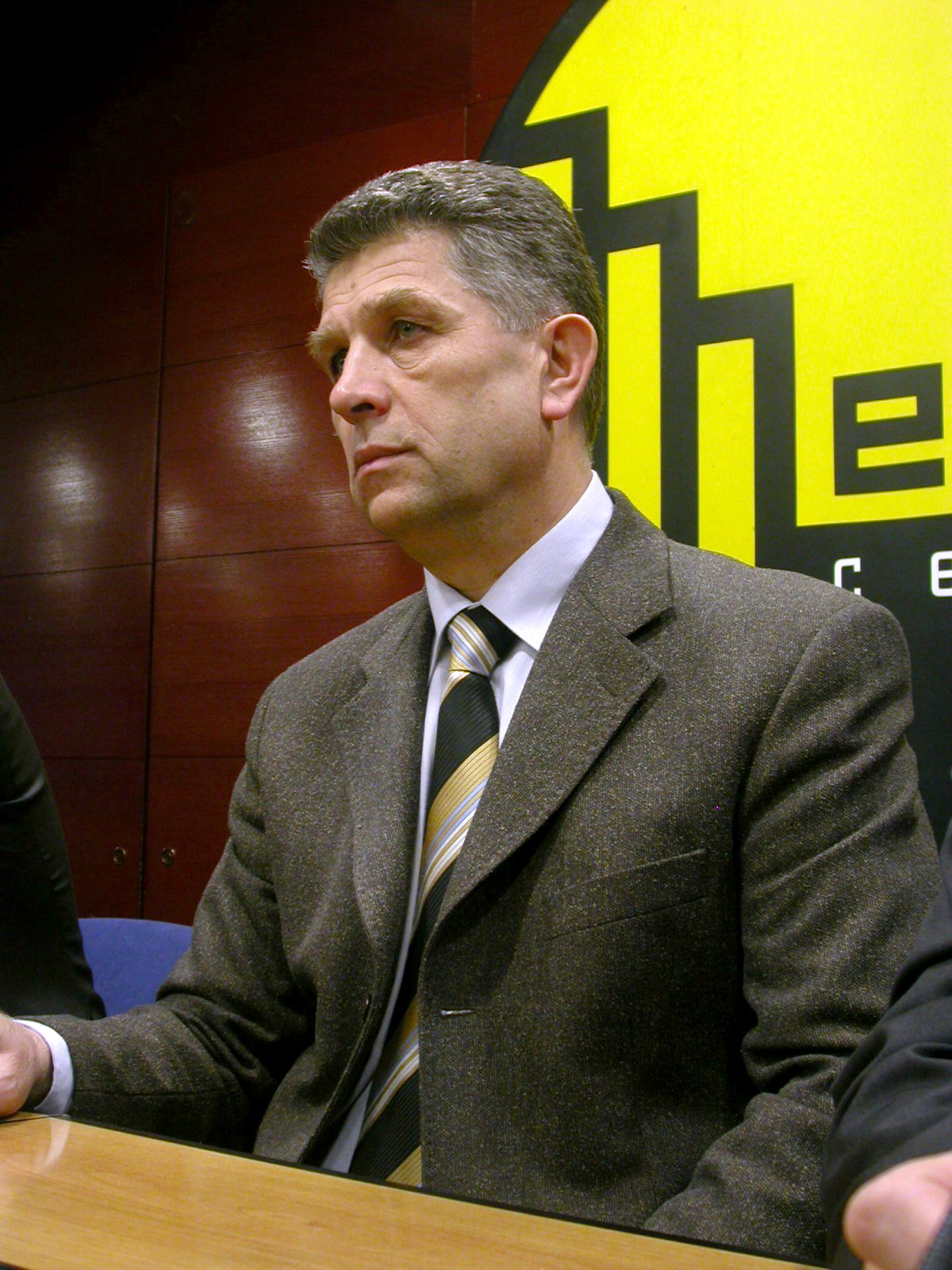

President of the Bosniak National Council
- In office 11 May 1991 – 21 October 2018
- Vice President: Muhedin Fijuljanin Esad Džudžo Redžep Škrijelj Vasvija Gusinac
- Preceded by: Office established
- Succeeded by: Esad Džudžo

Member of the National Assembly
- In office 16 April 2014 – 28 June 2016

Minister without portfolio
- In office 7 July 2008 – 27 April 2014
- Prime Minister: Mirko Cvetković (2008–12) Ivica Dačić (2012–14)

Mayor of Novi Pazar
- In office 9 October 2004 – 8 July 2008
- Preceded by: Vasvija Gusinac
- Succeeded by: Mirsad Đerlek

Member of the Federal Assembly of the FR Yugoslavia
- In office 20 March 1997 – 7 October 2000

President of the Party of Democratic Action of Sandžak
- Incumbent
- Assumed office 29 July 1990
- Vice President: Enis Imamović
- Deputy: Šemsudin Kučević
- Preceded by: Office established

Personal details
- Born: 20 November 1953 (age 72) Mitrovica, AR Kosovo and Metohija, PR Serbia, FPR Yugoslavia
- Citizenship: Serbian
- Party: Party of Democratic Action of Sandžak
- Spouse: Mersija Ugljanin
- Children: 4 (1 son and 3 daughters)
- Education: University of Sarajevo
- Occupation: Politician
- Profession: Dentist

Sulejman Ugljanin (pronounced [sulějman ǔɡʎanin]; Serbian Cyrillic: Сулејман Угљанин; born 20 November 1953) is a Serbian politician. An ethnic Bosniak, he has led the Party of Democratic Action of Sandžak since its establishment in 1990.

Ugljanin was previously the president of the Bosniak National Council and a deputy in the National Assembly. He was the Mayor of Novi Pazar, and the former Minister without portfolio in the Government of Serbia between 2008 and 2014. Ugljanin holds a doctoral degree in stomatology from the University of Sarajevo. He is married and has four children.

== Early life ==
Sulejman Ugljanin was born in Mitrovica in the Autonomous Region of Kosovo and Metohija, which was part of the People's Republic of Serbia in the FPR Yugoslavia. His parents were from Novi Pazar, but moved to Mitrovica after his grandfather bought a house there. He had three sisters and three brothers. His father worked as a carpenter, and mother as a tailor.

He started going to school at an early age of six, assuring his parents and school principal that his sisters and brothers taught him how to read and write. He grew up in somewhat conservative surrounding, as his cousins objected to his father for letting his oldest daughter to attend a high school. Ugljanin's oldest sister later became a chemical engineer and first highly educated family member. Although religion was discouraged in the communist Yugoslavia, his family maintained a religious life. Ugljanin recalled that he fasted since his early childhood for every Ramadan.

His parents sent him to a dental high school in Priština. Ugljanin soon started to train boxing for the Radnički boxing club. After the high school, he joined the University of Sarajevo, where he studied dentistry. He continued to box in Sarajevo as well. He quit boxing after a match in Bijeljina in 1979. In Sarajevo he also started biking with his colleagues. Later, he specialised prosthetics in Sarajevo.

After finishing his studies, Ugljanin started working as a children dentist in Novi Pazar. There he taught first aid and civil protection. During one of his courses he met his wife Mersija, at the time a clerk for the municipal government in Novi Pazar. They got married in 1985. He has three daughters and one son with her.

== Political career ==
Ugljanin started his political career in 1990. He was elected to the Executive Council of the Party of Democratic Action in May 1990, and in the same year he became the president of the Party of Democratic Action of Sandžak. A year later he was elected the president of the Muslim National Council of Sandžak.

In 1993, when the authorities started arresting those responsible for "endangering territorial integrity of the FR Yugoslavia and unallowed carrying of arms", Ugljanin escaped to Turkey, where he spent three years. This was a turning point in his political career, as many of his associates started leaving him, and creating their own political parties. He accused them of betrayal of the Sandžak Muslims' interests.

However, after he returned from Turkey, he was elected as a representative in the Federal Parliament of Yugoslavia. As of the 2000 election, when Slobodan Milošević was overthrown, Ugljanin created a successful cooperation with Vojislav Koštunica and Velimir Ilić, siding in a coalition with them. Between 2004 and 2008 he was a mayor of Novi Pazar. During this period, his influence amongst Bosniaks in the Sandžak region became very strong with the approval from the central government in Belgrade, led by Koštunica at the time.

== Controversies ==
Ugljanin has been described as a supporter and promoter of Greater Albania ideology and an extremist by Serbian government officials. He was labelled a promoter of fascism because of his involvement in placement of a plaque dedicated to Axis collaborator Aćif Hadžiahmetović accused of massive war crimes against Serbs.

In 2018 Ugljanin went on and controversially stated that he plans to "...defeat this monster, this fascist creation, the Serb state of Serbia". In 2022, Ugljanin compared the LGBT community to "cattle".

== Notes and references ==
Notes

News reports

- Isailović, Danijela (17 January 2011). "Bokser koji voli ruže" (in Serbian). Press.
- Novosel, Slađana (21 January 2009). "Ličnost Danas: Sulejman Ugljanin" (in Serbian). Danas. Archived from the original on 22 January 2020.

Government offices
Preceded by Dragan Đilas	Minister without portfolio 2008–2014	Succeeded by Velimir Ilić
