= Sandžak Democratic Party =

Political party in Serbia

Sandžak Democratic Party: Sandžačka demokratska partija; Санџачка демократска партија
- Abbreviation: SDP
- President: Samir Lekić
- Vice-presidents: Husein Memić; Fahrudin Đekić; Fazila Ferizović-Berović; Erkan Hodžić; Jasmin Hodžić; Armin Mujezinović
- Founder: Rasim Ljajić
- Founded: 1994 (as Coalition for Sandžak); 2000 (as SDP)
- Split from: Party of Democratic Action of Sandžak
- Headquarters: Novi Pazar
- Ideology: Bosniak minority interests
- Political position: Centre-left
- National affiliation: Rasim Ljajić – Ljudski (2026)
- National Assembly: 1 / 250
- Bosniak National Council: 12 / 35

Website
- sdp.org.rs

The Sandžak Democratic Party (SDP; Bosnian: Sandžačka demokratska partija; Serbian: Санџачка демократска партија) is a regionalist political party in Serbia representing the Bosniak minority. Based in Novi Pazar, it was founded in 1994 as the Coalition for Sandžak by Rasim Ljajić, who led it until 2009. It has governed Novi Pazar since 2008, and has been led by Samir Lekić since 2024.

For most of the period after 2012, SDP was a partner of the Serbian Progressive Party (SNS), running on its lists alongside Ljajić's other party, the Social Democratic Party of Serbia (SDPS). In the 2026 Serbian parliamentary election, it ran on its own national minority list, "Rasim Ljajić – Ljudski", formed with the Montenegrin Democratic Party, and won one seat.

== History ==
=== Formation and early years ===
The party was founded in 1994 by Rasim Ljajić as the Coalition for Sandžak, when Ljajić and a group of members broke away from the Party of Democratic Action of Sandžak (SDA). It was renamed the Sandžak Democratic Party in 2000. Ljajić led the party until 2009, when he founded the Social Democratic Party of Serbia (SDPS); he was succeeded by Rešad Hodžić, who was followed by Nihad Hasanović in 2013. SDP has governed Novi Pazar since 2008.

The party boycotted the 1997 parliamentary election and took part in the 2000 election as a member of the Democratic Opposition of Serbia (DOS). In 2003, it ran on the "Together for Tolerance" list with Nenad Čanak and József Kasza, which won 161,765 votes but no seats. It then ran with the Democratic Party, winning three seats in 2007 and four on the "For a European Serbia" list in 2008.

=== Partnership with SNS ===
Ljajić, who held various ministerial posts after the overthrow of Slobodan Milošević, led SDPS from its foundation in December 2009 until 2026. He nevertheless remained the main political figure of SDP, describing the relationship between the two parties as a partnership similar to the German CDU/CSU, and often led their joint lists in elections. SDP was a coalition partner of SNS at both the local and national level from 2012, and ran on the SNS-led list in the 2020 parliamentary election; its members of the National Assembly sat in the SDPS parliamentary group. Ljajić announced that SDP would again run with SNS in the 2022 elections, while calling for better cooperation with the other Bosniak parties, the Party of Democratic Action of Sandžak and the Justice and Reconciliation Party.

=== Leadership change and 2026 election ===
On 13 April 2024, the delegates of the party's seventh congress in Novi Pazar unanimously elected Samir Lekić, the president of the City Assembly of Novi Pazar, as president of SDP, succeeding Nihad Hasanović, who had led the party since 2013; Husein Memić, the minister of tourism and youth, was elected one of its vice-presidents. In August 2025, the party set up an election staff headed by Lekić, and said that if it were not in government it would continue to support parliamentary majorities at all levels.

In mid-2026, Ljajić stepped down as president of SDPS, citing his duties as vice-president of the Partizan sports society and the need for a leader fully focused on the election campaign. He was succeeded by Jug Radivojević. SDPS then joined the SPS-led coalition, while Ljajić was expected to run "in two formats": through SDPS on the SPS list, and through SDP on a separate minority list.

On 14 September 2026, SDP and the Montenegrin Democratic Party (CDP) submitted a joint list for the snap parliamentary election, "Rasim Ljajić – Ljudski", with Ljajić as its ballot carrier. The list had 250 candidates, more than half of them women, and campaigned under the slogan "It's time for normality" (Vreme je za normalnost). The Republic Electoral Commission unanimously proclaimed it a national minority list on 15 September, after confirming 7,675 valid signatures. In the election, the list won 20,638 votes (0.47%) and one seat, according to the final results announced on 5 November. Ljajić himself was not a candidate; the seat went to the first candidate on the list, Dženan Palamar from Novi Pazar.

On 2 November 2026, the Agency for the Prevention of Corruption ruled that SDP had breached the Law on Financing Political Activities by misusing public resources during the campaign in Prijepolje. The ruling, which followed a complaint filed on 16 October, concerned two sets of posts by the party's local branch on social media: a video of 15 October in which two of the list's candidates, Muamer Bačevac, a member of the National Assembly who was second on the list, and Elvin Banjica, the deputy mayor of Prijepolje, toured publicly funded projects in the town, and posts of 22 October showing a dental surgery of the Prijepolje Health Centre and a youth club in Brodarevo supported by the Ministry of Tourism and Youth. The Agency found that the party had used public premises and equipment for its promotion and had presented publicly funded works as if it had financed them. SDP was notified of the proceedings on 20 October but did not respond before the ruling was issued.

== Ideology ==
SDP represents the interests of the Bosniak minority in Serbia and has been described as a centre-left party.

== Organisation ==
SDP is headquartered in Novi Pazar. It is led by its president, Samir Lekić, who was elected in April 2024. Its six vice-presidents are Husein Memić, Fahrudin Đekić, Fazila Ferizović-Berović, Erkan Hodžić, Jasmin Hodžić and Armin Mujezinović, and its general secretary is Salbin Karišik.

=== List of presidents ===
President	Term start	Term end
Rasim Ljajić	1994	2009
Rešad Hodžić	2009	2013
Nihad Hasanović	2013	13 April 2024
Samir Lekić	13 April 2024	Incumbent

== Electoral performance ==
=== Parliamentary elections ===
National Assembly
Year	Leader	Popular vote	% of popular vote	#	# of seats	Seat change	Coalition	Status	Ref.
1997	Rasim Ljajić	Election boycott			0 / 250	0	–	Extra-parliamentary	
2000	Rasim Ljajić	2,404,758	65.69%	▲1st	— (Note: Sources do not give the number of seats won by the party's candidates.)	—N/a	DOS	Government	
2003	Rasim Ljajić	161,765	4.29%	▼7th	0 / 250	—N/a	ZZT	Extra-parliamentary	
2007	Rasim Ljajić	915,014	23.09%	▲2nd	3 / 250	▲3	DS	Government	
2008	Rasim Ljajić	1,590,200	39.25%	▲1st	4 / 250	▲1	ZES	Government	
2012	Rešad Hodžić	863,294	23.09%	▼2nd	— (Note: From 2012, the party's candidates ran within the share of the Social Democratic Party of Serbia (SDPS) on coalition lists, and sources report only the SDPS total: nine seats in 2012, ten in 2014 and 2016, eight in 2020 and 2022, and seven in 2023.)		IZBŽ	Government	
2014	Nihad Hasanović	1,736,920	49.96%	▲1st	—		AV–BKV	Government	
2016	Nihad Hasanović	1,823,147	49.71%	1st	—		AV–SP	Government	
2020	Nihad Hasanović	1,953,998	63.02%	1st	—		AV–ZND	Government	
2022	Nihad Hasanović	1,635,101	44.27%	1st	—		AV–ZMS	Government	
2023	Nihad Hasanović	1,783,701	48.07%	1st	—		AV–SNSDS	Government	
2026	Samir Lekić	20,638	0.47%	▼7th	1 / 250	—N/a	Ljudski	TBA	

== See also ==
- Bosniaks in Serbia
- Social Democratic Party of Serbia
