= Party of Democratic Action of Sandžak =

Political party in Serbia

Party of Democratic Action of Sandžak: Stranka demokratske akcije Sandžaka; Странка демократске акције Санџака
- Abbreviation: SDA Sandžaka
- President: Sulejman Ugljanin
- Secretary-General: Ahmedin Škrijelj
- Deputy President: Šemsudin Kučević
- Founder: Sulejman Ugljanin
- Founded: 29 July 1990
- Headquarters: 28. novembra 94, Novi Pazar
- Ideology: Bosniak minority interests; Bosniak nationalism; Autonomism
- Political position: Centre-right to right-wing
- Colours: Green
- National Assembly: 1 / 250
- Bosniak National Council: 10 / 35

Party flag

Website
- sda.rs

The Party of Democratic Action of Sandžak (Bosnian: Stranka demokratske akcije Sandžaka, Serbian: Странка демократске акције Санџака, SDA Sandžaka or SDAS) is a regionalist political party in Serbia, representing the Bosniak minority. Founded in 1990 as the Sandžak branch of the Party of Democratic Action, it has been led by Sulejman Ugljanin since its foundation. In the 1990s, it founded the Muslim National Council of Sandžak, the predecessor of the Bosniak National Council, and campaigned for the autonomy of Sandžak. In the 2026 parliamentary election, its list won one seat.

== History ==
=== 1990–1992 ===
The Party of Democratic Action of Sandžak (SDA) was founded on 29 July 1990 in Novi Pazar, as a branch of the Party of Democratic Action based in Sarajevo, which was then a pan-Yugoslav political party. The branch was founded in order to protect the interests of ethnic Muslims of Serbia, Montenegro and Kosovo. The leadership of the SDA included Sulejman Ugljanin, president of the SDA, Harun Hadžić, president of the SDA of Montenegro, Numan Balić, president of the SDA of Kosovo and Riza Halili, president of the SDA of Preševo.

The SDA founded the Muslim National Council of Sandžak (MNVS) on 11 May 1991. The MNVS acted as a quasi-governmental body of the Sandžak Muslims. It organised a referendum between 25 and 27 October 1991, asking the Sandžak Muslims whether they were in favour of "full political and territorial autonomy" of Sandžak and its "right to join one of the sovereign republics", presumably the SR Bosnia and Herzegovina. The Serbian authorities declared the referendum unconstitutional. The referendum was organised with the support from the Bosnian SDA, although this was denied by the MNVS. The MNVS claimed that 264,000 people in Sandžak, the rest of the SFR Yugoslavia and abroad asked to be included on the voter list. The turnout was 71%, while 98% voted in favour of the political and territorial autonomy of Sandžak with right of joining to other republics of the SFR Yugoslavia. President of the SDA said that the MNVS will decide which republic will Sandžak join, depending on further developments. It historically advocated radical Bosniak nationalist and Islamist ideology.

In late November the MNVS selected a new government. The secretary of the SDA, Rasim Ljajić was named the prime minister, while Ugljanin remained the president of the MNVS. The SDA maintained majority in the government, with the Liberal Bosniak Organisation and the Party of National Equity also being represented.

After the European Community declared the recognition of former Yugoslav republics in December 1991, Ugljanin sent the results of referendum to the Dutch Foreign Minister Hans van den Broek asking for "the recognition and full international and legal subjectivity of Sandžak". In January 1992, the MNVS declared the creation of a "special status" for Sandžak that would give to the region a far-reaching autonomy. The initiative was not recognised by the Yugoslav or Serbian government.

In a follow-up letter to the European Ministerial Council of 5 April 1992, Ugljanin, under the impact of the imminent foundation of the Federal Republic of Yugoslavia (founded after other republics left the SFR Yugoslavia, except Serbia and Montenegro), and referring to the Bosnian War of Independence, asked again for the recognition of Sandžak, as well as deployment of UN troops and other international presence.

On 18 April, a Conference of Muslim Intellectuals of Sandžak, Montenegro and Serbia protested, in strong terms, against the foundation of the FR Yugoslavia against their will, calling for its nonrecognition. The MNVS adopted a resolution on 28 April that denied existence of the FR Yugoslavia, and insisted that the Sandžak Muslims should join the republic of their choice, which, in this case, was the Bosnian Muslim dominated Republic of Bosnia and Herzegovina. In the resolution, it was bluntly said that "Muslims of Sandžak do not recognise newly created Yugoslavia".

=== 2022–present ===
In the 2022 election for the Bosniak National Council, the SDA list "Bosniak Unity – Dr Sulejman Ugljanin" won ten of the 35 seats. Its councillors supported the election of Misala Pramenković of the Justice and Reconciliation Party (SPP) as president of the council in December 2022. In August 2024, the SDA list formed a new majority with the Sandžak Democratic Party (SDP) and Pramenković was dismissed, with Adel Slatina of the SDP elected president; under a rotation agreement, Fuad Baćićanin of the SDA list succeeded Slatina in December 2024. For the 2026 council election, Baćićanin led the list "Guardians of Sandžak", which was submitted as a citizens' group but included officials and prominent members of the SDA.

In the 2026 parliamentary election, the party's list, "SDA Sandžaka – Guardians of Sandžak", won 12,596 votes (0.29%) and one seat, one fewer than in 2023, according to the final results announced on 5 November. The seat went to the list's leader, Ahmedin Škrijelj, an MP in the outgoing Assembly.

== Electoral performance ==
=== Parliamentary elections ===
National Assembly of Serbia
Year	Leader	Popular vote	% of popular vote	#	# of seats	Seat change	Coalition	Status
1990	Sulejman Ugljanin	84,156	1.75%	▲5th	3 / 250	▲3	–	Opposition
1992	Sulejman Ugljanin	Election boycott			0 / 250	▼3	–	Extra-parliamentary
1993	Sulejman Ugljanin	Election boycott			0 / 250	0	–	Extra-parliamentary
1997	Sulejman Ugljanin	49,486	1.25%	▲8th	3 / 250	▲3	LzS	Opposition
2000	Sulejman Ugljanin	Election boycott			0 / 250	▼3	–	Extra-parliamentary
2003	Sulejman Ugljanin	481,249	12.75%	▲3rd	1 / 250	▲1	SDAS–BDSS–SLPS–DS–GS–DC–SDU	Opposition
2007	Sulejman Ugljanin	33,823	0.85%	▼11th	2 / 250	▲1	LzS	Opposition
2008	Sulejman Ugljanin	38,148	0.94%	▲7th	1 / 250	▼1	BLzES	Government
2012	Sulejman Ugljanin	27,708	0.74%	▼12th	2 / 250	▲1	–	Government
2014	Sulejman Ugljanin	35,157	1.01%	12th	3 / 250	▲1	–	Opposition
2016	Sulejman Ugljanin	30,092	0.82%	▲11th	2 / 250	▼1	–	Opposition
2020	Sulejman Ugljanin	24,676	0.80%	▼15th	3 / 250	▲1	–	Opposition
2022	Sulejman Ugljanin	20,553	0.56%	15th	2 / 250	▼1	–	Opposition
2023	Sulejman Ugljanin	21,827	0.59%	▲12th	2 / 250	▲1	–	Opposition
2026	Sulejman Ugljanin	12,596	0.29%	▲9th	1 / 250	▼1	–	TBA

=== Local elections ===
Local election	Council											
Local election	Novi Pazar		Tutin		Sjenica		Prijepolje		Priboj		Total won / Total contested	
2012	14 / 47	New	21 / 37	New	12 / 39	New	6 / 61	New	3 / 41	New	56 / 252	New
2016	11 / 47	▼3	22 / 37	▲1	15 / 39	▲3	3 / 61	▼3	4 / 41	▲1	55 / 252	▼1
2020	9 / 47	▼2	18 / 37	▼4	9 / 39	▼6	1 / 61	▼2	2 / 41	▼2	39 / 252	▼16

== See also ==
- Bosniaks in Serbia
- Bosniak National Council (Serbia)

== Sources ==
Books

- Ahrens, Geert-Hinrich (2007). Diplomacy on the Edge: Containment of Ethnic Conflict and the Minorities Working Group of the Conferences on Yugoslavia. Washington, D. C.: Woodrow Wilson Center Press. ISBN 978-0801885570.
- Bugajski, Janusz (1994). Ethnic Politics in Eastern Europe: A Guide to Nationality Policies, Organizations, and Parties. Armonk, NY: M. E. Sharpe. ISBN 1563242826.
- Bugajski, Janusz (2002). Political Parties of Eastern Europe: A Guide to Politics in the Post-Communist Era. M.E. Sharpe. ISBN 9781563246760.
- Poulton, Hugh; Taji-Farouki, Suha (1997). Muslim Identity and the Balkan State. London: C. Hurst & Co. Publishers. ISBN 1850652767.
- Stojarová, Vera; Emerson, Peter (2013). Party Politics in the Western Balkans. London: Routledge. ISBN 978-1135235857.
- Szöcsik, Edina; Bochsler, Daniel (2014). "On Fissions and Fusions of Ethnic Minority Parties". New Nation-States and National Minorities. Colchester: ECPR Press. ISBN 978-1907301865.

Other

- "Prvi rezultati izbora za nacionalne savete manjina". Blic (in Serbian). 27 October 2014.
- "O nama" (in Bosnian). Bosniac National Council. Archived from the original on 12 June 2015.
