= Bosniaks of Serbia =

Ethnic group

Бошњаци у Србији Bošnjaci u Srbiji
- Ethnic flag of Bosniaks in Serbia

Total population
- 153,801 (2022)

Regions with significant populations
- Raška District: 115,640
- Zlatibor District: 35,346

Languages
- Bosnian and Serbian (standard varieties of Serbo-Croatian)

Religion
- Sunni Islam

Related ethnic groups
- Serbs, Albanians

Bosniaks are a recognized ethnic minority in Serbia. According to data from the 2022 census, the population of ethnic Bosniaks in Serbia is 153,801, constituting 2.3% of the total population, thus being the third-largest ethnic group in the country, after Serbs and Hungarians (the largest ethnic minority in Serbia). The vast majority of Bosniaks live in the southwestern part of the country, bordering Montenegro and Kosovo, in the region historically known as Sandžak, and are therefore colloquially referred to as Sandžaklije. Before the 1990s, the majority of the Bosniaks in Serbia self-identified as ethnic Muslims.

Bosniaks make up the basis of the Muslim community in Serbia; some 55% of all Muslims in Serbia are ethnic Bosniaks, while the rest are ethnic Albanians and Romani people.

== History ==
Many Bosniaks, then ethnic Muslims, emigrated from the Sandžak region to Turkey after the dissolution of the Ottoman Empire.

The first major political organization of ethnic Muslims from Sandžak was established at the 1917 Sjenica Conference, held during the Austro-Hungarian occupation of the former Sanjak of Novi Pazar. The ethnic Muslim representatives at the conference decided to ask the Austro-Hungarian authorities to separate the Sanjak of Novi Pazar from Kingdom of Serbia and Kingdom of Montenegro and merge it with Bosnia and Herzegovina, or at least to give autonomy to the region.

After the end of World War I and the creation of the Kingdom of Serbs, Croats, and Slovenes in 1918, the Sandžak region became a part of the newly created country.

The Muslims in Sandžak organized themselves together with the Albanians into the Džemijet party, that was acting in the area of present-day Kosovo, North Macedonia, and Sandžak. The main goal of the Džemijet was the protection of the interests of Muslims and Albanians. District and municipal branches of Džemijet in Sandžak were founded in 1922 at the highly attended meeting in Novi Pazar. Party advocated for Muslim unity behind Džemijet instead of division by various pan-national political parties, such was the case at the 1920 Constitutional Assembly election, when the Muslims in Sandžak overwhelimgly voted for the People's Radical Party, due to a promise made to several influential Muslims that they would be compensated for losing their lands during the agrarian reform.

== Demographics ==
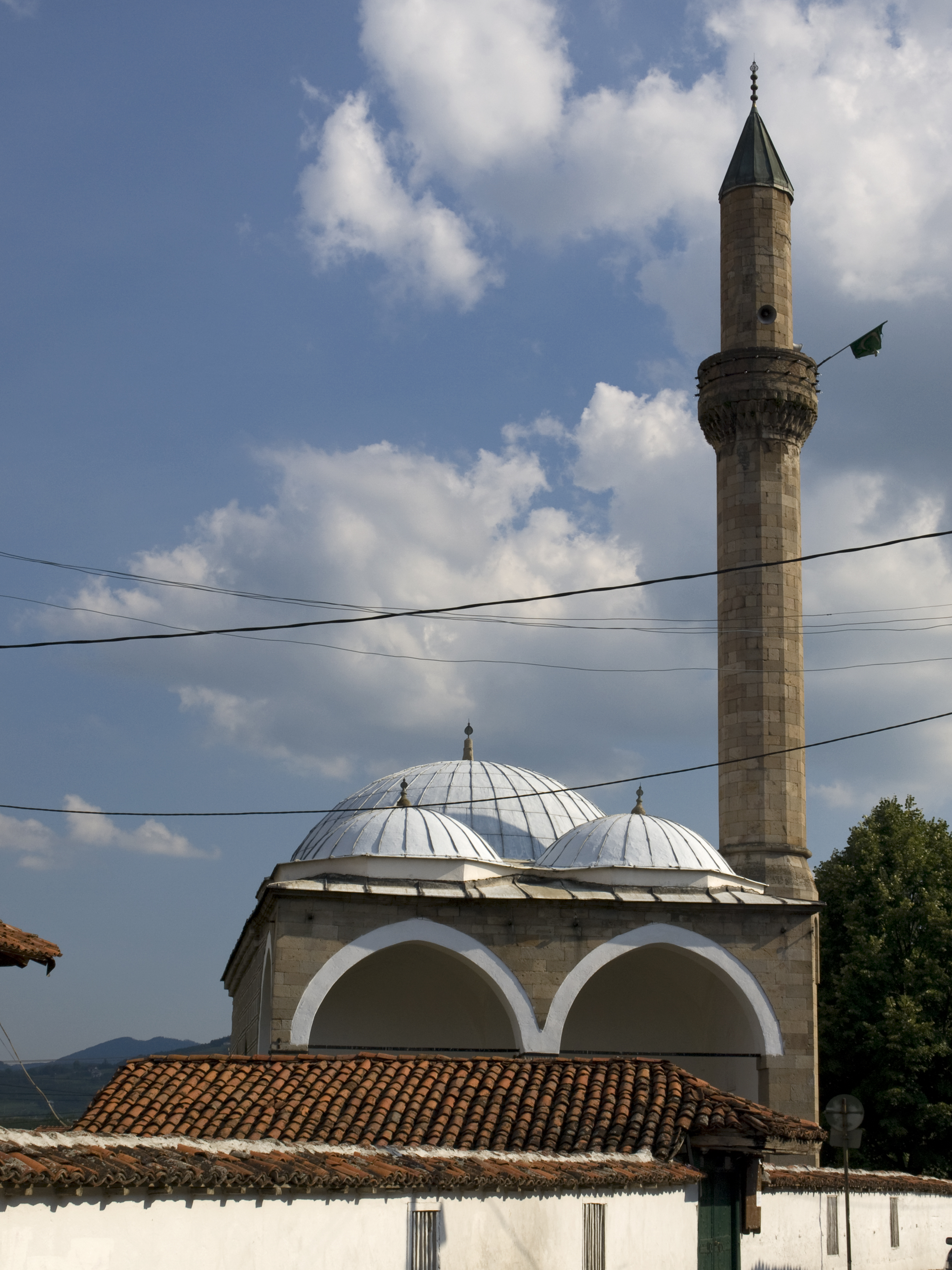
Altun-Alem Mosque in Novi Pazar

The largest concentration of ethnic Bosniaks in Serbia are to be found in Sandžak. They form majority of population in the city of Novi Pazar (79.8% of population), which is a cultural center of Bosniaks in Serbia, as well as in two municipalities: Tutin (92%) and Sjenica (73%). Bosniaks constitute significant part of population in three other municipalities in Sandžak: Prijepolje (39.8% of population), Priboj (17.6%), and Nova Varoš (5%). Ethnographic studies estimate that significant part of population of Sandžak (Pešter area, in particular; specifically Boroštica, Doliće, and Ugao villages) who identify as Bosniak do so on the account of religious identity as Muslims, but are of Albanian ethnic descent. They have adopted a Bosniak identity in censuses, due to intermarriage, during the period of the socialist Yugoslavia, or due to sociopolitical discrimination against Albanians following the breakup of Yugoslavia.

The remaining part of ethnic Bosniak population is scattered throughout the country, mainly to Belgrade, and are consisted of Bosniaks from Bosnia and Herzegovina (and their descendants) that migrated to Serbia during the second half of 20th century as economic inter-Yugoslav migrants.

== Politics ==
The Bosniak National Council is a representation body of the Bosniak ethnic minority in Serbia, established for the protection of the rights and the minority self-government of Bosniaks in Serbia.

The Party of Democratic Action of Sandžak, Sandžak Democratic Party and Justice and Reconciliation Party are the ethnic minority parties representing interests of Bosniaks in Serbia.

== Notable people ==
- Enver Alivodić – football player
- Dina Džanković – beauty pageant titleholder
- Ejup Ganić – politician
- Enver Hadžiabdić – football player
- Senad Hadžifejzović – journalist and news anchor
- Sefer Halilović – general
- Mustafa Hasanagić – football player
- Marco Huck – boxer, Bosniak paternal and maternal descent
- Emina Jahović – singer
- Asmir Kolašinac – athlete
- Hena Kurtagić – volleyball player
- Adem Ljajić – football player
- Rasim Ljajić – politician
- Erhan Mašović – football player
- Hamad Medjedovic – tennis player
- Irfan Mensur – actor
- Mirza Šoljanin – singer
- Mirsad Terzić – handball player
- Amela Terzić – athlete
- Alem Toskić – handball player
- Mirsad Türkcan – basketball player
- Hedo Türkoğlu – basketball player
- Sulejman Ugljanin – politician
- Hasan Zvizdić – World War II military commander
- Muamer Zukorlić – mufti

== See also ==
- Bosniaks of Montenegro
- Muslims (ethnic group)
- Serb Muslims
- Bosnia and Herzegovina–Serbia relations
