= József Sándor (politician) =

Serbian politician (born 1961)

József Sándor (Serbian Cyrillic: Јожеф Шандор, romanized: Jožef Šandor; born 22 October 1961) is a politician in Serbia from the country's Hungarian national minority community. He served in the Assembly of Vojvodina from 2004 to 2012 and in the National Assembly of Serbia from 2012 to 2013 as a member of G17 Plus and the successor United Regions of Serbia (Ujedinjeni regioni Srbije, URS). He is now a member of the Municipal Assembly of Senta, where he is the leader of an independent group.

== Early life and private career ==
Sándor was born in Senta, Autonomous Province of Vojvodina, in what was then the People's Republic of Serbia in the Federal People's Republic of Yugoslavia. He trained as a manager and has been the director of the agricultural cooperative Napredak in the village of Gornji Breg.

== Politician ==
=== Assembly of Vojvodina (2004–12) ===
Sándor was first elected to the Vojvodina assembly in the 2004 provincial election, for the division of Senta. He was one of only two G17 Plus candidates elected in this cycle. He later appeared in the 248th position (out of 250) on the party's electoral list in the 2007 Serbian parliamentary election. The party won nineteen seats, and he was not awarded a mandate. (From 2000 to 2011, Serbian parliamentary mandates were awarded to sponsoring parties or coalitions rather than to individual candidates, and it was common practice for the mandates to be distributed out of numerical order. Sándor could have been assigned a mandate despite his low position on the list, which was in any event mostly alphabetical, although he was not.)

Sándor was a substitute member of Serbia's delegation to the Chamber of Regions in the Council of Europe's Congress of Local and Regional Authorities during his first term in the Vojvodina assembly.

G17 Plus contested the 2008 Vojvodina provincial election in an alliance with the Democratic Party (Demokratska stranka, DS), called For a European Serbia, and Sándor was re-elected for Senta under the alliance's banner. For a European Serbia won an outright majority in the assembly, and Sándor served as a supporter of the provincial administration. He also received the first position on G17 Plus's list for Senta in the concurrent 2008 local elections, although he did not take a mandate in the municipal assembly afterwards.

In 2010, G17 Plus formed the URS as an umbrella alliance with smaller regionalist parties across Serbia. The following year, Serbia's electoral laws were reformed such that mandates in elections held under proportional representation were awarded to candidates on successful lists in numerical order.

Sándor sought re-election as the URS's candidate in Senta in the 2012 provincial election and was defeated. He was also given the twenty-second position on the alliance's list in the concurrent 2012 Serbian parliamentary election and was not initially elected when the list won only sixteen seats. He led the URS's list for the Senta municipal assembly in the 2012 local elections and this time was elected when the list won three seats. He briefly served as deputy president of the assembly, although he stood down from this role after accepting a mandate in the national assembly.

=== Parliamentarian and after (2012–present) ===
The Serbian Progressive Party (Srpska napredna stranka, SNS) and the Socialist Party of Serbia (Socijalistička partija Srbije, SPS) formed a coalition government after the 2012 parliamentary election, and the URS was initially included as a junior partner in the administration. Sándor was awarded a parliamentary mandate on 29 August 2012 as a replacement for Vidoje Petrović, who resigned because he could not hold a dual mandate as a parliamentarian and mayor of Loznica. For the next year, he served as a supporter of the administration. In March 2013, he was part of Serbia's delegation to a conference in Sarajevo of countries participating in the Stabilisation and Association Process.

The URS became a unified political party on 20 April 2013, and G17 Plus formally merged into the new entity. Shortly thereafter, on 31 July 2013, the URS was removed from Serbia's coalition government and became part of the opposition. Sándor was one of three party delegates who subsequently resigned from the assembly on 2 September 2013 to allow the former URS ministers in Serbia's government to reclaim their parliamentary seats. He appeared in the forty-seventh position on the URS's list in the 2014 Serbian parliamentary election. The party failed to cross the electoral threshold to win representation in the assembly and dissolved in 2015.

Sándor affiliated with Hungarian Movement after leaving parliament and appeared in the fourth position on the party's list in Senta in the 2016 local elections. He was re-elected to the municipal assembly when the list won five mandates. He later led the independent Citizens' Movement for Senta list in the 2020 local elections and was again re-elected when the list won three mandates.

== Electoral record ==
=== Provincial (Vojvodina) ===
2012 Vojvodina assembly election Senta (constituency seat) - First and Second Rounds
Anikó Zsíros Jankelić	Choice for a Better Vojvodina–Bojan Pajtić (Affiliation: Democratic Party)	3,395	31.08	5,183	53.08
Attila Juhász	Alliance of Vojvodina Hungarians	3,675	33.64	4,581	46.92
József Sándor (incumbent)	Coalition: United Regions of Serbia–József Sándor	1,502	13.75		
Tatjana Radović	Socialist Party of Serbia (SPS)–Party of United Pensioners of Serbia (PUPS)–United Serbia (JS)–Social Democratic Party of Serbia (SDP Serbia)	762	6.98		
Tibor Kazinci	Hungarian Civic Alliance	670	6.13		
Karolj Čizik	Coalition: League of Social Democrats of Vojvodina–Nenad Čanak	427	3.91		
Tibor Menjhart	Hungarian Hope Movement	289	2.65		
Endre Tot	Serbian Radical Party	204	1.87		
Total valid votes		10,924	100	9,764	100

2008 Vojvodina assembly election Senta (constituency seat) - First and Second Rounds
József Sándor (incumbent)	For a European Vojvodina, Democratic Party–G17 Plus–Boris Tadić (Affiliation: G17 Plus)	2,678	20.07	4,016	50.50
Dr. Emil Farkaš	Hungarian Coalition–István Pásztor	4,451	33.35	3,936	49.70
László Rác Szabó	Hungarian Civic Alliance	1,758	13.17		
Mr. Mihalj Vašaš	Vojvodina's Party	1,467	10.99		
Boris Zec	Together for Vojvodina–Nenad Čanak	1,178	8.83		
Zoltan Vatai	Liberal Democratic Party	791	5.93		
Vesna Fabrik	Serbian Radical Party	558	4.18		
Gavrilo Đurišić	"Democratic Party of Serbia–New Serbia–Vojislav Koštunica"	464	3.48		
Total valid votes		13,345	100	7,952	100
Invalid ballots		301		181	
Total votes casts		13,646	61.66	8,133	36.75

2004 Vojvodina assembly election Senta (constituency seat) - First and Second Rounds
József Sándor	G17 Plus	1,718	21.71	4,306	60.74
Bela Buranj (incumbent)	Alliance of Vojvodina Hungarians	2,296	29.01	2,783	39.26
Ištvan Kiralj	Reformists of Vojvodina–Social Democratic Party	1,265	15.98		
Boris Zec	Together for Vojvodina–Nenad Čanak	1,210	15.29		
Zorica Frik	Strength of Serbia Movement	986	12.46		
Vladimir Matić	Serbian Radical Party	439	5.55		
Total valid votes		7,914	100	7,089	100
Invalid ballots		434		255	
Total votes casts		8,348	37.83	7,344	33.28
