= Áron Csonka =

Serbian politician (born 1976)

- Арон Чонка

Member of the Assembly of Vojvodina
- In office 2016–2020

Personal details
- Born: 25 November 1976 (age 49) Ada, Vojvodina, Serbia, Yugoslavia
- Party: DZVM
- Education: University of Novi Sad

Áron Csonka (Serbian Cyrillic: Арон Чонка, romanized: Aron Čonka; born 25 November 1976) is a Serbian politician. An ethnic Hungarian, he has been the leader of the Democratic Fellowship of Vojvodina Hungarians (Vajdasági Magyarok Demokratikus Közössége, VMDK). He was a member of the Assembly of Vojvodina from 2016 to 2020.

== Early life and private career ==
Csonka is a graduate of the University of Novi Sad's Faculty of Philosophy, holding a degree in Serbian language and literature. He was taught the Serbian language at the technical high school in Ada.

== Politician ==
=== Early years (2000–10) ===
Csonka was first elected to the Ada municipal assembly in the 2000 Serbian local elections, which the VMDK contested in a local alliance with other Hungarian parties and the Democratic Party (Demokratska stranka, DS). He was re-elected in the 2004 local elections, in which the VMDK ran its own list and won three mandates. He also ran for the Ada constituency seat in the 2004 Vojvodina provincial election and was defeated.

The VMDK joined the Hungarian Coalition in 2008, and Csonka appeared in the lead position on the coalition's electoral list in Ada for the 2008 local elections. He was re-elected after the list won nine mandates. When the municipal assembly convened, he was chosen as its president (i.e., speaker) for the term that followed. Csonka also appeared on the Hungarian Coalition's lists in the 2008 Serbian parliamentary election and the 2008 Vojvodina provincial election, although he was not given a mandate at either level.

=== VMDK party leader (2010–present) ===
Csonka was chosen as the VMDK's leader in October 2010, following the unexpected death of Sándor Páll.

The VMDK contested the 2012 Serbian parliamentary election as part of the All Together political coalition, and, as a party leader, Csonka was given the fifth position on the list. All Together won only a single mandate, which went to its lead candidate, Emir Elfić. Csonka was also defeated for the Ada constituency seat in the concurrent 2012 provincial election. The VMDK contested the 2012 local election in Ada on its own; Csonka led the party's list and was re-elected when it won a single mandate.

For the 2014 Serbian parliamentary election, the VMDK joined Boris Tadić's coalition list, and Csonka appeared in the fiftieth position. The list won eighteen mandates and he was not elected.

Csonka was elected to the Vojvodina assembly in the 2016 provincial election, which the VMDK contested with the Hungarian Movement; he appeared in the second position on the alliance's list and was elected when it won two mandates. The election was won by the Serbian Progressive Party (Srpska napredna stranka, SNS) and its allies, and Csonka served in opposition. He also led the alliance's list for Ada in the 2016 local elections and was elected to a fifth term locally when the list won two mandates. The VMDK did not contest the 2016 Serbian parliamentary election; Csonka encouraged the party's supporters to reject "chauvinist parties of the extreme right" and vote for "the guardians of the fire of democratic values at the republic level."

The VMDK joined the Alliance for Serbia (Savez za Srbiju, SzS), a broad coalition of parties opposition to Aleksandar Vučić's administration, in 2019. It later joined the successor United Opposition of Serbia (Udružena Opozicija Srbije, UOPS) and boycotted the 2020 Serbian elections.

=== Hungarian community representative ===
Csonka is a supporter of increased autonomy for the Hungarian community in Vojvodina. In 2013, he was quoted as saying, "If 80,000 Serbs from four municipalities in Kosovo will get broad autonomy, the realization of which has already begun on the basis of the Brussels Agreement, in that case Hungarians in the southern regions [i.e., Vojvodina] rightly demand broad autonomy."

He was the VMDK's list bearer in the 2014 elections for Serbia's Hungarian National Council, though he chose to appear in the thirty-fifth and final position on its list. Election from this position was a statistical impossibility, and he was not elected when the list won two mandates.

Although the VMDK has sometimes co-operated with the rival Alliance of Vojvodina Hungarians (Vajdasági Magyar Szövetség, VMSZ), Csonka has often been critical of the party and its leader István Pásztor. In 2019, he accused the VMSZ of having become in some respects a branch of the SNS in Vojvodina.

== Electoral record ==
=== Provincial (Vojvodina) ===
2012 Vojvodina provincial election: Ada
Candidate	Party	First round		Second round	
Candidate	Party	Votes	%	Votes	%
József Tóbiás (incumbent)	"Choice for a Better Vojvodina–Bojan Pajtic" (Affiliation: Democratic Party)	3,816	42.75	6,144	78.92
Ferenc Ürményi	United Regions of Serbia–Ferenc Ürményi	1,452	16.27	1,641	21.08
Ferenc Illés	Alliance of Vojvodina Hungarians–Pásztor István	1,366	15.30		
Stevan Morović	Let's Get Vojvodina Moving–Tomislav Nikolić: Serbian Progressive Party, New Serbia, Movement of Socialists, Strength of Serbia Movement (Affiliation: Serbian Progressive Party)	644	7.21		
Áron Csonka	Democratic Fellowship of Vojvodina Hungarians	638	7.15		
Jószef Bernát	Ivica Dačić–Socialist Party of Serbia (SPS), Party of United Pensioners of Serbia (PUPS), United Serbia (JS), Social Democratic Party of Serbia (SDP Serbia)	436	4.88		
Rudolf Krizsán	League of Social Democrats of Vojvodina–Nenad Čanak	423	4.74		
Attila Sipos	Hungarian Hope Movement	151	1.69		
Total		8,926	100.00	7,785	100.00

2004 Vojvodina provincial election: Ada
Candidate	Party	First round		Second round	
Candidate	Party	Votes	%	Votes	%
József Micsíz	Citizens' Group: With Knowledge and Heart for a Successful Municipality–Ürményi Ferenc Feco	3,494	47.66	4,039	65.41
Sándor Bakos	Alliance of Vojvodina Hungarians	892	12.17	2,136	34.59
Zoltán Palatinus	Coalition: Together for Vojvodina–Nenad Čanak	860	11.73		
Áron Csonka	Democratic Fellowship of Vojvodina Hungarians	840	11.46		
István Zolcer	Democratic Party (Demokratska partija)	554	7.56		
Valerija Stražmešterov	Serbian Radical Party	364	4.97		
István Sterbik	G17 Plus	327	4.46		
Total		7,331	100.00	6,175	100.00
Valid votes		7,331	96.42	6,175	97.49
Invalid/blank votes		272	3.58	159	2.51
Total votes		7,603	100.00	6,334	100.00
