= List of political parties in Serbia =

This article lists political parties in Serbia, including parties that existed in the Kingdom of Serbia between the early 1860s and 1918.

== Contemporary parties ==
=== Parties represented in the National Assembly ===
The table below lists the parties whose candidates won seats in the 2026 Serbian parliamentary election, held on 25 October 2026, with voting repeated at 53 polling stations on 1 November, according to the final results announced by the Republic Electoral Commission on 5 November 2026. The largest group in the incoming National Assembly, the Student List, with 140 seats, is a citizens' group (grupa građana) rather than a registered political party, and is listed separately.

Electoral list / party		Abbr.	Leader(s)	Ideology	Political position	Seats
Aleksandar Vučić – United Serbia (Note: The seats shown are those won by the whole list; the Serbian People's Party and the Vlach National Party also took part in it.)	Serbian Progressive Party	SNS	Miloš Vučević	Populism; Neoliberalism	Big tent	103 / 250
Aleksandar Vučić – United Serbia	PUPS – Solidarity and Justice	PUPS	Milan Krkobabić	Pensioners' interests	Single-issue	103 / 250
Aleksandar Vučić – United Serbia	Serbian Radical Party	SRS	Vojislav Šešelj	Ultranationalism	Far-right	103 / 250
Aleksandar Vučić – United Serbia	Workers' Party	RP	Željko Veselinović	Workers' rights; Euroscepticism	—	103 / 250
Aleksandar Vučić – United Serbia	People's Peasant Party	NSS	Marijan Rističević	Agrarianism	Right-wing	103 / 250
Aleksandar Vučić – United Serbia	United Peasant Party	USS	Milija Miletić	Agrarianism	Centre-right	103 / 250
Aleksandar Vučić – United Serbia	Bosniak-Serb Alliance	BOSS	Samir Tandir	Bosniak minority interests	—	103 / 250
National minority lists
Alliance of Vojvodina Hungarians		VMSZ/SVM	Bálint Pásztor	Hungarian minority interests; Regionalism; Conservatism	Centre-right	2 / 250
Albanian Coalition (Note: A joint list of eight Albanian parties from Preševo, Bujanovac and Medveđa, led by the Party for Democratic Action.)	Party for Democratic Action	PVD/PDD	Shaip Kamberi	Albanian minority interests	—	2 / 250
Albanian Coalition	Other parties	—		Albanian minority interests	—	2 / 250
Rasim Ljajić – Ljudski	Sandžak Democratic Party	SDP	Samir Lekić	Bosniak minority interests	Centre-left	1 / 250
Rasim Ljajić – Ljudski	Montenegrin Democratic Party	CDP	Ratko Minić	Montenegrin minority interests	—	1 / 250
Party of Democratic Action of Sandžak		SDAS	Sulejman Ugljanin	Bosniak minority interests; Bosniak nationalism; Autonomism	Centre-right to right-wing	1 / 250
Justice and Reconciliation Party		SPP	Usame Zukorlić	Bosniak minority interests; Conservatism	Centre-right to right-wing	1 / 250
Citizens' group (not a political party)
Student List		SL	None (Note: Ilija Srdanović was the first candidate on the list.)	Reformism; Anti-corruption	Big tent	140 / 250
Total						250

=== Non-parliamentary parties ===
The following political parties were previously represented in the National Assembly, but won no seats in the 2026 Serbian parliamentary election.

Name	Founded	Ideology	Political position	Leader
Bosniak Democratic Union (BDZ)	2010	Bosniak minority interests	—	Emir Elfić
Bosniak People's Party (BNS)	2012	Bosniak minority interests	—	Mujo Muković
Civic Platform (GP)	2017	Liberalism	Centre	Jovan Jovanović
Democratic Alliance of Croats in Vojvodina (DSHV)	1990	Croat minority interests	—	Tomislav Žigmanov
Democratic Fellowship of Vojvodina Hungarians (VMDK)	1990	Hungarian minority interests	Centre	Áron Csonka
Democratic Party (DS)	1990	Social democracy	Centre-left	Srđan Milivojević
Democratic Party of Macedonians (DPM)	2004	Macedonian minority interests	—	Nenad Krsteski
Dveri	1999	Right-wing populism	Right-wing to far-right	Ivan Kostić
Ecological Uprising (EU)	2021	Green politics; Pro-Europeanism	Centre-left	Aleksandar Jovanović Ćuta
Enough is Enough (DJB)	2014	Right-wing populism	Right-wing to far-right	Saša Radulović
Fatherland	2017	Kosovo Serb interests	—	Slaviša Ristić
Green–Left Front (ZLF)	2023	Green politics; Progressivism	Left-wing	Biljana Đorđević; Radomir Lazović; (co-presidents)
Greens of Serbia (ZS)	2007	Green politics	Centre-left	Ivan Karić
Healthy Serbia (ZS)	2017	Populism; National conservatism	Right-wing	Milan Stamatović
League of Social Democrats of Vojvodina (LSV)	1990	Vojvodina autonomism	Centre-left	Bojan Kostreš
Liberal Democratic Party (LDP)	2005	Liberalism	Centre	Čedomir Jovanović
Movement for the Restoration of the Kingdom of Serbia (POKS)	2017	Monarchism; National conservatism	Right-wing	Vojislav Mihailović
Movement of Free Citizens (PSG)	2017	Liberalism; Social liberalism	Centre	Pavle Grbović
Movement of Socialists (PS)	2008	Left-wing nationalism; Social conservatism	Centre-left	Bojan Torbica
National Network (NM)	2015	Serbian nationalism; Social conservatism	Right-wing to far-right	Vladan Glišić
New Democratic Party of Serbia (NDSS)	1992	National conservatism	Right-wing	Miloš Jovanović (Note: Jovanović announced his resignation on 26 October 2026, after the party failed to enter the National Assembly.)
New Face of Serbia (NLS)	2022	Conservatism	Centre-right	Miloš Parandilović
New Serbia (NS)	1998	Conservatism	Right-wing	Velimir Ilić
Party of Freedom and Justice (SSP)	2019	Social democracy	Centre-left	Dragan Đilas
Party of Modern Serbia (SMS)	2018	Liberalism	Centre	Collective leadership
People's Movement of Serbia (NPS)	2023	Anti-corruption; Conservatism	Centre-right	Miroslav Aleksić
People's Party (Narodna)	2017	Conservatism	Right-wing	Vladimir Gajić
Reformists of Vojvodina (RV)	1990	Vojvodina autonomism	Centre-left	Nedeljko Šljivanac
Roma Party (RP)	2003	Romani minority interests	—	Srđan Šajn
Roma Union of Serbia (URS)	2004	Romani minority interests	—	Miloš Mihajlović
Russian Party (RS)	2013	Russian minority interests	—	Slobodan Nikolić
Serbia Centre (SRCE)	2022	Liberalism; Pro-Europeanism	Centre	Vacant (Note: Zdravko Ponoš resigned as president on 3 November 2026; the party's Presidency and Executive Board lead it until an electoral assembly.)
Serbian Left (SL)	2022	Socialism	Left-wing	Vacant
Serbian Party Oathkeepers (SSZ)	2012	Ultranationalism; Social conservatism	Far-right	Milica Đurđević Stamenkovski
Serbian People's Party (SNP)	2014	National conservatism; Right-wing populism	Right-wing	Nenad Popović
Serbian Renewal Movement (SPO)	1990	Liberalism; Monarchism	Centre-right	Aleksandar Cvetković
Social Democratic Party (SDS)	2014	Social democracy	Centre-left	Boris Tadić
Social Democratic Party of Serbia (SDPS)	2009	Social democracy	Centre-left	Jug Radivojević
Socialist Party of Serbia (SPS)	1990	Social democracy; Populism	Centre-left (Note: Some analysts consider SPS left-leaning only nominally; in 2026, political analyst Zoran Lutovac described it as "a populist party completely fused with the Serbian Progressive Party".)	Ivica Dačić
Strength of Serbia Movement (PSS)	2004	Conservatism	Centre-right	Bogoljub Karić
There's no Going Back – Serbia Is Behind (NN–IJS)	2022	National conservatism	Right-wing	Aleksandar Jerković
Together for Vojvodina (ZZV)	2011	Rusyn minority interests	Centre-left	Olena Papuga
United Serbia (JS)	2004	National conservatism; Populism	Right-wing	Dalibor Marković
We – Power of the People (MI–SN)	2024	Nationalism; Populism	Right-wing	Branimir Nestorović

=== Minor parties ===
The following list includes political parties that have not been represented in the National Assembly yet, although they either took part in parliamentary elections or received certain attention in the public.

- Alternative for Changes (est. 2015)
- Bunjevci Citizens of Serbia (est. 2008)
- Democratic Union of Croats (est. 2007)
- Hungarian Civic Alliance (est. 2006)
- Independent Serbian Party (est. 2020)
- Leviathan Movement (est. 2020)
- Liberation (est. 2020)
- Montenegrin Party (est. 2008)
- New Communist Party of Yugoslavia (est. 1990)
- Party of Labour (est. 1992)
- Party of the Radical Left (est. 2020)
- People's Freedom Movement (est. 2016)
- People's Strong Serbia (est. 2017)
- Pirate Party of Serbia (est. 2022)
- Serbian Right (est. 2018)
- Slovaks Forward (est. 2015)
- Vlach National Party (est. 2004)

== Historical parties ==
The following list includes political parties that existed in the Kingdom of Serbia (1881–1918), Socialist Republic of Serbia (1945–1990), and the Republic of Serbia (1990–present).

- Association for the Yugoslav Democratic Initiative (1989–1992)
- Better Serbia (2017–2023)
- Bosniak Democratic Party of Sandžak (1996–2017)
- Christian Democratic Party of Serbia (1997–2017)
- Civic Alliance of Serbia (1992–2007)
- Civic Initiative of Gora (2002–2008)
- Communist Party (2010–2022)
- Conservatives (1858–1895)
- Council of Serbian Unity (2013–2014)
- Croatian Bunjevac-Šokac Party (2004–2011)
- Croatian Syrmian Initiative (2008–2011)
- Croatian National Alliance (1998–2004)
- Democratic Alternative (1997–2004)
- Democratic Centre (1996–2003)
- Democratic Community of Serbia (2006–2008)
- Democratic Fatherland Party (2002–2010)
- Democratic Party of Bosniaks (est. 1990; defunct)
- Do not let Belgrade drown (2014–2023)
- Federal Party of Yugoslavs (1990–2010)
- G17 Plus (2002–2013)
- Green Ecological Party (2008–2019)
- Green Party (2014–2021)
- Hungarian Hope Movement (2009–2018)
- I Live for Krajina (2006–2017)
- Independent Democratic Party of Serbia (2015–2019)
- Independent Radical Party (1901–1918)
- League for Šumadija (1997–2007)
- League of Communists – Movement for Yugoslavia (1990–1994)
- League of Communists of Serbia (1945–1990)
- League of Communists of Vojvodina (1945–1990)
- League of Communists of Yugoslavia in Serbia (1998–2010)
- Liberals (1883–1895)
- Liberal Party/Liberal Democratic Party (1989–2010)
- New Democracy/Liberals of Serbia (1990–2010)
- Movement for Reversal (2015–2025)
- Movement of Workers and Peasants (2011–2014)
- Natural Law Party (1992–1993)
- New Party (2013–2022)
- Obraz (1993–2012)
- Otpor (1998–2004)
- Party of Serbian Progress (2000–2010)
- Party of Serbian Unity (1993–2007)
- Peasants Party of Serbia (1990–2009)
- People's Democratic Party (2003–2004)
- People's Party (1990–1995; 1997–2010)
- People's Party (2008–2012)
- People's Radical Party (1881–1945)
- People's Radical Party (1990–2010)
- Reformist Party (2005–2018)
- Rich Serbia (2011–2015)
- Serb Democratic Party (2011–2016)
- Serbia 21 (2020)
- Serbian Democratic Renewal Movement (2005–2010)
- Serbian Left (2015–2019)
- Serbian Liberal Party (1991–2010)
- Serbian Patriotic Alliance (2018–2021)
- Serbian National Renewal (1990–1996)
- Serbian Progressive Party (1881–1918)
- Serbian Radical Party – Nikola Pašić (1994–1998)
- Serbian Social Democratic Party (1903–1919)
- Social Democracy (1997–2010)
- Social Democratic Party (2002–2010)
- Social Democratic Union (1996–2002; 2003–2020)
- Social Liberal Party of Sandžak (until 2010)
- Socialist People's Party (2002–2006)
- Third Serbia (2012–2015)
- Third Serbia – Rich Serbia (2015–2016)
- Together (2022–2024)
- Together for Šumadija (2009–2013; 2015–2020)
- Together for Serbia (2012–2022)
- Union of Reform Forces of Yugoslavia (1990–1991)
- United Regions of Serbia (2013–2015)
- Yugoslav Left (1994–2010)

== See also ==
- List of political parties in Yugoslavia – contains a list of political parties in the period of Kingdom (1918–1941) and then Socialist Federal Republic of Yugoslavia (1945–1991)
- List of political parties in Kosovo
