= Anikó Zsíros Jankelić =

Serbian politician

Anikó Zsíros Jankelić (Serbian Cyrillic: Анико Жирош Јанкелић, romanized: Aniko Žiroš Jankelić; born 25 February 1967) is a politician in Serbia. She has served at different times in the National Assembly of Serbia and the Assembly of Vojvodina as a member of the Democratic Party (Demokratska stranka, DS). She is now a member of Municipal Assembly of Senta, serving with the Alliance of Vojvodina Hungarians (Vajdasági Magyar Szövetség, VMSZ).

== Early life and private career ==
Zsíros Jankelić was born in Senta, in what was then the Socialist Autonomous Province of Vojvodina in the Socialist Republic of Serbia, Socialist Federal Republic of Yugoslavia. She is a teacher of physical education, has taught rhythmic gymnastics, and has worked at the School of Economics and Trade in Senta.

== Politician ==
=== Parliamentarian and local assembly speaker ===
Zsíros Jankelić was elected to the Senta municipal assembly in the 2004 Serbian local elections and was chosen as its president (i.e. speaker) for the term that followed. She led the DS's electoral list in Senta for the 2008 local elections and received a new mandate after the list won nine seats. When the assembly convened, she was chosen for a second term as its president.

The Democratic Party contested the 2008 Serbian parliamentary election, which was held concurrently with the local elections, as the dominant party in the For a European Serbia alliance; Zsíros Jankelić was given the forty-eighth position on the alliance's list. The list won 102 seats, and she was not initially included in her party's assembly delegation. (From 2000 to 2011, mandates in Serbian parliamentary elections were awarded to sponsoring parties or coalitions rather than to individual candidates, and it was common practice for the mandates to be distributed out of numerical order. Zsíros Jankelić's position on the list had no specific bearing on her chances of election.) The overall results of the election were initially inconclusive, but For a European Serbia eventually formed a coalition government with the Socialist Party of Serbia (Socijalistička partija Srbije, SPS).

On 18 December 2009, Zsíros Jankelić was awarded a parliamentary mandate as the replacement for Nandor Maraci, a fellow DS member from the North Banat District who had died. She served as a supporter of the administration for the remainder of the term. At the local level in Senta, she called a vote of non-confidence in VMSZ mayor Zoltán Pék that led to a change of government in February 2010. The DS formed a new government in the municipality, and, in the shifting of personnel that followed, Zsíros Jankelić stood down as assembly president. She continued to serve in the local assembly.

=== Provincial representative and after ===
Serbia's electoral system was reformed in 2011, such that mandates in elections held under proportional representation were awarded in numerical order to candidates on successful lists. Zsíros Jankelić did not seek re-election at the republic level in 2012 but was instead elected for the Senta constituency seat in that year's provincial election in Vojvodina. The DS and its allies won the election, and she again served as supporter of the administration. She also appeared in the second position on the DS's list in the 2012 local elections and was re-elected when the list won ten mandates. During her term in the provincial assembly, Zsíros Jankelić served as vice-president of the Board of Directors of the Sports Federation of Vojvodina. In 2014, when there was a chance of the provincial government falling, she was a member of the DS's negotiating team with other parties to establish a new administration.

She attempted to return to the national assembly in the 2016 Serbian parliamentary election, appearing in the twenty-fourth position on the DS's list. The list won only sixteen mandates and she was not re-elected. She also led the DS's list in the concurrent local election in Senta and was elected when the list won five mandates. The VMSZ formed a coalition government with the Serbian Progressive Party (Srpska napredna stranka, SNS) after the election, and the DS served in opposition.

In 2020, Zsíros Jankelić made the somewhat unusual move from the DS to the VMSZ. This occurred against the backdrop of a DS election boycott. She was not given a strong position on the VMSZ's electoral list for Senta in the 2020 local elections, appearing in the seventeenth position, and she was not initially re-elected when the list won thirteen mandates. The VMSZ won the election and formed another coalition government with the SNS, however, and a number of party delegates resigned to take positions in government; Zsíros Jankelić was given a new mandate as a replacement member on 21 June 2020. She currently serves as a supporter of the local administration.

== Electoral record ==
=== Provincial (Vojvodina) ===
2012 Vojvodina assembly election Senta (constituency seat) - First and Second Rounds
Anikó Zsíros Jankelić	Choice for a Better Vojvodina–Bojan Pajtić (Affiliation: Democratic Party)	3,395	31.08	5,183	53.08
Attila Juhász	Alliance of Vojvodina Hungarians	3,675	33.64	4,581	46.92
József Sándor (incumbent)	Coalition: United Regions of Serbia–József Sándor	1,502	13.75		
Tatjana Radović	Socialist Party of Serbia (SPS)–Party of United Pensioners of Serbia (PUPS)–United Serbia (JS)–Social Democratic Party of Serbia (SDP Serbia)	762	6.98		
Tibor Kazinci	Hungarian Civic Alliance	670	6.13		
Karolj Čizik	Coalition: League of Social Democrats of Vojvodina–Nenad Čanak	427	3.91		
Tibor Menjhart	Hungarian Hope Movement	289	2.65		
Endre Tot	Serbian Radical Party	204	1.87		
Total valid votes		10,924	100	9,764	100
