= 2014 Serbian parliamentary election =

- 16 March 2014
- All 250 seats in the National Assembly; 126 seats needed for a majority
- Turnout: 53.09% (▼4.67pp)
Party	Leader	Vote %	Seats	+/–
SNS coalition	Aleksandar Vučić	49.96	158	+71
SPS–PUPS–JS	Ivica Dačić	13.94	44	0
DS coalition	Dragan Đilas	6.23	19	−32
NDS–ZS–LSV–ZZS	Boris Tadić	5.89	18	+12
Minority lists
VMSZ	István Pásztor	2.17	6	+1
SDAS	Sulejman Ugljanin	1.01	3	+1
PVD	Riza Halimi	0.70	2	+1
This lists parties that won seats. See the complete results below.
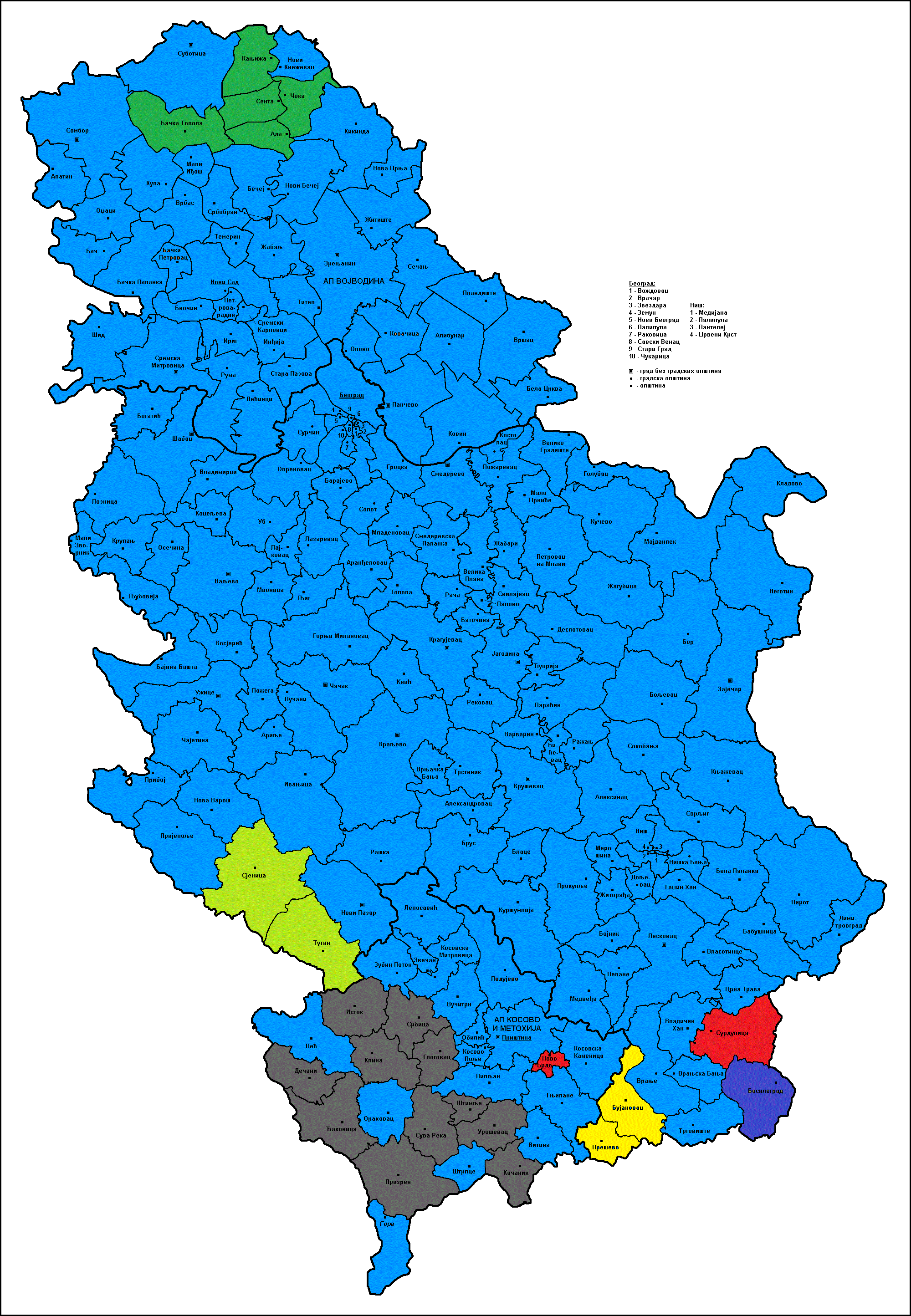
Election results by municipality
Prime Minister before	Prime Minister after
Ivica Dačić; SPS	Aleksandar Vučić; SNS

Parliamentary elections were held in Serbia on 16 March 2014, with nineteen electoral lists competing for 250 members of the National Assembly. The election was called early, after tensions in the coalition led by the ruling Serbian Progressive Party (SNS) and Socialist Party of Serbia (SPS). President of Serbia Tomislav Nikolić scheduled the election at the same time as the previously announced Belgrade City Assembly election. Voter turnout was 53.09%, with 3.22% of votes invalid.

The Serbian Progressive Party and their coalition won the election by a landslide, receiving just under half the valid votes and winning an absolute majority of 158 seats in the assembly. Its former partner the Socialist Party of Serbia matched its previous achievement with 44 seats, while only two more non-ethnic lists surpassed the 5% threshold: the Democratic Party (DS) with 19 seats, and the New Democratic Party coalition led by former president Boris Tadić with 18 seats. A number of long-time parliamentary parties, notably the Democratic Party of Serbia, United Regions of Serbia and the Liberal Democratic Party failed to cross the 5% threshold.

The election were the first since the 2000 elections, after the ousting of Slobodan Milošević's government, that a party won the absolute majority of seats. Aleksandar Vučić announced the formation of a new government with a coalition between the parties the Serbian Progressive Party ran with.

== Background ==
Following the last election, the coalition led by the Serbian Progressive Party (SNS) won a plurality. After two months of negotiations, the Serbian Progressive Party formed a coalition government with the Socialist Party of Serbia (SPS). Ivica Dačić (SPS) became prime minister, while Aleksandar Vučić (SNS) became first deputy prime minister. The former ruling party and now main opposition, Democratic Party (DS), suffered heavy losses in the election but retained a majority in Belgrade, a coveted position in Serbian politics. An internal split within the DS over leadership following the election further weakened its position with the mayor of Belgrade, Dragan Đilas (DS) losing a non-confidence vote.

With SNS ratings at an all-time high and growing tension within the ruling coalition, first deputy PM Aleksandar Vučić called for early parliamentary elections to be held. Some analysts believed that Vučić held the most influence in the government. Despite speculation that he would not, prime minister Ivica Dačić agreed to hold early parliamentary elections. On 29 January, President Tomislav Nikolić responded to the calls by dissolving parliament and scheduling early elections for 16 March 2014.

== Electoral system ==
The National Assembly of the Republic of Serbia is a unicameral parliament with 250 seats. The entire country is a single whole electoral unit, with all votes accumulated together and then MPs allocated in accordance to the D'Hondt method. The electoral threshold is set at 5%. However, electoral lists that are officially submitted as aiming to represent one of the country's registered national minorities have no barrage set. That means that, according to the valid electoral law, such a list needs to win 0.4% of the total votes in order to secure its 1st MP seat.

Despite the rejection of the Kosovan Albanians and in context of the Kosovo problem, voting was still organized on the territory of Kosovo, as per UNSCR 1244 (1999) and the Kumanovo Technical Agreement. Voting in Kosovo was handled, and not just seen, by the OSCE.

A total of 8,262 voting stations were prepared on Serbian territory (excluding Kosovo). On 1 March the RIK declared that in Serbia there was a total of 6,767,324 eligible voters, which was some twelve thousand less than in 2012. The RIK subsequently formed 90 voting stations for the disputed territory of Kosovo.

== Observers ==
The Center for Free Elections and Democracy was the only domestic observer. Among the international organizations that Serbia is a member of, neutral observers came from OSCE's Office for Democratic Institutions and Human Rights, the Parliamentary Assembly of the OSCE, the OSCE Mission in Serbia and the Parliamentary Assembly of the Council of Europe. The Commonwealth of Independent States, Albania and Russia sent observing missions from their domestic Commissions, and the American, British and Bulgarian embassies in Belgrade sent observing missions. The elections were also observed by the Common Network of International Observers from Japan.

== Electoral lists ==
The following are the official electoral lists published by the Republic Electoral Commission (RIK).

#	Ballot name	Ballot carrier	Main ideology	Political position	Note
1	Aleksandar Vučić – Future We Believe In; SNS, SDPS, NS, PS, SPO, DHSS, PSS—BK, NSS, USS	Aleksandar Vučić	Populism	Big tent	
2	"Ivica Dačić – SPS – PUPS – JS"; SPS, PUPS, JS	Ivica Dačić	Populism	Big tent	
3	Democratic Party of Serbia – Vojislav Koštunica; DSS	Vojislav Koštunica	National conservatism	Right-wing	
4	Čedomir Jovanović – LDP, BDZS, SDU; LDP, BDZS, SDU	Čedomir Jovanović	Liberalism	Centre	
5	Alliance of Vojvodina Hungarians – István Pásztor; SVM	Bálint Pásztor	Minority interests	Centre-right	^{M}
6	Serbian Radical Party – Dr Vojislav Šešelj; SRS, Obraz, SNP Naši	Vojislav Šešelj	Ultranationalism	Far-right	
7	United Regions of Serbia – Mlađan Dinkić; URS	Mlađan Dinkić	Liberal conservatism	Centre-right	
8	With the Democratic Party for a Democratic Serbia; DS, NOVA, DSHV, BS, USS Sloga	Dragan Đilas	Social democracy	Centre-left	
9	Dveri – Boško Obradović; Dveri	Boško Obradović	Christian right	Far-right	
10	Party of Democratic Action of Sandžak – Dr Sulejman Ugljanin; SDAS	Sulejman Ugljanin	Minority interests	Right-wing	^{M}
11	Boris Tadić – New Democratic Party – Greens, LSV – Nenad Čanak, ZZS, VMDK, ZZV, DLR; NDS–Z, LSV, ZZS, VMDK, ZZV, DLR	Boris Tadić	Social democracy	Centre-left	
12	Third Serbia – For All The Hard-Working People; TS	Aleksandar Protić	National conservatism	Right-wing	
13	Montenegrin Party – Josip Broz; CP, KP	Nenad Stevović	Minority interests		^{M}
14	All Together – BDZ – GSM – DZH – PMN – MEP – Emir Elfić; BDZ, GSM, DZH, PMN, MEP	Emir Elfić	Minority interests		^{M}
15	Enough is Enough – Saša Radulović; DJB	Saša Radulović	Social liberalism	Centre	
16	Coalition of Citizens of All Nations and National Communities (RDS–SDS); RDS, SDS	Miroslav Besermenji	Minority interests		^{M}
17	Civic Group "Patriotic Front" – Dr Borislav Pelević; SSJ, SSZ, NPPS, SPSS, URVIPPBS, PRG	Milica Đurđević	Ultranationalism	Far-right	
18	Russian Party – Slobodan Nikolić; RS	Slobodan Nikolić	National conservatism	Right-wing	^{M}
18	Party for Democratic Action – Riza Halimi; PDD	Riza Halimi	Minority interests	Centre-right	^{M}

^{M} — National minority list

== Candidates ==
=== SNS-led coalition ===
The Serbian Progressive Party renewed their coalition with Velimir Ilić's New Serbia and Aleksandar Vulin's Movement of Socialists from the 2012 election. The coalition was this time joined by Rasim Ljajić's Social Democratic Party (SDPS) and Vuk Drašković's monarchist Serbian Renewal Movement, the former previously running with the Democratic Party and the latter with the Liberal Democratic Party. In accordance with the coalition treaty, the SDPS was to receive at least 10 seats, New Serbia and the Serbian Renewal Movement each five, and Movement of Socialists three. The coalition took the name "Future We Believe In".

The Strength of Serbia Movement was a coalition partner in the previous election, but did not officially participate in 2014. Candidates from the party were still included in the coalition's lists. Both the Coalition of Refugee Associations in the Republic of Serbia and the People's Peasant Party were also not official coalition partners, but had candidates appear on lists. Of the several parties of national minorities that participated in the coalition in 2012, all broke off cooperation except for the Bosniak People's Party, whose candidates appeared on the list. SNS' list also contains former prominent Social Democrat Ljiljana Nestorović, and architect Branka Bošnjak (previously in the URS).

The Progressives' list was backed in union with SDPS and the Sandžak People's Party, which signed an agreement of endorsement. On 9 February, the Civic Initiative of Gora decided to support SNS, and the next day the Movement of Laborers and Peasants also announced their support. SNS also received endorsement from the Dinara-Drina-Danube Movement, the United Peasant Party, and the Roma Party. Through Rasim Ljajić's mediation, by March the Movement of Frontiersmen and the Diaspora agreed to endorse the electoral list.

=== Socialist Party of Serbia-lead coalition ===
The Socialist Party of Serbia (SPS) retained their coalition with United Serbia (JS) and the Party of United Pensioners of Serbia (PUPS). JS leader Dragan Marković announced that JS would ask for participation in the government rather than simply endorsing it like the two previous terms, asking for a minister's position for himself in the future government. The Socialist Party of Serbia did not include the Serbian Veteran Movement as it traditionally did, which broke off in late 2013 due to disagreement over policies regarding Kosovo.

=== Democratic Party of Serbia ===
The Democratic Party of Serbia (DSS) of ex-prime minister Vojislav Koštunica considered forming a Eurosceptic "Patriotic Bloc" with Dveri and possibly the Serbian Radical Party. DSS later stated that it chose not to form a coalition with other parties that expressed interest because it felt that those parties did not fully embrace DSS positions and that they merely wanted to join for the purpose of entering parliament. DSS officially submitted to the Republic Electoral Commission its candidate electoral list on 6 February.

DSS' list contained candidates from the Serbian Veteran Movement, a party that was originally SPS' coalition partner.

DSS' campaign slogan was I know who I believe — the Democratic Party of Serbia (Serbian Cyrillic: Знам коме верујем — Демократска странка Србије).

=== Liberal Democratic Party-led coalition ===
The Liberal Democratic Party (LDP) was originally invited to join Boris Tadić's Social Democratic Party in a coalition. After rejecting the offer, LDP attempted to arrange a coalition with the League of Social Democrats of Vojvodina, its partner in the 2007 elections, and after talks failed the Democratic Party. After those negotiations fell through, LDP formed its own coalition with the Bosniak Democratic Union of Sandžak and the Social Democratic Union. The Association of Free and Independent Trade Unions endorsed LDP.

=== Hungarian minority ===
The Alliance of Vojvodina Hungarians submitted its electoral list on 8 February, thus becoming the first national minority to do so. SVM leader István Pásztor announced the party's focus was secure the five seats won at the previous election.

=== Serbian Radical Party ===
SRS election poster

The ultra-nationalist Serbian Radical Party (SRS) was invited to become a part of a Eurosceptic by the Dveri movement and DSS, which it rejected. Instead, SRS ran on its own list, including candidates from the clerofascist "Srbski Obraz" Movement (which was officially banned by the constitutional court in 2012) and the far-right SNP Naši.

The coalition received an open letter of support from Russian National Bolshevik political scientist Aleksandr Dugin of the International Eurasian Movement.

This list' electoral slogan was: Both Kosovo and Russia (Serbian: И Косово и Русија, I Kosovo i Rusija), a satire of the "both Kosovo and the EU" doctrine.

=== Democratic Party ===
The Democratic Party (DS), led by Dragan Đilas, announced that it would join a coalition with New Party (Nova), the Democratic Alliance of Croats in Vojvodina (DSHV), the Serbian Trade Union Organization Sloga (USS), and Rich Serbia (BS).

As a response to the DLR's coalition with Tadić's New Democratic Party, DS announced the support of 20 Romani NGOs and cultural and public laborers.

=== New Democratic Party ===
After former president Boris Tadić broke from the Democratic Party, he announced the formation of the New Democratic Party. For the 2014 election, the party entered a coalition with LSV, ZZS, some Bosniak and Hungarian minority parties and the Greens.

In early February, the Greens of Serbia officially decided to elect Tadić as their leader and merge with NDS, becoming the "New Democratic Party - The Greens". NDS-Greens signed an official coalition treaty mid-February with Together for Serbia (ZZS) and the League of Social Democrats of Vojvodina (LSV); according to the treaty LSV would receive 6 MPs and ZZS 2, with the option for a 3rd MP for the latter should the common list win more than 10% votes.

=== Council of Serbian Unity-led Coalition ===
The Council of Serbian Unity announced the formation of the a coalition with various smaller parties:

- Serbian Council Oathkeepers
- National Movement Revival of Serbia
- Serbian Movement Free Serbia
- Society of War Veterans, Invalids and the Families of Fell Fighters of Serbia
- Ravna Gora Movement

=== Other candidacies ===
Third Serbia, a nationalist movement that broke off from Dveri after the previous elections, announced that it would run in the election.

== Opinion polls ==
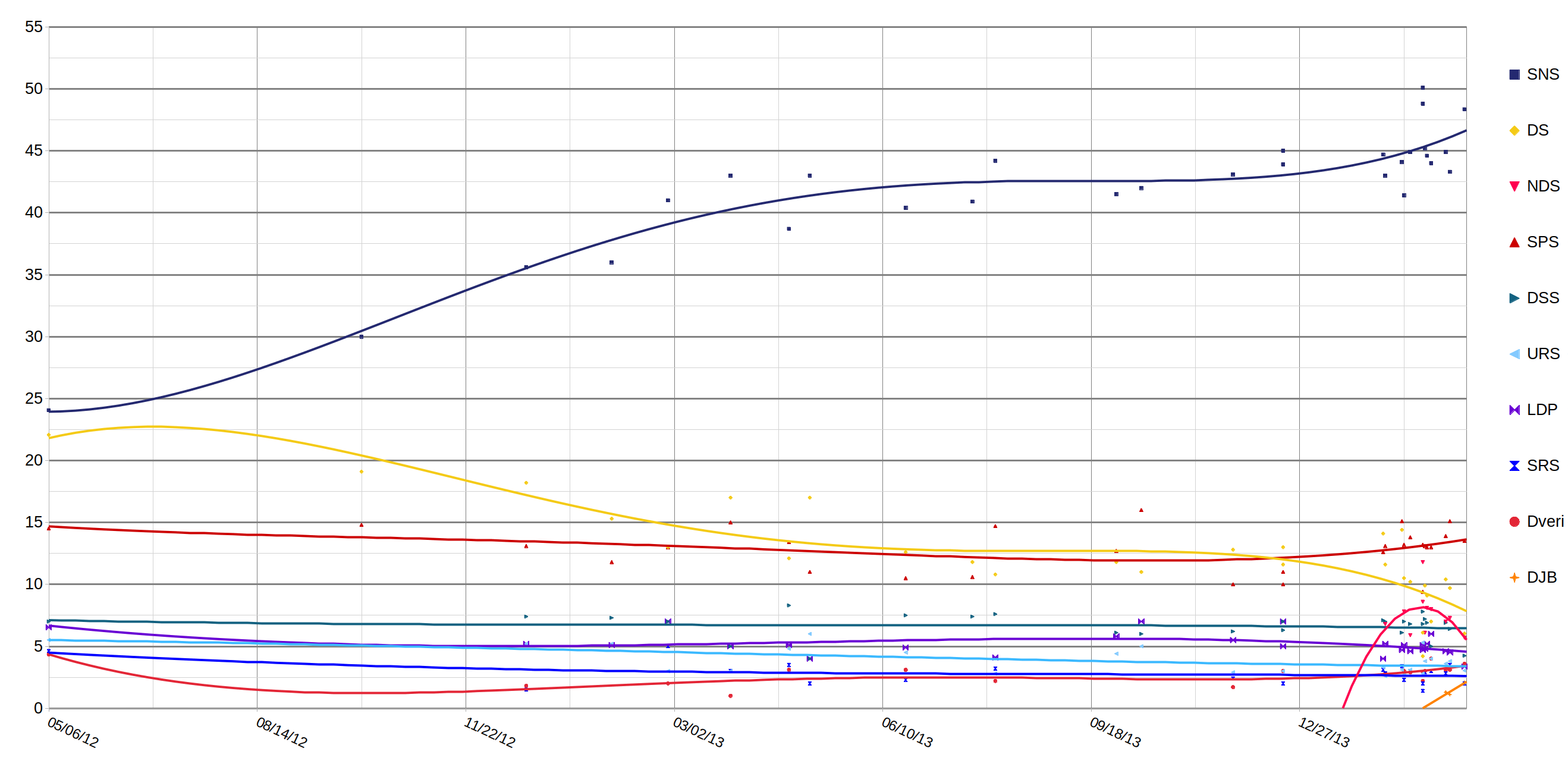

== Results ==
Preliminary results showed the Progressive-led coalition winning with 158 seats, while the SPS–PUPS–JS coalition came second with 44, the Democratic-led coalition third with 19 and Boris Tadić's coalition with 18.

Of the minorities, the SVM qualified with six seats, SDA with three seats and the Albanian minority list Party for Democratic Action with 2 seats.

Party	Votes	%	Seats	+/–
Future We Believe In (SNS–SDPS–NS–SPO–PS) (Note: Of the 158 seats won by the alliance, the Serbian Progressive Party won 128, the Social Democratic Party of Serbia 10, New Serbia 6, the Serbian Renewal Movement 5, the Movement of Socialists 3, the Strength of Serbia Movement 2, the Christian Democratic Party 1, the People's Peasant Party 1, the United Peasant Party 1 and the Bosniak People's Party 1.)	1,736,920	49.96	158	+71
SPS–PUPS–JS (Note: Of the 44 seats won by the alliance, the Socialist Party won 25, the Party of United Pensioners 12 and United Serbia 7.)	484,607	13.94	44	0
For a Democratic Serbia (DS–Nova–DSHV–BS) (Note: Of the 19 seats won by the alliance, the Democratic Party won 17 and the New Party 2.)	216,634	6.23	19	–32
NDS–Z–LSV–ZZS–ZZV (Note: Of the 18 seats won by the alliance, the Social Democratic Party and Greens won 10, the League of Social Democrats of Vojvodina 6 and Together for Serbia 2.)	204,767	5.89	18	+12
Democratic Party of Serbia	152,436	4.38	0	–21
Dveri	128,458	3.69	0	0
LDP–BDZS–SDU	120,879	3.48	0	–15
United Regions of Serbia	109,167	3.14	0	–16
Alliance of Vojvodina Hungarians	75,294	2.17	6	+1
Enough is Enough	74,973	2.16	0	New
Serbian Radical Party	72,303	2.08	0	0
Party of Democratic Action of Sandžak	35,157	1.01	3	+1
Party for Democratic Action	24,301	0.70	2	+1
Third Serbia	16,206	0.47	0	New
Russian Party	6,547	0.19	0	New
Montenegrin Party–Communist Party	6,388	0.18	0	0
Patriotic Front	4,514	0.13	0	New
All Together	3,983	0.11	0	–1
RDS–SDS	3,182	0.09	0	New
Total	3,476,716	100.00	250	0
Valid votes	3,476,716	96.78		
Invalid/blank votes	115,659	3.22		
Total votes	3,592,375	100.00		
Registered voters/turnout	6,765,998	53.09		
Source: RIK

== Government formation ==
Although SNS alone had the required minimum of 126 seats, it maintained its pre-electoral coalition with SDPS, NS and SPO-DHSS, along with all of the lesser partners such as PS. Dačić noted that there were no discussions of government formation, but that SPS-PUPS-JS was ready to continue on where it left off. Đilas noted that the Democrats excluded any possibility of coalition and that they would have talks merely with President Nikolić, rejecting his call. While all of the three (Hungarian, Bosniak and Albanian) minority parties noted that they would enter the government, Ljajić explicitly noted that SDPS would not be a part of the future ruling coalition if SDA joined it. Tadić considered the Socialists responsible for bad policy so his coalition would not join with the Progressives' if a coalition with the SPS was restored.
