= József Tóbiás (Vojvodina politician) =

Serbian-Hungarian politician

- Јожеф Тобиаш

Member of the National Assembly of the Republic of Serbia
- Incumbent
- Assumed office 6 February 2024

Member of the Assembly of Vojvodina for Ada
- In office 16 July 2008 – 2 June 2016
- Preceded by: József Micsíz
- Succeeded by: position eliminated

Personal details
- Born: 31 August 1971 (age 55) Senta, SAP Vojvodina, SR Serbia, SFR Yugoslavia
- Party: DS (until 2016); VMSZ (since 2018)

József Tóbiás (Note: Serbian Cyrillic: Јожеф Тобиаш, romanized: Jožef Tobiaš) (born 31 August 1971) is a Serbian politician from the country's Hungarian community. He served in the Assembly of Vojvodina from 2008 to 2016, has been the president (i.e., speaker) of the Ada municipal assembly since 2020, and has served in the National Assembly of Serbia since February 2024. Previously with the Democratic Party (DS), Tóbiás has been a member of the Alliance of Vojvodina Hungarians (VMSZ) since 2018.

== Early life and private career ==
Tóbiás was born in Senta, in what was then the Socialist Autonomous Province of Vojvodina in the Socialist Republic of Serbia, Socialist Federal Republic of Yugoslavia. He is an entrepreneur, working in a business that has been overseen by his family for three generations. He received a certificate in handball coaching in 2011 and has received awards from the Vojvodina Handball Association and the Hungarian Handball Association.

== Politician ==
=== Democratic Party ===
Tóbiás was elected to the Vojvodina assembly in the 2008 provincial election, winning the Ada constituency seat in the second round of voting. The Democratic Party and its allies won a majority government, and he served as a supporter of the provincial administration. He was re-elected in the 2012 provincial election, in which the DS and its allies fell narrowly below a majority and afterward formed a coalition government with other parties. In his second term, he was a member of agriculture committee and the committee for national equality. He was not a candidate in the 2016 provincial election.

Tóbiás also appeared in the second position on the DS's electoral list for Ada in the 2008 Serbian local elections and was given a mandate when the party won a plurality victory with ten out of twenty-nine seats. Zoltán Bilicki of the Democratic Party served afterward as mayor in a coalition administration. Tóbiás later received the fourth position on the DS list in the 2012 local elections and was re-elected when the list won a majority victory with sixteen mandates. Bilicki continued to serve as mayor.

In early 2016, Bilicki left the Democratic Party and founded his own citizens' group in Ada, which won a majority victory in that year's local elections. Tóbiás did not seek re-election to the assembly but was appointed to the municipal council (i.e., the executive branch of the local government) when Bilicki's third administration was established in June 2016.

Bilicki joined the Serbian Progressive Party (SNS) in late 2016. Tóbiás did not follow him but instead joined the VMSZ two years later.

=== Alliance of Vojvodina Hungarians ===
Tóbiás joined the VMSZ in 2018 and became president of its municipal board in Ada. He continued serving on the municipal council for the next two years.

In the 2020 local elections, Tóbiás led the VMSZ's list in Ada and was re-elected to the local assembly when the list won eleven seats. Bilicki was confirmed for another term as mayor after the election, and Tóbiás was chosen as president of the assembly. He continues to serve in this role as of 2024.

He also appeared in the 189th position on the VMSZ's electoral list in the 2020 Serbian parliamentary election. Election from this position was not a realistic prospect, and he was not elected when the list won nine seats.

In the 2023 parliamentary election, Tóbiás was given the fourth position on the VMSZ's list and was elected when the list won six seats. He took his seat when the assembly convened in February 2024. He is now the deputy chair of the agriculture committee (Note: Formally known as the Agriculture, Forestry, and Water Management Committee.) and a deputy member of the finance committee (Note: Formally known as the Committee on Finance, State Budget, and Control of Public Spending.) and the committee on human and minority rights and general equality.

Tóbiás was elected as chair of the VMSZ's council in March 2024. He is now leading the VMSZ's list for Ada in the 2024 Serbian local elections.

== Electoral record ==
=== Provincial (Vojvodina) ===
2012 Vojvodina provincial election: Ada
Candidate	Party	First round		Second round	
Candidate	Party	Votes	%	Votes	%
József Tóbiás (incumbent)	"Choice for a Better Vojvodina–Bojan Pajtic" (Affiliation: Democratic Party)	3,816	42.75	6,144	78.92
Ferenc Ürményi	United Regions of Serbia–Ferenc Ürményi	1,452	16.27	1,641	21.08
Ferenc Illés	Alliance of Vojvodina Hungarians–Pásztor István	1,366	15.30		
Stevan Morović	Let's Get Vojvodina Moving–Tomislav Nikolić: Serbian Progressive Party, New Serbia, Movement of Socialists, Strength of Serbia Movement (Affiliation: Serbian Progressive Party)	644	7.21		
Áron Csonka	Democratic Fellowship of Vojvodina Hungarians	638	7.15		
Jószef Bernát	Ivica Dačić–Socialist Party of Serbia (SPS), Party of United Pensioners of Serbia (PUPS), United Serbia (JS), Social Democratic Party of Serbia (SDP Serbia)	436	4.88		
Rudolf Krizsán	League of Social Democrats of Vojvodina–Nenad Čanak	423	4.74		
Attila Sipos	Hungarian Hope Movement	151	1.69		
Total		8,926	100.00	7,785	100.00

2008 Vojvodina provincial election: Ada
Candidate	Party	First round		Second round	
Candidate	Party	Votes	%	Votes	%
József Tóbiás	Democratic Party	2,990	29.63	3,396	55.31
Dr. Elvira Tóth Barna	Hungarian Coalition–Pásztor István (Affiliation: Alliance of Vojvodina Hungarians)	3,017	29.90	2,744	44.69
József Micsíz Attila (incumbent)	G17 Plus	2,644	26.20		
Dragan Bajšanski	Serbian Radical Party	799	7.92		
Angéla Andankó	Together for Vojvodina–Nenad Čanak	641	6.35		
Total		10,091	100.00	6,140	100.00
Valid votes		10,091	97.76	6,140	97.12
Invalid/blank votes		231	2.24	182	2.88
Total votes		10,322	100.00	6,322	100.00
