= Coalition for Peace and Tolerance =

Political coalition in Serbia

Coalition for Peace and Tolerance Коалиција за мир и толеранцију Koalicija za mir i toleranciju
- Abbreviation: KZMT
- President: Jahja Fehratović
- Founded: 26 April 2023
- Ideology: Minority interests; Regionalism
- National Assembly: 0 / 250

The Coalition for Peace and Tolerance (Serbian: Коалиција за мир и толеранцију, romanised: Koalicija za mir i toleranciju, abbr. KZMT) is a political coalition in Serbia, consisting of political parties that advocate minority interests. Formed in April 2023, KZMT participated in the 2023 Serbian parliamentary election under the name "Together for the Future and Development – Coalition for Peace and Tolerance", with Jahja Fehratović of For the Future and Development as its main representative. It failed to cross the threshold.

== History ==
=== Formation ===
A group of political parties and organisations that advocate minority interests, which included Democratic Party of Macedonians (DPM), Vlach National Party (VNS), Hungarian Civic Alliance (MPSZ), Tolerance of Serbia (TS), Bosniak Civic Party (BGS), Party of Montenegrins (SCG), and Vojvodina Movement (VP), held a meeting in Pančevo on 26 April 2023. The parties and organisations formed the Coalition for Peace and Tolerance (KZMT) and announced that they would take part in the upcoming provincial, local, and parliamentary elections. KZMT held its first press conference on 15 May at the Association of Journalists of Serbia, also with the presence of the "We Need You" association. At the press conference, they revealed "we are building the future together" (budućnost gradimo zajedno!) as its slogan.

=== 2023 elections ===
Following the formation of KZMT, Jahja Fehratović also left the Justice and Reconciliation Party (SPP). Fehratović accused SPP of being subdued to "personal interests, populism, and small and mundane actions". Fehratović continued to serve in the National Assembly of Serbia as an independent member. Later in October, Fehratović announced the formation of the For the Future and Development (ZZBR). He said that his party would be based on the principles of traditional values, spirituality, and rule of law, and that it would include the founders of the SPP, a party he co-founded with Muamer Zukorlić.

Parliamentary and local elections were called on 1 November and the provincial election was called on 16 November, setting 17 December 2023 as the date for the elections. KZMT subsequently announced that it would contest the parliamentary and local elections with Fehratović's ZZBR under the name "Together for the Future and Development – Coalition for Peace and Tolerance". Besides ZZBR, the signatories of the 10 November coalition agreement included VNS, MPSZ, TS, BGS, SC, VP, Democratic Union of Croats, Civic Party of Greeks of Serbia, Union of Yugoslavs, Union of Female Roma Network and Non-Roma Network of Serbia, and Union of Banat Romanians. Fehratović was also named as its main representative and as its ballot holder for the parliamentary election.

KZMT's electoral list was initially declined on 18 November by the Republic Electoral Commission (RIK). KZMT collected 6,093 signatures of support in total but RIK confirmed that only 4,937 collected signatures are valid. On the same day, KZMT collected 436 more valid signatures and RIK confirmed its electoral list and gave it the status of a minority list due to all parties that compose the election being registered ethnic minority parties. The KZMT electoral list contains 60 candidates. KZMT's electoral list for local elections in Novi Pazar was confirmed on 23 November. Writer Zehnija Bulić was announced as its ballot holder for the local election in Novi Pazar. KZMT failed to cross the threshold for the parliamentary election.

== Ideology and platform ==
In a report after its formation, KZMT said that "our name [...] clearly defines us as a political option that fights against conflict, hatred, intolerance, divisions and quarrels". KZMT also presented its "three points" which includes the "Scandinavianisation of the Balkans, democratisation of the political system, and the protection and promotion of the rights of national minorities". KZMT defined its ideology as pacifist, pragmatic, humanist, tolerant, and solidary. KZMT supports the accession of Serbia to the European Union, cooperation with NATO, and opposes sanctions on Russia.

== Members ==
=== Current composition ===
Name	Leader	Main ideology	National Assembly
For the Future and Development (ZZBR)	Jahja Fehratović	Bosniak minority interests	0 / 250
Vlach National Party (PNR/VNS)	Predrag Balašević	Vlach minority interests	0 / 250
Hungarian Civic Alliance (MPSZ/GSM)	László Rác Szabó	Hungarian minority interests	0 / 250
Democratic Union of Croats (DZH)	Marinko Prćić	Croat minority interests	0 / 250
Tolerance of Serbia (TS)	Jasminko Hadžisalihović	Secular humanism	0 / 250
Bosniak Civic Party (BGS)	Jasminko Hadžisalihović	Bosniak minority interests	0 / 250
Party of Montenegrins (SCG)	Marijana Ivović Vukotić	Montenegrin minority interests	0 / 250
Vojvodina Movement (VP)	Robert Karan	Vojvodina autonomism	0 / 250
Civic Party of Greeks of Serbia (PKTTS/GSGS)	Vassilios Proveleggios	Greek minority interests	0 / 250
Union of Yugoslavs (SJ)	Goran Miladinović	Yugoslav minority interests	0 / 250
Union of Female Roma Network and Non-Roma Network of Serbia (UŽRNMS)	Rukija Bektešević	Roma minority interests	0 / 250
Union of Banat Romanians (UBR)	Aleksandar Balan	Romanian minority interests	0 / 250

=== Former members ===
Name	Leader	Main ideology
Democratic Party of Macedonians (DPM)	Maja Georgievska	Macedonian minority interests
We Need You (TNT)	Ljubomir Zrnić	Anti-corruption

== Electoral performance ==
=== Parliamentary elections ===
National Assembly
Year	Leader		Popular vote	% of popular vote	#	# of seats	Seat change	Status	Ref.
Year	Name	Party	Popular vote	% of popular vote	#	# of seats	Seat change	Status	Ref.
2023	Jahja Fehratović	ZZBR	6,786	0.18%	▲16th	0 / 250	▼1	Extra-parliamentary	
2026	Ferid Bulić	ZZBR	1,187	0.03%	▼18th	0 / 250	0	Extra-parliamentary	
