= Milan Višnjić =

Serbian academic and politician

Milan Višnjić (Serbian Cyrillic: Милан Вишњић; born 6 April 1950) is a medical doctor, academic, administrator, and politician in Serbia. Between 2000 and 2004, he was a member of the parliaments of the Federal Republic of Yugoslavia (FRY) and Serbia and Montenegro, serving as a member of the Democratic Party (Demokratska stranka, DS). He later left the DS and became a prominent figure in the Reformist Party (Reformistička stranka, RS), which was founded and for many years led by his son, Aleksandar Višnjić.

== Early life and academic career ==
Višnjić was born in the village of Kupinovo in the municipality of Kuršumlija, in what was then the People's Republic of Serbia in the Federal People's Republic of Yugoslavia. He graduated from the University of Niš Faculty of Medicine in 1973, completed training as a specialist in plastic and reconstructive surgery at the Military Medical Academy in Belgrade (1982), and trained in general surgery in Niš. He earned his Ph.D. in 1986, became a teacher at the University of Niš in 1989 (focusing on war surgery), and was promoted to full professor in 2001. He has published widely in his field. Višnjić was the dean of the medical faculty from 2000 to 2012, at which point he was reassigned as the department's vice-dean for finance.

=== Arrest and acquittal ===
Višnjić was arrested in July 2013 on suspicion of abuse of office at the University of Niš. Shortly thereafter, he was removed from office as vice-dean. He retired from the university in 2015.

In June 2018, Višnjić was acquitted of all charges. After the decision, he argued that the charges against him were politically motivated and had been made in retaliation for his own accusations of improper spending against other university officials. The Court of Appeals affirmed the verdict of acquittal in 2020.

== Politician ==
=== Early years (1992–2000) ===
Višnjić first ran for the FRY assembly's Chamber of Citizens in the December 1992 Yugoslavian parliamentary election as a candidate of the Democratic Movement of Serbia (Demokratski pokret Srbije, DEPOS) coalition in the Niš constituency. He appeared in the sixth position on the coalition's electoral list; the list won two seats in the division, and he was not given a mandate when the assembly met in January 1993. (At the time, one-third of the mandates in Yugoslavian assembly elections were awarded to candidates on successful lists in numerical order, with the remaining two-thirds assigned to candidates at the discretion of the sponsoring parties or coalitions. Višnjić could have been granted a mandate despite his list position, though he was not.)

The DEPOS coalition subsequently split, and Višnjić ran on the Democratic Party of Serbia (Demokratska stranka Srbije, DSS) list for Niš in the 1993 Serbian parliamentary election. The list did not win any seats in the division.

Višnjić was elected to the City Assembly of Niš in the 1996 Serbian local elections as a candidate of the Zajedno (English: "Together") coalition, a group of parties opposed to Slobodan Milošević's administration. Zajedno won a majority victory in Niš; state authorities initially refused to recognize the result but finally did so in the course of the 1996-1997 protests in Serbia. Višnjić supported the local administration in the term that followed and, by this time, was a member of the DS.

=== Federal parliamentarian (2000–04) ===
The DS contested the 2000 Yugoslavian parliamentary election as part of the Democratic Opposition of Serbia (Demokratska opozicija Srbije, DOS), a broad and ideologically diverse coalition of parties opposed to the Milošević administration. Višnjić was given the second position on the DOS list for the Chamber of Citizens in the Prokuplje division and received an automatic mandate when the list won four out of ten available seats. (By this time, half of the mandates in federal elections were assigned in numerical order. There was initially some controversy with the vote count in Prokuplje and a neighbouring division, but Višnjić was awarded a seat in November 2000 after the results were finalized). Slobodan Milošević was defeated in the concurrent Yugoslavian presidential election, an event that precipitated significant changes in Serbian and Yugoslavian politics. The DOS won a plurality victory overall in the parliamentary election and was able to form a coalition government with the Socialist People's Party of Montenegro; Višnjić served as a supporter of the administration.

He was also re-elected to the Niš assembly as a DOS candidate in the 2000 Serbian local elections, as the various DOS parties collectively won a landslide majority in the city.

In early 2003, the Federal Republic of Yugoslavia was reconstituted as the State Union of Serbia and Montenegro, and a unicameral legislature was created as the new country's parliament. The first members of this assembly were chosen by indirect election by the Serbian and Montenegrin republican parliaments; only members of those republican legislatures and of the previous federal assembly were eligible to serve. Višnjić was selected as one of the DS members of the new federal parliament on 25 February.

Višnjić subsequently received the 149th position on the DS's list in the 2003 Serbian parliamentary election, which was held in December. (Since 2000, the entire country has been counted as a single electoral division. From 2000 to 2011, all mandates were assigned to candidates on successful lists at the discretion of sponsoring parties or coalitions, irrespective of numerical order.) The DS list won thirty-seven seats and served in opposition in the parliament that followed. Višnjić was not given a seat in the republican parliament and, in February 2004, was not selected by the DS for a new term in the federal assembly.

He subsequently left the DS amid differences with its Niš leadership. In August 2004, he joined a breakaway group called "Pure Democracy," which comprised former DS members from the right wing of the party. He was the group's list bearer for the 2004 Serbian local elections in Niš at the municipal level and possibly at the city level as well; the list did not win any mandates.

In December 2004, Višnjić was nominated by the mayor of Niš, Smiljko Kostić, to serve on city council (i.e., the executive branch of the city government). His nomination was defeated in the city assembly, largely due to the opposition of the DS.

=== Since 2004 ===
Višnjić later joined the Reformist Party. He was the party's list bearer in the 2012 Serbian parliamentary election and also led the party's list for the Niš city assembly in the concurrent 2012 local election. The party did not cross the electoral threshold at either level.

In the 2016 local elections, Višnjić was the list bearer for a coalition of the Reformists and Together for Serbia (Zajedno za Srbiju, ZZS) in Niš and appeared in the second position. Once again, the list did not cross the threshold to win representation in the assembly.
