= 2012 Vojvodina provincial election =

Serbian election

2012 Vojvodina provincial elections
← 2008	6 and 20 May 2012	2016 →
- All 120 seats in the Assembly of Vojvodina; 61 seats needed for a majority
Party	Leader	Vote %	Seats	+/–
DS coalition	Bojan Pajtić	22.05	58	−6
SNS coalition	Tomislav Nikolić	19.26	22	New
SPS–PUPS–JS–SDPS	Ivica Dačić	11.84	13	+8
LSV	Nenad Čanak	11.58	10	+4
VMSZ	István Pásztor	6.47	7	−2
SRS	Vojislav Šešelj	6.63	5	−19
DSS	Vojislav Koštunica	6.23	4	−2
LDP coalition	Čedomir Jovanović	5.01	1	0
This lists parties that won seats. See the complete results below.
President of the Government before	President of the Government after
Bojan Pajtić; DS	Bojan Pajtić; DS

Provincial elections were held in Vojvodina in May 2012. The first round was held on 6 May, while the second round was held on 20 May.

== Lists which participated in the elections ==
1. Choice for a Better Vojvodina - Dr Bojan Pajtić (Izbor za bolju Vojvodinu - Dr Bojan Pajtić), a coalition led by the Democratic Party
2. League of Social Democrats of Vojvodina - Nenad Čanak (Liga Socijaldemokrata Vojvodine - Nenad Čanak)
3. United Regions of Serbia - Mlađan Dinkić (Ujedinjeni regioni Srbije - Mlađan Dinkić)
4. Serbian Radical Party - Dr Vojislav Šešelj (Srpska Radikalna Stranka - Dr Vojislav Šešelj)
5. Let's Get Vojvodina Moving - Tomislav Nikolić (Pokrenimo Vojvodinu - Tomislav Nikolić), a coalition led by the Serbian Progressive Party
6. Democratic Party of Serbia - Vojislav Koštunica (Demokratska Stranka Srbije - Vojislav Koštunica)
7. Čedomir Jovanović - Vojvodinian U-Turn (Čedomir Jovanović - Vojvođanski Preokret)
8. Ivica Dačić - SPS - PUPS - JS - SDPS, a coalition of Socialist Party of Serbia, Party of United Pensioners of Serbia, United Serbia and Socialdemocratic Party of Serbia
9. Alliance of Vojvodina Hungarians - István Pásztor (Savez Vojvođanskih Mađara - István Pásztor
10. Dveri for Serbian Vojvodina (Dveri za Srpsku Vojvodinu)
11. All Together: BDZ, GSM, DZH, DZVM, Slovak Party - László Rác Szabó (Sve Zajedno: BDZ, GSM, DZH, DZVM, Slovačka Stranka - Laslo Rac Sabo), a coalition of Bosniak Democratic Union, Civil Alliance of Hungarians, Democratic Union of Croats, Democratic Fellowship of Vojvodina Hungarians and Slovak Party
12. Movement of Hungarian Hope - Balint Laslo (Pokret Mađarske Nade - Balint Laslo)
13. Montenegrin Party - Nenad Stevović (Crnogorska Partija - Nenad Stevović)
14. Serb Democratic Party - Dragan Dašić (Srpska Demokratska Stranka - Dragan Dašić)

== Results ==
Party	Proportional			Constituency			Total seats
Party	Votes	%	Seats	Votes	%	Seats	Total seats
Choice for a Better Vojvodina	212,189	22.05	16			42	58
Let's Get Vojvodina Moving	185,311	19.26	14			8	22
SPS–PUPS–JS–SDPS	113,910	11.84	9			4	13
League of Social Democrats of Vojvodina	111,397	11.58	8			2	10
Serbian Radical Party	63,748	6.63	5			0	5
Alliance of Vojvodina Hungarians	62,275	6.47	4			3	7
Democratic Party of Serbia	59,931	6.23	4			0	4
Vojvodinian U-Turn	48,208	5.01	0			1	1
Dveri for Serbian Vojvodina	46,169	4.80	0			0	0
United Regions of Serbia	38,965	4.05	0			0	0
Serb Democratic Party	6,559	0.68	0			0	0
Hungarian Hope Movement	5,991	0.62	0			0	0
All Together	4,842	0.50	0			0	0
Montenegrin Party	2,635	0.27	0			0	0
Total	962,130	100.00	60			60	120
Valid votes	962,130	95.30					
Invalid/blank votes	47,471	4.70					
Total votes	1,009,601	100.00					
Registered voters/turnout	1,735,616	58.17					
Source: PIK
