= HHM =

HHM may refer to:

- Hamelin station, Lower Saxony, Germany
- Hungarian Hope Movement
- Hamlin, Hamlin & McGill, a fictional law firm in the TV series Better Call Saul
