= Jahja Fehratović =

Serbian politician

- Јахја Фехратовић

Member of the National Assembly of the Republic of Serbia
- In office 3 June 2016 – 6 February 2024

Leader of the Bosniak Democratic Union of Sandžak
- In office 2013–2017

Personal details
- Born: 29 March 1982 (age 44) Novi Pazar, SR Serbia, SFR Yugoslavia
- Party: BDZ (until 2013); BDZ Sandžak (2013–2017); SPP (2017–2023); SBR (2023)
- Occupation: Politician

Jahja Fehratović (Serbian Cyrillic: Јахја Фехратовић; born 29 March 1982) is a Serbian politician and academic. He is a prominent figure in the country's Bosniak community.

Fehratović was the leader of the Bosniak Democratic Union of Sandžak (BDZ Sandžak) from the party's formation in 2013 until December 2017, when it was reconstituted as the Justice and Reconciliation Party (SPP) under the leadership of Chief Mufti Muamer Zukorlić. He was a vice-president of the SPP from 2017 to 2023, when he left the party. Fehratović served in the National Assembly of Serbia from 2016 to 2024 and has been a member of the Bosniak National Council.

== Early life and academic career ==
Fehratović was born in Novi Pazar, in the Sandžak region of what was then the Socialist Republic of Serbia in the Socialist Federal Republic of Yugoslavia. He attended elementary and secondary school in the city, earned a bachelor's degree in Bosnian literature and the Bosnian language at the University of Sarajevo in Bosnia and Herzegovina (2007), and later received a master's degree (2012) and a Ph.D. (2013) from Zukorlić's International University of Novi Pazar. His master's thesis was on the poetics and politics of revolutionary poetry, and his Ph.D. was on the literary-historical and poetic characteristics of Sandžačkobošnjačke literature. He began working at the International University of Novi Pazar's department of philology in 2009, is a published poet and novelist, and is an active publisher of historical Bosniak literature.

== Politician ==
Fehratović was a leading member of the Bosniak Democratic Union (BDZ) in the early 2010s.

In 2010, Serbia organized its first direct elections for the country's national minority councils. The electoral list of Zukorlić's Bosniak Cultural Community group won seventeen seats in the election for the Bosniak National Council, as against thirteen for the Bosniak List led by Sulejman Ugljanin and five for the Bosniak Renaissance list of Rasim Ljajić. The results were extremely contentious, and the legitimacy of the Bosniak Cultural Community's victory was contested by both the Serbian government and Ugljanin's party. Zukorlić's group held a constituent session for the council on 7 July 2010, which was also attended by two delegates from Bosniak Renaissance. This iteration of the council continued to meet afterward but was not recognized by the Serbian government. Fehratović, who had not been a candidate in the 2010 election, was appointed as chair of the breakaway council's language and letters committee in December 2010. Later in the same month, he was chosen as president of the Bosniak Cultural Community.

Zukorlić ran for president of Serbia as an independent candidate in the 2012 presidential election, and Fehratović ran his campaign headquarters. The following year, the BDZ split into two rival factions, respectively led by Zukorlić and party leader Emir Elfić. The pro-Zukorlić wing of the party held a convention in early 2013 that deposed Elfić and elected Fehratović in his place. Elfić rejected the convention as illegitimate, describing it as constituting an act of "aggression" against the BDZ. These events ultimately led to party split, and in late 2013 Zukorlić's supporters coalesced as the BDZ Sandžak with Fehratović as party leader.

The Serbian government held a new election for the Bosniak National Council in 2014. Fehratović appeared in the lead position on Zukorlić's For Bosniaks, Sandžak and the Mufti list; the only other list to appear on the ballot was Ugljanin's For Bosniak Unity. Ugljanin's list won the election, nineteen seats to sixteen. Fehratović charged electoral fraud, saying that all of the overseers for a special second ballot in Tutin had been members of Ugljanin's Party of Democratic Action of Sandžak (SDA). Ultimately, however, he accepted his list's defeat and agreed to serve in opposition.

Fehratović condemned the physical threats made against Serbian prime minister Aleksandar Vučić at a 2015 commemoration for the victims of the Srebrenica massacre and said that those who threatened Vučić did a disservice to the Bosniak community. In making this statement, he urged a full and lasting reconciliation between Serbs and Bosniaks.

=== Parliamentarian ===
After participating in multi-party alliances for the previous two Serbian elections, the BDZ Sandžak ran its own list in the 2016 Serbian parliamentary election. Fehratović appeared in the second position, after Zukorlić, and both men were elected when the list won two mandates. Fehratović also appeared in the second position on the party's list for the Novi Pazar city assembly in the concurrent 2016 Serbian local elections and was elected when the list won ten mandates, finishing third against Ljajić's Sandžak Democratic Party (SDP) and the SDA.

The SPP gave outside support to Serbia's coalition government led by the Serbian Progressive Party (SNS) in the 2016–20 parliament. Fehratović did not have any committee assignments in this sitting of the assembly, although he was a member of parliamentary friendship groups with Austria, Montenegro, North Macedonia, Russia, and Switzerland. As religious fundamentalists opposed to the public recognition of LGBT rights, Zukorlić and Fehratović absented themselves from the assembly during the confirmation vote for the openly lesbian Ana Brnabić to become Serbia's prime minister in June 2017.

Fehratović appeared in the second position on Zukorlić's list in the 2018 elections for the Bosniak National Council and was re-elected when the list won thirteen mandates. Ugljanin's list once again narrowly defeated Zukorlić's, while a list affiliated with Ljajić finished third. After the election, the parties of Ugljanin and Ljajić formed a coalition administration while Zukorlić's followers remained in opposition.

The SPP won four seats in the 2020 Serbian parliamentary election against the backdrop of a boycott by several opposition parties. Fehratović, who appeared in the fourth position on the party's list, was elected to a second term. He was also re-elected to the Novi Pazar city assembly in the 2020 Serbian local elections, although he resigned his seat in the local assembly on 21 December 2020. In the 2020–22 parliament, Fehratović was a deputy member of the education committee, (Note: Formally known as the Committee on the Education, Science, Technological Development, and the Information Society.) a deputy member of Serbia's delegation to the parliamentary assembly of the Organization for Security and Co-operation in Europe (OSCE PA), and a member of the friendship groups with Australia, Azerbaijan, Bosnia and Herzegovina, Germany, Lebanon, Luxembourg, Montenegro, Morocco, Russia, Spain, Sweden, Switzerland, Turkey, and the United States of America. Muamer Zukorlić died in November 2021 and was replaced as SPP leader by his son Usame Zukorlić.

Fehratović received the second position on the SPP's list in the 2022 parliamentary election and was re-elected when the list won three seats. In the parliament that followed, he was for a time the leader of a parliamentary group comprising the SPP, the United Peasant Party (USS), and the Democratic Alliance of Croats in Vojvodina (DSHV). He was promoted to deputy chair of the education committee and led a subcommittee on science and higher education, as well as being a deputy member of the culture and information committee and the committee on the rights of the child, the leader of Serbia's parliamentary friendship group with Algeria, and a member of the friendship groups with Albania, Austria, Azerbaijan, Bosnia and Herzegovina, Germany, Morocco, North Macedonia, Norway, Sweden, Tunisia, Türkiye, and the United States of America.

He was not a candidate in the 2022 election for the Bosniak National Council.

Fehratović resigned from the SPP on 4 May 2023, charging that the party had abandoned its founding principles in favour of trivial short-term politics a based on a reactive populism. He said that he would continue to work in service of Muamer Zukorlić's ideals as an independent member of the assembly.

In October 2023, Fehratović announced that he was founding a new political group called the Party of the Future and Development (Stranka budućnosti i razvoja, SBR). He contested the 2023 Serbian parliamentary election at the held of the multi-party Coalition for Peace and Tolerance list; as his own party was not registered, his endorsement formally came from the Bosniak Civic Party. The list did not receive enough votes to win any mandates. Fehratović also appeared in the largely symbolic twenty-sixth and final position on the Coalition for Peace and Tolerance's list in Novi Pazar in the 2023 Serbian local elections. This was too low a position for election to be a realistic prospect, and the list did not cross the electoral threshold in any event.

In September 2026, Ferhatović was selected as a candidate on the electoral list of the ruling SNS and its United Serbia coalition for the upcoming parliamentary election, alongside fellow Bosniak politician Samir Tandir.
