= Vladimir Cvijan =

Serbian lawyer and politician

Vladimir Cvijan Владимир Цвијан
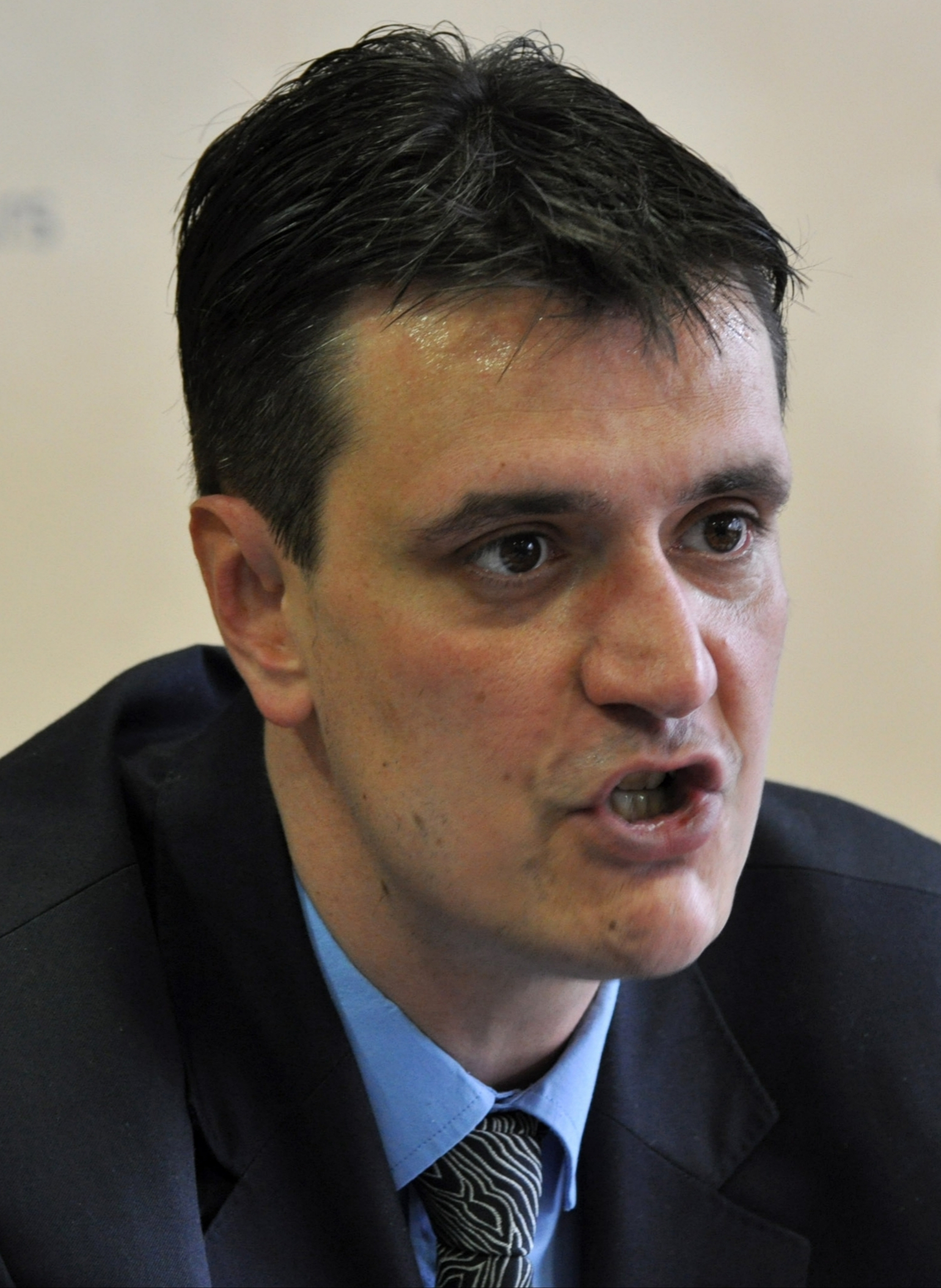
- Cvijan in 2014

Member of the National Assembly
- In office 31 May 2012 – 16 April 2014
- President: Nebojša Stefanović

General Secretary of President of Serbia
- In office February 2008 – 23 March 2010
- President: Boris Tadić

Personal details
- Born: 24 November 1976 Belgrade, SR Serbia, SFR Yugoslavia
- Died: 5 January 2018 (aged 41) Belgrade, Serbia (Note: According to Belgrade Higher Public Prosecutor Office in March 2021.)
- Cause of death: Drowning
- Party: Serbian Progressive Party (2010–2014); Independent (2004–2010, 2014)
- Spouse: Aleksandra Cvijan (divorced)
- Education: University of Belgrade (LL.M)
- Occupation: Lawyer, politician

Vladimir Cvijan (Serbian Cyrillic: Владимир Цвијан; 24 November 1976 – 5 January 2018) was a Serbian lawyer and politician. From 2004 until 2010, he served as the legal advisor and General Secretary to President of Serbia Boris Tadić. After joining then opposition Serbian Progressive Party (SNS), he became a member of the party presidency and one of the most prominent members. From 2012 until 2014, he served as the SNS member of the National Assembly. Cvijan was later an independent representative in the parliament and an active dissident for a short period until his unnoticed disappearance in 2014.

In 2014, Cvijan abruptly disappeared from public life. He died by drowning in the Danube on 5 January 2018 in Belgrade, Serbia, according to the Belgrade Higher Public Prosecutor Office in March 2021. Before that, there was no single trace of his fate, except for some tabloid claims that he allegedly fled the country to the United States in 2017. His death was kept hidden from the public for three years, until it was revealed by the media in March 2021. The circumstances and reasons why his death was hidden from the public for so long are still unknown.

== Biography ==
=== Education and law career ===
Cvijan was born on 24 November 1976 in Belgrade. His father, Mirko, has heritage from Bosnia and Herzegovina but was born in Peć and was a biology professor and Dean of the Faculty of Biology of the University of Belgrade, while his mother Zlatinka is from Kikinda. In 1999 he graduated from the University of Belgrade's Faculty of Law as the best student of his generation. In 2004, he obtained LL.M. in the field of Protection of Intellectual Property Rights and Internet Law at the Faculty of Law in Belgrade.

He worked in the Institute for Comparative Law from 2000 to 2004.

He was the target of public criticism as the legal representative of Sreten Jocić, better known as Joca Amsterdam, in the trial for the murder of the Croatian journalist Ivo Pukanić. He later withdrew from representing Jocić under public pressure. Cvijan was also the lawyer of Ivan Pavlović Iker, accused of cocaine smuggling.

=== Administration and political career ===
From October 2004, he was engaged as a consultant for expert analysis in the field of law for the needs of the cabinet of President Boris Tadić and as the secretary of the Legal Council of the President of Serbia. In February 2008, after Tadić was re-elected president, he was appointed adviser and served as the general secretary of the presidency.

He left the staff of the Presidency in March 2010, according to him, due to disagreements over the re-election of judges, and joined the emerging Serbian Progressive Party (SNS) the following month. The vice president of the SNS, Aleksandar Vučić, presented Cvijan as one of the best lawyers in Serbia, the creator of 70 legal proposals, and one of the most recognized legal experts in Europe. Cvijan was elected Member of the National Assembly following the 2012 Serbian parliamentary election won by the SNS-led coalition, and was considered a very serious candidate for Minister of Justice. During his time as MP, Cvijan served as the President of the Legislative Committee of the National Assembly. In late 2013, he began to oppose the policies of the then Deputy Prime Minister Aleksandar Vučić and accused Vučić of abusing the constitution and laws, and setting up scandals for his political opponents. He later filed a criminal complaint against Vučić. On 9 December 2013, Cvijan also announced his intention to run for the presidency of SNS. On 18 December 2013 at a meeting of the SNS presidency, Vučić allegedly physically attacked Cvijan. On 30 December 2013, Cvijan left the SNS and resigned from all party functions. He continued to act as an independent MP until his term ended with the calling of a snap election in May 2014. In January 2014, he joined the minor opposition Reformist Party becoming its president, announcing its rebranding as the anti-corruption Republican Party. Shortly after, he disappeared from public life.

=== Disappearance and death ===
In February 2021, Srđan Milivojević of the opposition Democratic Party, gave an interview stating that Cvijan could be one of the victims of Veljko Belivuk's criminal organization, which was accused of abductions and murders of several people in Serbia and Montenegro. In March 2021 another article in Tabloid Magazine revealed that they had discovered that Cvijan had been dead since early 2018. On 15 March 2021, journalist Predrag Popović of Tabloid Magazine published a document in which the Public Prosecutor of the Higher Public Prosecutors Office in Belgrade stated that the Prosecutor's Office had issued an order ordering the payment of costs to the Institute for Forensic Medicine of the Belgrade University for the autopsy of Cvijan's body on 20 November 2018. On the same day, the Bar Association of Serbia announced that Cvijan had been removed from the register of active lawyers, "due to his death". President of the Bar, Viktor Gostiljac told the media that this was done after learning that Cvijan had died, but he could not specify when that had occurred. According to the President of the Bar Association of Belgrade, Jugoslav Tintor, Cvijan was removed from the active lawyer registry on 17 August 2018, after discovery that he had died on 5 January 2018, according to the death registry. The same day, the Higher Public Prosecutors Office revealed that Cvijan had drowned in the Danube river in Belgrade on 5 January 2018.

The circumstances of his death, as well as the reason why it was kept hidden from the public for more than 3 years, are still unclear, with some calling his death "mysterious". Cvijan's ex-wife and son were also unaware that he was dead and did not know where he might have been buried. On 23 March 2021, it was revealed that Cvijan was cremated and buried on 19 January 2018 at the Lešće cemetery, and the urn with his remains is only identified by his first name. The same day, the pro-regime newspaper Srpski Telegraf published the alleged autopsy results of Cvijan's body from 2018 which stated that the death occurred due to drowning and that alcohol was found in Cvijan's body.

None of the officials and membership of the ruling SNS, in which Cvijan was a high-ranking official and a candidate for party leader in 2013, a few months before his disappearance, have commented on the case until, two weeks after the public discovery of Cvijan's death, long-term leader of the party and current President of Serbia Aleksandar Vučić gave a statement saying that Cvijan was not murdered. Opposition activist, former head of the Military Security Agency, founding member and MP of the ruling SNS, Momir Stojanović, stated on 17 March 2021, that Cvijan knew a lot about the activities of the SNS-led government and that he most likely "suffered" because of that knowledge. According to Croatian journalist Domagoj Margetić, Cvijan was murdered because he had compromising information about the government and its connections to the organized crime, and that Cvijan had left him a number of compromising documents.

== Personal life ==
Besides his native Serbian, Cvijan spoke English and Russian. He was divorced and had one child.

== Works ==
- (2007) Pregled zakonodavstva sistema odbrane Republike Srbije (transl. Overview of Defence Legislation in Serbia)

Co-authorship:

- (2002) Istraživački projekat Zakonodavstvo o prosvetnom savetu : (uporednopravna istraživanja)(transl. Research project Legislation on the Education Council: (Comparative Legal Research))
- (2003) Pravosudni saveti (transl. Judicial Advice)
- (2004) Građansko pravo (transl. Civil Law)
- (2004) Građansko pravo Intelektualna svojina harmonizacija domaćeg zakonodavstva sa pravom Evropske unije (transl. Civil Law Intellectual Property Harmonization of Domestic Legislation with the Law of the European Union)
- (2008) Prava pripadnika sistema odbrane (transl. Rights of Members of the Defense System)

== See also ==
- Assassination of Oliver Ivanović (January 2018)
- Disappearance and death of Ivan Stambolić
- Lists of solved missing person cases
- List of unsolved deaths
- SNS-related allegations of crime and corruption
