= József Micsíz =

Serbian-Hungarian politician

József Micsíz (Note: Serbian Cyrillic: Јожеф Мичиз, romanized: Jožef Mičiz) (born 17 March 1958) is a Serbian politician from the country's Hungarian national minority community. He represented Ada in the Assembly of Vojvodina from 2004 to 2008. Elected as the candidate of a local citizens' group, he later served with G17 Plus.

== Private career ==
Micsíz is a graduated mechanical engineer from Ada. He is a longtime owner and director of the metal industry company Termometal.

== Politician ==
An independent political movement called With Knowledge and Heart for a Successful Municipality won a plurality victory in Ada in the 2004 Serbian local elections, taking eleven out of twenty-nine seats in the local assembly. The movement's leader Ferenc Ürményi became mayor and formed a coalition government with other independent groups and with G17 Plus. Micsíz was elected to the local assembly as one of the movement's candidates. He was also elected to the provincial assembly under the movement's banner in the concurrent 2004 Vojvodina provincial election.

Micsíz chaired Ada's sports and technical committee in the 2004–08 term and was appointed to its security council in 2007. While he was not endorsed by G17 Plus in the 2004 provincial election, he later joined the party's assembly group and became its deputy leader. He served on the Vojvodina assembly's economy committee and the committee for European integration and international regional cooperation.

Micsíz was defeated in his bid for re-election in the 2008 provincial election, finishing third in Ada as a G17 Plus candidate. He also appeared in the second position on a combined list of G17 Plus and Ürményi's movement in the 2008 local elections; the list fell to six seats, and he did not take a mandate afterward in the local assembly.

== Electoral record ==
=== Provincial (Vojvodina) ===
2008 Vojvodina provincial election: Ada
Candidate	Party	First round		Second round	
Candidate	Party	Votes	%	Votes	%
József Tóbiás	Democratic Party	2,990	29.63	3,396	55.31
Dr. Elvira Tóth Barna	Hungarian Coalition–Pásztor István (Affiliation: Alliance of Vojvodina Hungarians)	3,017	29.90	2,744	44.69
József Micsíz Attila (incumbent)	G17 Plus	2,644	26.20		
Dragan Bajšanski	Serbian Radical Party	799	7.92		
Angéla Andankó	Together for Vojvodina–Nenad Čanak	641	6.35		
Total		10,091	100.00	6,140	100.00
Valid votes		10,091	97.76	6,140	97.12
Invalid/blank votes		231	2.24	182	2.88
Total votes		10,322	100.00	6,322	100.00

2004 Vojvodina provincial election: Ada
Candidate	Party	First round		Second round	
Candidate	Party	Votes	%	Votes	%
József Micsíz	Citizens' Group: With Knowledge and Heart for a Successful Municipality–Ürményi Ferenc Feco	3,494	47.66	4,039	65.41
Sándor Bakos	Alliance of Vojvodina Hungarians	892	12.17	2,136	34.59
Zoltán Palatinus	Coalition: Together for Vojvodina–Nenad Čanak	860	11.73		
Áron Csonka	Democratic Fellowship of Vojvodina Hungarians	840	11.46		
István Zolcer	Democratic Party (Demokratska partija)	554	7.56		
Valerija Stražmešterov	Serbian Radical Party	364	4.97		
István Sterbik	G17 Plus	327	4.46		
Total		7,331	100.00	6,175	100.00
Valid votes		7,331	96.42	6,175	97.49
Invalid/blank votes		272	3.58	159	2.51
Total votes		7,603	100.00	6,334	100.00
