= 2012 Serbian parliamentary election =

- 6 May 2012
- All 250 seats in the National Assembly; 126 seats needed for a majority
- Turnout: 57.76% (▼3.57pp)
Party	Leader	Vote %	Seats	+/–
SNS coalition	Tomislav Nikolić	25.16	73	+43
IZBŽ	Boris Tadić	23.09	67	−3
SPS–PUPS–JS	Ivica Dačić	15.18	44	+24
DSS	Vojislav Koštunica	7.32	21	0
Preokret	Čedomir Jovanović	6.83	19	+2
URS	Mlađan Dinkić	5.77	16	−8
Minority lists
VMSZ	István Pásztor	1.83	5	+1
SDAS	Sulejman Ugljanin	0.74	2	+1
SZ	Emir Elfić	0.67	1	+1
NOPO	Nikola Tulimirović	0.61	1	New
KSLP	Riza Halimi	0.36	1	0
This lists parties that won seats. See the complete results below.
Results by municipality
PS IZBŽ SPS–PUPS–JS DSS URS VMSZ SDAS KSLP
Prime Minister before	Prime Minister after
Mirko Cvetković; Independent	Ivica Dačić; SPS

Parliamentary elections were held in Serbia on 6 May 2012 to elect members of the National Assembly. The elections were held simultaneously with provincial, local, and presidential elections.

== Background ==
The 2008 parliamentary elections resulted in the formation of a new pro-European government on 7 July 2008, with the necessary parliamentary votes coming from President Boris Tadić's For a European Serbia list, and the coalition of the Socialist Party of Serbia, the Party of United Pensioners of Serbia and United Serbia (the SPS-PUPS-JS coalition), plus six out of the seven minorities representatives. The new government elected Mirko Cvetković (endorsed by the Democratic Party) as Prime Minister.

The opposition, the Serbian Radical Party (SRS), had a split after the elections. The Serbian Progressive Party (SNS) party broke off and is headed by Tomislav Nikolić and Aleksandar Vučić, both of whom were major figures in the SRS before the establishment of the SNS in late 2008. In most opinion polls they and Democratic Party (DS) remain the two most popular parties, in combination gaining at least 60 percent of the total vote when combined. Other parties remain far behind, struggling to even attain double digit popularity figures.

In early 2011, according to the Democratic Party's strategic marketing polls, the opposition SNS had higher ratings than the next three most popular parties combined. The opposition attempted to promote early elections to take place in 2011. Major opposition rallies in February 2011 focused on the cited difficult socioeconomic conditions as well as widespread corruption. The protesters' goal was to hold the elections earlier, in the Fall of 2011. The protests did not succeed in affecting the date of the elections, which are to be held on 6 May 2012. At least 50,000 to 70,000 attended the peaceful protests held on streets of Belgrade organised by SNS, the strongest among the country's opposition bloc.

In fall 2011, posters and billboards endorsing various parties peppered Belgrade. The election campaigns of many parties were well under way, despite the election date having been set for the first half of 2012.

== Electoral lists ==
There were 18 registered electoral lists for the 2012 parliamentary elections:

#	Ballot name	Ballot carrier	Main ideology	Political position	Note
1	Choice for a Better Life – Boris Tadić; DS, SDPS, LSV, ZS, DSHV, DHSS	Dragan Đilas	Social liberalism	Centre to centre-left	
2	Serbian Radical Party – Dr Vojislav Šešelj; SRS	Vojislav Šešelj	Ultranationalism	Far-right	
3	United Regions of Serbia – Mlađan Dinkić; G17+, ZZŠ, NS	Mlađan Dinkić	Liberal conservatism	Centre-right	
4	Čedomir Jovanović – Preokret; LDP, SPO, SDU, BS, VP, BDSS, ZEP, SBS, ASNS	Čedomir Jovanović	Liberalism	Centre	
5	Let's Get Serbia Moving – Tomislav Nikolić; SNS, NS, PS, PSS–BK, NSS, BNS, DPM, RP, APPS, KUIRS, PVJ, EOS	Tomislav Nikolić	Populism	Big tent	
6	Democratic Party of Serbia – Vojislav Koštunica; DSS	Vojislav Koštunica	National conservatism	Right-wing	
7	Ivica Dačić – Socialist Party of Serbia – Party of United Pensioners of Serbia – United Serbia; SPS, PUPS, JS, PSV	Ivica Dačić	Populism	Big tent	
8	Dveri – For the life of Serbia; Dveri	Branimir Nešić	Christian right	Far-right	
9	Alliance of Vojvodina Hungarians – István Pásztor; VMSZ/SVM	Bálint Pásztor	Minority politics	Centre-right	^{M}
10	Reformist Party – prof dr Milan Višnjić; RS	Aleksandar Višnjić	Reformism	Centre	
11	Party of Democratic Action of Sandžak – dr Sulejman Ugljanin; SDAS	Ifeta Radončić	Minority politics	Right-wing	^{M}
12	Movement of Workers and Peasants; PRS	Zoran Dragišić	Labourism	Left-wing	
13	Social Democratic Alliance – Nebojša Leković; SDS	Nebojša Leković	Social democracy	Centre-left	
14	All Together: BDZ, GSM, DZH, DZVM, Slovak Party – Emir Elfić; BDZ, DZH, VMDK/DZVM, GSM, SP	Emir Elfić	Minority politics		^{M}
15	Albanian Coalition of Preševo Valley; PVD/PDD	Riza Halimi	Minority politics		^{M}
16	Montenegrin Party – Nenad Stevović; CP	Nenad Stevović	Minority politics		^{M}
17	Communist Party – Josip Broz; KP	Joška Broz	Titoism	Far-left	
18	None of the Above; NOPO	Nikola Tulimirović	Direct democracy	Centre	

^{M} — national minority list - the minimum threshold for these lists is 0.4% of the vote, compared to 5% for the others.

== Conduct ==
The Center for Free Elections and Democracy (CeSID) was amongst the electoral observers. CeSID was also an election monitor.

== Results ==
About 6.7 million people were eligible to vote in the elections. The OSCE undertook the organisation of voting for the roughly 109,000 Serb voters in Kosovo. Voting stations were open from 7:00 to 20:00 with no incidents reported across the country. Voter turnout by 18:00 was 46.34% in Belgrade, 48.37% in central Serbia and 47.89% in Vojvodina. Voter turnout in Kosovo was 32%.

Party	Votes	%	Seats	+/–
Let's Get Serbia Moving (Note: List included Serbian Progressive Party (58 seats), New Serbia (8), Strength of Serbia Movement (2), Movement of Socialists (1), People's Peasant Party (1), Bosniak People's Party, (1), Roma Party (1) and the Democratic Party of Macedonians (1))	940,659	25.16	73	+43
Choice for a Better Life (Note: List included Democratic Party (49 seats), Social Democratic Party of Serbia (9), League of Social Democrats of Vojvodina (3), Christian Democratic Party of Serbia (1), Greens of Serbia (1) and the Democratic Alliance of Croats in Vojvodina (1))	863,294	23.09	67	–3
SPS coalition (Note: List included Socialist Party of Serbia (25 seats), Party of United Pensioners of Serbia (12) and United Serbia (7))	567,689	15.18	44	+24
Democratic Party of Serbia	273,532	7.32	21	0
Preokret (Note: List included Liberal Democratic Party (13 seats), Serbian Renewal Movement (4), Social Democratic Union (1) and Rich Serbia (1))	255,546	6.83	19	+2
United Regions of Serbia	215,666	5.77	16	–8
Serbian Radical Party	180,558	4.83	0	–77
Dveri for the Life of Serbia	169,590	4.54	0	New
Alliance of Vojvodina Hungarians	68,323	1.83	5	+1
Movement of Workers and Peasants	57,199	1.53	0	New
Communist Party	28,977	0.77	0	New
Party of Democratic Action of Sandžak	27,708	0.74	2	+1
All Together (Note: Seat taken by the Bosniak Democratic Union)	24,993	0.67	1	+1
None of the Above	22,905	0.61	1	New
Social Democratic Alliance	16,572	0.44	0	New
Albanian Coalition of Preševo Valley (Note: Seat taken by the Party for Democratic Action)	13,384	0.36	1	0
Reformist Party	8,867	0.24	0	0
Montenegrin Party	3,855	0.10	0	0
Total	3,739,317	100.00	250	0
Valid votes	3,739,317	95.63		
Invalid/blank votes	170,995	4.37		
Total votes	3,910,312	100.00		
Registered voters/turnout	6,770,013	57.76		
Source: Republican Electoral Commission

== Involvement of the United States ==
In April 2012, Rudy Giuliani lobbied for Aleksandar Vučić in his candidacy for mayor of Belgrade. The US Embassy to Serbia released a statement saying that Giuliani's appearance did not represent the United States endorsing any candidate in Serbia's parliamentary upcoming election. Dragan Đilas, the incumbent mayor, responded to Giuliani's appearance, saying "Giuliani should not speak about Belgrade's future as a man who supported the bombing of Serbia."

On 3 July 2012, the United States' Deputy Assistant Secretary of State, Philip Reeker, conducted undisclosed discussions with Mlađan Dinkić of the URS party in his first day there. When a journalist from B92 asked him what his mission in Serbia was, he replied that he was visiting "because Belgrade is a beautiful city". Subsequently, URS joined the ruling coalition in the Serbian parliament. At the time, Blic published a series of stories from anonymous diplomatic sources, correctly predicting a coalition with URS and SNS, asserting that Reeker's meetings in Belgrade were intended to ensure that the new ruling coalition involve parties which guarantee the continuation of the Belgrade–Pristina negotiations. Additionally, Blic reported that Vučić was against SPS members leading both the BIA and the Ministry of Internal Affairs, and asserted that the United States was in agreement with Vučić in disapproval of SPS controlling both state agencies.
