= Dániel Gyivánovity =

Serbian politician

- Gyivánovity Dániel

President of the City Assembly of Subotica
- Incumbent
- Assumed office 10 July 2024
- Preceded by: Bálint Pásztor

Member of the National Assembly of the Republic of Serbia
- In office 1 December 2020 – 1 August 2022

Personal details
- Born: 3 January 1979 (age 46); Subotica, SAP Vojvodina, SR Serbia, SFR Yugoslavia
- Political party: VMSZ

Dániel Gyivánovity (Serbian Cyrillic: Даниел Ђивановић, romanized: Daniel Đivanović; born 3 October 1979) is a Serbian politician from the country's Hungarian community. He served in the Serbian parliament from 2020 to 2022 and has been the president (i.e., speaker) of the Subotica city assembly since July 2024. Gyivánovity is a member of the Alliance of Vojvodina Hungarians (VMSZ).

== Early life and career ==
Gyivánovity was born in Subotica, in what was then the Socialist Autonomous Province of Vojvodina in the Socialist Republic of Serbia, Socialist Federal Republic of Yugoslavia. He holds a Bachelor of Science degree from the Belgrade Business School's College of Professional Studies (2009) and a separate Bachelor of Science degree in management from Union University in Belgrade (2014). He worked for Interšped in Subotica (1999–2004) and Mercedes-Benz Novi Sad (2004–13) and was later a director for Grand Motors (2014–20) and D-Motors Group in Subotica (2020–22). His hobbies include vintage cars.

== Politician ==
Gyivánovity was given the eleventh position on the VMSZ's electoral list in the 2020 Serbian parliamentary election. The party won a record nine seats in this election; Gyivánovity was not immediately elected but received an assembly mandate on 1 December 2020 as the replacement for another member. During his assembly term, he was a member of the judiciary committee, (Note: Formally known as the Committee on the Judiciary, Public Administration, and Local Self-Government.) a deputy member of the spatial planning committee, (Note: Formally known as the Committee on Spatial Planning, Transport, Infrastructure, and Telecommunications.) and a member of the parliamentary friendship groups with France and the Holy See. The VMSZ provided outside support to Serbia's government led by the Serbian Progressive Party (SNS) in this period.

He was promoted to the eighth position on the VMSZ's list in the 2022 parliamentary election. The party fell back to five seats, and he was not re-elected. He was appointed as a state secretary in ministry of public investments after the election and served in this role until 2024.

Gyivánovity received the eleventh position on the VMSZ's list in the 2023 parliamentary election and was again not elected when the list won six seats. He later appeared in the second position on the party's list for the Subotica city assembly in the 2024 Serbian local elections and was elected when the list won nineteen seats, finishing second against the alliance around the Progressive Party. The SNS and VMSZ formed a coalition government after the election, and Gyivánovity was elected as the city assembly president on 10 July 2024.
