= All Together (Serbia) =

All Together (Serbian: Sve Zajedno / Све Заједно) was a political coalition that participated in 2012 Serbian parliamentary election. The coalition is composed by five political parties:

- Bosniak Democratic Union
- Hungarian Civic Alliance
- Democratic Union of Croats
- Hungarian Hope Movement
- Hungarian Unity Party (Magyar Egység Párt - MEP)

They were the 14th announced electoral list and had Emir Elfić as their ballot carrier. They received a total of 24,993 votes getting them their first and only seat, which was taken by the Bosniak Democratic Union.
