= Reformist Party (Serbia) =

Reformist Party Реформистичка странка Reformistička stranka
- Abbreviation: RS
- Founder: Aleksandar Višnjić
- Founded: 11 April 2005; 21 years ago (first); 2019; 7 years ago (second)
- Dissolved: 2 March 2018; 8 years ago (first); 1 August 2023; 2 years ago (second)
- Split from: Democratic Party (first); Conservative Reformist Party (second)
- Succeeded by: Conservative Reformist Party (first); New Face of Serbia (second)
- Headquarters: Niš

Website
- reforme.rs

The Reformist Party (Serbian: Реформистичка странка, romanized: Reformistička stranka, RS), also known as the Reformists (Реформисти / Reformisti) was a minor Niš-based regionalist political party in Serbia. It was founded and led by Aleksandar Višnjić, political activist, former member of Otpor! and Democratic Party (DS) and professor at Faculty of Medicine of the University of Niš.

== History ==
The Reformists took part in the 2007 parliamentary election as an independent list and won no seats finishing the last with only 0.05 percent of vote or 1,881 votes. It is one of four parties that won less than 10,000 votes even though they had to submit exactly the same number of signatures in order to be able to run in the elections. It also had a candidate for the 2008 presidential election, its vice-president Jugoslav Dobričanin. The Reformist Party ran again in 2008 and 2012 Serbian parliamentary elections, but was below the threshold both times.

=== Post-2014 developments ===
In January 2014, former high-ranked member and MP of the ruling Serbian Progressive Party, Vladimir Cvijan joined the Reformist Party becoming its president, announcing its renaming and rebranding as the new anti-corruption and pro-democracy Republican Party, while the founder and former president Višnjić agreed to be vice-president of the reformed political party. The Republican Party would later become a registered minority party led by controversial businessman Nikola Sandulović.

Following Cvijan's disappearance from public life, the Reformist Party continued to exist until 2018, when it was merged with an association to create the Conservative Reformist Party (KRST). Dejan Đorđević was elected as the new leader, however, after a financial controversy he was deposed a year later and the party was again renamed to the Reformist Party. In 2021, the Reformist Party presented pulmonologist and conspiracy theorist Branimir Nestorović and former MP Miladin Ševarlić as their candidates for the 2022 Serbian general elections, however, the Reformist Party did not manage to collect enough signatures and it ultimately did not participate in the elections. Following the 2022 elections, Miloš Parandilović, a former Movement for the Restoration of the Kingdom of Serbia member, formed the New Face of Serbia association. The Reformist Party was then re-registered as the New Face of Serbia, thus Parandilović skipped collecting 10,000 signatures that are needed for the registration of a political party.
