= Bálint Pásztor =

Serbian politician (born 1979)

- Балинт Пастор
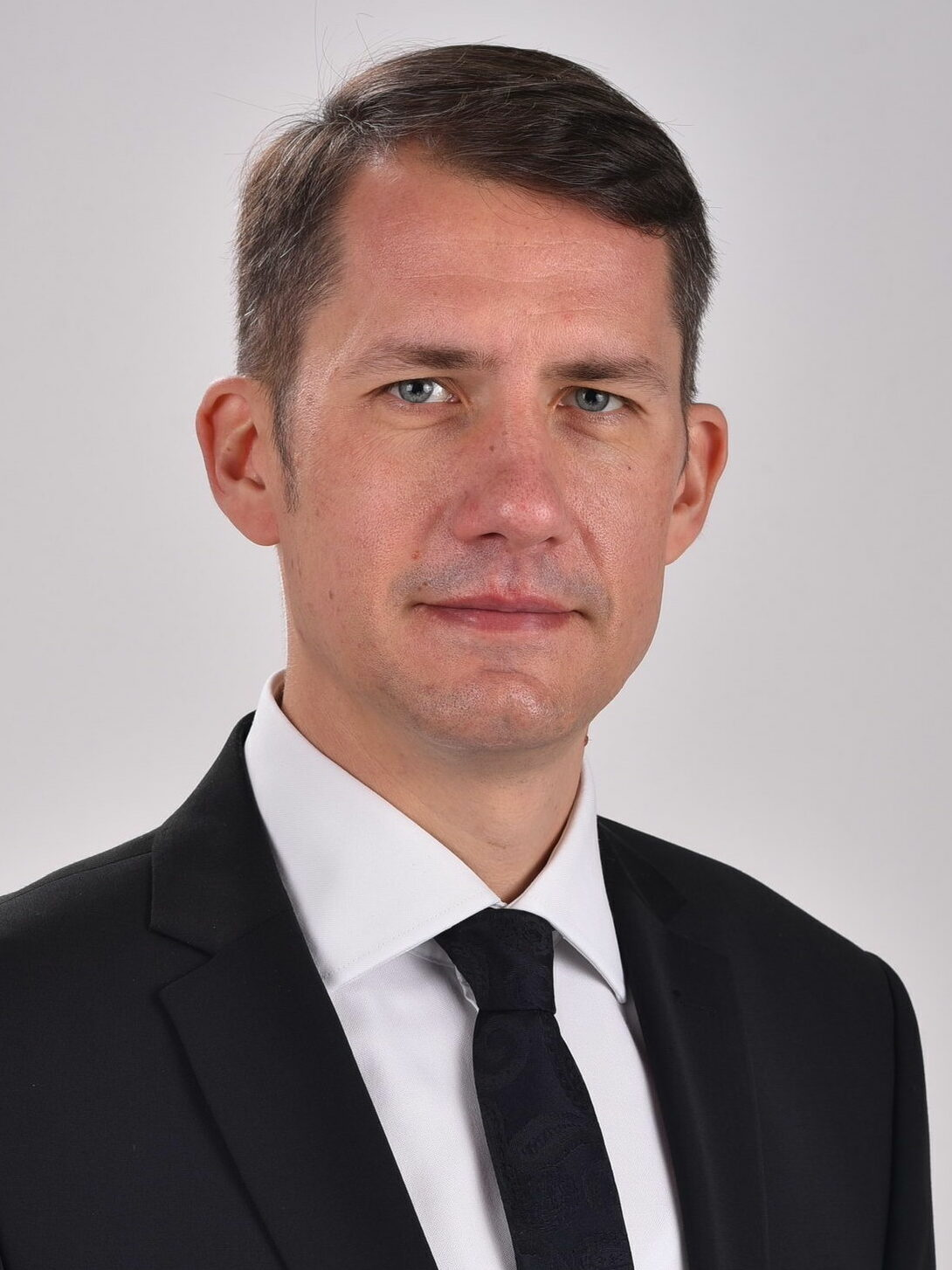
- Pásztor in 2023

Leader of the Alliance of Vojvodina Hungarians
- Incumbent
- Assumed office 31 October 2023 (acting leader until 2 March 2024)
- Preceded by: István Pásztor

Member of the National Assembly
- Incumbent
- Assumed office 14 February 2007

President of the City Assembly of Subotica
- In office 21 August 2020 – 10 July 2024
- Deputy: Nebojša Crnogorac
- Preceded by: Tivadar Bunford
- Succeeded by: Dániel Gyivánovity

Personal details
- Born: 3 January 1979 (age 47) Subotica, Vojvodina, SR Serbia, SFR Yugoslavia
- Party: VMSZ
- Parent: István Pásztor
- Education: University of Belgrade
- Website: www.pasztorbalint.rs/sr

Bálint Pásztor (Serbian: Балинт Пастор, Balint Pastor; born 3 January 1979) is a Serbian politician. An ethnic Hungarian, he has led the Alliance of Vojvodina Hungarians (VMSZ) since October 2023, initially on an acting basis and since March 2024 as the party's elected president. Pásztor has served in the Serbian parliament since 2007 and was also the president (i.e., speaker) of the Subotica city assembly from 2020 to 2024.

He is the son of István Pásztor, who led the VMSZ from 2008 until his death in 2023.

== Early life and private career ==
Pásztor was born in Subotica, in what was then the Socialist Autonomous Province of Vojvodina in the Socialist Republic of Serbia, Socialist Federal Republic of Yugoslavia. Raised in the community, he later received a bachelor's degree (2002), a master's degree (2011), and a Ph.D (2018) from the University of Belgrade Faculty of Law. He began working as a legal advisor to the Pannon Invest Consortium in Subotica in 2002 and was director of the company from 2004 to 2007.

== Politician ==
=== Early years (2000–07) ===
Pásztor took part in protests against Slobodan Milošević's government in the 1990s and joined the VMSZ in 2000. The party contested the 2000 Serbian parliamentary election as part of the Democratic Opposition of Serbia (DOS) coalition, and Pásztor worked in the DOS's election headquarters with responsibility for printing and distributing Hungarian language campaign literature.

Concerning his status as the son of a famous politician, Pásztor once said, "Politics has been a topic of discussion in our home, especially so during the 1990s, when I was a law student in Belgrade and member of the DOS election staff, but my father neither pushed me into politics nor tried to prevent my political engagement." When asked if his own political success had been the result of nepotism, he responded, "To be honest, I think that my circumstances are really no help to me. I think that my father is stricter towards me than other MPs."

Throughout his political career, Pásztor has advocated for the decentralisation of Serbia's government and the creation of a majority-Hungarian administrative district in northern Vojvodina, while also stressing his opposition to separatism. He was a member of Serbia's Hungarian National Council from 2002 to 2010 and was the chair of its executive committee from 2002 to 2009.

=== Member of the National Assembly ===
==== Koštunica administration (2007–08) ====
Pásztor received the thirty-second position on the VMSZ's electoral list in the 2007 Serbian parliamentary election. The party won three seats, and he was included afterward in its assembly delegation. (From 2000 to 2011, Serbian parliamentary mandates were awarded to sponsoring parties or coalitions rather than to individual candidates, and it was common practice for mandates to be assigned out of numerical order. Pásztor's relatively low position on the list had no formal bearing on his chances of election.) After the election, he became the leader of a parliamentary group comprising four parties representing national minority communities.

The VMSZ served in opposition at this time, and Pásztor was a vocal critic of Vojislav Koštunica's administration. In his first term, he was a member of the legislative committee and the committee on foreign affairs.

==== Cvetković administration (2008–12) ====
Pásztor received the sixth position on the electoral list of the Hungarian Coalition, a multi-party alliance led by the VMSZ, in the 2008 parliamentary election. The coalition won four mandates, all of which were assigned to VMSZ members, and Pásztor was again included in his party's delegation. After the election, he became the leader of a reconstituted assembly group representing three national minority parties. The overall results of the election were inconclusive, but the For a European Serbia (ZES) alliance led by the Democratic Party (DS) ultimately formed a coalition government with the Socialist Party of Serbia (SPS). The new ministry, led by Mirko Cvetković, had only a narrow majority in parliament and was often dependent on the VMSZ for its survival. Shortly before the assembly voted on the new administration, Pásztor threatened to withdraw support unless the government created a new ministry of human and minority rights. The ministry was created, and the VMSZ members voted in favour of Cvetković's government.

Pásztor and the VMSZ refused to support a late 2008 government bill to reform the jurisdictional zones of Serbia's courts and public prosecution departments, although they continued to support the administration more generally. In 2009, Pásztor led the VMSZ in supporting a bill allowing for the direct election of national minority councils. He called for Serbia to join the North Atlantic Treaty Organization (NATO) in this period, arguing that it was a necessary step for the country to join the European Union (EU).

The VMSZ became increasingly alienated from the Cvetković administration in late 2009. While the party did not move into active opposition, it refused to support the government's budget for 2010, and Pásztor indicated to the newspaper Danas that he did not see the party's alliance with the DS as a long-term commitment. During this period, the VMSZ took part in strategic discussions with Viktor Orbán, the leader of Hungary's Fidesz party; some in the Serbian media speculated that, under Orbán's influence, the VMSZ would break its alliance with the DS and support the opposition Serbian Progressive Party (SNS). Pásztor rejected this, saying that the VMSZ had also met with other political parties in Hungary and was open to renewed co-operation with the DS in the future. The VMSZ ultimately became somewhat reconciled with the Cvetković administration and supported its 2011 budget.

In October 2011, Pásztor argued that Serbia's law on the restitution of property seized by communist authorities after World War II should be amended to permit a greater number of claims from the country's Hungarian community. He was quoted as saying, "We do not demand restitution for fascists or war criminals. However, we do think that responsibility (for war-time activities) should be judged individually, and those found not guilty should be entitled for restitution."

In his second assembly term, Pásztor was a member of the foreign affairs committee and the finance committee, a deputy member of the justice and administration committee and the committee on European integration, and a member of the parliamentary friendship groups with Hungary, Israel, the Sovereign Order of Malta, and Spain.

==== Dačić, Vučić, and Brnabić administrations (2012–23) ====
Serbia's electoral system was reformed in 2011, such that all parliamentary mandates were awarded to candidates on successful lists in numerical order. Pásztor was given the first position on the VMSZ's list in the 2012 parliamentary election and was elected to a third term when the list won five mandates. The Progressive Party's Let's Get Serbia Moving alliance won the election and afterward formed a new coalition government with the Socialist Party and other parties. The VMSZ was invited to join the government but declined; Pásztor indicated that his party would be a constructive opposition and would offer support for laws ensuring Serbia's accession to the European Union. In this parliament, Pásztor was a member of the committee on constitutional affairs and legislation, a deputy member of the judiciary committee (Note: Formally known as the Committee on the Judiciary, Public Administration, and Local Self-Government.) and the committee on European integration, and a member of the friendship groups with Poland and Spain.

He again led the VMSZ's electoral list in the 2014 parliamentary election and was re-elected when the party won six seats. After the election, the VMSZ began providing parliamentary support to Serbia's SNS-led administration. Pásztor had the same committee assignments as in the previous parliament except that he was promoted to full membership on the judiciary committee; he also led Serbia's friendship group with Spain and remained a member of the friendship group with Poland. He was elected to a fifth term in the 2016 parliamentary election, in which the VMSZ won four seats, and continued in the same committee and friendship group roles as before.

The VMSZ campaigned for the "No" side (i.e., the side favoured by Hungarian prime minister Viktor Orbán) in the 2016 Hungarian migrant quota referendum, in which many Vojvodina Hungarians were eligible to vote. When asked if the non-binding referendum would have any legal effect, his response was, "This is about making our opinions clearly understood."

The VMSZ led a successful drive to increase its voter turnout in the 2020 Serbian parliamentary election and won a record nine seats in the national assembly. Pásztor, who once again led the party's list, was elected to a sixth term. In this parliament, he again served on the committee on constitutional and legal issues, led Serbia's parliamentary friendship group with Spain, and was a member of the friendship group with Poland. Pásztor also led the VMSZ's list for the Subotica city assembly in the concurrent 2020 Serbian local elections and was elected when the list won twenty-two out of sixty-seven mandates. The SNS won the election in the city and afterward formed a local coalition government with the VMSZ. As part of the coalition arrangement, Pásztor became president of the local assembly on 21 August 2020.

He led the VMSZ's list for a fifth consecutive time in the 2022 Serbian parliamentary election and was re-elected as the party fell back to five seats. In this term, he was a member of the judiciary committee, once again the leader of Serbia's parliamentary friendship group with Spain, and a member of the friendship groups with Austria and Poland.

=== Party leader (2023–present) ===
István Pásztor died on 30 October 2023. The following day, Balint Pásztor was named as the VMSZ's acting leader.

Pásztor again led the VMSZ's list in the 2023 Serbian parliamentary election and was elected to an eighth term when the list won six seats. The SNS and its allies won a majority victory, and Pásztor afterward represented the VMSZ in negotiations for a new administration. He said that his party was not seeking ministerial positions but wanted to remain part of the government at the state secretary level.

Pásztor was elected as leader of the VMSZ at a party convention in Senta on 2 March 2024. He was the only candidate for the position and received the support of 333 out of 335 delegates in attendance. In the national assembly, he is once again is the leader of the VMSZ's assembly group, serves on the judiciary committee, leads the friendship group with Spain, and is a member of the friendship group with Poland.

He led the VMSZ's list for Subotica in the 2024 Serbian local elections and was re-elected to the city assembly when the list won nineteen seats. When the new assembly convened on 10 July, he stood down as president – and, in fact, resigned his seat – saying that he wanted to focus on his work in the national assembly and as party leader.
