= Emir Elfić =

Serbian Bosniak politician (born 1977)

Emir Elfić (Serbian Cyrillic: Емир Елфић; born 31 August 1977) is a Serbian Bosniak politician and diplomat. He served in the National Assembly of Serbia from 2012 to 2014 and has held high political office at the city level in Novi Pazar. From 2016 to 2022, Elfić served as Serbia's ambassador to Lebanon.

== Early life and career ==
Elfić was born in Novi Pazar, in the Sandžak region of what was then the Socialist Republic of Serbia in the Socialist Federal Republic of Yugoslavia. He is a graduate of the Faculty of Trade and Banking at BK University in Belgrade.

He was a brother-in-law to the late Muamer Zukorlić, Chief Mufti of the Islamic Community in Serbia, with whom he was at one time politically aligned.

== Politics ==
=== Early years (2008–12) ===
In 2008, Elfić became assistant to the mayor of Novi Pazar for infrastructure and investments.

Serbia organized the first direct elections for the country's national minority councils in 2010. Elfić was elected to the Bosniak National Council on the electoral list of Zukorlić's Bosniak Cultural Community, which won seventeen mandates, as against thirteen for the Bosniak List led by Sulejman Ugljanin and five for the Bosniak Renaissance list of Rasim Ljajić. These results proved to be extremely contentious, and the legitimacy of the Bosniak Cultural Community's victory was contested by both the Serbian government and Ugljanin's party. Zukorlić's group held a constituent session for the council on 7 July 2010, which was also attended by two delegates from Bosniak Renaissance. At this meeting, Elfić was chosen as the council's deputy chair. This iteration of the council continued to meet afterward but was not recognized by the Serbian government. Elfić resigned as assistant to Novi Pazar's mayor in September 2010, citing what he described as government discrimination against the Bosniak community and attempts by the state to utilize waqf property for secular purposes.

In September 2010, Elfić was chosen as leader of the newly formed Bosniak Democratic Union (Bošnjačka demokratska zajednica, BDZ), a political party closely associated with Zukorlić's movement. He said that the party's main purpose was to promote the national identity of the Bosniak community, while also maintaining good relations with the Serb community in the region.

As party leader, Elfić called for the Sandžak to be recognized as an autonomous region in Serbia. In a May 2011 interview, he rejected the idea that this would contribute to the disintegration of Serbia. He was quoted as saying, "We see our autonomy as contributing to European integrations. We do not regard autonomy as a disintegration project, but rather as the project to advance and integrate the region. We want Sandžak to be as it has been throughout is long history - a region that brings together rather than separates."

In January 2012, Elfić condemned Serbian president Boris Tadić for attending a twentieth-anniversary celebration of the Republika Srpska in Banja Luka (commemorating the anniversary of the entity's de facto creation prior to the Bosnian War, not its sanctioned establishment in the Dayton Agreement). Elfić argued that the event commemorated the foundation of a "parastate and paramilitary" that committed aggression against Bosnia and Herzegovina and ethnic cleansing against the Bosniak community.

=== Parliamentarian (2012–14) ===
The BDZ contested the 2012 Serbian parliamentary election as part of the All Together alliance, which also included parties representing Serbia's Croat, Slovak, and Hungarian communities. Elfić received the lead position on the alliance's electoral list and was elected to the national assembly when it won a single mandate. The results overall were a disappointment for Zukorlić's movement, which received far less support in the Sandžak than most pundits expected.

There was a falling out between Elfić and Zukorlić in 2013, and the BDZ split into rival factions. The pro-Zukorlić wing of the party held a convention that deposed Elfić and named Jahja Fehratović as party leader; Elfić rejected the legitimacy of this convention, describing it as an act of aggression against the party. The division ultimately led to a party split; Elfić continued to lead the BDZ, while the group led by Zukorlić and Fehratović became the Bosniak Democratic Union of Sandžak (Bošnjačka demokratska zajednica Sandžaka, BDZS).

Elfić led another version of the All Together coalition in the 2014 Serbian parliamentary election. The list did not receive enough votes to win any mandates, and the BDZ generally became inactive after this time.

After leaving parliament, Elfić became aligned with Rasim Ljajić's Sandžak Democratic Party (Sandžačka demokratska partija, SDP). He was appointed to the Novi Pazar city council in 2014 with responsibility for international co-operation and remained in this role for the next two years. In 2015, it was reported that Ljajić proposed Elfić to become Serbia's ambassador to Lebanon.

=== Ambassador (2016–2022) ===
Elfić was appointed as Serbia's ambassador to Lebanon in 2016. He was recalled from this role in October 2022.
