= Bosniak Democratic Union =

Bosniak Democratic Union Bošnjačka demokratska zajednica Бошњачка демократска заједница
- Abbreviation: BDZ
- Leader: Emir Elfić
- Founder: Emir Elfić
- Founded: 25 December 2010
- Headquarters: Novi Pazar
- Ideology: Bosniak minority interests
- Colours: Green

Website
- bdz.rs

Bosniak Democratic Union (Serbian: Бошњачка демократска заједница, romanized: Bošnjačka demokratska stranka, BDZ) is a political party in Serbia, representing the Bosniak ethnic minority. It is led by Emir Elfić.

== History ==
It was founded on 25 December 2010 in Novi Pazar. Its founder and leader is economist Emir Elfić (as of 2016). The party led the All Together ethnic minority political alliance that participated in the 2012 parliamentary election. The alliance received 24,993 votes (0.63%) and 1 seat in the parliament. In the 2014 elections, the alliance received 3,983 votes (0.11%) and lost its seat. The alliance was dissolved. In March 2016, the BDZ and the Sandžak Democratic Party agreed on a coalition. It did not participate in the 2016 elections.

== Sources ==
- BDZ (25 December 2010). "Osnivački akt". BDZ.
- Večernje novosti (6 March 2016). "Sporazum BDZ i SDP: Zajedno na sve izbore". B92.
