= Aleksandar Višnjić =

Serbian politician

Aleksandar Višnjić (Serbian Cyrillic: Александар Вишњић, born 20 March 1976) is a Serbian politician. He was the leader of Reformist Party which took part as an independent list in 2007 and 2008 parliamentary elections, but won no seats. He was a member of the Democratic Party (DS), but left in 2004/5. Višnjić was later part of Conservative Reformist Party and since 2023, he has been a member of New Face of Serbia.
