= Bosniak Democratic Party of Sandžak =

Bosniak Democratic Party of Sandžak Bošnjačka demokratska stranka Sandžaka Бошњачка демократска странка Санџака
- Abbreviation: BDSS
- Leader: Esad Džudžo
- Founded: 15 June 1996
- Dissolved: 18 August 2017
- Merged into: Party of Democratic Action of Sandžak
- Ideology: Bosniak minority interests

Website
- bdssandzaka.rs (archived)

The Bosniak Democratic Party of Sandžak (Serbian / Bosnian: Бошњачка демократска странка Санџака / Bošnjačka demokratska stranka Sandžaka) was a Bosniak minority party in Serbia.

== History ==
The party was formally dissolved in August 2017, though its leader Esad Džudžo had been out of politics since 2012. He has stated that he feels the SDA Sandžak is continuing the work of the BDSS and the List for Sandžak coalition, of which both had been a part until 2012.

== Electoral results ==
=== Parliamentary elections ===
| Year | Popular vote | % of popular vote | # of seats | Seat change | Coalitions | Government |
|---|---|---|---|---|---|---|
| 2003 | 481,249 | 12.58% | 1 / 250 | ▲1 | With DS–GSS–DC–SDU | opposition |
| 2007 | 33,823 | 0.84% | 2 / 250 | ▲1 | List for Sandžak | opposition |
| 2008 | 38,148 | 0.92% | 1 / 250 | ▼1 | List for Sandžak | government |
