= László Rác Szabó =

Serbian politician (born 1957)

László Rác Szabó (born 12 May 1957 in Senta, Serbia, Yugoslavia) is a Hungarian politician based in Serbia. He is the leader of Hungarian Civic Alliance.

He used to be a member of Alliance of Vojvodina Hungarians (VMSZ) until he left in 2000. During the 2026 Hungarian parliamentary election he supported Mi Hazánk.
