= Democratic Union of Croats =

Political party in Serbia

Democratic Union of Croats Демократска заједница Хрвата Demokratska zajednica Hrvata
- Abbreviation: DZH
- Leader: Marinko Prćić
- Founded: 25 July 2007
- Headquarters: Age Mamužića 5, Subotica
- Ideology: Croat minority interests Vojvodina autonomism
- National affiliation: Coalition for Peace and Tolerance
- Colors: Red; White; Blue

Website
- dzhweb.org.rs

The Democratic Union of Croats (Croatian: Demokratska zajednica Hrvata, Serbian: Демократска заједница Хрвата, DZH) is a political party in Serbia representing the Croat ethnic minority in the province of Vojvodina.

It was founded on 25 July 2007, and the party seat is in Subotica, Age Mamužića 5 Street. Chronologically, DZH was fourth party of Croats from Serbia and third that emerged from dissatisfied fractions of the Democratic Alliance of Croats in Vojvodina. Party President is Đorđe Čović (since 9 November 2007).

== Participation in elections ==
On 25 April 2008, DZH signed an agreement with Hungarian Coalition, in which it supported Hungarian Coalition on Serbian parliamentary elections in 2008.

On Presidential Elections in Serbia in 2008, DZH appealed its members to support Boris Tadić in 2nd electoral round.

On Parliamentary Elections in the autonomous province of Vojvodina in 2008, DZH joined the list Zajedno za Vojvodinu - Nenad Čanak, led by League of Social Democrats of Vojvodina.
