= Hungarian Civic Alliance (Serbia) =

Political party in Serbia

Hungarian Civic Alliance Грађански савез Мађара Magyar Polgári Szövetség
- Abbreviation: MPSZ, GSM
- Leader: László Rác Szabó
- Founded: 12 December 2006
- Headquarters: dr Zorana Đinđića 19, Senta
- Ideology: Hungarian minority interests Regionalism; Hungarian nationalism
- Political position: Far-right
- National affiliation: Coalition for Peace and Tolerance
- Regional affiliation: Our Homeland Movement
- Colours: Green

Hungarian Civic Alliance (Hungarian: Magyar Polgári Szövetség, abbr. MPSZ; Serbian: Грађански савез Мађара, romanised: Građanski savez Mađara, abbr. GSM) is political party in Serbia, representing the Hungarian minority in Vojvodina. It is led by László Rác Szabó.

== Participation in elections ==
=== 2008 elections ===
In 2008 local elections in Serbia, the Hungarian Civic Alliance won 12.97% of votes in Senta and two seats in the municipal parliament in Ada.

=== 2012 elections ===
In the 2012 elections in Serbia, the party was part of the All Together coalition, which won 1 seat in the Serbian parliament, no seats in the provincial parliament of Vojvodina and no plurality of votes in any municipality in Vojvodina.

== See also ==
- All Together (Serbia)
