= United Regions of Serbia =

Political party in Serbia

United Regions of Serbia Уједињени региони Србије
- Founder: Mlađan Dinkić
- Founded: 16 May 2010 (as coalition); 20 April 2013 (as party)
- Dissolved: 13 November 2015
- Preceded by: G17 Plus
- Headquarters: Belgrade
- Membership (2012): 220,000
- Ideology: Regionalism; Liberal conservatism; Pro-Europeanism
- Political position: Centre-right
- European affiliation: European People's Party (associate)
- International affiliation: International Democrat Union

Website
- ujedinjeniregionisrbije.rs (archived URL)

The United Regions of Serbia (Serbian: Уједињени региони Србије, romanized: Ujedinjeni regioni Srbije; abbr. УРС, URS) was a regionalist, liberal-conservative political party in Serbia. It was founded on 16 May 2010 as a political coalition, and became a unified political party on 21 April 2013. The URS advocated decentralization and was pro-business.

The URS received 5.51% of the popular vote in the 2012 parliamentary election. Following the election, the URS formed a coalition government with the Serbian Progressive Party and Socialist Party of Serbia. On 31 July 2013 the URS was ousted from the government and became opposition.

On 13 November 2015 the party was removed from the register of political parties and ceased to exist, which was controversial because the party had over a million euros of unpaid debt. It had already been defunct for more than a year, according to the former president Mlađan Dinkić. Even though the party has been long gone, it has remained in the party register of Serbia since then.

The URS was an associate member of the European People's Party. In the Parliamentary Assembly of the Council of Europe, URS was associated with the European People's Party.

== Electoral results ==
=== Parliamentary elections ===
National Assembly of Serbia
| Election | # of votes | % of vote | # of seats | +/- | Notes | Government |
|---|---|---|---|---|---|---|
| 2012 | 215,666 | 5.51% | 16 / 250 | 16 | as coalition | government, 2012–2013 |
| 2012 | 215,666 | 5.51% | 16 / 250 | 16 | as coalition | opposition, 2013–2014 |
| 2014 | 109,167 | 3.04% | 0 / 250 | ▼16 | as party | extra-parliamentary |

=== Presidential elections ===
President of Serbia
| Election year | Candidate | # | 1st round votes | % of popular vote | # | 2nd round votes | % of popular vote |
|---|---|---|---|---|---|---|---|
| 2012 | Zoran Stanković | 5th | 257,054 | 6.58% | —N/a | — | — |

== Leadership of the United Regions of Serbia ==
| # | President | Born–Died | Term start | Term end |
|---|---|---|---|---|
| 1 | Mlađan Dinkić | 1964– | 16 May 2010 | 18 March 2014 |
| a | Veroljub Stevanović | 1946– | 18 March 2014 (acting) | 13 November 2015 (acting) |
| a | Verica Kalanović | 1954– | 18 March 2014 (acting) | 13 November 2015 (acting) |
