= Hungarian Hope Movement =

Hungarian Hope Movement Покрет Мађарске Наде Pokret Mađarske Nade
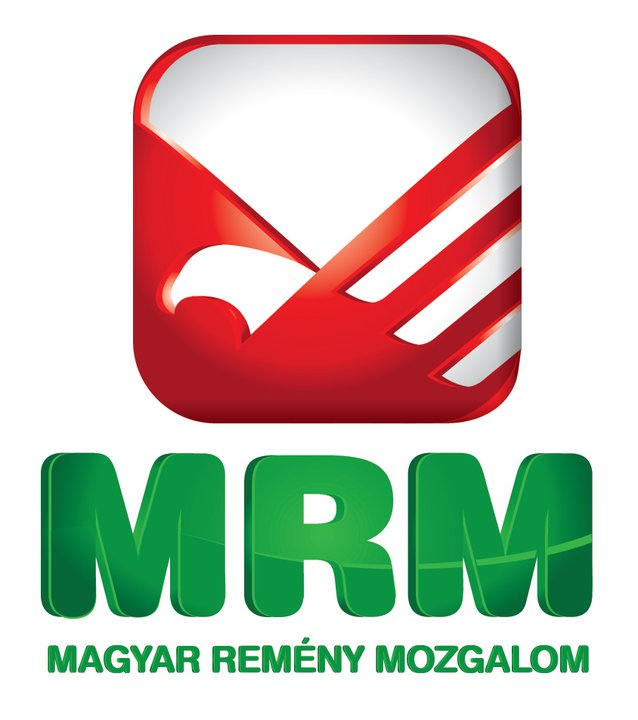
- Hungarian name: Magyar Remény Mozgalom
- Leader: Bálint László
- Founded: 2009
- Dissolved: Inactive: 2014; Officially dissolved: 2018
- Succeeded by: Hungarian Movement
- Headquarters: Subotica
- Ideology: Hungarian minority interests
- Colours: Red-White-Green

Website
- www.mrm.rs

The Hungarian Hope Movement (Hungarian: Magyar Remény Mozgalom (MRM); Serbian: Покрет Мађарске Наде (ПМН)) was a right-wing political party organized by some members of the Hungarian minority in Serbia. It claimed that its aim was to represent the interests for the benefit of all Hungarian people living in the country. Based upon a similar ideological background, it preferred the affiliation with the Movement for a Better Hungary (Jobbik), which is a radical and nationalist party in Hungary.

== Main goals ==
The Hungarian Hope Movement (HHM) was one of the parties of Hungarian minority in Vojvodina. It was formed with the purpose to represent the interests, defend and improve the rights of the Hungarian national community in Serbia. Furthermore, HHP sought to link the Hungarian minority in Serbia with Hungary and with other Hungarian communities in neighboring countries, but also all around the world linguistically, socially, economically and culturally. With these main goals, the Party aimed to develop a bright socio-political future for the Hungarian minority in Serbia and to overturn certain political, demographic, social and economical processes, which were seen as negative by the party.

== Main guidelines ==
The Hungarian Hope Movement (HHM) attempted to represent the short-, mid- and long-term goals which, according to the party, were needed for the development and socio-political survival of the Hungarian community in Vojvodina. The Party prioritized issues which have direct impact on the life of its members and in general, of the Hungarians living in Serbia. HHM was not just a political party, but a movement of actions, which not only dealt with political activity, but also organized protests, movements and actions affecting the province and everyday life. Understanding, joining, practicing and fighting for these objectives is open for everyone. The party claims that it is important that the present and future members of HHM understand that this party "does not want to be part of the meaningless everyday politics but want to help for the Hungarian minority".

== Party positions ==
The HHM had 1 representative in the House of Representatives of the Autonomous Province of Vojvodina, namely Gyula László. The party has 1 chosen member in the Hungarian National Council and further 3 committee members. They also have a delegate in the Board of Trustees of the Szekeres Laszló Foundation, and numerous delegates in several Boards of the Forum of Hungarian Representatives in the Carpathian-basin.

== Participation in elections ==
In 2012 Vojvodina parliamentary election, the party won 0.59% of votes in the province. Ethnic Hungarians, who comprising 14.28% of population of Vojvodina according to 2002 census, mostly voted for Alliance of Vojvodina Hungarians and Democratic Party.
