= Branislav Ivković =

Serbian engineer, academic and politician (1952–2025)

Branislav "Bane" Ivković (Serbian Cyrillic: Бранислав (Бане) Ивковић; 7 August 1952 – 20 November 2025) was a Serbian engineer, academic and politician. He was a cabinet minister in the government of Serbia from 1994 to 2000 and served in the parliaments of Serbia, the Federal Republic of Yugoslavia, and Serbia and Montenegro. At one time a prominent figure in the Socialist Party of Serbia (SPS), he later led the breakaway Socialist People's Party (SNS) in the early 2000s.

== Early life and academic career ==
Ivković was born in Bijeljina, in what was then the People's Republic of Bosnia and Herzegovina in the Federal People's Republic of Yugoslavia. Raised in the community, he graduated from the University of Belgrade Faculty of Civil Engineering in 1979, earned a master's degree in 1983, and received a PhD in 1988 with the thesis, "Optimization of reliability of production systems in construction." He became an assistant at the university in 1981, was promoted to assistant professor in 1989, and became an associate professor in 1994. Ivković participated in engineering projects in Israel, Kuwait, and Russia, as well as in Serbia.

== Politician ==
Ivković's political career began in the 1990s, when the political culture of Serbia and Yugoslavia was dominated by the authoritarian rule of Socialist Party leader Slobodan Milošević.

He received the twenty-fifth position on the Socialist Party's electoral list for the Belgrade division in the 1993 Serbian parliamentary election. The list won sixteen seats, and he was not awarded a mandate. (From 1992 to 2000, Serbia's electoral law stipulated that one-third of parliamentary mandates would be assigned to candidates on successful lists in numerical order, while the remaining two-thirds would be distributed amongst other candidates at the discretion of sponsoring parties or coalitions. Ivković could have been given a mandate despite his list position, though he was not.) The SPS won the election and afterward formed a new government. Ivković became vice-president of the party's city board in Belgrade.

=== Minister of Urban Development and Housing (1994–1998) ===
Ivković was appointed minister of urban development and housing in the first government of Mirko Marjanović on 18 March 1994. One of his responsibilities was finding accommodations for the large numbers of refugees who arrived in Serbia during the Yugoslav Wars of the mid-1990s. In September 1995, he described a $41.5 million pledge for refugee aid from the United Nations and related organizations as "very meagre as compared to our needs." In February 1996, he said that refugees living in the Federal Republic of Yugoslavia should be permitted to return safely to their former homes.

He announced a fifteen-year plan for a cable television network in Serbia in 1996, noting the possibility of concessions to international investors.

In April 1997, Ivković introduced a legislative package that, among other things, gave legal standing to several housing units that had been illegally constructed in the period up to and including November 1995. The stated purpose of this reform was to remove the threat of eviction from low-income households residing in these units. In response to Serbia's chronic financial issues, he also oversaw the passing of a controversial law that permitted international concessions for Serbia's roads, power plants, airports, and other state property; he later introduced complementary regional development legislation allowing international mining concessions. In September 1997, he announced the creation of a state agency to co-ordinate activities related to international investments in Serbia. In the same period, he introduced "tax holidays" in a bid to persuade construction firms that had left Serbia due to international sanctions in the Yugoslav wars to return to the country.

In October 1997, Ivković signed an agreement to restructure Serbia's debts with Russian energy firm Gazprom, allowing for half of the total debt to be paid via construction projects over the next two years.

=== Leader of the Belgrade SPS (1995–1997) ===
Ivković's political profile rose significantly in November 1995, when he was appointed president of the SPS's Belgrade board. This occurred against the backdrop of major personnel shifts in the party at the conclusion of the Bosnian War, when Milošević removed a number of figures considered too "hardline" in their views.

==== 1996 local elections ====
Ivković led the SPS's campaign in Belgrade in the 1996 Serbian local elections. The local party organization was divided during this time, with Ivković and incumbent Belgrade mayor Nebojša Čović leading rival factions. Rumours circulated that Ivković and Čović would be rivals for the mayor's office in the event of a SPS victory. In the event, the opposition Zajedno (English: Together) coalition won a majority victory in the Belgrade election. State authorities did not initially accept the opposition's victories in Belgrade and other major cities, leading to an extended series of protests; the state's response to the protests was often violent.

Ivković was rebuked for the SPS's poor performance in Belgrade. After initial reports of the SPS's defeat, he told party officials that "legal possibilities" existed for annulling a number of opposition mandates and giving the Socialists victory in a repeat vote. Opposition victories in several constituencies were indeed annulled by the city's election commission, and repeat elections were called for 27 November. Ivković was a vocal advocate of the repeat election process, at one time telling the Belgrade election commission, "If the results are what we expect and which we feel are right, we’ll quickly organize a city assembly because we have to continue living normally in this city." The opposition boycotted the repeat vote, describing the process as fraudulent, and several SPS and aligned candidates were accordingly declared elected by default.

The opposition protests continued after the repeat elections in Belgrade. Ivković helped to organize a "counter-protest" rally of Milošević's allies that was meant to end the controversy but instead resulted in increased protests from the administration's opponents. In January 1997, the Belgrade election commission annulled the repeat elections and reinstated the victory of Zajedno. Ivković said that the SPS would appeal the decision, but before this could happen he was replaced as the party's Belgrade leader by Dragan Tomić. In the aftermath of these events, Čović described Ivković as "the man most responsible" for the party's defeat in the city and accused him of election fraud. Ivković later remarked that he voted for his own dismissal as local SPS leader, having by this time lost any desire the continue in the role.

The Belgrade election commission's recognition of the opposition's victory did not bring a final end to the election controversy, and the state authorities ultimately recognized the victory of Zajedno in Belgrade and other jurisdictions via a "lex specialis" in February 1997. Notwithstanding the broader controversy, Ivković was personally elected for New Belgrade's fourth division.

Ivković later sought to initiate a dialogue with student leaders over the 1996–97 protests in his capacity as a University of Belgrade professor. The students responded, "Your hands are bloody, blood was spilled because of your counter rally. You are too late."

=== Federal parliamentarian (1996–2000) ===
Ivković led the SPS's electoral list for New Belgrade in the 1996 Yugoslavian parliamentary election, which was held concurrently with the local elections, and was elected when the list won two seats in the division for the Yugoslavian assembly's Chamber of Citizens. The SPS alliance won the election, and Ivković served in the federal parliament for the term that followed. In May 1998, he supported the removal of Radoje Kontić as Yugoslavian prime minister and the election of Momir Bulatović as his successor.

=== Minister of Science and Technology (1998–2000) ===
The SPS formed a new Serbian coalition government with the far-right Serbian Radical Party (SRS) and the Yugoslav Left (JUL) after the 1997 Serbian parliamentary election. On 24 March 1998, Ivković was reassigned as Serbia's minister of science and technology. He was also appointed to the provisional executive council for Kosovo later in 1998; in October of that year, he attended a meeting of the council in Priština.

During the 1999 NATO bombing of Yugoslavia, Ivković took part in "human shield" rallies on Belgrade's bridges. At one such rally in April 1999, he was quoted as saying of NATO's actions, "We must oppose with all our forces the new techno-fascism, which is worse than at the time of Adolf Hitler." In the same period, he called for closer co-operation between Serbia's ministries to maximize the country's resources and re-establish production in factories destroyed by NATO bombing.

In August 1999, following the conclusion of NATO's bombing campaign, Ivković spoke at an event in Serbia called "Diaspora 99" and claimed that the country had produced its own air-to-air missiles. He received applause when he said, "Some wish to turn us into a colony and they have thus introduced sanctions against us [...] They are trying to bring us to our knees economically and then buy us. We will not let ourselves be turned into a colony and that is why we are counting on you." Later in the year, he took part in a Serbian delegation to China to promote greater scientific and technological co-operation.

Ivković led a team of scientists and researchers to Iraq in June 2000 in a bid to improve relations between the two countries.

=== 2000 Yugoslavian elections and fall of Milošević ===
Ivković did not seek re-election to the Chamber of Citizens in the 2000 Yugoslavian general election but instead appeared in the tenth position on the SPS's electoral list for the upper house of the Yugoslavian parliament, the Chamber of Republics. At one point in the campaign, he took part in a radio debate on B92 with Nebojša Čović, who by this time had left the SPS and joined the rival Democratic Opposition of Serbia (DOS). When a series of polls taken in early September 2000 showed DOS candidate Vojislav Koštunica leading Slobodan Milošević in the Yugoslavian presidential election, Ivković accused the American Central Intelligence Agency (CIA) of involvement, saying that the organization was seeking to manipulate those undecided voters who "always go along with the strongest."

Koštunica ultimately defeated Milošević in the Yugoslavian presidential election, which turned out to be a watershed moment in Serbian and Yugoslavian politics. As in 1996, the state authorities did not initially accept the result and sought to introduce a repeat vote; following large-scale protests, however, Milošević's administration fell on 5 October 2000.

The DOS also defeated the SPS in the Yugoslavian parliamentary election. In the election for the Chamber of Republics, the DOS won ten seats as against seven for the SPS; Ivković did not receive an automatic mandate and was not included in his party's delegation for the new parliament. He was also defeated in his bid for re-election to the City Assembly of Belgrade in the concurrent 2000 Serbian local elections, losing to a candidate of the DOS in the downtown municipality of Vračar.

The SPS continued to dominate Serbia's republican government in the early days after Milošević's downfall, and on 11 October 2000 Ivković issued a direct challenge to Koštunica's federal administration by saying that Serbia would assume direct control over the 100,000-member police force within its borders. Ultimately, however, the government was unable to continue in office in the absence of Milošević, and a new transitional government comprising the SPS, the DOS, and the Serbian Renewal Movement (SPO) took office pending a new Serbian parliamentary election in December. The SPS initially nominated Ivković to continue as minister of science and technology in the new administration, but the DOS objected to his candidacy, with Nebojša Čović accusing him of responsibility for the beating of student protestors in 1996–97. Ivković rejected Čović's accusation but agreed to withdraw his candidacy rather than delay the new administration, and his term in cabinet ended on 25 October 2000.

=== SPS leader in the Serbian parliament (2001–2002) ===
Serbia's election laws were reformed prior to the 2000 Serbian parliamentary election, such that the entire country became a single electoral division and all mandates were awarded to candidates on successful lists at the discretion of the sponsoring parties or coalitions, irrespective of numerical order. Ivković appeared in the sixty-fifth position on the SPS's list, which was mostly arranged in alphabetical order. The list won thirty-seven seats, and he was chosen as part of his party's delegation. When the new parliament convened in January 2001, he became the leader of the SPS's assembly group. The DOS won a landslide majority victory with 176 out of 250 seats, and the SPS served in opposition.

Ivković was initially seen as a close associate of Slobodan Milošević in this period. On 7 March 2001, he said that he had recently visited Miloševič and described the former president as being in good spirits despite reports that he would soon be arrested on suspicion of war crimes. On 31 March, he played a crucial role in negotiating for Milošević to submit to an arrest warrant, bringing an end to an armed standoff at his mansion. When rumours circulated about Milošević's pending extradition to the International Criminal Tribunal for the former Yugoslavia (ICTY) in The Hague, Ivković spoke at a protest outside the Yugoslavian parliament building.

According to a report in the British newspaper The Independent, Milošević turned against Ivković in July 2000, describing him as a "traitor" who knew that his extradition was imminent but did nothing to prevent it. Ivković acknowledged being in conflict with Milošević's wife Mirjana Marković during this period, although he said in August 2001 that their disagreements had been resolved and denied reports of a broader division in the party. He was not, at this time, removed from his role in the party leadership.

In early 2001, Ivković was investigated on suspicion of having directed funds from the ministry of science and technology to the SPS while he was a cabinet minister. He was also accused of illegally distributing several state apartments. He rejected the charges and said that he would not invoke parliamentary immunity in his defense. (His immunity was, in any event, removed in October 2001).

=== SPS split and Socialist People's Party leader (2002–2004) ===
The SPS split in early 2002, with several party members accusing Ivković of co-operating with Serbia's DOS administration and attempting a party takeover. Milošević openly turned against Ivković at this time, accusing him of overseeing a "fifth column" bid to lead others away from the party. In April 2002, Ivković was formally expelled from the SPS. He rejected the legality of his expulsion and organized a congress of his supporters in June 2002, describing the event as a SPS meeting that would lead to renewal in the party. He was formally chosen as the group's leader at this meeting; he paid tribute to Milošević in his acceptance speech but also called for the SPS to adopt a reformist approach under new leadership. In this period, Ivković was often described in the international media as a "moderate."

Ultimately, Ivković's group did not retain ownership of the SPS name. He ran in the September 2002 Serbian presidential election as the leader of an independent group called "Socialists for Return to the Basics" and was defeated, receiving just over one per cent of the vote. In October 2002, he announced plans to create a new party that would simply be called the Socialist Party (PS).

Ivković and his supporters established an assembly group called the People's Socialists (Narodni socijalisti) in November 2002. The DOS government had experienced several splits and defections by this time, and the following month Ivković's group co-operated with the administration on a crucial budgetary vote for the upcoming year.

The Federal Republic of Yugoslavia was formally reconstituted as the State Union of Serbia and Montenegro in February 2003, and the Assembly of Serbia and Montenegro was established as its legislative branch. The first members of this body were chosen by indirect election from the republican parliaments of Serbia and Montenegro, with each parliamentary group allowed representation proportional to its numbers. Only sitting members of the Serbian assembly or the Montenegrin assembly, or members of the Federal Assembly of Yugoslavia at the time of the country's reconstitution, were eligible to serve. The "People's Socialists" group was allotted one seat in the federal assembly, which was assigned to Ivković.

During this period, Ivković was a member of the committee for constitutional affairs and the committee for science and technological development in the republican parliament.

Ivković's group coalesced as the Serbian People's Party (SNS) later in 2003. In September of that year, he proposed that the SPS and his party run a joint candidate in the upcoming presidential election. The SPS rejected the offer, and Ivica Dačić accused Ivković of wanting to assist the DOS by running as a candidate himself.

The SNS contested the 2003 Serbian parliamentary election in an alliance with a group called the People's Blok. Ivković appeared in the second position on the party's list, after former SPS parliamentarian Dobrivoje Budimirović. The list did not cross the electoral threshold, and Ivković's terms in the federal and republican parliaments ended in early 2004. He later ran as the SNS's candidate in the 2004 Serbian presidential election and received less than one per cent of the vote.

Ivković joined Bogoljub Karić's Strength of Serbia Movement (PSS) after the 2004 presidential election. The SNS afterward considered merging into the PSS, though it ultimately rejected the option.

Ivković did not return to active political life after this time. Following Milošević's death in 2006, it was reported that he was the only former SPS "dissident" whose return to the party would not be welcomed.

== After 2006 ==
Ivković joined the Serbian Progressive Party (SNS) in 2012. He was named to the supervisory board of Energoprojekt in 2013 and was appointed to a new term in 2017.

In a January 2018 court decision, he was acquitted of charges of having illegally allocated state apartments in 2000.

Ivković said in a May 2022 interview that Serbian prime minister Zoran Đinđić had assisted Milošević's defence at the ICTY beginning in the summer of 2002 and was planning a massive shakeup in the Serbian government prior to his assassination in March 2003. Concerning his own political history, Ivković said that his departure from the SPS had been orchestrated by Mirjana Marković. He added that he had faced several criminal charges related to his time in cabinet and had been acquitted in all proceedings.

Ivković died on 20 November 2025, at the age of 73.

== Electoral record ==
=== Serbia (President of Serbia) ===
2004 Serbian presidential election (first and second rounds)
Candidate	Party	First round		Second round	
Candidate	Party	Votes	%	Votes	%
Boris Tadić	Democratic Party	853,584	27.70	1,681,528	53.97
Tomislav Nikolić	Serbian Radical Party	954,339	30.97	1,434,068	46.03
Bogoljub Karić	Citizens' Group	568,691	18.46		
Dragan Maršićanin	Democratic Party of Serbia–G17 Plus–Serbian Renewal Movement–New Serbia	414,971	13.47		
Ivica Dačić	Socialist Party of Serbia	125,952	4.09		
Jelisaveta Karađorđević	Citizens' Group: Initiative for a More Beautiful Serbia	62,737	2.04		
Milovan Drecun	Serbian Revival	16,907	0.55		
Vladan Batić	Christian Democratic Party	16,795	0.55		
Borislav Pelević	Party of Serbian Unity	14,317	0.46		
Branislav Ivković	Socialist People's Party	13,980	0.45		
Ljiljana Aranđelović	United Serbia	11,796	0.38		
Marijan Rističević	People's Peasant Party	10,198	0.33		
Dragan Đorđević	Party of Serbian Citizens	5,785	0.19		
Mirko Jović	People's Radical Party, Serbia and Diaspora, European Blok	5,546	0.18		
Zoran Milinković	Patriotic Party of Diaspora	5,442	0.18		
Total		3,081,040	100.00	3,115,596	100.00
Valid votes		3,081,040	98.78	3,115,596	98.64
Invalid/blank votes		38,047	1.22	42,975	1.36
Total votes		3,119,087	100.00	3,158,571	100.00
Registered voters/turnout		6,532,263	47.75	6,532,940	48.35
Source: RIK

September–October 2002 Serbian presidential election (first and second rounds)
Candidate	Party	First round		Second round	
Candidate	Party	Votes	%	Votes	%
Vojislav Koštunica	Democratic Party of Serbia	1,123,420	31.56	1,991,947	68.38
Miroljub Labus	Citizens' Group: Best for Serbia – Miroljub Labus	995,200	27.96	921,094	31.62
Vojislav Šešelj	Serbian Radical Party	845,308	23.74		
Vuk Drašković	Serbian Renewal Movement	159,959	4.49		
Borislav Pelević	Party of Serbian Unity	139,047	3.91		
Bata Živojinović	Socialist Party of Serbia	119,052	3.34		
Nebojša Pavković	Citizens' Group	75,662	2.13		
Branislav-Bane Ivković	Citizens' Group: Socialists for Return to the Basics	42,853	1.20		
Vuk Obradović	Social Democracy	26,050	0.73		
Tomislav Lalošević	Citizens' Group	25,133	0.71		
Dragan Radenović	Citizens' Group: Society of Free Citizens	8,280	0.23		
Total		3,559,964	100.00	2,913,041	100.00
Valid votes		3,559,964	97.95	2,913,041	97.80
Invalid/blank votes		74,534	2.05	65,427	2.20
Total votes		3,634,498	100.00	2,978,468	100.00
Registered voters/turnout		6,553,042	55.46	6,553,042	45.45
Source: RIK, RIK The election was invalidated due to low turnout in the second round.

=== Local (City of Belgrade) ===
2000 Belgrade city election: Vračar Division 3
Candidate	Party
Filip Golubović (***WINNER***)	Democratic Opposition of Serbia–Dr. Vojislav Koštunica (Affiliation: Democratic Party of Serbia)
Natalija (Nataša) Đurić	United Pensioners Party
Radovan Ivić	Serbian Radical Party
Prof. Dr. Branislav Ivković (incumbent for New Belgrade)	Socialist Party of Serbia–Yugoslav Left–Slobodan Milošević (Affiliation: Socialist Party of Serbia)
Prof. Spasoje Krunić (incumbent)	Serbian Renewal Movement
Dragiša Mladenović	Citizens' Group: Kalenić
Jovan Pantić	Citizens' Group: Association of Foreign Currency and Dinar Savers
Total

1996 Belgrade city election: New Belgrade Division 4 (second and third rounds)
Candidate	Party
Branislav Ivković (***WINNER***)	Socialist Party of Serbia–Yugoslav Left (Affiliation: Socialist Party of Serbia)
Dragoslav Rosić	Coalition Together
Total
