= Karić =

Karić (Serbian Cyrillic: Карић) is a surname of South Slavic origins.

Notable people with the surname include:

- Amir Karić (born 1973), Slovenian footballer
- Ana Karić (1941–2014), Croatian actress
- Benjamina Karić (born 1991), Bosnian politician
- Bogoljub Karić (born 1954), Serbian businessman and politician
- Denis Karić (born 1972), Bosnian footballer
- Dragomir Karić (born 1949), Serbian entrepreneur and politician, brother of Bogoljub Karić
- Emir Karic (born 1997), Bosnian footballer
- Enes Karić (born 1958), Bosnian Islamic scholar
- Elena Karaman Karić (born 1971), Serbian interior designer
- Ivan Karić (born 1975), Serbian politician
- Mahir Karić (born 1992), Bosnian footballer
- Milanka Karić (born 1957), Serbian politician, wife of Bogoljub Karić
- Nermin Karić (born 1999), Swedish footballer
- Pol Popovic Karic (born 1962), Serbian-Spanish professor
- Sven Karič (born 1998), Slovenian footballer, son of Amir Karić
- Vedad Karic (born 1988), Bosnian mountain biker and road cyclist
- Veldin Karić (born 1974), Croatian footballer
- Velimir Karić (1859–1946), Serbian revolutionary
- Vladimir Karić (1848–1894), Serbian geographer, pedagogue, publicist and diplomat
- Zoran Karić (born 1961), Serbian footballer
