= Dragoljub Kojčić =

Serbian politician, administrator, author, and political analyst

Dragoljub Kojčić (Serbian Cyrillic: Драгољуб Којчић; born 27 March 1954) is a Serbian politician, administrator, author, and political analyst. He was the leader of the Serb Democratic Party of Serbia (SDSS) from 1997 to 2003, a deputy minister in the transitional government after the fall of Slobodan Milošević in 2000, and a member of the Serbian parliament from 2004 to 2007, serving with the Democratic Party of Serbia (DSS). He has written extensively on Serbian history and politics and is a frequent commentator in the Serbian media.

== Early life and career ==
Kojčić was born in Belgrade, in what was then the People's Republic of Serbia in the Federal People's Republic of Yugoslavia. As a student at the First Belgrade Gymnasium in 1971, he and some of his friends grew their hair out in the spirit of the era's counter-culture. When the school's principal told them not to return until they cut their hair, they went to the offices of Politika to plead their case in the national media. Although the principal later threatened them with expulsion, they received letters of support from throughout Yugoslavia and were reportedly protected by Ivica Račan, at the time a leading figure in the League of Communists.

Kojčić is a graduate of the University of Belgrade Faculty of Philosophy. He was one of the founders of the journal Država in 1990 and was its editor-in-chief in 1996–97. He has also been an editor for the Serbian Literary Gazette (Srpski književni glasnik) and has served on the editorial board of Zenit. His interests extend to areas including music, the visual arts, film, and the history of religion.

== Political career ==
=== Early years ===
Kojčić joined the People's Radical Party (NRS) after the re-introduction of multi-party politics to Serbia in 1990. He sought election for Stari Grad's second constituency in the 1990 Serbian parliamentary election and was not successful. Serbia afterward introduced a system of proportional representation for parliamentary elections, and in the December 1992 vote Kojčić led the electoral list of Blažo Perović's Democratic Fatherland Coalition in the Belgrade constituency. The list did not cross the electoral threshold for assembly representation.

=== Serb Democratic Party of Serbia ===
In 1997, Kojčić became the leader of the Serb Democratic Party of Serbia. This party had connections to the Serb Democratic Party of Bosnia and Herzegovina, although unlike that party it was a relatively minor force in the political culture of the region.

Kojčić signed a petition in late 1997 calling for the International Criminal Tribunal for the former Yugoslavia (ICTY) to suspend its proceedings against former Bosnian SDS leader Radovan Karadžić. In the same period, he travelled to Pale in the Republika Srpska to protest against the closure of the nationalist Serb Radio and Television outlet by the North Atlantic Treaty Organization (NATO).

He criticized the Serbian government's decision to hold a referendum on foreign mediation in Kosovo in April 1998, arguing that government was seeking to shift the burden of its own policy failures to the Serbian public.

In June 1998, Kojčić made a guest appearance at a convention of the Democratic Party of Serbia.

Kojčić's early years as leader of the Serb Democratic Party of Serbia coincided with a period when the Serbian National Renewal (SNO) movement was a constituent part of the organization. In the late 1990s, SNO leader Mirko Jović negotiated with Democratic Party (DS) leader Zoran Đinđić to bring the SDSS into Đinđić's "Alliance for Change," a coalition of parties opposed to the continued rule of Slobodan Milošević and the Socialist Party of Serbia (SPS). Jović has said that the main board of the SDSS voted to join the Alliance for Change but that Kojčić refused to implement the decision, leading to a party split and the departure of the SNO.

After the fall of Slobodan Milošević in October 2000, a transitional government was established comprising the Socialist Party of Serbia, the Serbian Renewal Movement (SPO), and the Democratic Opposition of Serbia (DOS). Kojčić was appointed as deputy minister of relations with Serbs outside Serbia], a role he held until a new government was formed in January 2001.

Serbia's electoral laws were reformed again in late 2000, such that the entire country because a single electoral division and all mandates were assigned to candidates on successful lists at the discretion of the sponsoring parties and coalitions, irrespective of numerical order.

=== Democratic Party of Serbia ===
In November 2003, the Democratic Party of Serbia announced that Kojčić would appear on its electoral list as a representative of the SDSS in the 2003 Serbian parliamentary election. Kojčić ultimately appeared in the thirty-first position on the list and was given a mandate when the list won fifty-three seats. The SDSS appears to have dissolved soon after the election, and Kojčić served afterward in the national assembly as a member of the DSS. In November 2004, he was elected as a member of the DSS's main board.

The DSS became the dominant party in Serbia's coalition government after the 2003 election. Kojčić was a government supporter and served on the foreign affairs committee and the committee on relations with Serbs outside Serbia.

His relationship with the DSS leadership deteriorated over the course of his parliamentary term. Kojčić angrily denied reports that he had negotiated with Bogoljub Karić to join the Strength of Serbia Movement (PSS) in 2005, but he made no secret of his dissatisfaction with the DSS, saying, "It would be useful for the party for me to be vice president, but I am a nuisance to those who are afraid of my professional authority and competence." He was appointed as the leader of the DSS's political council after this time. He was ultimately not included in party's 2007 electoral list, and his parliamentary tenure ended in that year.

=== New Serbia ===
In August 2007, Kojčić left the Democratic Party of Serbia to join New Serbia (NS). He was quoted as saying, "I simply did not have room for political activity in the DSS, I am not interested in positions, but I want to be actively involved in politics, and I will be able to do that in New Serbia [...] the programs are similar, so I have not changed my political beliefs." On joining New Serbia, he was appointed as the leader of its political council.

New Serbia was generally an ally of the Democratic Party of Serbia in this period, and the two parties ran a combined list in the 2008 Serbian parliamentary election. Kojčić appeared on the list in the 133rd position and was not chosen for a new assembly mandate when the list won thirty seats. The overall results of the election were inconclusive, but the DS-led For a European Serbia (ZES) alliance ultimately formed a coalition government with the Socialist Party, and the DSS and New Serbia went into opposition. Kojčić left New Serbia after this time.

=== Attempts to start a new political party ===
Beginning in 2009, Kojčić attempted to start a new party with other former members of the DSS. He released a book of political philosophy entitled The Arrow of Time and the Horizon of Freedom (Strela vremena i horizont slobode), outlining a vision of national conservatism that also favoured Serbia's entry into the European Union (EU). His project was originally called "Serbia 21" and later became known as the "New Deal for Serbia" (Novi dogovor za Srbiju).

Kojčić briefly joined the newly formed Rich Serbia (BS) party at the conclusion of these efforts, although this arrangement did not last very long.

=== Serbian Progressive Party ===
Kojčić joined the Serbian Progressive Party (SNS) in December 2011, describing the party as providing the right framework for Serbia to solve its fundamental political problems.

Serbia's electoral system was once again reformed in 2011, such that all assembly mandates were awarded to candidates on successful lists in numerical order. Kojčić appeared in the 107th position on the SNS's Let's Get Serbia Moving electoral list in the 2012 Serbian parliamentary election. The list won seventy-three seats, and he was not elected. The SNS formed a new coalition government with the Socialist Party after the election and has dominated the political life of Serbia since this time.

== Since 2012 ==
In early March 2013, Kojčić was appointed as acting director of Serbia's Institute for Textbooks. He remained in this role until his retirement in September 2019.

Kojčić remains a prolific writer and commentator on political matters in Serbia. In a 2019 article entitled, "Serbia Still Has its Mission Today," he argued that the European Union countries betrayed their founding constitutional principles by participating in the 1999 NATO bombing of Yugoslavia that ended the Kosovo War and ultimately led to Kosovo's unilateral declaration of independence from Serbia in 2008. He wrote, "Why does the Europe of Locke, Rousseau and Mill give up the principles on which it was created and side with the terrorist KLA and the self-proclaimed and false state of Kosovo, and against Serbia, which in its history has Dušan's Code, the Sretenjski Constitution and a contribution to the liberation of the world in two world wars[?]"

He supported a 2021 initiative for Serbia to produce more textbooks domestically rather than becoming dependent on books produced in Germany, saying that this would ensure a proper consideration of key events in Serbian history. "I expect that, for example, [...] Jasenovac will not be reduced to three or four sentences, as was the case in some textbooks, but that it will take up as much space as is proportionate to its national importance," he said.

Kojčić wrote in 2024 that Kosovo Serbs were living under conditions of apartheid under Priština's authority.

== Books published ==
- Strela vremena i horizont slobode (2009)
- Damjan Đakov – Streets and Colors of Time (2015)
- Bez buđenja: eseji i druge forme (2021)

== Electoral record ==
=== National Assembly of Serbia ===
1990 Serbian parliamentary election: Member for Stari Grad II
Candidate	Party
Borivoje Borović	Serbian Renewal Movement
Zoran Gluščević	Party of Independent Entrepreneurs and Peasants
Ratko Ilić	New Democracy–Movement for Serbia
Dragoljub Kojčić	People's Radical Party
Čedomir Maljković	Party of Yugoslavs
Dr. Dragoljub Mićunović (***WINNER***)	Democratic Party
Mr. (Note: Note: In this context, "Mr." stands for "Master" and refers to the candidate's academic credentials.) Iztok Race	Green Party
Dr. Slobodan Samardžić	Democratic Forum
Andreja Spasić	Serb Democratic Party
Milan Minja Subota	Citizens' Group
Dr. Milorad Unković	Socialist Party of Serbia
Lazar Šećerović	Serbian National Renewal
Slobodan Šoškić	Union of Reform Forces of Yugoslavia
Total
