= Branče Stojanović =

Serbian politician

Branče Stojanović (Serbian Cyrillic: Бранче Стојановић; born 4 October 1957) is a Serbian politician. He served in the National Assembly of Serbia from 2004 to 2007, was the president of the Smederevo city assembly from 2010 to 2016, and has been the deputy president of the city assembly since 2016. Stojanović is a member of the Socialist Party of Serbia (Socijalistička partija Srbije, SPS).

== Early life and career ==
Stojanović was born in the village of Kolari, in the Smederevo municipality of what was then the People's Republic of Serbia, Federal People's Republic of Yugoslavia. He was raised in the community and later graduated from the University of Belgrade's Faculty of Science and Mathematics. He worked at the Institute of Agriculture in Smederevo, becoming head of the laboratory service. He was later the manager of the wine cellar Godomin in his home village from 1993 to 1996 and again beginning in 2002.

== Politician ==
=== Early years (1996–2004) ===
Stojanović was elected to the Smederevo city assembly in the 1996 Serbian local elections. The Socialists won a majority victory in the city, and he served as deputy president of the assembly for the term that followed.

He appeared in the 224th position (out of 250) on the Socialist Party's electoral list for the 2000 Serbian parliamentary election, which was held just after Slobodan Milošević's fall from power. The list won thirty-seven seats, and he was not included in his party's delegation. (From 2000 to 2011, Serbian parliamentary mandates were awarded to sponsoring parties or coalitions rather than individual candidates, and it was common practice for mandates to be assigned out of numerical order. Stojanović could have been given a mandate despite his low position on the list, which was in any event mostly alphabetical, but he was not.)

=== Parliamentarian (2004–07) ===
Stojanović received the 223rd position on the SPS's list (which was again mostly alphabetical) in the 2003 parliamentary election. The list won twenty-two seats, and on this occasion he was given a mandate. In the parliament that followed, the SPS provided outside support to Serbia's coalition government under prime minister Vojislav Koštunica. During his term in the assembly, Stojanović served on the committee for agriculture.

In the 2007 parliamentary election, he was given the 212th position on the SPS's list. The party fell to sixteen seats, and he was not given a mandate for a second term. He again appeared on the party's list in the 2008 election and again did not receive a mandate when the list won twenty seats.

Serbia's electoral laws were reformed in 2011, such that all mandates in elections determined by proportional representation were assigned to candidates on successful lists in numerical order. Stojanović appeared in the eighty-eighth position on the SPS's list in the 2012 parliamentary election and was not re-elected when the list won forty-four seats. He has not been a candidate for the national assembly since this time.

=== Local politics (2004–present) ===
Serbia briefly introduced the direct election of mayors in the 2004 Serbian local elections. Stojanović ran as the SPS's candidate in Smederevo and was defeated in the first round. He was, however, elected to the city assembly when the party won ten seats and afterward served as the party's assembly leader.

He appeared in the lead position on the SPS's list for Smederevo in the 2008 local elections and was re-elected when the list won seven seats. After the election, he was chosen as deputy president of the city assembly. In 2010, he was promoted to assembly president. He was re-elected to the assembly in the 2012 local elections and was again chosen as its president for the term that followed.

Stojanović again led the SPS's lists for Smederevo in the 2016 and 2020 local elections and was re-elected both times, when the lists won nine and twelve mandates, respectively. On each occasion, he was chosen afterward for a new term as deputy president of the assembly.

== Electoral record ==
=== Local (Smederevo) ===
2004 Municipality of Smederevo local election: Mayor of Smederevo
Candidate	Party	First round		Second round	
Candidate	Party	Votes	%	Votes	%
Jasna Avramović	Citizens' Group: Movement for Smederevo–Dr. Jasna Avramović			11,359	55.78
Dobrica Janković	Democratic Party–Boris Tadić			9,004	44.22
Ljubomir Kapsarev	G17 Plus–Miroljub Labus				
Slobodan Miladinović (incumbent)	Democratic Party of Serbia–Dr. Vojislav Koštunica				
Zoran Mišeljić	Strength of Serbia Movement–Bogoljub Karić				
Dobrivoje Petrović	Serbian Radical Party–Tomislav Nikolić				
Branče Stojanović	Socialist Party of Serbia				
Hranislav Virijević	People's Democratic Party–Dr. Slobodan Vuksanović				
other candidates					
Total				20,363	100.00
