= Olivera Nedeljković =

Serbian politician and entrepreneur

Olivera Karić Nedeljković (Serbian Cyrillic: Оливера Карић Недељковић; born 22 April 1959) is a politician and entrepreneur in Serbia. She is the younger sister of Bogoljub Karić and was elected to the National Assembly of Serbia in 2020 as a member of the latter's Strength of Serbia Movement.

== Early life and private career ==
Nedeljković was born in Peć, Kosovo and Mehotija, in what was then the People's Republic of Serbia in the Federal People's Republic of Yugoslavia. She co-founded Kosovouniverzum with her brothers in Peć in 1979 and worked with the company until 1987. She subsequently co-founded Karić Turist in Belgrade in 1989 and served as a director on its board. Nedeljković has also been active with her family's Braća Karić foundation and has worked in the private sector.

She pursued higher education as a mature student at the University of Belgrade Faculty of Commerce, attaining the title of Doctor of Economics. She has written academic works, including co-authoring the chapter, "Employing women in the western Balkans," in the volume, Women and Sustainability in Business: A Global Perspective (2017). She is also a painter and has had her work exhibited in cities such as Belgrade and Niš; her works feature themes related to spirituality and the Serbian Orthodox Church.

== Politician ==
=== Early candidacies ===
Nedeljković joined her brother Boguljub Karić's Strength of Serbia Movement on its founding in 2004 and appeared on the party's electoral list for the City Assembly of Belgrade in the 2004 Serbian local elections. The list won five mandates, and she was not selected for its delegation. She later appeared on the Strength of Serbia Movement's electoral lists for the 2007 and 2008 parliamentary elections.. In both instances, the list failed to cross the electoral threshold to win representation in the assembly.

The Strength of Serbia Movement subsequently joined an alliance led by the Serbian Progressive Party, and its candidates have appeared on the Progressive Party's electoral lists since then.

=== Municipal politics ===
Nedeljković appeared in the twenty-third position on the Progressive Party's coalition list for the City Assembly of Belgrade in the 2018 city election and was elected when the list won a majority victory with sixty-four mandates.

=== Parliamentarian ===
Nedeljković received the forty-eighth position on the Progressive Party's Aleksandar Vučić — For Our Children list in the 2020 parliamentary election and was elected when the list won a landslide victory with 188 out of 250 mandates. She serves with her brother Dragomir Karić, who has been a Strength of Serbia member of the national assembly since 2012.

She is a member of the assembly committee on the economy, regional development, trade, tourism, and energy; a deputy member of the culture and information committee and the committee on education, science, technological development, and the information society; the leader of Serbia's parliamentary friendship group with Kazakhstan; and a member of the friendship groups with Armenia, Austria, Azerbaijan, Belarus, Belgium, Bosnia and Herzegovina, Brazil, Bulgaria, Canada, China, Croatia, Cuba, Cyprus, the Czech Republic, Denmark, France, Georgia, Germany, Greece, India, Israel, Italy, Japan, Jordan, Kuwait, Latvia, Luxembourg, Malta, Mexico, Montenegro, the Netherlands, North Korea, Norway, Oman, Qatar, Romania, Russia, Slovenia, South Korea, Spain, Sweden, Switzerland, Tajikistan, Turkey, Turkmenistan, Ukraine, the United Arab Emirates, the United Kingdom, the United States of America, and Venezuela.
