= Dobrica Janković =

Serbian politician (1961–2014)

Dobrica Janković (Serbian Cyrillic: Добрица Јанковић; 14 August 1961–6 June 2014), also known as Boca, was a medical doctor and politician in Serbia. He served in the National Assembly of Serbia from 2004 to 2007 as a member of the Democratic Party (Demokratska stranka, DS).

== Early life and career ==
Janković was raised in Smederevo. He graduated from the University of Belgrade Faculty of Medicine in 1989 and completed his specialization in emergency medicine in 2001. He worked as a doctor at the Sveti Luka health center in Smederevo from 1989 until his death and at one time served as its director of emergency services.

One of his children is the singer Saška Janković.

== Politician ==
=== Local politics (1996–2003) ===
The DS participated in the Together (Zajedno) coalition in the 1996 Serbian local elections, and Janković was elected to the Smederevo city assembly as a Zajedno candidate. The Socialist Party of Serbia (Socijalistička partija Srbije, SPS) and its allies won the election, and Zajedno served in opposition. In 1998, Janković became president of the DS's municipal board in Smederevo and a member of the party's main board at the republic level.

In 2000, the DS joined a new coalition called the Democratic Opposition of Serbia (Demokratska opozicija Srbije, DOS), a broad and ideologically diverse group of parties opposed to Slobodan Milošević's administration. The DOS won a majority victory in Smederevo in the 2000 Serbian local elections. Janković was re-elected to the local assembly and was afterward chosen as its vice-president, a position that was at the time equivalent to deputy mayor.

=== Parliamentarian ===
Janković received the seventy-fourth position on the Democratic Party's electoral list in the 2003 Serbian parliamentary election. The list won thirty-seven seats, and he was not initially included in his party's assembly delegation. He was, however, given a mandate on 17 February 2004 as the replacement for another party member. (From 2000 to 2011, Serbian parliamentary mandates were awarded to sponsoring parties or coalitions rather than individual candidates, and it was common practice for the mandates to be assigned out of numerical order. Janković's list position had no specific bearing whether or when he received a mandate.) The DS served in opposition in the 2003–07 parliament. Janković was a member of the committee for health and family and the committee for Kosovo and Metohija.

On 5 March 2004, shortly after Janković's appointment to the national assembly, a change of government took place at the city level in Smederevo. The Democratic Party of Serbia (Demokratska stranka Srbije, DSS) formed a new administration with the SPS, and Janković was removed from his position as vice-president of the local assembly.

Serbia briefly introduced the direct election of mayors in the 2004 local elections. Janković was the DS's nominee for mayor in Smederevo and was defeated in the second round of voting by Jasna Avramović for the "Movement for Smederevo." He was re-elected in the concurrent election for the city assembly but resigned before his term was over.

Janković received the eighty-first position on the DS's list in the 2007 parliamentary election. The list won sixty-four seats, and he was not given a mandate for a second term.

== Death ==
Janković died on 6 June 2014 after a serious illness.

== Electoral record ==
=== Local (Smederevo) ===
2004 Municipality of Smederevo local election: Mayor of Smederevo
Candidate	Party	First round		Second round	
Candidate	Party	Votes	%	Votes	%
Jasna Avramović	Citizens' Group: Movement for Smederevo–Dr. Jasna Avramović			11,359	55.78
Dobrica Janković	Democratic Party–Boris Tadić			9,004	44.22
Ljubomir Kapsarev	G17 Plus–Miroljub Labus				
Slobodan Miladinović (incumbent)	Democratic Party of Serbia–Dr. Vojislav Koštunica				
Zoran Mišeljić	Strength of Serbia Movement–Bogoljub Karić				
Dobrivoje Petrović	Serbian Radical Party–Tomislav Nikolić				
Branče Stojanović	Socialist Party of Serbia				
Hranislav Virijević	People's Democratic Party–Dr. Slobodan Vuksanović				
other candidates					
Total				20,363	100.00
