= 2004 Serbian presidential election =

← 2003	13 June 2004 (first round); 27 June 2004 (second round)	2008 →
- Turnout: 48.35 (▲9.56 pp)
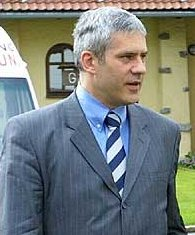

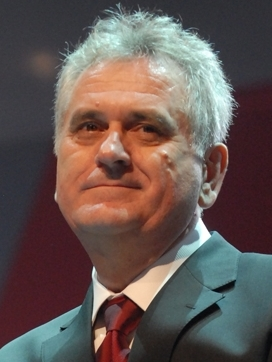
Candidate	Boris Tadić	Tomislav Nikolić
Party	DS	SRS
Popular vote	1,681,528	1,434,068
Percentage	53.97%	46.03%
- Results by district Tadić: 50–60% 60–70% 70–80% Nikolić 50–60% 60–70%
President before election
Predrag Marković (acting)
G17+
Elected President
Boris Tadić
DS

Presidential elections were held in the Republic of Serbia on Sunday, 13 June 2004. As no candidate received a majority of the vote, a second round was held on Sunday, 27 June. Boris Tadić, the pro-western Democratic Party's candidate, was the eventual victor with 54% of the vote.

== Candidates ==
- Boris Tadić, Democratic Party (advanced to second round)
- Tomislav Nikolić, Serbian Radical Party (advanced to second round)

- Dragan Maršićanin, Democratic Party of Serbia
- Bogoljub Karić, Strength of Serbia Movement
- Ivica Dačić, Socialist Party of Serbia
- Princess Elizabeth of Yugoslavia
- Vladan Batić, Democratic Christian Party of Serbia
- Borislav Pelević, Party of Serbian Unity
- Branislav Ivković, Socialist People's Party
- Zoran Milinković, Patriots of Serbian Diaspora
- Marijan Rističević, People's Peasant Party
- Ljiljana Aranđelović, United Serbia
- Dragan Đorđević, Party of Serbian Citizens
- Milovan Drecun, Serbian Revival
- Mirko Jović, People's Radical Party

The surprise of this election was the success shown by one of the wealthiest businessmen in Serbia, Bogoljub Karić. The Government's candidate, Dragan Maršićanin, finished in 4th place, which opened the question of new parliamentary elections in Serbia.

In the second round, the democratic candidate Boris Tadić gained the support of every government party as well as of Bogoljub Karić.

== Results ==
Candidate	Party	First round		Second round	
Candidate	Party	Votes	%	Votes	%
Tomislav Nikolić	Serbian Radical Party	954,339	30.97	1,434,068	46.03
Boris Tadić	Democratic Party	853,584	27.70	1,681,528	53.97
Bogoljub Karić	Citizens' Group	568,691	18.46		
Dragan Maršićanin	DSS–G17 Plus–SPO–NS	414,971	13.47		
Ivica Dačić	Socialist Party of Serbia	125,952	4.09		
Jelisaveta Karađorđević	Citizens' Group: Initiative for a More Beautiful Serbia	62,737	2.04		
Milovan Drecun	Serbian Revival	16,907	0.55		
Vladan Batić	Christian Democratic Party	16,795	0.55		
Borislav Pelević	Party of Serbian Unity	14,317	0.46		
Branislav Ivković	Socialist People's Party	13,980	0.45		
Ljiljana Aranđelović	United Serbia	11,796	0.38		
Marijan Rističević	People's Peasant Party	10,198	0.33		
Dragan Đorđević	Party of Serbian Citizens	5,785	0.19		
Mirko Jović	People's Radical Party, Serbia and Diaspora, European Blok	5,546	0.18		
Zoran Milinković	Patriotic Party of Diaspora	5,442	0.18		
Total		3,081,040	100.00	3,115,596	100.00
Valid votes		3,081,040	98.78	3,115,596	98.64
Invalid/blank votes		38,047	1.22	42,975	1.36
Total votes		3,119,087	100.00	3,158,571	100.00
Registered voters/turnout		6,532,263	47.75	6,532,940	48.35
Source: RIK
