= Dobričanin =

Dobričanin is a surname. Notable people with the surname include:

- Jugoslav Dobričanin (born 1956), Serbian politician
- Vladimir Dobričanin (born 1972), Montenegrin doctor and politician
