= Šerif Hamzagić =

Serbian medical doctor

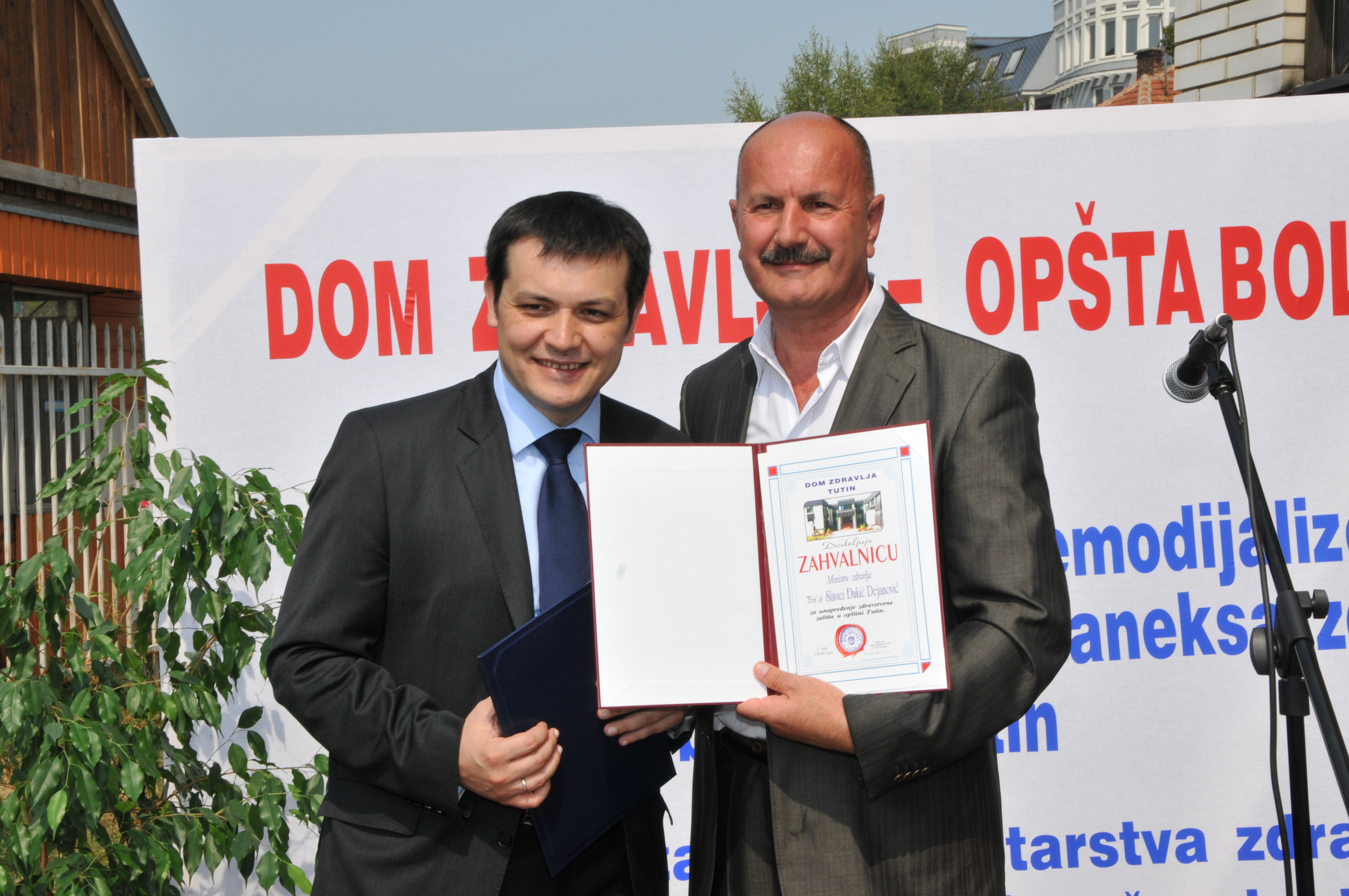

Šerif Hamzagić (Serbian Cyrillic: Шериф Хамзагић; born 31 May 1956) is a Serbian medical doctor, administrator, and politician from the country's Bosniak community. He served in the National Assembly of Serbia from 2008 to 2012 as a member of G17 Plus.

== Early life and career ==
Hamzagić was born in Tutin, in the Sandžak region of what was then the People's Republic of Serbia in the Federal People's Republic of Yugoslavia. His nineteenth-century ancestors were the founders of the community; a travelogue written in 1868 noted that there were seven houses in Tutin, six of which belonged to members of the Hamzagić family.

Hamzagić graduated from the University of Pristina Faculty of Medicine and began working at Tutin's Health Center in 1982, eventually becoming its director. In 1990, he completed his specialization in internal medicine in Belgrade.

In 2012, Hamzagić co-authored a historical monograph entitled, Tutin: Od mahale do šehera.

== Politician ==
Hamzagić was a member of Izudin Šušević's Reform Democratic Party of Sandžak in the 1990s. He appeared in the third position on the party's electoral list for the Kragujevac division in the 1993 Serbian parliamentary election; the list did not cross the electoral threshold for assembly representation.

He later joined G17 Plus and received the 238th position on the party's list for the 2003 Serbian parliamentary election. The list won thirty-four seats, and he did not receive a mandate. (From 2000 to 2011, Serbian parliamentary mandates were awarded to sponsoring parties or coalitions rather than to individual candidates, and it was common practice for mandates to be assigned out of numerical order. Hamzagić's position on the list – which was in any event mostly alphabetical – had no specific bearing on his chances of election.)

Serbia introduced the direct election of mayors in the 2004 Serbian local elections. Hamzagić ran for mayor of Tutin and finished third. He was elected to the municipal assembly when G17 Plus won two seats, although he resigned before the four-year term expired. He later appeared in the 236th position on G17 Plus's list in the 2007 Serbian parliamentary election and was not given a mandate when the list won nineteen seats.

=== Parliamentarian ===
G17 Plus contested the 2008 Serbian parliamentary election as part of the For a European Serbia (Za evropsku Srbiju, ZES) coalition, which was led by the Democratic Party (Demokratska stranka, DS). Hamzagić appeared in the 213th position on ZES's list and was awarded a mandate when the list won a plurality victory with 102 out of 250 seats. The overall result of the election was inconclusive, but ZES ultimately formed a coalition government with the Socialist Party of Serbia (Socijalistička partija Srbije, SPS), and Hamzagić served as a supporter of the administration. He was a member of the assembly committee for international relations and the parliamentary friendship group with Bosnia and Herzegovina.

=== Since 2012 ===
Serbia's electoral system was reformed in 2011, such that all mandates were assigned in numerical order to candidates on successful lists. G17 Plus contested the 2012 parliamentary election at the head of the United Regions of Serbia (Ujedinjeni regioni Srbije, URS) coalition. Hamzagić appeared on the list in the seventieth position; this was too low for election to be a realistic prospect, and he was not re-elected when the list won sixteen seats. He was elected to the Tutin municipal assembly when the URS won six seats and served for the term that followed.

== Electoral record ==
=== Municipal (Tutin) ===
2004 Municipality of Tutin local election: Mayor of Tutin
Candidate	Party	Votes	%
Šemsudin Kučević	List for Sandžak (Affiliation: Party of Democratic Action of Sandžak)	8,588	59.33
Mujo Muković	Sandžak Democratic Party	2,882	19.91
Šerif Hamzagić	G17 Plus	1,226	8.47
Sead Ademović	Strength of Serbia Movement	820	5.66
Mithat Eminović	People's Movement of Sandžak	809	5.59
Osman Bejtović	Citizens' Group	151	1.04
Total		14,476	100.00
