= Mujo Muković =

Serbian politician

Mujo Muković (Serbian Cyrillic: Мујо Муковић; born 15 August 1963) is a politician in Serbia from the country's Bosniak community. He has served four terms in the National Assembly of Serbia and was at one time a secretary of state in the country's government. For many years a prominent member of the Sandžak Democratic Party (Sandžačka demokratska partija, SDP), he founded the breakaway Bosniak People's Party (Bošnjačka Narodna Stranka, BNS) in 2012.

== Early life and private career ==
Muković was born in Tutin, in the Sandžak region of what was then the Socialist Republic of Serbia in the Socialist Federal Republic of Yugoslavia. A gifted student, he graduated from the University of Belgrade Faculty of Civil Engineering, acquiring the title of Bachelor of Civil Engineering - Master, and has worked in construction for the municipality of Tutin.

== Politics ==
After multi-party politics was re-introduced to Serbia in 1990, Muković became a member of Party of Democratic Action of Sandžak (Stranka demokratske akcije Sandžaka, SDA), which was at the time the only Bosniak party in Serbia. He left that party in 1996 to join the Sandžak Coalition, which in 2000 became the SDP. Muković was chosen as deputy leader of the latter group.

=== First parliamentary term (2001–04) ===
In 2000, the SDP became part of the Democratic Opposition of Serbia (Demokratska opozicija Srbije, DOS), a broad and ideologically diverse coalition of parties opposed to Slobodan Milošević's administration. Muković was the SDP's main representative on the DOS's electoral list in the 2000 Serbian parliamentary election, appearing in the seventeenth position. The list won a landslide victory with 176 out of 250 seats, and Muković was given a mandate when the new assembly convened in January 2001. (From 2000 to 2011, all mandates in Serbian parliamentary election were distributed to candidates on successful lists at the discretion of sponsoring parties or coalitions, irrespective of numerical order. Muković was not automatically elected by virtue of his list position but received a mandate all the same.) During his term, he was a member of the committee on inter-ethnic relations and the committee on constitutional affairs.

Early in his term, Muković credited the SDP with ensuring Serbia's recognition of Muslims [Bosniaks] as a nationality in the country's law on national minorities. In October 2001, he called for fair representation of Bosniaks in the Novi Pazar police department and for Sandžak policemen who had been fired under Milošević's regime to be given their jobs back; the following year, he accused the government on inaction on this front. He criticized's Serbia's new law on local self-administration in early 2002, saying that it provided only minor changes to the existing system.

In June 2002, Muković was one of nine Serbian parliamentarians appointed to a commission for drafting the constitutional charter of the planned State Union of Serbia and Montenegro. He described the appointment as an important step for Bosniaks and for the Sandžak region. At one stage, the SDP threatened to resign from the commission on the grounds that the proposed draft did not provide adequate guarantees on human and minority rights; ultimately, however, Muković remained a member and supported the final document. He later served on a similar commission for Serbia at the republic level, although he quit the group after the SDP's minimum demands were not met.

Muković announced in August 2002 that the SDP would support Miroljub Labus's candidacy in the following month's Serbian presidential election. The election was ultimately invalidated due to low turnout.

The SDP contested the 2003 Serbian parliamentary election as part of the Together for Tolerance (Zajedno za toleranciju, ZZT) alliance, and Muković appeared in the 140th position on a list that was mostly alphabetical. The list failed to cross the electoral threshold, and his first term in the assembly ended in January 2004.

Serbia briefly introduced the direct election of mayors for the 2004 Serbian local elections. Muković ran as the SDP's candidate in Tutin and was defeated.

=== Second parliamentary term and Secretary of State (2007–2011) ===
For the 2007 parliamentary election, the SDP joined the electoral list of the Democratic Party (Demokratska stranka, DS). Muković appeared on the list and was given a mandate for a second term when the DS alliance won sixty-four seats. In the immediate aftermath of the 2007 election, Tomislav Nikolić of the far-right Serbian Radical Party (Srpska radikalna stranka, SRS) was elected as speaker of the assembly. The SDP delegates boycotted the vote; Muković later accused some political parties "hitherto ... of the democratic bloc, at least on paper," of permitting Nikolić's election to occur. The DS ultimately formed a coalition government with the rival Democratic Party of Serbia (Demokratska stranka Srbije, DSS) and G17 Plus, and Muković served as an administration supporter.

Muković was a member of the assembly's defense and security committee during his second term; in this capacity, he sought the removal of the Mehov Krš security checkpoint between Serbia and Montenegro (which had declared independence in 2006), on the grounds that local residents were required to cross the border on a daily basis. He also served on the committee on interethnic relations and the committee on urbanism and construction.

The DS–DSS coalition fell apart in early 2008, and a new parliamentary election was held in May of that year. Muković appeared on the DS's For a European Serbia (Za evropsku Srbiju, ZES) list, which won 102 seats. He was not given a mandate for a third term but was later appointed as a secretary of state in Serbia's ministry of infrastructure.

In June 2009, Muković indicated that the SDP would support Serbia's regional development bill if the municipalities of the Sandžak were included as a single region.

=== Departure from the SDP and return to parliament (2011–16) ===
Muković announced his resignation from the SDP in February 2011, accusing the party of failing to take responsibility for its recent defeat in elections for the Bosniak National Council and of losing its relevance in the Sandžak. He also resigned as a secretary of state, saying that Serbia's government was enacting a discriminatory policy toward Bosniaks and the Sandžak region. He later established a new political movement, which was formally established as the Bosniak People's Party in January 2012. He was elected as the party's president at its founding convention.

The BNS contested the 2012 Serbian parliamentary election as part of the Let's Get Serbia Moving alliance led by the Serbian Progressive Party (Srpska napredna stranka, SNS). Serbia's electoral laws had been reformed in 2011, such that mandates were awarded in numerical order to candidates on successful lists; Muković was given the twentieth position on the SNS list and was elected to a third assembly term when the list won seventy-three seats. The SNS formed a coalition with the Socialist Party of Serbia (Socijalistička partija Srbije, SPS) and other parties after the election, and Muković again served as a government supporter. He was a member of the assembly's committee on spatial planning, transport, infrastructure, and telecommunications; a deputy member of the committee on economy, regional development, trade, tourism, and energy; the leader of Serbia's parliamentary friendship group with Bosnia and Herzegovina; and a member of the friendship groups with Iran, Luxembourg, and Turkey.

He received the forty-seventh position on the SNS's list in the 2014 parliamentary election and was re-elected when the list won a majority victory with 158 seats. He remained a member of the spatial planning committee; served on the committee on labour, social affairs, social inclusion, and poverty reduction; was a deputy member of the committee on constitutional affairs and legislation; headed Serbia's parliamentary friendship group with Iraq; and was a member of the friendship groups with Bosnia and Herzegovina, Germany, Luxembourg, Montenegro, and Turkey.

He was not a candidate in the 2016 parliamentary election. He appeared in the second position on the BNS's list for the Tutin municipal assembly in the concurrent 2016 local elections; the list did not cross the threshold to win assembly representation.

== Electoral record ==
=== Municipal (Tutin) ===
2004 Municipality of Tutin local election: Mayor of Tutin
Candidate	Party	Votes	%
Šemsudin Kučević	List for Sandžak (Affiliation: Party of Democratic Action of Sandžak)	8,588	59.33
Mujo Muković	Sandžak Democratic Party	2,882	19.91
Šerif Hamzagić	G17 Plus	1,226	8.47
Sead Ademović	Strength of Serbia Movement	820	5.66
Mithat Eminović	People's Movement of Sandžak	809	5.59
Osman Bejtović	Citizens' Group	151	1.04
Total		14,476	100.00
