= Dobrica (given name) =

Dobrica is a Serbian masculine given name. Notable people with the name include:

- Dobrica Ćosić (1921–2014), Yugoslav and Serbian politician
- Dobrica Erić (1936–2019), Serbian writer
- Dobrica Janković (1961–2014), Serbian politician
- Dobrica Matković (1887–1973), Serbian soldier and politician
- Dobrica Milutinović (1880–1956), Serbian actor
- Dobrica Veselinović (born 1981), Serbian politician
