= 2008 Serbian presidential election =

- January 20, 2008 (first round); February 3, 2008 (second round)
- Turnout: 68.12% (▲19.77 pp)
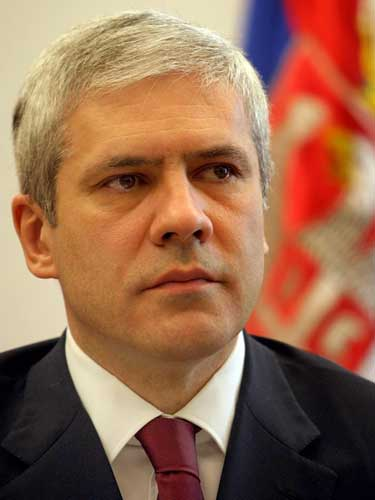

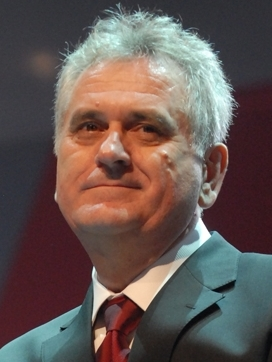
Candidate	Boris Tadić	Tomislav Nikolić
Party	DS	SRS
Popular vote	2,304,467	2,197,155
Percentage	50.31%	47.97%
- Tomislav Nikolić Boris Tadić Velimir Ilić Milutin Mrkonjić István Pásztor Election not held Boris Tadić Tomislav Nikolić Election not held
President before election
Boris Tadić
DS
Elected President
Boris Tadić
DS

Presidential elections were held in Serbia on January 20 and February 3, 2008. Incumbent President Boris Tadić was re-elected as president in the second round with 51% of the vote, defeating challenger Tomislav Nikolić.

The elections for president were the first since Serbia became independent, when the State Union of Serbia and Montenegro was dissolved by the secession of Montenegro in 2006. The first round of elections was held on January 20, 2008, when none of the candidates secured an absolute majority of the votes cast. Thus a run-off election took place on February 3, 2008, between Tomislav Nikolić of the Serbian Radical Party (SRS) and Boris Tadić of the Democratic Party (DS) (the incumbent president) who finished first and second respectively in the first round. 6,708,697 registered voters were able to vote, which was around 50,000 more since the parliamentary election held in the beginning of 2007, on 8,481 electoral posts across Serbia and 65 in 36 foreign countries. Of that figure, 37,053 are abroad, 9,187 in military service and 8,201 in prison. Persons residing in Montenegro with Serbian citizenship were also allowed to vote in seven Montenegrin towns: Podgorica, Berane, Herceg Novi, Budva, Tivat, Sutomore and Andrijevica.

A re-vote of the second round was held in Dobro Polje due to some irregularities on 12 February 2008. Tadić was sworn in for his second term on 15 February 2008.

== Background ==
The previous session of the National Assembly of the Republic of Serbia adopted a Constitutional Law on 10 November 2006 that proclaimed the new Constitution. As per it, parliamentary Speaker Oliver Dulić was to schedule the election by 31 December 2007 or 60 days after the new laws regarding the president of the republic, presidential elections, defense, the military, foreign affairs and the security services are passed. Five of the six necessary laws on presidential elections were passed by the parliamentary majority on 11 December 2007.

On 12 December 2007 Dulić had scheduled the first round of election for January 20 and second round for February 3, 2008. The Electoral Commission of the Republic of Serbia declared that candidates were due to apply on December 30, 2007, the latest, submitting 10,000 signatures.

The Organization for Security and Co-operation in Europe (OSCE) and Commonwealth of Independent States were the nationwide neutral observer of the election, including several British and American observers.

Two parties representing the Albanians from Preševo Valley, the Democratic Union of the Valley and the Party of Democratic Action called for Albanians from outside Kosovo to participate in the election.

== Candidates ==
=== First round ===
Candidates
Tomislav Nikolić of SRS	Serbian Radical Party, has nominated Tomislav Nikolić (Томислав Николић); Supported by: Vlach Party, Vlachs of Democratic Serbia, Democratic Community of Serbian Vlachs and Movement "I live for the Frontier"; Slogan: With All Heart (Свим срцем)
Jugoslav Dobričanin of RS	Reformist Party, has nominated Jugoslav Dobričanin (Југослав Добричанин). Slogan: Power of the south (Снага југа)
Boris Tadić of DS	Democratic Party has nominated Boris Tadić (Борис Тадић), current President of Serbia. Supported by: G17 Plus, League of Social Democrats of Vojvodina, Sanjak Democratic Party, Civic Initiative of Gora, Roma Union of Serbia, Reformists of Vojvodina, Serbian List for Kosovo and Metohija. Slogan: For a Strong and Stable Serbia (За јаку и стабилну Србију)
Velimir Ilić of NS	New Serbia, has nominated Velimir "Velja" Ilić (Велимир "Веља" Илић). Supported by: Democratic Party of Serbia, United Serbia, Serbian Renewal Movement and List for Sandžak. Slogan: Serbia rules! (Србија је закон!); Choose Serbia! (Изабери Србију!)
István Pásztor of Hungarian Coalition	Hungarian Coalition (Magyar Koalíció - Mađarska koalicija) (Alliance of Vojvodina Hungarians, Democratic Fellowship of Vojvodina Hungarians, Democratic Party of Vojvodina Hungarians and Hungarian Civic Alliance), has nominated István Pásztor. Pásztor is supported by the Montenegrin Society of Serbia "The Crusader". He has announced his support for Boris Tadić in the second round. Slogan: Za Srbiju u kojoj je svima nama dobro! - Olyan Szerbiáért, ahol nekünk is jó!
Marijan Rističević of NSS	Coalition People's Peasant Party - United Peasant Party, has nominated Marijan Rističević (Маријан Ристичевић).
Čedomir Jovanović of LDP	Liberal Democratic Party, has nominated Čedomir "Čeda" Jovanović (Чедомир "Чеда" Јовановић). Supported by: Social Democratic Union, Christian Democratic Party of Serbia, Croatian Bunjevac-Šokac Party and Vojvodina Party. Slogan: Life rules! (Живот је закон!)
Milutin Mrkonjić of SPS	Socialist Party of Serbia, has nominated Milutin Mrkonjić (Милутин Мркоњић). Supported by: Party of United Pensioners of Serbia. Slogan: Achievements speak for themselves (Дела говоре);Our Comrade! (Наш друг!)
Milanka Karić of PSS	Strength of Serbia Movement - Bogoljub Karić, has nominated Milanka Mara Karić (Миланка Мара Карић) after failed attempt to nominate her husband and party leader Bogoljub Karić, who is under arrest warrant. Slogan: Family is the strength of Serbia (Породица је снага Србије.)

=== Second round ===
Candidates
Tomislav Nikolić of SRS	Serbian Radical Party has nominated Tomislav Nikolić (Томислав Николић); Supported by: Vlach Party, Vlachs of Democratic Serbia, Democratic Community of Serbian Vlachs, Yugoslav Left, Democratic Community of Serbia, People's Peasant Party, United Peasant Party, New Communist Party of Yugoslavia, National Movement Serbia, Serbian Party of Socialists, Nacionalni stroj, Serbian National Council of North Kosovo, Movement "I live for the Frontier"; Slogan: With All Heart (Свим срцем)
Boris Tadić of DS	Main article: Boris Tadić reelection campaign, 2008 Democratic Party has nominated Boris Tadić (Борис Тадић), current President of Serbia. Supported by: G17 Plus, League of Social Democrats of Vojvodina, Alliance of Vojvodina Hungarians, Democratic Fellowship of Vojvodina Hungarians, Democratic Party of Vojvodina Hungarians, Hungarian Civic Alliance, Sanjak Democratic Party, List for Sanjak, Civic Initiative of Gora, Roma Union of Serbia, Democratic League of Croats in Vojvodina, Reformists of Vojvodina, Democratic Union of Croats, Democratic Movement of Serbian Romanians, Serbian List for Kosovo and Metohija, European Movement of Serbia, Serbian Renewal Movement, Social Democratic Union, Christian Democratic Party of Serbia, Vojvodina Party, Independent Democratic Serbian Party, Alliance of Independent Social Democrats, Democratic Party of Bulgarians, Union of Socialists of Vojvodina, Social Democratic Party, Democratic Party of Serbs Green party Eko, National Movement of Sandžak, Association of Free and Independent Trade Unions, Federation of Nongovernmental Organizations of Serbia, Coalition "Together for Kragujevac", Serbian National Council of Kosovo and Metohija, Grand Production and National Councils of Slovak, Roma, Macedonian, Romanian and Rusyn national minorities. Slogan: Let's conquer Europe together! (Да освојимо Европу заједно!)

== Campaign and issues ==
After it was determined that the two-candidate runoff would consist of Tadić and Nikolić, the period after the first round voting converged on Serbia's accession to the European Union, the status of Kosovo in Serbia's constitution, and various social issues.

On January 30, 2008, Tadić and Nikolić participated in a televised debate conducted by RTS. Tadić emphasized Serbia's accession process to the European Union, whereas Nikolić stated that Serbia needed to cooperate with both the EU and Russia. Tadić and Nikolić exchanged accusations on each of their own stances regarding the European Union. Tadić criticized Nikolić's Serbian Radical Party for its eurosceptic history, after which Nikolić said that "Serbia will never be a Russian governorate, but also never a European colony." They both shared similar concerns for corruption, poverty, and both candidates told the audience that Kosovo is an integral part of Serbia. However, Nikolić stated in the debate that Kosovo "will declare independence as soon as the presidential election is finished." Just over a month later, Kosovo unilaterally declared independence from Serbia.

== Forecasting ==
Polling Firm	Date	Source	Tadić	Nikolić	Jovanović	Ilić	Mrkonjić	Second round
CeSID	June 2007		14	10				
CeSID	early 2007		12	9	3			
Strategic Marketing	October 2007		24	18		4		
Strategic Marketing	late 2007		38	23	3			Tadić 52 Nikolić 48
Angus Reid	November 7, 2007		35	31	2			Tadić 56 Nikolić 44
Factor Plus	12 December 2007		36.5	31.8	8.5	6		
CeSID	10 January 2008		19	21	3	4	4	Tadić 33 Nikolić 27
Glasaj za	12 January 2008		22.4	29.5	17.8	3.6	16.9	
CeSID	24–28 January 2008							Tadić 51.1%, Nikolić 48.9%
CeSID	30 January 2008							Tadić 2.10-2.35 million voters Nikolić 2.00-2.25 million voters

== Results ==
Candidate	Party	First round		Second round	
Candidate	Party	Votes	%	Votes	%
Tomislav Nikolić	Serbian Radical Party	1,646,172	40.76	2,197,155	48.81
Boris Tadić	Democratic Party	1,457,030	36.08	2,304,467	51.19
Velimir Ilić	New Serbia–DSS–SPO	305,828	7.57		
Milutin Mrkonjić	Socialist Party of Serbia	245,889	6.09		
Čedomir Jovanović	Liberal Democratic Party	219,689	5.44		
István Pásztor	Hungarian Coalition	93,039	2.30		
Milanka Karić	Strength of Serbia Movement	40,332	1.00		
Marijan Rističević	People's Peasant Party	18,500	0.46		
Jugoslav Dobričanin	Reformist Party	11,894	0.29		
Total		4,038,373	100.00	4,501,622	100.00
Valid votes		4,038,373	98.09	4,501,622	98.28
Invalid/blank votes		78,462	1.91	78,806	1.72
Total votes		4,116,835	100.00	4,580,428	100.00
Registered voters/turnout		6,708,697	61.37	6,723,762	68.12
Source: CESID

== Gallery ==
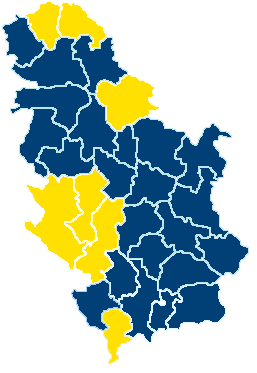
First round results by district

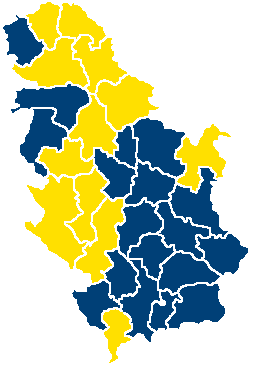
Second round results by district

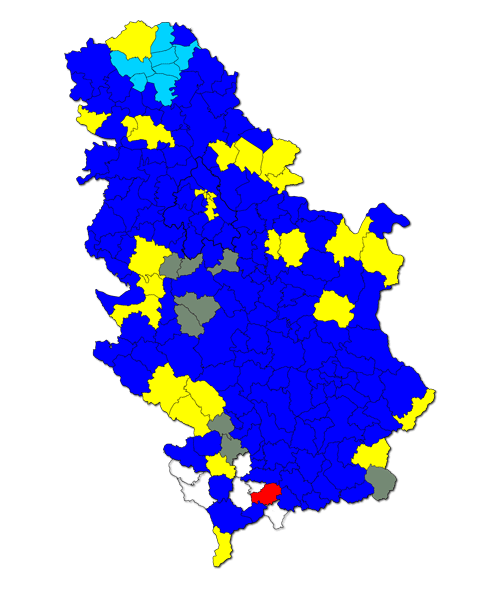
Leading candidate by municipality (first round)

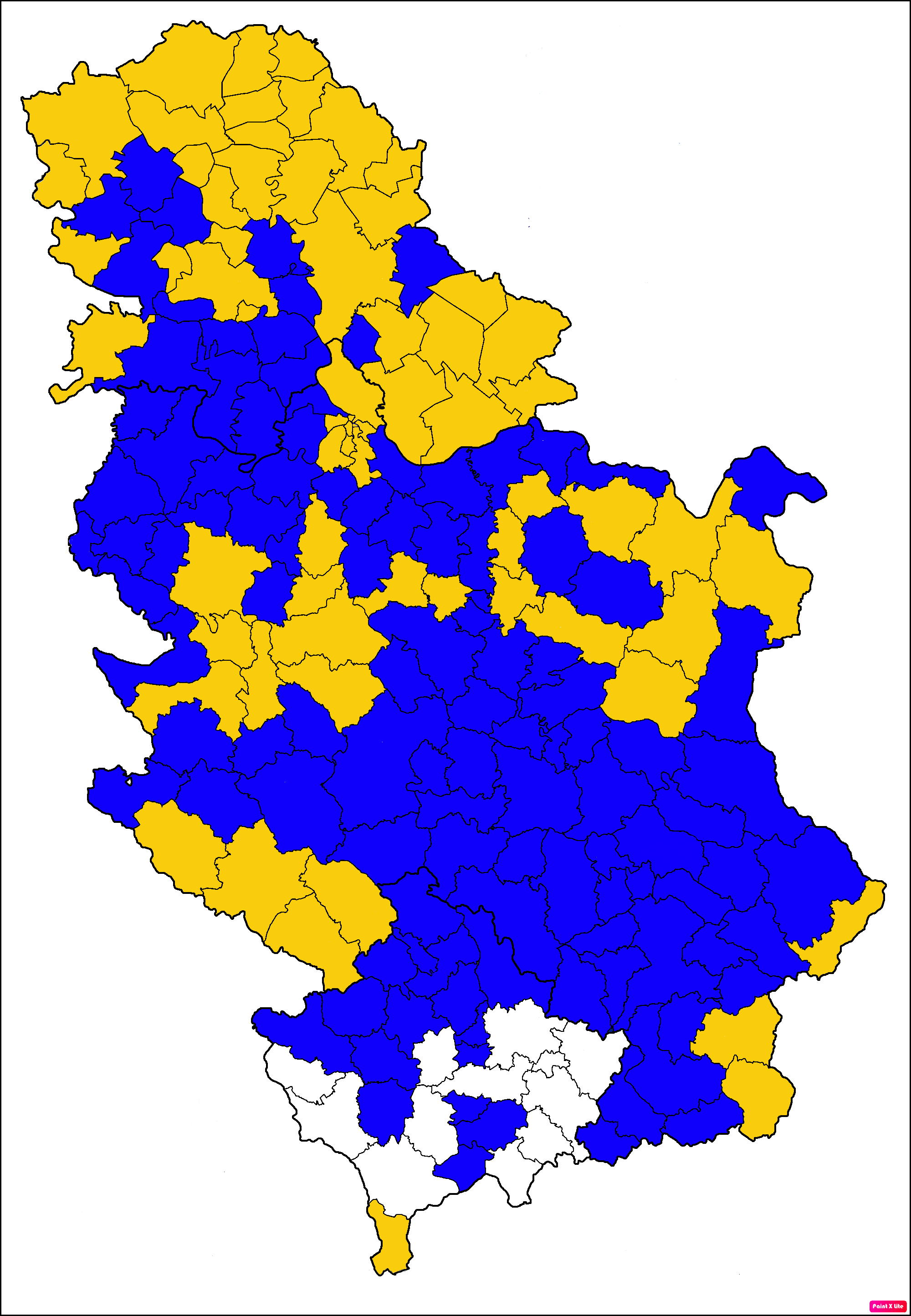
Leading candidate by municipality (second round)

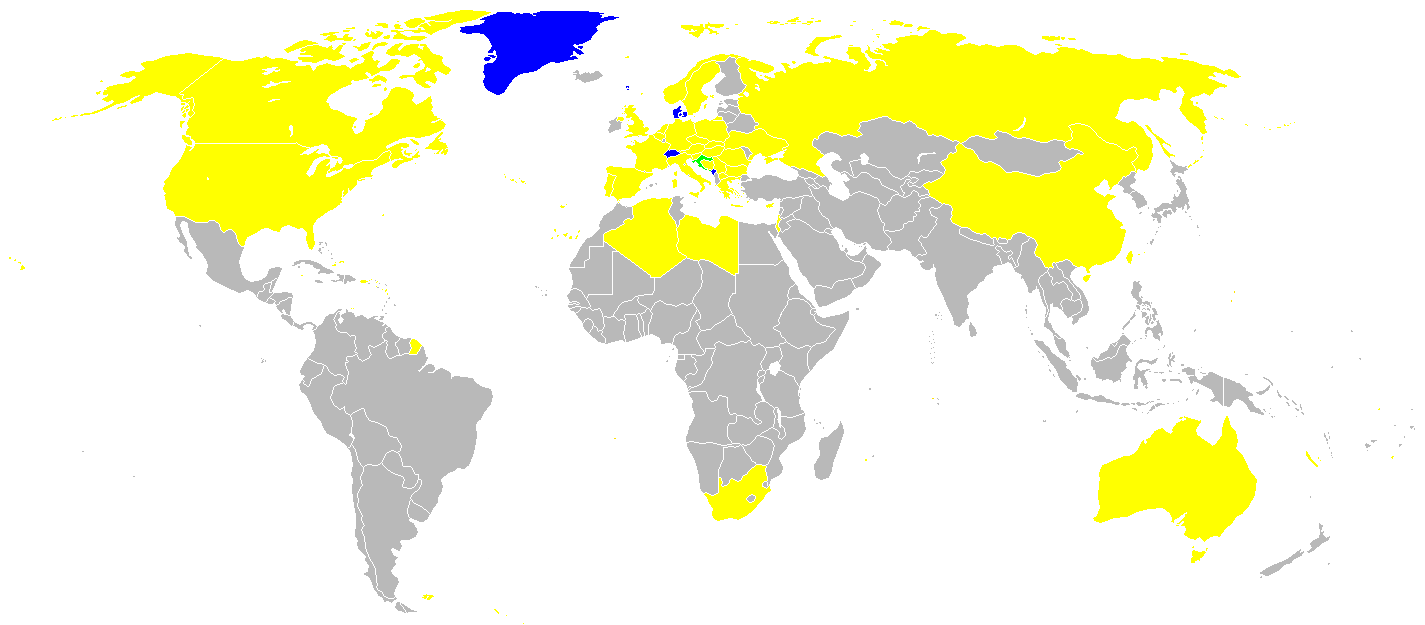
Results by country (second round)

== International reactions ==
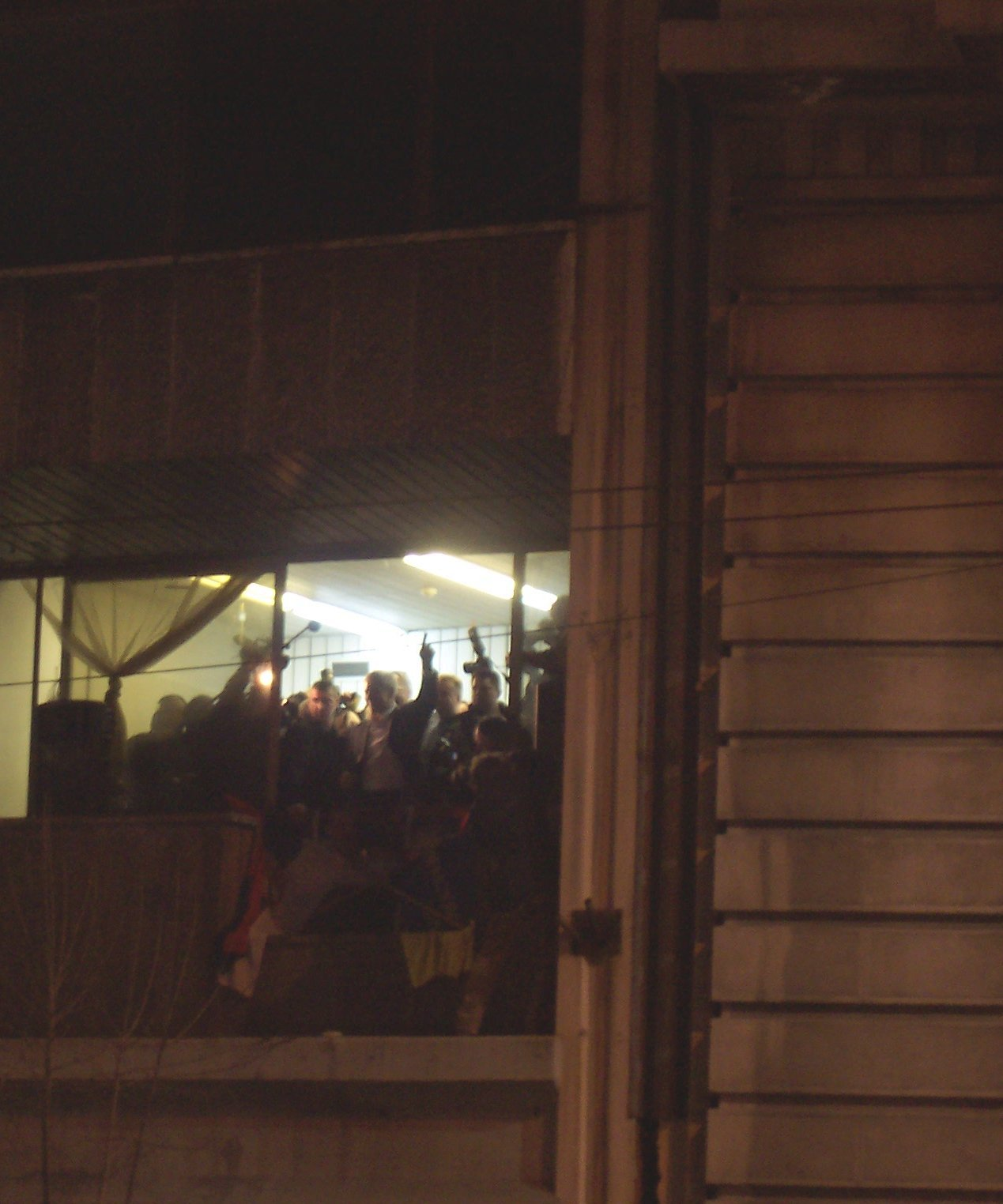
Boris Tadić gives a speech after his victory was announced.

- Austria - Heinz Fischer, President of Austria, congratulated Tadić and stated "I am absolutely convinced that your reelection will strengthen pro-European course of Serbia". Alfred Gusenbauer, Chancellor of Austria, said that "reelection of Boris Tadić is a clear signal that the people of Serbia see their future in the EU". Austrian Foreign Minister Ursula Plassnik praised the re-election of Tadić as a decision to keep moving towards the EU, "The people of Serbia have given a European vote of confidence".
- Bosnia and Herzegovina - Republika Srpska Prime Minister Milorad Dodik congratulated Tadić by saying that "The victory of Boris Tadić is of great importance for the RS and Serbia. This victory means continuation of cooperation between the two". Nebojša Radmanović, Serb member of the tripartite presidency of Bosnia and Herzegovina, and Rajko Kuzmanović, President of Republika Srpska, have congratulated Boris Tadić and stated that he will enjoy the full support of Republika Srpska in his activity. Igor Radojičić, Chairman of the National Assembly of Republika Srpska, stated that "people of Serbia have chosen a European course by their determination for future where Serbia will be a country of developed democratic ideas and a key factor of the regional stability". Željko Komšić, President of Bosnia and Herzegovina, expressed his wish that "the victory of Boris Tadić will lead to better relations between Serbia and Bosnia and Herzegovina".
- Bulgaria - Sergey Stanishev, Prime Minister of Bulgaria, said that "the victory of Boris Tadić over ultra-nationalist opponent is an important signal of the continued, predictable path of Serbia toward its European future."
- Croatia - President Stjepan Mesić congratulated Tadić and stated that "he hopes that two Presidents will work together in bridging problems from the past and will work towards deeper cooperation between two countries in the future".
- Czech Republic - Mirek Topolánek, Prime Minister of Czech Republic, said that "reelection of President Tadić will directly bring to the stability of the south European region". Karel Schwarzenberg, Minister of Foreign Affairs of the Czech Republic, said "President Tadić guarantees further democratic direction of the Serbian nation, which demonstrated its intention to set out on a European course" which makes him glad as "Serbian people have always supported Czech people in tough times".
- Denmark - Per Stig Møller, Foreign Minister of Denmark, stated that "the Serb voters are to be congratulated for this election result, which is good news for Serbia's European prospects, but also likely good news for the EU and all of Europe".
- European Union - Presidency of the Council of the European Union issued a statement saying that "the EU wishes to deepen its relationship with Serbia and to accelerate its progress towards the EU, including candidate status". Javier Solana, Secretary-General of the EU, said that "Europe is very satisfied with results which show that Serbia has chosen the path of European integration". José Manuel Barroso, President of the European Commission, congratulated Tadić on victory and stated that "it is a victory for democracy in Serbia and for the European Values we share. Serbia has shown capability to take the responsibility of modern and democratic society. European Union wishes to speed up the process of Serbian EU integration together with President Tadić". Hans-Gert Pöttering, President of the European Parliament, stated that "Serbian voters have shown they consider themselves a part of the European family.
- Finland - Ilkka Kanerva, Minister for Foreign Affairs of Finland, congratulated citizens of Serbia on election results and expressed his wish for Serbia to stay strongly on the same direction.
- France - Bernard Kouchner, Minister of Foreign Affairs of France, sent the "warmest congratulations" to Boris Tadić and hailed the "will of Serbia to progress on a European course".
- Germany - Horst Köhler, President of Germany, wrote a letter to Tadić stating "Your election success is an important signal for reform orientation of Serbia's development. I am glad that the majority of Serbian people share the European vision of Boris Tadić". Thomas Steg, Spokesman of the Cabinet of Germany, welcomed reelection of Tadić as good news for the whole Europe. He stated that election results were received with joy and that "Serbian people have underlined that they see Serbian future in Europe". Frank-Walter Steinmeier, Foreign Minister, said he was "extraordinarily pleased" with Tadić's win.
- Greece - Karolos Papoulias, President of Greece, congratulated Boris Tadić on reelection and said that "traditional and honest friendship between Serbia and Greece are the base for future strong cooperation". Kostas Karamanlis, Prime Minister of Greece, congratulated Tadić and stated that "the future of Serbia and all countries in the region is in the EU".
- Hungary - Kinga Göncz, Hungarian Minister of Foreign Affairs, said that "Hungary welcomes reelection of the moderate candidate Boris Tadić" and "Hungarian national minority in Serbia will benefit from his presidency"
- Italy - Massimo D'Alema, Italian Minister of Foreign Affairs and Deputy Prime Minister of Italy, said that "Boris Tadić will continue to successfully lead Serbia on the path of development and he will give inducement to internal reforms while leading Serbia into the European Union". Giorgio Napolitano, President of Italy and Romano Prodi, Prime Minister of Italy have also congratulated Boris Tadić on reelection.
- Macedonia - President Branko Crvenkovski stated in his congratulations that "the victory of Boris Tadić is the victory of European ideas and the choice that will lead to prosperity and the stability of the whole region". Antonio Milošoski, Minister of Foreign Affairs, said that victory of Tadić will strengthen cooperation between Serbia and Macedonia and speed up the process of Euroatlantic integration.
- Montenegro - Filip Vujanović, President of Montenegro, stated in his letter that "guarantee of Serbia's European path and friendship with neighboring and regional states. A continuation of such state policy, that you promoted in the previous mandate, provides you with a reliable partner and friend in Montenegro, for the good of the citizens and our states, which cherish close ties". Željko Šturanović, Prime Minister of Montenegro, and Milo Đukanović have stated that "the victory of Tadić is a victory of democratic values".
- Netherlands - Maxime Verhagen, Minister of Foreign Affairs, congratulated Boris Tadić and reminded that "it is up to Serbia to take necessary steps on path of EU accession".
- Norway - Jens Stoltenberg, Norwegian Prime Minister, said the result "demonstrates that Serbs have chosen cooperation rather than isolation, which bodes well for Serbia's further development".
- Romania - Traian Băsescu, President of Romania, said that "Serbian voters have shown strong determination for Europe by reelecting Tadić and that Romania will give all support to Serbia". Romanian Ministry of Foreign Affairs has welcomed the election results stating that they reflect the wish of Serbian voters for the continuation of EU integrations.
- Russia - Vladimir Putin, President of Russia, congratulated Tadić in a letter stating "Dear President, I wish you future success in your activity and peace and prosperity to the Serbian people". Konstantin Kosachyov, head of Russia's Foreign Affairs Committee, "Tadić is an absolutely predictable, promising and constructive partner". Sergey Mironov, Speaker of the Federation Council, said he was sorry that Tomislav Nikolić lost.
- Slovakia - Ivan Gašparovič, President of Slovakia, sent a telegram of congratulations "Your victory in the presidential elections is confirmation of the will and desire of the people in your country to continue the process of far-reaching democratic changes". Ján Kubiš, Minister of Foreign Affairs of Slovakia, stated that "the reelection of Boris Tadić verifies the high level of responsibility of the Serbian people for the European future of the whole country". Robert Fico, Prime Minister of Slovakia, expressed "support for the European future of Serbia".
- Slovenia - "Serbia has an open road to a European future", said Dimitrij Rupel. Slovenian Prime Minister and President-in-Office of the European Council Janez Janša also congratulated Tadić stating that "the result could be interpreted as a reflection of the desire and determination of Serbia’s democratic forces to accelerate towards their aim of EU membership". Danilo Türk, President of Slovenia, congratulated Tadić and expressed his wish that "the friendly relations between the two countries will continue to strengthen, and that cooperation between Ljubljana and Belgrade, based on mutual respect, will benefit both."
- Sweden - Carl Bildt, Swedish Minister for Foreign Affairs, said that "the result of the election is good for Serbia and the whole region. Efforts to bring Serbia into a deadlock have failed".
- United Kingdom - Prime Minister Gordon Brown stated that "the British Government shares political devotion of President Tadić for the common cause of the European Serbia". David Miliband, Secretary of State for Foreign and Commonwealth Affairs, welcomed election results and said that "President Boris Tadić is committed to European future of Serbia"
- United States - Sean McCormack, State Department Spokesman, congratulated Tadić and his Serbian Democratic Party on the victory and called the nearly 70 percent turnout for Sunday's voting remarkable. "We look forward to continuing our efforts to build a productive relationship with Serbia on matters of common interest. President Tadić promised voters a European future for Serbia," he said. "We will work with President Tadic and Serbia to see that promise fulfilled and Serbia firmly on a path toward European integration."
