= Bosniak People's Party =

Bosniak People's Party Bošnjačka Narodna Stranka Бошњачка Народна Странка
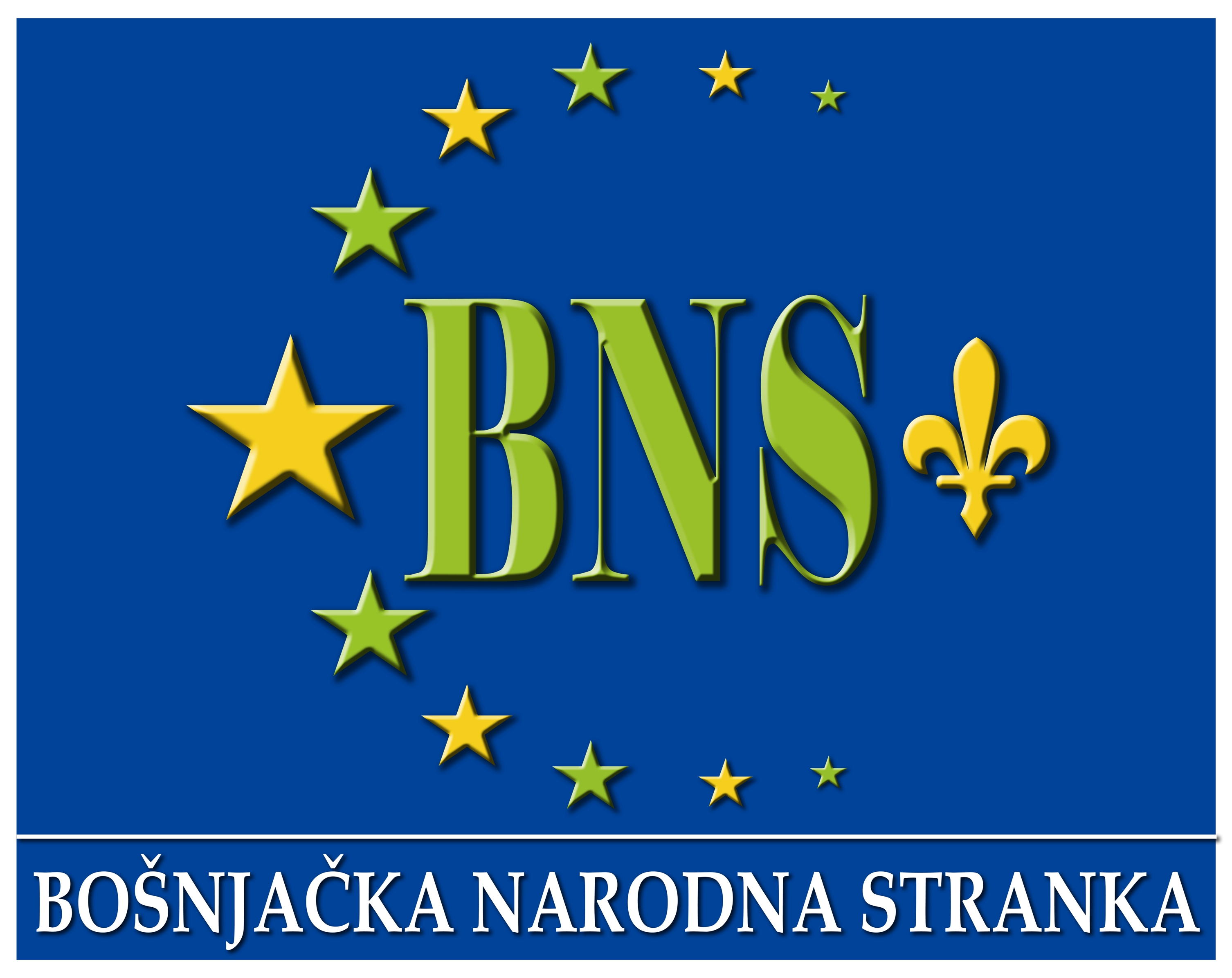
- Abbreviation: BNS
- Leader: Mujo Muković
- Founder: Mujo Muković
- Founded: 15 January 2012
- Headquarters: Novi Pazar
- Ideology: Bosniak minority interests
- Colours: Blue

Website
- www.bns.org.rs/test/index.php/predsednik

Bosniak People's Party (Serbian: Бошњачка Народна Странка, romanized: Bošnjačka Narodna Stranka, BNS) is an ethnic minority party in Serbia created on the 15 of January 2012 by Mujo Muković
