= 1998 Serbian foreign mediation in Kosovo referendum =

23 April 1998
- Do you accept the participation of foreign representatives in solving the problems in Kosovo and Metohija?

Results
Choice	Votes	%
Yes	180,692	3.48%
No	5,017,383	96.52%
Valid votes	5,198,075	98.12%
Invalid or blank votes	99,701	1.88%
Total votes	5,297,776	100.00%
Registered voters/turnout	7,243,750	73.14%

A referendum on foreign mediation in Kosovo was held in the Republic of Serbia on 23 April 1998. Voters were asked "Do you approve the participation of foreign representatives in solving the problems in Kosovo and Metohija?" The proposal was rejected by 96.53% of voters. The referendum was boycotted by Kosovan Albanians.

== Background ==
Yugoslav President Slobodan Milošević proposed the referendum on 2 April, but required a change to the law mandating that referendums can only be held 30 days after their announcement in order to have it held before the ultimatum of the Great Powers to make a decision by 25 April. On 6 April the National Assembly passed a law reducing the time limit to 15 days, with the vote of 205 in favour and nine against. The referendum was then approved the following day by a vote of 193 to four.

== Results ==
Choice	Votes	%
For	180,692	3.48
Against	5,017,383	96.52
Total	5,198,075	100.00
Valid votes	5,198,075	98.12
Invalid/blank votes	99,701	1.88
Total votes	5,297,776	100.00
Registered voters/turnout	7,243,750	73.14
Source: Direct Democracy
