= Milovan Drecun =

Serbian journalist and politician

Milovan Drecun MP
- Милован Дрецун
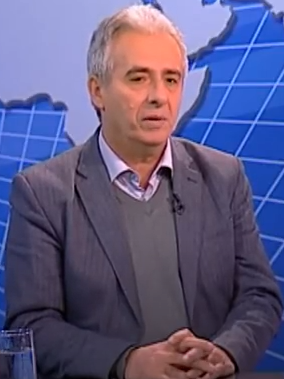
- Drecun in 2018

Member of the National Assembly of Serbia

Personal details
- Born: 10 April 1957 (age 68) Vranje, PR Serbia, FPR Yugoslavia
- Party: Serbian Progressive Party (2011–present)
- Spouse: Danijela
- Occupation: politician, journalist

Milovan Drecun (Serbian Cyrillic: Милован Дрецун born 4 October 1957) is a Serbian journalist and politician. A member of the Serbian Progressive Party (SNS), he has been an MP in the Serbian parliament since 2012.

During the 1990s Drecun worked as correspondent at the state-owned broadcaster RTS. In parallel, he maintained a career in politics. As member of the Serbian Revival, he was a candidate at the 2004 Serbian presidential elections receiving 0.54% of the popular vote.

== Early life ==
Drecun was born in Vranje, PR Serbia, FPR Yugoslavia. He is of Montenegrin descent. Drecun completed primary school in Surdulica before moving to Vladičin Han for high school studies. He then enrolled at the University of Belgrade's Faculty of Political Sciences, graduating in 1981.

== Journalism career ==
Drecun's first journalistic experience was with Narodna armija (People's Army), a magazine published by the Yugoslav People's Army (JNA). In 1992, following the breakup of SFR Yugoslavia, the magazine was renamed Vojska.

In 1993 he started working for the state-owned public broadcaster RTS where he remained until the end of Kosovo War in June 1999. During those six years Drecun was a war correspondent for the state television's main channel RTS 1, getting dispatched to Bosnia and Croatia during the Yugoslav Wars.

He was banned from national TV after the Kosovo War. He occasionally works for foreign corporations. He has written two books about the conflict in the Kosovo War - The Second Battle of Kosovo (Други Косовски Бој) and Kosmet Legend (Косметска легенда), he also wrote "Brate gde je nasa Srbija" (Brother where is our Serbia), "Rat za Kosovo" (War for Kosovo), and his latest work "Alahovi ratnici" (Allah's warriors), is about global terrorism.

== Political career ==
In 1996, Drecun joined the Socialist Party of Serbia (SPS), a ruling party in Serbia headed at the time by Slobodan Milošević.

In early 2000 Drecun formed his own political party called Serbian Revival.

In June 2011, Drecun joined the Serbian Progressive Party (SNS) led at the time by Tomislav Nikolić, which was in opposition. Drecun was on the SNS-led coalition electoral list for the 2012 parliamentary election where the list won slightly over 24% of the popular vote, which was good for 57 parliamentary seats. Drecun thus became an MP in the National Assembly.

== Personal ==
Drecun is married to Danijela and has two children by her, Dejan and Milica.

== See also ==
- Role of the media in the Yugoslav wars
