= Ljiljana Aranđelović =

Serbian politician

Ljiljana Aranđelović (Serbian Cyrillic: Љиљана Аранђеловић) (born 16 February 1963) is a Serbian politician and former presidential candidate in the 2004 Serbian presidential election.

She is a journalist and she has been an editor of many newspapers and RTV Ćuprija.

Her party, United Serbia, was created from the Party of Serbian Unity. She is its deputy president.
