= Zoran Milinković (politician) =

Serbian politician

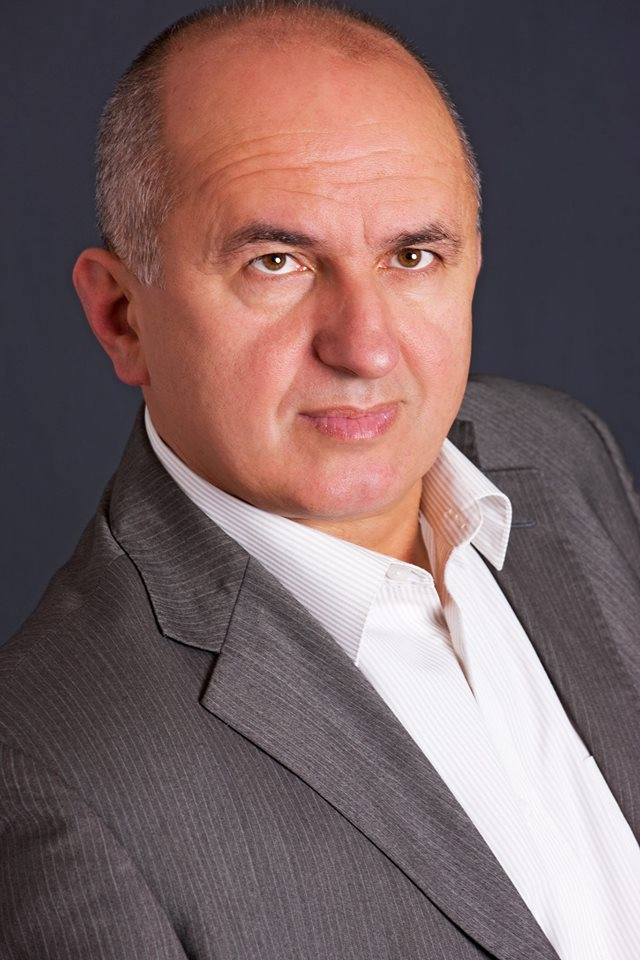
Portrait of Zoran Milinković

Zoran Milinković (Зоран Милинковић; born 26 September 1956) was the presidential candidate of the Patriots of the Serbian Diaspora in the 2004 Serbian presidential election.

He was born in Kraljevo, but from 1980th lives in Paris and he led anti-NATO demonstrations in France.
