= Dragomir Karić =

Serbian entrepreneur and politician

- Драгомир Карић
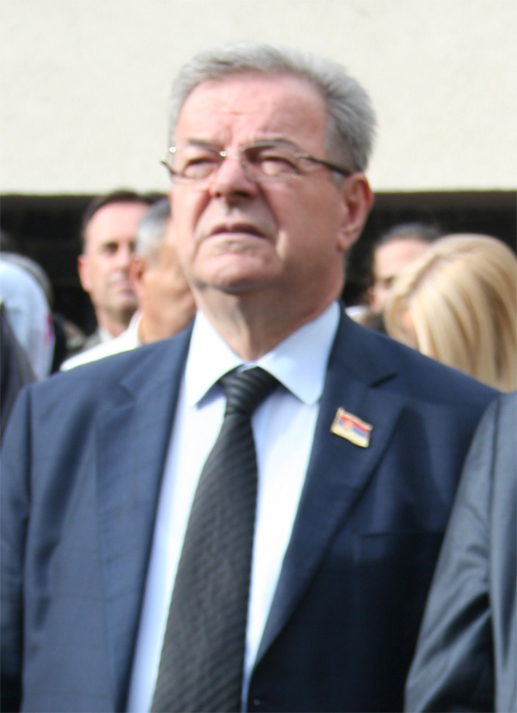
- Karić in 2017

Member of the National Assembly of Serbia

Personal details
- Born: 21 October 1949 (age 76) Peć, FPR Yugoslavia
- Party: Strength of Serbia Movement (2004–present)
- Education: University of Belgrade; Ukrainian Academy of Agronomy Sciences
- Occupation: Businessman; Politician

Dragomir "Dragan" Karić (Serbian Cyrillic: Драгомир Драган Карић; born 21 October 1949) is an entrepreneur and politician in Serbia. A close ally of his younger brother Bogoljub Karić, he has been a prominent figure in Serbia's business community since the 1980s. He has served in the National Assembly of Serbia since 2012 as a member of the Strength of Serbia Movement (Pokret snaga Srbije, PSS).

== Early life and career ==
Karić was born in Peć, Kosovo, in what was then the People's Republic of Serbia in the Federal People's Republic of Yugoslavia. He graduated from the University of Belgrade Faculty of Organizational Sciences in 1972. Karić later received a Ph.D. from the Institute of Agrarian Economics at the Ukrainian Academy of Agronomy Sciences in 1994, was a founder of the International University of Business and Management in Moscow, and holds a number of academic positions.

== Entrepreneur ==
The Karić family was one of the richest in Serbia during the 1990s. More recent reports suggest that their wealth and influence, though reduced, remain significant. A prominent member of the Braća Karić (Brothers Karić) group and its affiliated companies, Karić has overseen several business initiatives in Russia, Eastern Europe, the Commonwealth of Independent States, and other countries. Since 2014, he has played a leading role in the Minsk-Mir project in Belarus.

== International diplomacy ==
=== NATO bombing of Yugoslavia ===
During the North Atlantic Treaty Organization (NATO)'s 1999 bombing of Yugoslavia, Karić attended meetings of Russian and American legislators in Vienna in an effort to bring about a peace deal. American representatives Curt Weldon and Bernie Sanders both described Karić as having played an important role in the discussions, with Sanders noting that he "spoke with [Yugoslav president] Milošević repeatedly during the discussions, urging him to take the first step by releasing [three American] POWs." Members of the American team have credited Karić with bringing about the soldiers' release. The negotiating teams reached an arrangement that would have seen a stop to NATO's bombing campaign, the withdrawal of Yugoslav troops from Kosovo, and the introduction of a United Nations peacekeeping force in the province. Ultimately, the initiative was vetoed by the United States Department of State. During this time, Karić also took part in confidential peace talks with German foreign affairs minister Joschka Fischer.

At the conclusion of the conflict, Karić negotiated with various authorities in Russia for the reconstruction of Serbian infrastructure that had been destroyed by NATO bombing.

Curt Weldon later sought to bring Karić to the 2003 National Prayer Breakfast in Washington, D.C. The State Department and Immigration and Naturalization Service officials refused Karić entry on the grounds that he was prohibited from travelling to European countries. Weldon acknowledged having received unflattering information about the Karić family from American intelligence sources, though he offered the view that the brothers provided support for the Milošević regime under duress and were unfairly maligned for their actions.

=== Representative of Belarus ===
Karić was appointed as an envoy of the Belarusian Chamber of Commerce and Industry in Serbia in 2009. In 2012, Belarusian president Alexander Lukashenko credited him for "significant personal contribution to the development of trade and economic ties and the strengthening of friendly relations between Belarus and Serbia."

Dragomir Karić is an honorary consul of Belarus in Belgrade.

=== Jovan Vraniškovski ===
In August 2005, Karić met with Patriarch Alexy II of Moscow in a bid to secure the release of Archbishop of Ohrid Jovan Vraniškovski from a prison in Macedonia. Patriarch Alexy gave his support to Karić's efforts.

== Politician ==
Karić joined his brother Bogoljub's Strength of Serbia Movement on its formation in 2004 and led the party's electoral list for the City Assembly of Belgrade in the 2004 Serbian local elections. The list won five mandates, and he subsequently served as part of its city assembly delegation. He appeared in the third position on the party's list in the 2008 local elections, in which the party did not cross the threshold to win any mandates.

The SSP fielded its own electoral list for the national assembly in the 2007 and 2008 parliamentary elections, and Karić appeared on the party's list both times. In each instance, the list failed to cross the threshold to win representation in the assembly.

=== Parliamentarian ===
The Strength of Serbia Movement contested the 2012 parliamentary election as part of the Serbian Progressive Party's Let's Get Serbia Moving list. Karić received the thirty-seventh position and was elected when the alliance won seventy-three mandates. The Progressive Party emerged as the head of a coalition government after this election, and Karić served as part of its parliamentary majority. The Strength of Serbia Movement's alliance with the Progressive Party continued into the 2014 and 2016 elections; Karić was included on its list both times and was re-elected when the Progressive-led alliance won majority victories.

Karić was an observer for the 2015 Kazakhstani presidential election, which he described as having "high democratic standards." He also observed the 2015 Belarusian presidential election and the 2016 Belarusian parliamentary election and reached the same conclusion; on the former occasion, he was quoted as saying that in Belarus, "there is freedom, there is democracy and there is no disorder, which is the most important thing."

During the 2016–20 sitting of the assembly, Karić was a member of the parliamentary committee on the economy, regional development, trade, tourism, and energy, as well as serving as a deputy member of the committee on Kosovo-Metohija. He chaired several of Serbia's parliamentary friendship groups, including those with Angola, Bahrain, Belarus, Bhutan, Burundi, Chile, the Democratic Republic of the Congo, Djibouti, El Salvador, Ethiopia, Fiji, The Gambia, Guyana, Kuwait, Latvia, Malawi, Micronesia, Namibia, Nepal, Oman, the Philippines, Rwanda, Sierra Leone, Tajikistan, Tunisia, Uganda, Vietnam, Zambia, and Zimbabwe. In addition to this, he was a member of Serbia's parliamentary friendship groups with Albania, Algeria, Argentina, Armenia, Austria, Azerbaijan, Belgium, Bosnia and Herzegovina, Brazil, Bulgaria, Cape Verde, China, Croatia, Cuba, Cyprus, the Czech Republic, Denmark, Egypt, Finland, France, Georgia, Germany, Ghana, Greece, Hungary, India, Indonesia, Iran, Iraq, Israel, Italy, Japan, Kazakhstan, Lesotho, Lithuania, Luxembourg, Mexico, Moldova, Montenegro, Morocco, the Netherlands, North Macedonia, Norway, Palestine, Poland, Qatar, Romania, Russia, Saudi Arabia, Slovakia, Slovenia, South Korea, the Sovereign Military Order of Malta, Spain, the countries of Sub-Saharan Africa, Sweden, Switzerland, Syria, Turkey, Turkmenistan, Ukraine, the United Arab Emirates, and Venezuela. He served in the Progressive Party's parliamentary group.

In 2019, it was reported that Karić was writing a book on Aleksandar Čepurin, Russia's outgoing ambassador to Serbia.

Karić received the twenty-sixth position on the Progressive Party's Aleksandar Vučić — For Our Children electoral list for the 2020 Serbian parliamentary election and was returned for a fourth term when the list won a landslide victory with 188 mandates. He continues to serve on the committee for the economy, regional development, trade, tourism and energy, lead the parliamentary friendship group with Belarus, and serve on almost all of the other friendship groups that he either led or belonged to in the previous parliament.
