= Milanka Karić =

Serbian politician

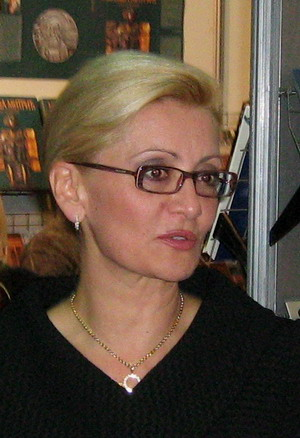

Personal details
- Born: 15 September 1957 (age 69) Peć, Yugoslavia
- Spouse: Bogoljub Karić

Milanka Karić (Serbian Cyrillic: Миланка Карић; born September 15, 1957) is a Serbian politician. She served in the National Assembly of Serbia from 2012 to 2020 as a member of the Strength of Serbia Movement, a political party led by her husband Bogoljub Karić.

== Early life and education ==
Karić was born in Peja, Kosovo and Mehotija, in what was then the People's Republic of Serbia in the Federal People's Republic of Yugoslavia. She holds a Bachelor of Laws degree from the University of Niš.

== Business career and philanthropy ==
The Karić family was one of the richest in Serbia during the 1990s. More recent reports suggest that their wealth and influence, though reduced, remain significant. Milanka Karić has been active in several of the family's business and philanthropic concerns, including serving as president of the Karić Foundation.

== Political career ==
=== 2008 presidential campaign ===
Karić ran as the Strength of Serbia Movement's candidate for president of Serbia in the 2008 election, when her husband was outside the country to avoid criminal prosecution. Her campaign slogan was, "Family Is the Strength of Serbia." She received 40,332 votes (0.98%), placing seventh in a field of nine candidates.

=== Parliamentarian ===
Strength of Serbia fielded its own electoral list for the National Assembly of Serbia in the 2007 and 2008 parliamentary elections; Karić led the list in 2007 and was given the second position in 2008. In each instance, the list failed to cross the electoral threshold to win representation in the assembly.

Karić attended a major opposition rally in 2011, conveying greetings from her husband and announcing Strength of Serbia's alliance with the leadership of the Serbian Progressive Party.

Strength of Serbia contested the 2012 parliamentary election as part of the Progressive Party's Let's Get Serbia Moving coalition. Karić was awarded the ninth position on the coalition's electoral list and was elected when the list won seventy-three mandates. The Progressive Party emerged as the head of a coalition government after this election, and Karić served as part of its parliamentary majority. The Strength of Serbia Movement's alliance with the Progressive Party continued into the 2014 and 2016 elections; Karić was included on its list both times and was re-elected when the Progressive-led alliance won landslide victories.

Karić is a member of the parliamentary foreign affairs committee; a deputy member of the committee on the judiciary, public administration, and local self-government; the head of Serbia's parliamentary friendship group with Kazakhstan; and a member of the parliamentary friendship groups with Austria, Azerbaijan, Belarus, Bosnia and Herzegovina, Canada, China, Croatia, Cuba, Cyprus, France, Germany, Greece, India, Indonesia, Iran, Iraq, Israel, Italy, Japan, Mexico, Montenegro, North Macedonia, Russia, Slovenia, South Korea, Spain, Turkey, the United Kingdom, the United States of America, and the Sovereign Military Order of Malta. She serves in the Progressive Party's parliamentary group.

=== Diplomat ===
Karić was appointed as Kazakhstan's honorary council in Serbia in June 2015.
