= Jugoslav Dobričanin =

Serbian politician

Jugoslav Dobričanin, M.A. (Serbian Cyrillic: Југослав Добричанин, born March 9, 1956, near Kuršumlija) is a Serbian politician. He is the vice-president of the Reformist Party. Jugoslav Dobričanin ran for president in the 2008 Serbian presidential election. He won only 0.29% of votes. He is a military historian.
