= Bogoljub Karić =

Serbian businessman and politician (born 1954)

- Богољуб Карић
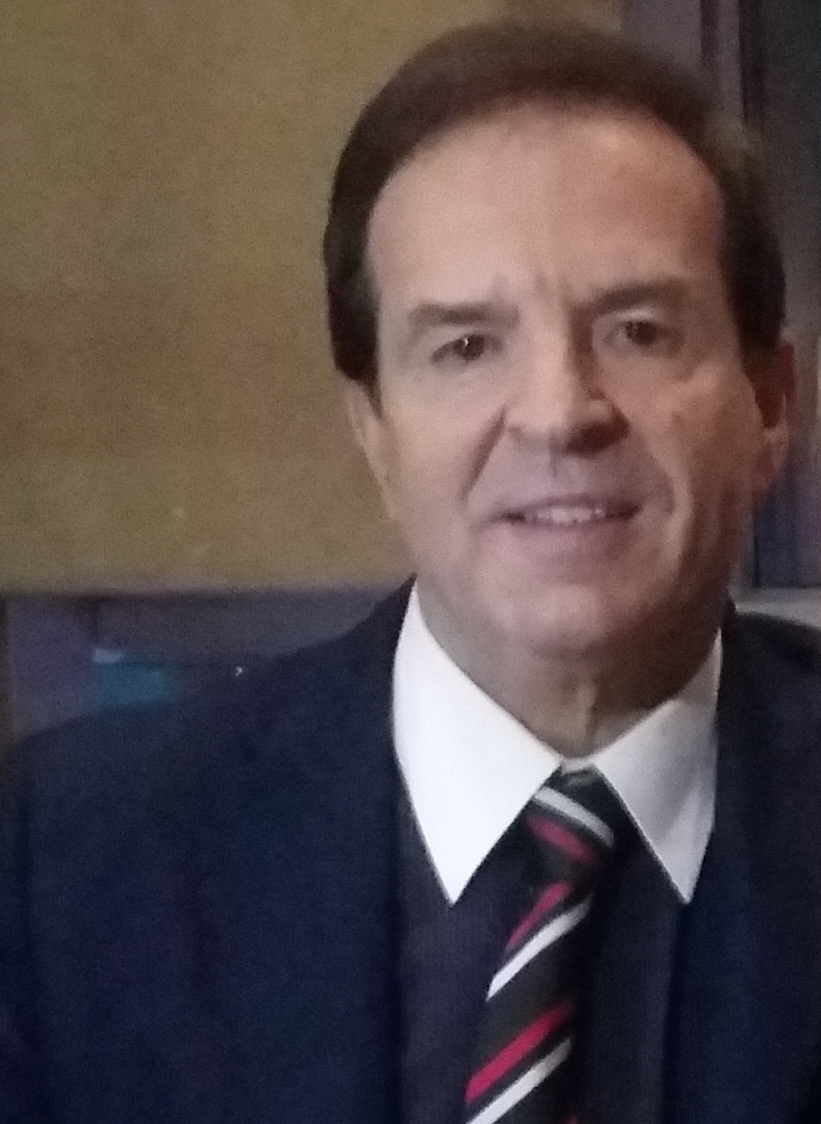

Minister without portfolio
- In office 24 March 1998 – 11 November 1999
- President: Milan Milutinović
- Prime Minister: Mirko Marjanović

Personal details
- Born: 17 January 1954 (age 72) Peć, PR Serbia, FPR Yugoslavia
- Party: Strength of Serbia Movement (2004–present)
- Spouse: Milanka Karić
- Children: 4
- Relatives: Dragomir Karić (brother)
- Education: University of Pristina; University of Niš
- Occupation: Businessman; politician

Bogoljub Karić (Serbian: Богољуб Карић, pronounced [boɡoʎub kaːritɕ]; born 17 January 1954) is a Serbian businessman and politician. With his family, he built the Astra (BK) Group, and he served as a minister without portfolio in the Government of Serbia from 1998 to 1999.

Karić finished third in the 2004 Serbian presidential election with 18.23% of the vote and founded the Strength of Serbia Movement (PSS) the same year. He left Serbia for Russia in 2006 during a criminal investigation and returned in 2016 after the proceedings were suspended. The PSS was allied with the Serbian Progressive Party (SNS) from 2012 to 2023. Since 2022, Karić has been under European Union sanctions over his business ties to the government of Alexander Lukashenko in Belarus. In 2026, he led the PSS list in the snap parliamentary election, which won 0.46% of the vote and no seats, and was nominated by the party for the presidential election.

== Early life and education ==
Karić was born in Peć to Janićije Karić and Danica Kuzmanović. He earned a degree in geography at the University of Pristina and a master's degree in economics at the University of Niš. His siblings include Dragomir Karić and Olivera Karić Nedeljković.

== Business career ==
In the 1970s, Karić founded the company Technicar, which made agricultural tools, and later Kosovo Univerzum, described as the first private factory in Eastern Europe. The Karić family expanded its businesses into the Astra (BK) Group, with interests in manufacturing, construction, trade, telecommunications and media, banking, education and charity. In 1987, he established the first private construction company in Moscow, then in the Soviet Union. In 2002, he founded the Association of Industrialists and Entrepreneurs of Yugoslavia.

In 2006, Karić left Serbia for Russia after the prosecutor's office opened an investigation against him over alleged fictitious investments through the mobile operator Mobtel. He returned to Serbia in December 2016 after the proceedings were suspended.

Karić and his family control Dana Holdings (Dana Astra), a real estate developer in Belarus whose projects include Minsk World.

== Political career ==
=== 2004–2023 ===
Karić ran in the 2004 Serbian presidential election and finished third with 568,691 votes (18.23%), behind Tomislav Nikolić and Boris Tadić. He then founded the Strength of Serbia Movement (PSS), which took part in the local elections of September 2004. In 2010, the party re-registered as the Strength of Serbia Movement – BK.

The PSS ran independently in the 2007 and 2008 parliamentary elections but did not pass the threshold. From 2012, it ran on the SNS-led lists, and in 2023 it did not run but supported the list of Aleksandar Vučić. In 2017, Karić endorsed Vučić in the presidential election.

=== 2026 elections ===
After consultations with Vučić in April 2026, Karić said that the PSS supported early parliamentary elections as a way to reduce tensions in society. In May, the party, now led by his brother Dragomir with Bogoljub as honorary president, decided to run independently for the first time in eighteen years. Karić said that its aim was to "reconcile" a divided nation. Analysts quoted by Danas doubted the party's independence from the SNS and suggested that its list would mainly serve to confuse anti-government voters.

When the list was submitted, the Republic Electoral Commission found 449 of its 11,052 supporting signatures to be invalid and gave the party 48 hours to correct the deficiency. The list "Bogoljub Karić – Strength of Serbia Movement" was proclaimed on 26 September, and Karić said that he expected to win 39% of the vote. During the campaign, he focused on demography and emigration, saying that Serbia was "exporting" its children rather than goods.

Several of Karić's campaign appearances drew media attention. Asked on the television channel KTV how much a litre of milk cost, he said that he could not say, guessed "maybe 30–40 dinars" and added "don't believe me", explaining that he did not pay for his own shopping because a person accompanying him did so. The news portal 021.rs listed among the "strange moments" of the campaign his remarks about importing sperm and making Serbia a large sperm bank, as well as videos of him eating ice cream with a woman and hugging a tree, which circulated on social media.

In the election on 25 October, the list won 20,045 votes (0.46%) and no seats. In November, the PSS executive board unanimously nominated Karić as its candidate for the presidential election.

== International sanctions ==
On 3 June 2022, the Council of the European Union imposed sanctions on Karić for "benefitting from or supporting" the government of Belarusian president Alexander Lukashenko. According to the Council, he and his family developed a network of real estate companies in Belarus and cultivated contacts with Lukashenko's family. Karić challenged the listing and its extensions, but the General Court dismissed his actions in November 2024 and September 2025, and in 2026 the Court of Justice rejected his appeal against the first ruling. He is also on Switzerland's sanctions list.

== Personal life ==
Karić is married to Milanka Karić (née Babić), and they have four children.
