= Strength of Serbia Movement =

Political party in Serbia

Strength of Serbia Movement – BK Покрет снага Србије – БК Pokret snaga Srbije – BK
- Abbreviation: PSS
- Leader: Bogoljub Karić
- Founded: 20 May 2004; 22 years ago
- Headquarters: Terazije 28, Belgrade
- Ideology: Conservatism; Populism; Russophilia
- Political position: Centre-right
- Colours: Blue
- National Assembly: 0 / 250
- Assembly of Vojvodina: 0 / 120
- City Assembly of Belgrade: 0 / 110

Website
- snagasrbije.com

The Strength of Serbia Movement – BK (Serbian: Покрет снага Србије – БК, Pokret snaga Srbije – BK, abbr. PSS) is a conservative political party in Serbia.

== History ==
The party was founded in 2004. Its founder and current leader of PSS-BK is Bogoljub Karić, Serbian businessman and tycoon under criminal charges in flight. From 2012 to 2026 it was a member of the big tent and populist Serbian Progressive Party-led (SNS) coalition.

In September 2026, PSS announced that it would participate independently in the upcoming parliamentary elections, submitting its own electoral list headed by Karić. Following the submission of their list, the Republic Electoral Commission (RIK) ordered an urgent verification of voter support signatures due to suspected irregularities in certain signatures, prompting checks by municipal administrations and public notaries.

== Political positions ==
PSS has been described as a conservative, liberal-conservative, populist, and pro-Russian party. It is positioned on the centre-right of the political spectrum.

== Electoral performance ==
=== Parliamentary elections ===
National Assembly of Serbia
Year	Leader	Popular vote	% of popular vote	#	# of seats	Seat change	Coalition	Status
2007	Bogoljub Karić	70,727	1.78%	▲9th	0 / 250	0	–	Extra-parliamentary
2008	Bogoljub Karić	22,250	0.55%	▲8th	0 / 250	0	–	Extra-parliamentary
2012	Bogoljub Karić	940,659	25.16%	▲1st	2 / 250	▲2	PS	Support
2014	Bogoljub Karić	1,736,920	49.96%	1st	2 / 250	0	BKV	Support
2016	Bogoljub Karić	1,823,147	49.71%	1st	2 / 250	0	SP	Support
2020	Bogoljub Karić	1,953,998	63.02%	1st	3 / 250	▲1	ZND	Support
2022	Bogoljub Karić	1,635,101	44.27%	1st	3 / 250	0	ZMS	Support
2023	Bogoljub Karić	1,783,701	48.07%	1st	0 / 250	▼3	SNSDS	Extra-parliamentary
2026	Bogoljub Karić	20,045	0.46%	▼8th	0 / 250	0	–	Extra-parliamentary

=== Presidential elections ===
President of Serbia
Year	Candidate	1st round popular vote		% of popular vote	2nd round popular vote		% of popular vote	Notes
2004	Bogoljub Karić	3rd	568,691	18.46%	—N/a	—	—	
2008	Milanka Karić	7th	40,332	1.0%	—N/a	—	—	
2012	Tomislav Nikolić	2nd	979,216	26.22%	1st	1,552,063	51.16%	Supported Nikolić
2017	Aleksandar Vučić	1st	2,012,788	56.01%	—N/a	—	—	Supported Vučić
2022	Aleksandar Vučić	1st	2,224,914	60.01%	—N/a	—	—	Supported Vučić

=== Provincial elections ===
The Movement received 42,813 votes (6.69%) and won 4 seats in the first round of the 2004 Vojvodina parliamentary elections and additional 3 seats in the second round, by the majority system.
