= Vojvodina Front (Serbia) =

Political coalition in Serbia

Vojvodina Front Војвођански фронт Vojvođanski front
- Abbreviation: VF
- Chairperson: Saša Šućurović
- Deputy Chairman: Aleksandar Odžić
- Founders: Aleksandar Odžić; Nenad Čanak; Tomislav Žigmanov
- Founded: 7 November 2019
- Dissolved: 9 February 2024
- Succeeded by: Vojvodinians
- Ideology: Vojvodina autonomism; Regionalism
- Political position: Centre-left
- Colours: Purple

Vojvodina Front (Serbian: Војвођански фронт, romanised: Vojvođanski front, abbr. VF) was a parliamentary group in the Assembly of Vojvodina. It was chaired by Saša Šućurović while Aleksandar Odžić served as deputy chairman.

Formed as a political coalition in 2019 between League of Social Democrats of Vojvodina, Vojvodina's Party, and Democratic Alliance of Croats in Vojvodina (DSHV), VF later became a member of the nationwide United Democratic Serbia coalition that also included parties like Serbia 21, Civic Democratic Forum, and Party of Modern Serbia. In the parliamentary election, VF failed to cross the 3 percent electoral threshold, losing all of its seats in the National Assembly of Serbia, however, it won 6 seats in the provincial election. VF did not take part in the 2022 parliamentary election and it instead stated its support to the DSHV–Together for Vojvodina coalition. VF lost its seats in the 2023 provincial election and ceased to exist in February 2024.

Although it served in opposition to the Serbian Progressive Party (SNS) on provincial level, VF was part of the local SNS-led government in Novi Sad until 2023. It unsuccessfully led a campaign on giving "Vojvodinian" the status of a nationality for the 2022 national census.

== History ==
=== Formation ===
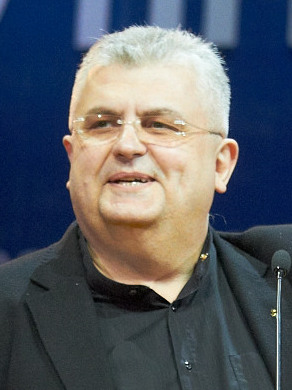
Nenad Čanak was one of the founders of the Vojvodina Front coalition

At a gathering in May 2019, Nenad Čanak, the president of the League of Social Democrats of Vojvodina (LSV), announced that the Vojvodina Front (VF) would be formed by October. Besides LSV, it was also announced that Aleksandar Odžić's Vojvodina's Party (VP) would take part in the coalition. Čanak described VF as the "last front of citizens who are not giving up on themselves and what is theirs". During this period, opposition parties, namely the Alliance for Serbia coalition, opted to boycott the 2020 parliamentary election and sessions of the National Assembly of Serbia. LSV did not take this path and it instead continued to attend sessions in the National Assembly. VF was officially formalised on 7 November 2019; Čanak, Odžić, and Tomislav Žigmanov, the president of the Democratic Alliance of Croats in Vojvodina (DSHV), were one of the signatories.

=== 2019–2020 ===
Shortly after its formation, members of VF adopted the "Memorandum on the Future of Vojvodina", in which the parties emphasised their support for democracy, commitment to the accession of Serbia to the European Union and NATO, and giving Vojvodina more autonomy. The document was also signed by the Alliance of Vojvodina Romanians, Montenegrin Party (CP), Alliance of Slovaks of Vojvodina, Together for Vojvodina (ZZV), Liberal Democratic Movement of Vojvodina, and Forum V–21. During the same period, Čanak announced that VF would take part in the 2020 elections. In March 2020, its electoral list for the local election in Novi Sad was accepted by Novi Sad's Electoral Commission. Alongside LSV and VP, ZZV was also featured on the list. In the same month, the United Democratic Serbia (UDS) coalition was formed for the 2020 parliamentary election; VF, Serbia 21 (S21), Civic Democratic Forum, and Party of Modern Serbia were its founding members. They later submitted their electoral list for the parliamentary election.

A month later, in April, VF formed a parliamentary group in the National Assembly with S21, named "Vojvodina Front–Serbia 21". Its members included Čanak, Nada Lazić, and Olena Papuga from LSV, (Note: Papuga is also the president of ZZV.) Žigmanov from DSHV, and Marko Đurišić and Nenad Konstantinović from S21. In the parliamentary election, UDS did not cross the 3 percent electoral threshold and lost all of its seats in the National Assembly. In the provincial election, however, VF, crossed the threshold and won 6 seats in total. In Novi Sad, VF also crossed the threshold, winning 3 seats in the City Assembly of Novi Sad. According to non-governmental organisation Transparency Serbia, VF spent around €24,000 in billboard and poster advertisements during the campaign period. After the elections in Novi Sad, LSV remained a member of the Serbian Progressive Party (SNS)-led local government in Novi Sad, however, VF declined to give its support for the provincial government led by SNS.

=== 2021–2024 ===
Beginning in 2021, VF has campaigned on introducing "Vojvodinian" as a nationality for the 2022 census. However, their campaign went unsuccessful, considering that "Vojvodinian" retained its status as a regional identity, and not a national one. Čanak was succeeded by Bojan Kostreš as president of LSV in November 2022. In February 2023, LSV left the local government in Novi Sad and joined the opposition. The parliamentary group ceased to exist on 9 February 2024, when the Assembly of Vojvodina was constituted in the aftermath of the 2023 Vojvodina provincial election.

== Ideology and platform ==
VF was initiated as a coalition of supporters of Vojvodina autonomism, which also included those who supported federalisation of Serbia. VF was in favour of returning Vojvodina's autonomous rights as written in the 1974 Yugoslav Constitution. Čanak also noted that VF would support the accession of Serbia to the European Union, decentralisation within Serbia, and anti-fascism. VF also advocated for further secularism.

While campaigning for the 2020 elections, VF has stated that the government should play a role in helping vegetable producers and has criticised government's actions towards farmers in Bačka Palanka. VF has also called for the government to help entrepreneurs, small business owners, and agricultural producers during the state of emergency that was proclaimed due to the COVID-19 pandemic.

== Members ==
At the time of its formation, VF had LSV, VP, and DSHV as its members. In late 2019, they were also joined by several minor parties and organisations. For the 2020 provincial election, LSV, VP, and DSHV were also joined by ZZV, CP, and the Democratic Bloc. After that, LSV and VP only remained its members.

In the Assembly of Vojvodina, VF had 6 members; 5 were affiliated with LSV while the sole VP member in the Assembly of Vojvodina was Odžić. Saša Šućurović was the chairperson of the VF parliamentary group while Odžić was the deputy chair.

Name	Leader	Main ideology	Political position	Assembly of Vojvodina	National Assembly
League of Social Democrats of Vojvodina (LSV)	Bojan Kostreš	Vojvodina autonomism	Centre-left	5 / 120	0 / 250
Vojvodina's Party (VP)	Aleksandar Odžić	Vojvodina autonomism	Left-wing	1 / 120	0 / 250
Democratic Alliance of Croats in Vojvodina (DSHV)	Tomislav Žigmanov	Croat minority interests	Centre-right	1 / 250	0 / 120
Together for Vojvodina (ZZV)	Olena Papuga	Rusyn minority interests	Centre-left	1 / 250	0 / 120
Montenegrin Party (CP)	Milo Milojko	Montenegrin minority interests	Centre-right	0 / 250	0 / 120
Democratic Bloc (DB)	Miljana Jovanović	Romani minority interests	Centre-left	0 / 250	0 / 120

== Electoral performance ==
=== Parliamentary elections ===
National Assembly
Year	Leader		Popular vote	% of popular vote	#	# of seats	Seat change	Coalition	Status	Ref.
Year	Name	Party	Popular vote	% of popular vote	#	# of seats	Seat change	Coalition	Status	Ref.
2020	Nenad Čanak	LSV	30,591	0.99%	▲13th	0 / 250	▼5	UDS	Extra-parliamentary	
2022	Nenad Čanak	LSV	Did not participate (Note: Both LSV and VP voiced support for the DSHV–ZZV coalition, which ended up winning two seats in the National Assembly.)			0 / 250	0	–	Extra-parliamentary	–

=== Provincial elections ===
Assembly of Vojvodina
Year	Leader		Popular vote	% of popular vote	#	# of seats	Seat change	Status	Ref.
Year	Name	Party	Popular vote	% of popular vote	#	# of seats	Seat change	Status	Ref.
2020	Nenad Čanak	LSV	41,455	5.12%	▲4th	6 / 120	▼3	Opposition	

=== Local elections ===
Municipality	Popular vote	% of popular vote	Seats	Status	Ref.
Alibunar	653	6.74%	1	Opposition	
Bač	758	10.98%	2	Opposition	
Bački Petrovac	293	4.78%	1	Opposition	
Bečej	616	3.67%	1	Opposition	
Bela Crkva	2,230	25.61%	9	Opposition	
Beočin	203	2.30%	0	Extra-parliamentary	
Irig	440	8.76%	1	Opposition	
Kanjiža	486	4.16%	1	Opposition	
Kikinda	1,114	4.19%	1	Opposition	
Kovačica	1,289	13.35%	4	Opposition	
Mali Iđoš	205	3.37%	0	Extra-parliamentary	
Nova Crnja	880	15.80%	4	Opposition	
Novi Bečej	1,245	12.12%	4	Opposition	
Novi Sad	6,311	4.65%	3	Government (until 2023)	
Novi Sad	6,311	4.65%	3	Opposition (since 2023)	
Sombor	1,104	3.30%	2	Opposition	
Sremska Mitrovica	1,187	3.04%	0	Extra-parliamentary	
Sremski Karlovci	262	6.61%	1	Opposition	
Subotica	3,000	5.36%	3	Opposition	
Šid	1,283	7.91%	3	Opposition	
Temerin	427	3.12%	1	Opposition	
Vršac	2,736	12.83%	6	Opposition	
Zrenjanin	2,545	6.23%	4	Opposition	
Žabalj	612	5.48%	1	Opposition	
Žitište	398	5.20%	1	Opposition	
