= Aleksandar Odžić =

Serbian politician (born 1968)

- Александар Оџић

Member of the Assembly of Vojvodina
- Incumbent
- Assumed office 31 July 2020
- In office 2000–2004

Personal details
- Born: 1968 (age 57–58) Novi Sad, SAP Vojvodina, SR Serbia, SFR Yugoslavia
- Party: LSV (before); VP

Aleksandar Odžić (Serbian Cyrillic: Александар Оџић; born 1968) is a Serbian politician who has been a member of the Assembly of Vojvodina since 31 July 2020. A Vojvodina autonomist, he has been the president of the Vojvodina's Party (VP) since 2009.

== Private career ==
Odžić was born in 1968 in Novi Sad, SAP Vojvodina, SR Serbia, SFR Yugoslavia. By profession, Odžić claims to be a graduate manager of security. He is employed at JVP Vode Vojvodine as an independent professional associate for safety, occupational health and fire protection. He also worked in SPC Vojvodina, Novi Sad City Administration for Inspection Affairs, VDP "Šajkaška" and Novi Sad company AMB "Grafika".

== Political career ==
Odžić started his political career as a member of the centre-left League of Social Democrats of Vojvodina (LSV). During his tenure in LSV he held several public and party positions. He was a member of the City Assembly of Novi Sad from 2000 to 2004 and from 2004 to 2008 and a member of the Assembly of Vojvodina from 2000 to 2004.

Odžić was the founder and president of the Novi Sad Party, which along with several Vojvodina parties and organizations, merged into Vojvodina's Party (VP). Odžić was elected president of VP in 2009.

In the 2020 provincial election, VP contested as part of the Vojvodina Front (VF) alliance and Odžić was elected member in the Assembly of Vojvodina once again. He was appointed deputy chairman of the VF parliamentary group.

== Political positions ==
Odžić is a Vojvodina autonomist, advocating for higher level of autonomy for Vojvodina. His views and statements are controversial in Serbia where he is often labeled a separatist.

Beginning in 2021, Odžić and the Vojvodina Front have campaigned on introducing "Vojvodinian" as a nationality for the 2022 census. However, their campaign went unsuccessful, considering that "Vojvodinian" retained its status as a regional identity, and not a national one.

== Personal life ==
He declares himself Vojvodinian by ethnicity. He has three daughters. Besides Serbo-Croatian, he also speaks English.
