= Nada Lazić =

Serbian politician (born 1950)

- Нада Лазић

Member of the National Assembly of the Republic of Serbia
- In office 16 April 2014 – 3 August 2020

Personal details
- Born: November 11, 1950 (age 75) Zrenjanin, PR Serbia, FPR Yugoslavia
- Party: LSV (1997–present)

Nada Lazić (Serbian Cyrillic: Нада Лазић; born 11 November 1950) is a Serbian politician. She served in the National Assembly of Serbia from 2014 to 2020 as a member of the League of Social Democrats of Vojvodina (LSV).

== Early life and career ==
Lazić was born in Zrenjanin, Autonomous Province of Vojvodina, in what was then the People's Republic of Serbia in the Federal People's Republic of Yugoslavia. She completed elementary school and high school in Novi Sad and graduated from the University of Novi Sad's Faculty of Chemistry in 1974. She later worked in water protection and related fields for the city of Novi Sad, and in 2002 she became an assistant to the secretary for environmental protection and sustainable development in the Vojvodina provincial government. Lazić retired in 2012.

== Politician ==
Lazić joined the LSV in 1997 and was president of its women's forum from 2000 to 2005. The party contested the 2003 Serbian parliamentary election as part of the Together for Tolerance (ZZT) coalition, and Lazić was included in the 107th position on its electoral list. The list narrowly missed crossing the electoral threshold for assembly representation.

She received the third position on the LSV-led Together for Vojvodina (ZZV) list for the Novi Sad city assembly in the 2004 Serbian local elections and was elected when the list won nine mandates. The Serbian Radical Party (SRS) won the election, and the LSV served in opposition in the city for the next four years. Lazić also appeared on the ZZV list for the Assembly of Vojvodina in the concurrent 2004 provincial election, although she did not receive a mandate afterward.

The LSV contested the 2007 parliamentary election on the electoral list of the Liberal Democratic Party (LDP), and Lazić appeared on the list in the 122nd position. The list won fifteen seats, and she was not chosen for a mandate. (From 2000 to 2011, Serbian parliamentary mandates were awarded to sponsoring parties or coalitions rather than to individual candidates, and it was common practice for the mandates to be assigned out of numerical order. Lazić could have been awarded a mandate despite her low position on the list, which was in any event mostly alphabetical, though ultimately this did not happen.) She later appeared on the LSV's lists for the 2008 provincial election and the 2008 local election in Novi Sad, though she was not afterward given a mandate at either level.

=== Parliamentarian ===
Serbia's electoral system was reformed in 2011, such that all parliamentary mandates were awarded to candidates on successful lists in numerical order. The LSV contested the 2014 parliamentary election as part of a coalition led by former Serbian president Boris Tadić. Lazić received the eighteenth position on the coalition's list and was elected when it won exactly eighteen mandates. The Serbian Progressive Party (SNS) and its allies won a majority victory in this election, and the LSV served in opposition. Lazić was deputy chair of the assembly committee on the rights of the child; a member of the committee for environmental protection; a deputy member of the economy committee, (Note: Formally known as the Committee on the Economy, Regional Development, Trade, Tourism, and Energy.) the education committee, (Note: Formally known as the Committee on Education, Science, Technological Development, and the Information Society.) and the committee for human and minority rights and gender equality; a deputy member of Serbia's delegation to the South-East European Cooperation Process parliamentary assembly; and a member of Serbia's parliamentary friendship groups with Austria, Azerbaijan, Japan, Portugal, and Slovenia.

For the 2016 parliamentary election, the LSV joined a coalition list with the LDP and Tadić's Social Democratic Party (SDS). Lazić received the third position on the list and was re-elected when it won thirteen mandates. The SNS and its allies won another majority victory, and the LSV continued in opposition. Lazić also appeared in the eighteenth position on the LSV's list in the concurrent 2016 Vojvodina provincial election and the fifteenth position on its list in the 2016 local election in Novi Sad; the lists respectively won nine and seven mandates, and she was not elected at either level.

In her second parliamentary term, Lazić again served as deputy chair of the committee on the rights of the child and was a member of the agriculture committee (Note: Formally known as the Committee on Agriculture, Forestry, and Water Management.) and the environmental protection committee, a deputy member of the education committee and the committee for European integration, a member of a subcommittee for monitoring the agricultural situation in Serbia's most underdeveloped areas, a member of Serbia's delegation to the parliamentary dimension of the Central European Initiative, and a member of the friendship groups with Austria, Germany, Slovenia, Sweden, and Turkey. She was also part of an informal parliamentary "Green Group."

The LSV contested the 2020 parliamentary election as part of the United Democratic Serbia alliance, and Lazić appeared in the thirty-fifth position on its list. The list did not cross the electoral threshold. She also received the twenty-fourth position on the LSV's list in the concurrent provincial election and was not elected when the list won seven mandates.

Lazić appeared in the forty-third position on the LSV-led Vojvodinians list in the 2023 Vojvodina provincial election. This was too low a position for election to be a realistic prospect, and the list did not cross the electoral threshold in any event.
