= Vojvodina Front =

Vojvodina Front (Serbian: Војвођански фронт, romanized: Vojvođanski front) may refer to:

- Vojvodina Front (Yugoslavia), a group of opposition parties that advocated for the creation of Vojvodina in the Kingdom of Yugoslavia
- Vojvodina Front (Serbia), a political coalition and a parliamentary group in the Assembly of Vojvodina
