= Saša Levnajić =

Serbian politician (born 1980)

Saša Levnajić (Serbian Cyrillic: Саша Левнајић; born 11 April 1980) is a politician in Serbia. He has served in the Assembly of Serbia since 2016 as a member of the Serbian Progressive Party.

== Private career ==
Levnajić graduated from the University of Belgrade Faculty of Law in 2003 and works as a lawyer. He lives in Pančevo, Vojvodina.

== Politician ==
=== Municipal politics ===
Levnajić first sought election to the Pančevo city assembly in the 2012 Serbian local elections, receiving the twentieth position on the Progressive Party's electoral list. The list won eighteen seats, and he was not immediately returned. He received a mandate on 9 May 2013 as the replacement for another party member. Levnajić was appointed as the city's deputy mayor on 19 June 2015 and held the position for the following year.

He was promoted to the eighth position on the Progressive list for the 2016 local elections and was elected when the list won a majority victory with thirty-nine of seventy seats. For the 2020 local elections, he was given the second position and was re-elected when the list won forty-seven seats. As of 2020, he is the Progressive Party's commissioner in Pančevo.

=== Provincial politics ===
Levnajić was given the sixteenth position on the Progressive Party's list in the 2016 Vojvodina provincial election and was elected to the provincial assembly when the list won a majority victory with sixty-three out of 120 seats. In the sitting of parliament that followed, he was the chair of the assembly committee on regulations.

He received the fourteenth position on the party's list in the 2020 provincial election and was re-elected when the list won seventy-six seats. He was selected for a second term as chair of the committee on regulations in October 2020. He is also the deputy president of the Progressive Party group in the assembly, a member of the committee on the constitutional and legal status of the province, and a member of the committee on establishing equal authenticity of provincial legislation in languages in official use.
