= Dejana Krsmanović =

Serbian politician (born 1989)

Dejana Krsmanović (Serbian Cyrillic: Дејана Крсмановић; born 1989) is a politician in Serbia. She has served in the Assembly of Vojvodina since 2016 as a member of the Serbian Progressive Party.

== Private career ==
Krsmanović has a bachelor's degree in management. She lives in Šid.

== Politician ==
=== Provincial assembly ===
Krsmanović received the fortieth position on the Progressive Party's electoral list in the 2016 Vojvodina provincial election and was elected when the list won a majority victory with sixty-three out of 120 mandates. She was promoted to the eleventh position in the 2020 provincial election and was re-elected when the list won seventy-six mandates. In October 2020, Krsmanović was selected as chair of the assembly committee for petitions and motions. She also serves on the committee for European integration and interregional cooperation.

=== Municipal politics ===
Krsmanović appeared in the lead position on the Progressive Party's list for the Šid municipal assembly in the 2020 Serbian local elections and was elected when the list won a majority victory with twenty-eight out of thirty-nine seats. She is a member of the municipal committee on budget and finance.
