= Suzana Pronić =

Serbian politician

Suzana Pronić (Serbian Cyrillic: Сузана Пронић) is a politician in Serbia. She has served in the Assembly of Vojvodina as a member of the Serbian Progressive Party.

== Private career ==
Pronić was born in Vršac, Vojvodina, Serbia, in what was then the Socialist Federal Republic of Yugoslavia. She holds a master's degree (2014) from the University of Novi Sad's Faculty of Natural Sciences and Mathematics, in the field of biochemistry. Pronić was appointed to the management board of Apoteke Vršac in 2016. Two years later, she began working at the Oenological Station in Vršac and started post-graduate studies at the University of Belgrade's Faculty of Biology.

== Politician ==
Pronić received the fiftieth position on the Progressive Party's Aleksandar Vučić — For Our Children electoral list in the 2020 provincial election and was elected when the list won a majority victory with seventy-six out of 120 mandates. She is a member of the committee on education and science and the committee on health, social policy, labour, demographic policy, and social child care.
