= Vesna Furundžić =

Serbian politician

Vesna Furundžić (Serbian Cyrillic: Весна Фурунџић; born 1981) is a politician in Serbia. She has served in the Assembly of Vojvodina since 2020 as a member of the Serbian Progressive Party.

== Private career ==
Furundžić holds a bachelor's degree in economics. She lives in Pančevo.

== Politician ==
Furundžić was elected to the Kotež local community council in Pančevo in 2017.

She received the fortieth position on the Progressive Party's Aleksandar Vučić — For Our Children electoral list in the 2020 Vojvodina provincial election and was elected when the list won a majority victory with seventy-six out of 120 mandates. She is now a member of the assembly committee on gender equality and the committee on urban and spatial planning and environmental protection.

She also received the twentieth position on the Progressive Party's list in Pančevo for the concurrent 2020 Serbian local elections and was elected when the list won a majority victory with forty-seven out of seventy mandates.
