= Radmila Mitrović =

Serbian politician

Radmila Mitrović (Serbian Cyrillic: Радмила Митровић; born 1972) is a Serbian politician. She has served in the Assembly of Vojvodina since 2020 as a member of the Serbian Progressive Party.

== Private career ==
Mitrović is a primary school teacher living in Inđija. She has been president of the local folk art association.

== Politician ==
=== Municipal politics ===
Mitrović received the third position on the Progressive Party's coalition electoral list for the Inđija municipal assembly in the 2012 Serbian local elections and was elected when the list when six mandates. The Democratic Party and its allies formed government after the election, and Mitrović served for the next four years in opposition.

She was given the ninth position on the Progressive list for Inđija in the 2016 local elections and was re-elected when the list won a majority victory with twenty-one of thirty-seven mandates. She led the Progressive caucus in the assembly for the next four years and did not seek re-election at the local level in 2020.

In September 2020, the Serbian media printed reports that Mitrović and another prominent member of the Progressive Party's local board in Inđija had led associations that received significant funding from the municipal administration, intended for the realization of projects of public importance.

=== Assembly of Vojvodina ===
Mitrović was given the sixtieth position on the Progressive-led Aleksandar Vučić — For Our Children electoral list in the 2020 Vojvodina provincial election and was elected when the list won a majority victory with seventy-six out of 120 seats. She is now a member of the committee on agriculture.
