= Igor Stojkov =

Serbian politician

Igor Stojkov (Serbian Cyrillic: Игор Стојков; born 18 January 1990) is a politician in Serbia. He has served in the Assembly of Vojvodina since 2020 as a member of Serbian Progressive Party.

== Early life and career ==
Stojkov was born in Senta, Vojvodina, in what was then the Socialist Republic of Serbia in the Socialist Federal Republic of Yugoslavia. He graduated from the University of Novi Sad's law faculty in 2012, subsequently received a master's degree, and passed the bar exam in 2015. He interned in Novi Sad and Subotica.

He was hired as secretary of the Senta municipal assembly on 25 September 2017 and received another appointment for a four-year term in the role on 21 August 2020 (after resigning the assembly seat that he had won in that year's local election).

== Politician ==
Stojkov joined the Progressive Party in 2015. He was given the seventh position on the party's list for the Senta municipal assembly in the 2020 Serbian local elections and was elected when the list won ten mandates. He resigned his mandate on 21 August.

He also received the fifty-sixth position on the Progressive-led Aleksandar Vučić — For Our Children list in the 2020 Vojvodina provincial election (which was held concurrently with the local elections) and was elected when the list won a majority victory with seventy-six out of 120 mandates. He is a member of the assembly committee on regulations and the committee on issues of the constitutional and legal status of the province.
