= Zoran Vuletić =

Zoran Vuletić may refer to:

- Zoran Vuletić (politician) (born 1970), Serbian politician
- Zoran Vuletić (musician) (born 1960), Croatian keyboardist, of the band Haustor
