= Aleksandar Stevanović =

Aleksandar Stevanović may refer to:

- Aleksandar Stevanović (footballer) (born 1992), German-Serbian footballer
- Aleksandar Stevanović (politician) (born 1976), Serbian economist and politician
