= Aleksandar Olenik =

Serbian politician and lawyer (1973)

- Александар Оленик
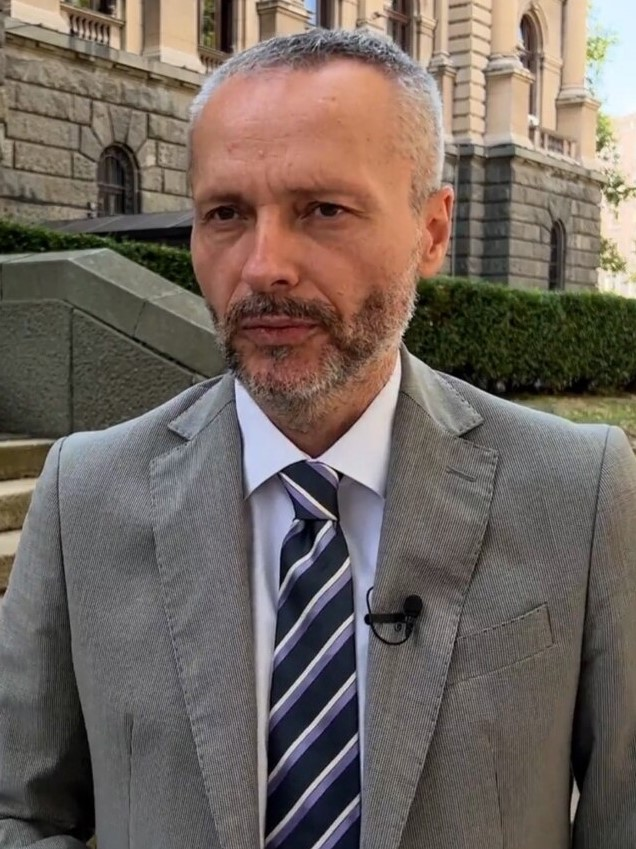
- Olenik in 2022

Member of the National Assembly
- Incumbent
- Assumed office 1 August 2022

President of the Civic Democratic Forum
- In office 2 March 2019 – 3 October 2020
- Preceded by: Office established
- Succeeded by: Zoran Vuletić

Personal details
- Born: 1973 (age 51–52); Kikinda, SAP Vojvodina, SR Serbia, SFR Yugoslavia
- Political party: PSG (2017–2019); GDF (2019–2020); ZZV (2022–2024); LSV (2024–present)
- Occupation: Politician, lawyer

Aleksandar Olenik (Serbian Cyrillic: Александар Оленик, born 1973) is a Serbian politician and lawyer. He has been a member of the National Assembly of Serbia since 2022. He is a former president of the Civic Democratic Forum. He also works in the legal team of the Gay Straight Alliance, an organization that fights for the LGBT rights in Serbia.

== Biography ==
He was born in 1973 in Kikinda.

He has worked as a lawyer in several domestic and international organizations, such as the Norwegian Refugee Council, the Danish Refugee Council, Mercy Corps and the Humanitarian Law Center, where he has represented national and religious minorities, Internally displaced persons, refugees and victims of war crimes. He is currently working on similar cases at the Belgrade Center for Minority Rights and the European Roma Rights Center in Budapest. During 2010, he worked at the United Nations Development Programme in Belgrade as a national consultant in charge of analyzing the application of the criminal code in the part that deals with discrimination.

He was a member of the Movement of Free Citizens, in which he had the function of a member of the executive board and the head of the legal team.

After the former president of the movement Saša Janković retired from politics, he ran for president. Soon after Sergej Trifunović was elected to that position.

Olenik and some other members left the Movement of Free Citizens in early 2019, and claimed that they did not leave the movement because of Trifunović, but because of the change in politics.

He was one of the initiators of the founding of the new political organization Civic Democratic Forum, whose president he became at the founding assembly in March 2019.

== Views ==
Olenik is a Vojvodina autonomist and is known for his anti-clerical views and his opposition to the Serbian Orthodox Church and advocates for the abolition of religious education in schools in Serbia, as well as for imposing a "luxury tax" for the Church.
