= Gizela Crkvenjakov =

Serbian politician

Gizela Crkvenjakov (Serbian Cyrillic: Гизела Црквењаков; born 1960) is a politician in Serbia from the country's Hungarian community. She has served in the Assembly of Vojvodina since 2016 as a member of the Serbian Progressive Party.

== Private career ==
Crkvenjakov holds a bachelor's degree in management. She lives in Kanjiža, a predominantly Hungarian municipality in the north of Vojvodina.

== Politician ==
=== Municipal politics ===
Crkvenjakov appeared in the lead position on the Progressive Party's electoral list for Kanjiža in the 2016 Serbian municipal elections and won election to the municipal assembly when the list won five mandates. The election was won by the Alliance of Vojvodina Hungarians. Crkvenjakov resigned her mandate on 9 June 2016.

=== Assembly of Vojvodina ===
Crkvenjakov received the twenty-fourth position on the Progressive Party's list in the 2012 Vojvodina provincial election and missed election when the list won fourteen mandates. Vojvodina subsequently switched from a mixed electoral system to full proportional representation; Crkvenjkaov was given the forty-sixth position on the Progressive list in the 2016 provincial election and was elected when the list won a majority victory with sixty-three out of 120 mandates. She was active with the Women's Parliamentary Network in the sitting of the assembly that followed. She also defended the assembly's adoption of symbols from 1848, which was controversial among some national minority communities.

She was promoted to the twenty-third position on the Progressive list for the 2020 provincial election and was re-elected when the list won seventy-six mandates. She is now a member of the assembly committee on national equality and the committee on gender equality.
