= Ivan Tešić =

Serbian politician

Ivan Tešić (Serbian Cyrillic: Иван Тешић; born 1986) is a politician in Serbia. He has served in the Assembly of Vojvodina since 2020 as a member of the Serbian Progressive Party.

== Private career ==
He lives in Pančevo. His academic career began in the 2018/2019 academic year and ended on September 12, 2019, when he graduated with a degree in Economics in less than a year.

== Politician ==
=== Municipal politics ===
Tešić received the twentieth position on the Progressive Party's electoral list for the 2016 Serbian local elections in Pančevo and was elected when the list won a majority victory with thirty-nine out of seventy seats. He was given the thirty-fifth position on the party's list for Pančevo in the 2020 local elections and was re-elected when the list won forty-seven mandates.

He was physically attacked in Pančevo in February 2020.

He was the coordinator for Vojvodina Šume during the 2026 forest fires in the national park Deliblatska peščara, during which massive fires have erupted, and the municipal organization was blamed for inadequate protection and incompetence.

=== Assembly of Vojvodina ===
Tešić was given the 118th position (out of 120) on the Progressive Party's list in the 2016 Vojvodina provincial election. This was too low a position for election to be a realistic prospect, and he was not elected even as the list won a majority victory with sixty-three mandates.

He was promoted to the thirty-sixth position on the party's Aleksandar Vučić — For Our Children list in the 2020 provincial election and was elected when the list won an increased majority with seventy-six mandates. He is now a member of the committee on agriculture and the committee on urban and spatial planning and environmental protection.
