= Marko Đurišić =

Marko Đurišić may refer to:

- Marko Đurišić (footballer)
- Marko Đurišić (politician)
