= Nenad Konstantinović =

Serbian politician

- Ненад Константиновић
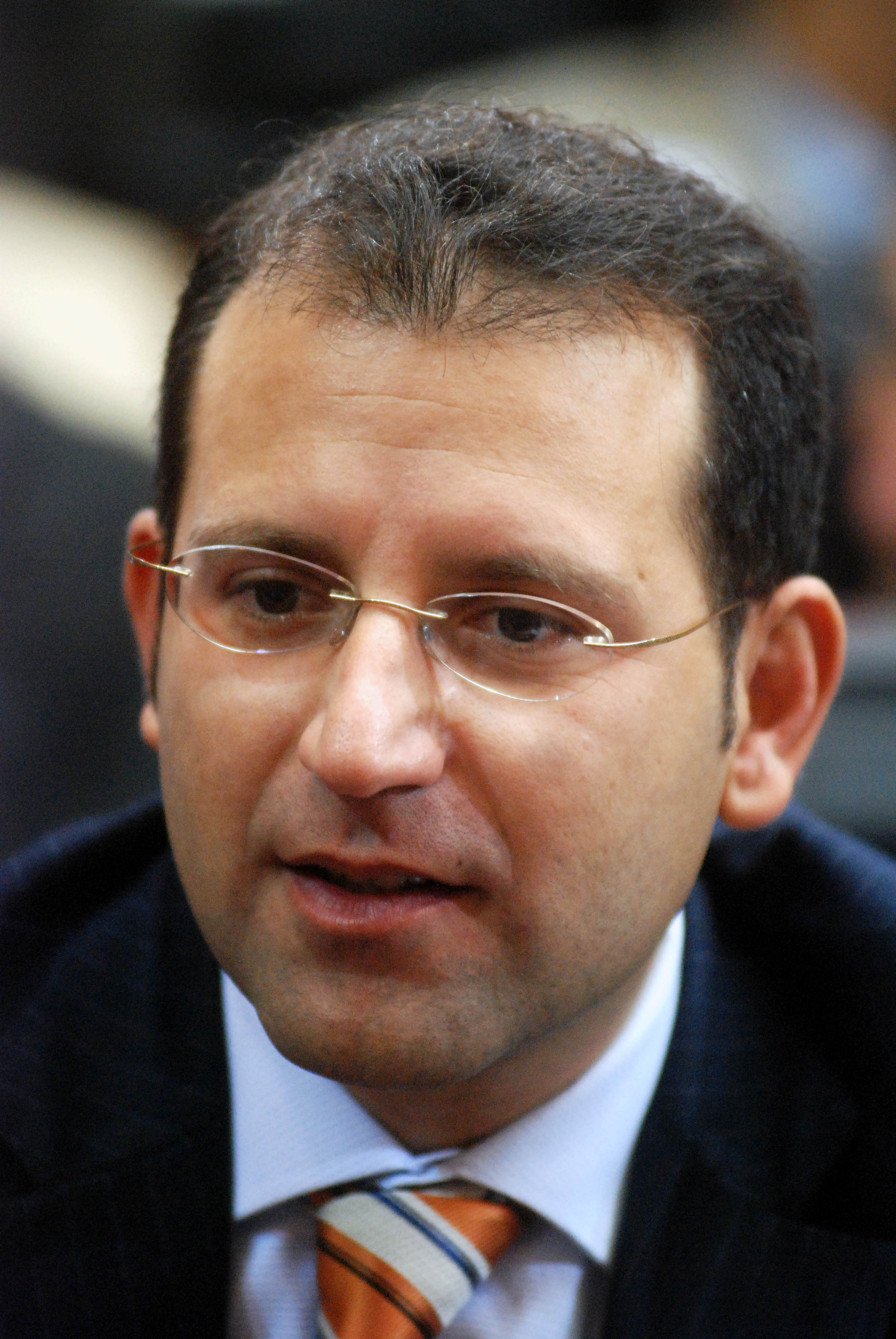

Member of the National Assembly of the Republic of Serbia
- In office 3 June 2016 – 3 August 2020
- In office 14 February 2007 – 16 April 2014

Member of the City Assembly of Belgrade
- In office 26 November 2004 – 14 July 2008

Personal details
- Born: July 9, 1973 (age 52) Belgrade, SR Serbia, SFR Yugoslavia
- Party: DS (1998–2003); Otpor! (2003–04); DS (2004–14); NDS/SDS (2014–20); Serbia 21 (2020)
- Occupation: Politician, lawyer

Nenad Konstantinović (Serbian Cyrillic: Ненад Константиновић; born 9 July 1973) is a Serbian politician. He was a prominent member of the student movement Otpor! and has served several terms in the National Assembly of Serbia.

== Early life and activism ==
Konstantinović was born in Belgrade, in what was then the Socialist Republic of Serbia in the Socialist Federal Republic of Yugoslavia. Trained as a lawyer, he emerged as a prominent opponent of Slobodan Milošević's authoritarian rule as a student in the 1990s. He was vice-president of the main board of the student protest during the 1996–97 street protests in Serbia and vice-president of Serbia's student parliament in 1997–98.

Konstantinović became a founding member of the opposition group Otpor! (Resistance!) in 1998. The following year, he issued the group's "Declaration for Serbia's future," which called for Milošević's resignation and for "free and democratic elections for a constitutive assembly, under the rules and complete control of the Organization for Security and Co-operation in Europe (OSCE)." He also called for an alliance of "all Serbian democratic forces" around the manifesto's goals. Konstantinović was later an organizer of Otpor!'s daily protests against Milošević in May 2000; during this time, he said that the Milošević regime would need to fall as a precondition for democratic change.

Milošević and his allies fell from power in October 2000, and an alliance of opposition parties formed new administrations in both Serbia and the Federal Republic of Yugoslavia. In the aftermath of these changes, Konstantinović helped organize a volunteer group called the Service for Enforcement of Truth, which documented abuses of power by Milošević-era officials with the aim of initiating criminal prosecutions in Serbia. He urged Serbia's leaders to arrest Milošević, although he acknowledged the difficulties prosecutors would face in achieving a conviction. "We don't have any documents with a signature," he said. "[Milošević] used to give orders by telephone to his cronies so you can only arrest people like Rade Marković and (former customs chief) Mihalj Kertes and press them to talk." After the arrest of Milošević in June 2001, he urged the Serbian government to extradite him to the International Criminal Tribunal for the Former Yugoslavia (ICTY) in The Hague.

== Politician ==
=== Democratic Party ===
==== Early years ====
Konstantinović joined the Democratic Party (DS) in 1998. He briefly left the party in 2003, when Otpor! became a registered political party in its own right. Konstantinović appeared in the 103rd position on Otpor!'s electoral list in the 2003 Serbian parliamentary election; the list failed to cross the electoral threshold to win assembly representation. After the election, he criticized Serbian prime minister Vojislav Koštunica's administration for including Milošević-era officials in its ranks.

Otpor! merged into the Democratic Party in September 2004, and Konstantinović signed an accord with DS official Slobodan Gavrilović to formalize the merger. He was a member of the DS executive from 2004 to 2008.

Konstantinović appeared in the ninth position on the DS's list for the City Assembly of Belgrade in the 2004 local elections and was elected when list won thirty-four seats. The DS formed a local coalition government after the election, and he served for the next four years as a supporter of the city administration.

==== Parliamentarian ====
Konstantinović appeared in the 103rd position on the DS's electoral list in the 2007 parliamentary election and was given a mandate when the list won sixty-four seats. (From 2000 to 2011, parliamentary mandates were awarded to sponsoring parties or coalitions rather than to individual candidates, and it was common practice for the mandates to be distributed out of numerical order. Konstantinović's position on the list – which was in any event mostly alphabetical – had no specific bearing on his chances of election.) After the election, the DS formed an unstable coalition government with the rival Democratic Party of Serbia (DSS) and G17 Plus, and Konstantinović served as a supporter of the administration. He was a member of the administrative committee and the committee for the judiciary and state administration.

The DS–DSS alliance broke down in early 2008, and a new parliamentary election was called for May 2008. The DS contested the election at the head of the For a European Serbia (ZES) alliance. Konstantinović appeared in the eighty-ninth position on its list (which was again mostly alphabetical) and was given a mandate when the list won a plurality victory with 102 out of 250 seats. The overall result of the election was inconclusive, but the ZES alliance ultimately formed a coalition government with the Socialist Party of Serbia (SPS), and Konstantinović again supported the administration. He was a member of the committee for justice and state administration and the committee for urban planning and construction; a deputy member of the committee on constitutional affairs, the committee on foreign affairs, and the committee for European integration; and a member of the parliamentary friendship group with the United States of America. In January 2009, he replaced Tomislav Nikolić as chair of the administrative committee. In this capacity, he initiated the launch of an "e-parliament" for the assembly. In the same period, he led a working group reviewing the assembly's code of conduct.

Serbia's electoral system was reformed in 2011, such that parliamentary mandates were awarded in numerical order to candidates on successful lists. Konstantinović was given the sixty-fourth position on the Democratic Party's Choice for a Better Life coalition list in the 2012 parliamentary election and was narrowly re-elected when the list won sixty-seven mandates. The Serbian Progressive Party (SNS) formed a new coalition government with the SPS and other parties after the election, and the DS moved into opposition. During his third term, Konstantinović was a member of the judiciary committee, (Note: Formally known as the Committee for the Judiciary, State Administration, and Local Self-Government.) a deputy member of the administrative committee (Note: Formally known as the Committee on Administrative, Budgetary, Mandate, and Immunity Issues.) and the security services control board, a deputy member of Serbia's delegation to the OSCE parliamentary assembly, and a member of the friendship groups with Croatia, Germany, Slovakia, the United Kingdom, and the United States.

Konstantinović did not seek re-election to the Belgrade city assembly in the 2008 local elections but instead appeared on the ZES list for the municipal assembly of Savski Venac, one of Belgrade's seventeen constituent municipalities. He received a mandate when the list won a plurality victory with seventeen out of twenty-seven seats. He was later given the eleventh position on the DS's list for Savski Venac in the 2012 local elections and was re-elected when the list won sixteen seats.

=== Social Democratic Party ===
After losing power, the DS became divided into rival wings led by Boris Tadić and Dragan Đilas. Tadić left the DS in early 2014 to form a breakaway group initially called the New Democratic Party (NDS), which contested the 2014 Serbian parliamentary election in a fusion with the Greens of Serbia (ZS) and in alliance with other parties. Konstantinović sided with Tadić and joined the NDS, appearing in the twenty-eighth position on its list. The list won eighteen mandates, and he was not re-elected to the assembly. He also received the largely honorary 105th position (out of 110) on the NDS's list in the 2014 Belgrade city assembly election. Election from this position was a mathematical impossibility, and the list did not cross the electoral threshold in any event. Later in the year, the NDS renamed itself as the Social Democratic Party (SDS).

The SDS contested the 2016 Serbian parliamentary election in a coalition with the Liberal Democratic Party (LDP) and the League of Social Democrats of Vojvodina (LSV). Konstantinović received the tenth position on the coalition's list and was re-elected to the assembly when it won thirteen seats. The SNS and its allies won a majority victory in the election, and the SDS served in opposition. In his fourth assembly term, Konstantinović was deputy chair of the administrative committee, a member of the spatial planning committee, (Note: Formally known as the Committee on Spatial Planning, Transport, Infrastructure, and Telecommunications.) a deputy member of the economy committee, (Note: Formally known as the Committee on the Economy, Regional Development, Trade, Tourism, and Energy.) and a member of the parliamentary friendship groups with Croatia, Germany, Italy, North Macedonia, Qatar, the United Kingdom, and the United States.

The SDS and the DS fielded a combined list in Savski Venac in the 2016 Serbian local elections. Konstantinović appeared in the lead position on the list and was re-elected when it won nine mandates. He did not seek re-election at the local level in 2020.

=== Serbia 21 ===
Serbia's centre-left opposition parties began boycotting the national assembly in 2019, charging that Serbian president Aleksandar Vučić and the SNS were undermining the country's democratic institutions. The SDS took part in the boycott and ultimately did not participate in the 2020 Serbian parliamentary election.

Konstantinović and fellow SDS parliamentarian Marko Đurišić joined a new organization called Serbia 21 in 2019. Boris Tadić denounced their decision, and both delegates subsequently left the SDS. In March 2020, Serbia 21 announced that it would participate in the upcoming parliamentary election with United Democratic Serbia (UDS), a coalition of mostly centre-left and pro-European Union parties that were opposed to the boycott. Konstantinović appeared in the second position on the UDS list. During the campaign, he argued that it was "only possible to change the system and to remove Vučić from power if we participate in the elections." Tadić, however, charged that Serbia 21 was legitimizing the SNS administration by taking part in the election and referred to the party as "Vučić's project." During the campaign, Konstantinović had to deny rumours that the Progressives collected signatures for the UDS electoral list to appear on the ballot. Ultimately, the UDS list did not cross the electoral threshold. Serbia 21 became inactive after the election.

Konstantinović criticized the "Serbia against violence" protests in May 2023, arguing that it was inappropriate to score political points after recent mass shootings in the country.
