= Milica Kirćanski =

Serbian politician (born 1958)

Milica Kirćanski (Serbian Cyrillic: Милица Кирћански; born 1958) is a politician in Serbia. She served in the Assembly of Vojvodina from 2016 to 2020 as a member of the Movement of Socialists (Pokret socijalista, PS).

== Private career ==
Kirćanski has a master's degree in the field of philological sciences. She lives in Novi Sad and has worked at the city's public library.

== Politician ==
Kirćanski was chosen as the leader of the PS's city board for Novi Sad in early 2014.

The PS has been part of the Serbian Progressive Party's electoral alliance at the republic level in Serbian and the provincial level in Vojvodina since 2012. Kirćanski received the fifty-seventh position on the Progressive-led electoral list in the 2016 provincial election and was elected when the list won a majority victory with sixty-three out of 120 seats. She served on the assembly committee on education and science and the committee on culture and public information.

Kirćanski was given the 102nd position on the Progressive-led Aleksandar Vučić — For Our Children list in the 2020 provincial election and was not re-elected even as the list won an increased majority with seventy-six seats. She is, however, the next in line to receive a mandate if another member of the Movement of Socialists leaves the assembly for any reason.
