= Mia Strajin =

Serbian politician

Mia Strajin (Serbian Cyrillic: Миа Страјин; born 1987) is a politician in Serbia. She has served in the Assembly of Vojvodina since 2016 as a member of the Serbian Progressive Party.

== Private career ==
Strajin holds a Bachelor of Laws degree. She lives in Novi Sad.

== Politician ==
Strajin received the twenty-fifth position on the Progressive Party's electoral list in the 2016 Vojvodina provincial election and was elected when the list won a majority victory with sixty-three out of 120 mandates. She subsequently became co-ordinator of the Women's Parliamentary Network in Vojvodina and, in this capacity, oversaw networking meetings with members of local assemblies. In 2019, she was given the Milica Tomić award in the field of gender equality.

She was promoted to the twentieth position on the Progressive list for the 2020 provincial election and was re-elected when the list won an increased majority with seventy-six mandates. She is now a member of the committee on European integration and interregional co-operation and the committee on administrative and mandatory issues.
