= Together for Vojvodina =

Together for Vojvodina (Serbian: Заједно за Војводину, Zajedno za Vojvodinu) may refer to:

- Together for Vojvodina (coalition), a defunct political coalition in Serbia
- Together for Vojvodina (party), a political party in Serbia led by Olena Papuga
