= Jovana Medenica =

Serbian politician

Jovana Medenica (Serbian Cyrillic: Јована Меденица; born 1989) is a politician in Serbia. She has served in the Assembly of Vojvodina since 2016. First elected as a candidate of United Serbia, she has been a member of the Serbian Progressive Party since late 2016.

== Private career ==
Medenica holds a Bachelor of Arts degree in Political Science. She lives in Novi Sad.

== Politician ==
=== United Serbia ===
Since 2008, United Serbia has been aligned with the Socialist Party of Serbia for all Serbian elections at the republic and provincial levels and most elections at the municipal level. Medenica appeared in the sixteenth position on the Socialist Party's electoral list in the 2016 Vojvodina provincial election and narrowly missed direct election when the list won twelve mandates. She received a mandate on 18 July 2016 as the replacement for another party member and, as United Serbia was providing outside support to Vojvodina's coalition government, was part of the administration's assembly majority.

Medicina also appeared on the Socialist Party's lists in the 2016 Serbian parliamentary election and the 2016 Novi Sad city election, although she was not elected in either circumstance.

=== Serbian Progressive Party ===
Medenica switched her affiliation to the Progressive Party shortly after receiving a mandate. She formally joined the Progressive Party's assembly group in April 2017. As the Progressives were the leading party in Vojvodina's coalition government, she continued to serve with its assembly majority.

She received the thirtieth position on the Progressive Party's Aleksandar Vučić — For Our Children coalition list in the 2020 provincial election and was elected to a second term when the list won a majority victory with seventy-six out of 120 mandates. She is now a member of the assembly committee on European integration and interregional co-operation and the committee on administrative and mandatory issues.
