= Ljubo Panić =

Serbian politician and administrator

Ljubo Panić (Serbian Cyrillic: Љубо Панић;рођен 1984 у Теслић) is a politician and administrator in Serbia. He served in the Assembly of Vojvodina from 2020 to 2021 as a member of the Serbian Progressive Party.

== Private career ==
Panić is a professor of physics and astronomy. He lives in Titel.

He was appointed as director of the public utility company Komunalac in Titel on 30 July 2015 and was re-appointed to another four-year term on 16 August 2019. He has overseen a number of infrastructure projects in this capacity, including the construction of a new municipal water tank.

== Politician ==
Panić received the fifty-seventh position on the Progressive-led Aleksandar Vučić — For Our Children electoral list in the 2020 Vojvodina provincial election and was elected when the list won a majority victory with seventy-six out of 120 mandates. He served on the committee on urbanism, spatial planning, and environmental protection and the committee on education and science.

Panić resigned from the assembly on 19 February 2021.
