= Jasmina Stevanović =

Serbian politician

Jasmina Stevanović (Serbian Cyrillic: Јасмина Стевановић; born 1972) is a politician in Serbia. She has served in the Assembly of Vojvodina since 2019. Previously a member of the Democratic Party of Serbia (Demokratska stranka Srbije, DSS), she has been a member of the Serbian Progressive Party (Srpska napredna stranka, SNS) since 2013.

== Private career ==
Stevanović holds a Bachelor of Arts degree in Political Science, with a focus in journalism and information. She lives in Subotica and is the secretary of the city's secretariat for social activities.

== Politician ==
=== Democratic Party of Serbia ===
Stevanović appeared in the sixth position on the DSS's electoral list for the Vojvodina provincial assembly in the 2012 provincial election. The list won four mandates, and she was not returned. In the concurrent 2012 Serbian local elections, the DSS ran a combined list in Subotica with the far-right Serbian Radical Party and the Serbian Democratic Party. Stevanović received the fourteenth position on their list and was not initially elected when the list won six mandates. She was, however, awarded a mandate on 21 March 2013 as the replacement for another DSS member.

=== Serbian Progressive Party ===
On 17 October 2013, the entire DSS group in the Subotica assembly, including Stevanović, joined the Serbian Progressive Party. In March 2014, she was appointed as chair of the city commission for the allocation of funds in the area of culture. She resigned from the local assembly on 5 May 2015.

Stevanović received the 195th position on the Progressive Party's Aleksandar Vučić — Future We Believe In electoral list in the 2014 Serbian parliamentary election and was not elected when the list won 158 mandates. She later appeared in the seventy-first position on the party's list for the Vojvodina assembly in the 2016 provincial election and did not initially win election despite the list winning a majority victory with won sixty-three out of 120 mandates. She was given a mandate on 28 May 2019, again as the replacement for another party member, and served with the Progressive-led government's parliamentary majority.

She was promoted to the twenty-ninth position on the Progressive Party's list in the 2020 provincial election and was elected to her first full term when the list won an increased majority with seventy-six mandates. She is now a member of the committee on culture and public information and the committee on health, social policy, labour, demographic policy, and social child care.
