= Nada Milanović =

Serbian politician

Nada Milanović (Serbian Cyrillic: Нада Милановић; born 1973) is a politician in Serbia. She served in the Assembly of Vojvodina from 2016 to 2020 and is currently a member of the municipal assembly of Pančevo. Milanović is a member of the Serbian Progressive Party.

== Private career ==
Milanović is a culturologist. She lives in Pančevo.

== Politician ==
=== Provincial politics ===
Milanović received the forty-ninth position on the Progressive Party's electoral list in the 2016 Vojvodina provincial election and was elected when the list won a majority victory with sixty-three out of 120 mandates. For the next four years, she served in the assembly as a supporter of the government.

She was given the eighty-first position on the Progressive-led Aleksandar Vučić — For Our Children list in the 2020 provincial election and narrowly missed direct election when the list won seventy-six mandates. She is currently the next in line to receive a mandate if another Progressive Party member leaves the assembly.

=== Municipal politics ===
Milanović was given the sixth position on the Progressive list for the Pančevo city assembly in the 2016 Serbian local elections and was elected when the list won a majority victory with thirty-nine out of seventy mandates. For the 2020 local elections, she was given the eighteenth position and was re-elected when the Progressive list won forty-seven mandates.
