= Together for Vojvodina (party) =

Political party in Serbia

Together for Vojvodina Заједно за Војводину Zajedno za Vojvodinu
- Abbreviation: ZZV
- President: Olena Papuga
- Founder: Olena Papuga
- Founded: 1 November 2011
- Registered: 8 December 2011
- Headquarters: Fruškogorska 95a, Ruski Krstur
- Ideology: Rusyn minority interests; Vojvodina autonomism
- Political position: Centre-left
- Colours: Green
- National Assembly: 0 / 250
- Assembly of Vojvodina: 0 / 120

Website
- zajednozavojvodinu.wordpress.com

Together for Vojvodina (Serbian: Заједно за Војводину, Zajedno za Vojvodinu, abbr. ZZV) is a political party in Serbia, representing the Rusyn minority in Vojvodina. It has been led by Olena Papuga since its formation in 2011.

In the National Assembly of Serbia, ZZV was represented by Papuga until 2020, while following the 2022 parliamentary election, ZZV has been represented by Aleksandar Olenik. ZZV retains close relations with the League of Social Democrats of Vojvodina, which Papuga is a member of. It is an autonomist party, while it also declares itself to be in favour of multiculturalism and the accession of Serbia to the European Union.

== History ==
Together for Vojvodina (ZZV) was founded on 1 November 2011 and it was registered as a political party on 8 December 2011. Olena Papuga, a League of Social Democrats of Vojvodina (LSV) member of the National Assembly, became the president of the party; she stated that she would retain her membership in LSV and that ZZV would act close to it. Papuga was listed as the 58th candidate on the Choice for a Better Life (IZBŽ) electoral list in the 2012 parliamentary election. The IZBŽ coalition won 67 seats; Papuga was re-elected as member of the National Assembly. ZZV later took part in the 2014 parliamentary election with LSV and the New Democratic Party, later known as Social Democratic Party (SDS); Papuga was listed as the third candidate on its list. The coalition received 18 seats in the National Assembly, with Papuga being re-elected.

In the 2016 parliamentary election, ZZV took part in a coalition with LSV, SDS, and the Liberal Democratic Party. Papuga was listed as the ninth candidate on the list. The coalition won 13 seats, with Papuga retaining her seat in the National Assembly. In December 2019, ZZV signed the "Memorandum on the Future of Vojvodina", a document in which the need for decentralisation and the establishment "of the true autonomy for Vojvodina" was stated. As part of the Vojvodina Front (VF), ZZV took part in the foundation of the United Democratic Serbia (UDS) coalition. UDS did not cross the 3% electoral threshold and Papuga lost her seat in the National Assembly, however VF won 3 seats in the City Assembly of Novi Sad.

In preparation for the 2022 parliamentary election, ZZV formed a coalition with the Democratic Alliance of Croats in Vojvodina (DSHV). A minority of members of the Republic Electoral Commission raised the suspicion of the coalition abusing the right to run as a national minority list because the candidates were from non-minority parties, primarily from LSV. This coalition received public support from LSV and the Vojvodina's Party. The ZZV–DSHV coalition, dubbed "Vojvodinians", campaigned on "bringing Vojvodina back to the National Assembly", while it also voiced support for progressive policies, multiculturalism, fiscal decentralisation, and opposition to "dirty technologies". One of its representatives, Tomislav Žigmanov of DSHV, stated that the coalition supports for the accession of Serbia to the European Union and NATO. The coalition won 2 seats in the National Assembly, one of which went to Aleksandar Olenik of ZZV. ZZV became part of the European Regions parliamentary group, which was chaired by Olenik. Žigmanov announced on 23 October 2022 that he accepted the position of becoming the minister of human and minority rights and social dialogue; Olenik then terminated the ZZV–DSHV coalition. The parliamentary group was dissolved two days later.

ZZV became part of a coalition composed of LSV and Democratic Fellowship of Vojvodina Hungarians in November 2023. The coalition announced that they would take part in the 2023 Vojvodina provincial election and that they would campaign on autonomism, decentralisation, improving healthcare, infrastructure, water systems, education, and rights of ethnic minorities.

== Political positions ==
ZZV represents the Rusyn ethnic minority in Serbia. It is an autonomist party. According to its political programme, ZZV is also supportive of multiculturalism, environmental protection, equal rights for the Rusyn ethnic minority, and the accession of Serbia to the European Union.

== Organisation ==
ZZV is led by Olena Papuga. Its headquarters are located at Fruškogorska 95a in Ruski Krstur.

=== List of presidents ===
#	President		Birth–Death	Term start	Term end
1	Olena Papuga	An image of Olena Papuga in 2022	1964–	1 November 2011	Incumbent

== Electoral performance ==
=== Parliamentary elections ===
Year	Leader	Popular vote	% of popular vote	#	# of seats	Seat change	Coalition	Status	Ref.
2012	Olena Papuga	873,294	23.09%	▲2nd	1 / 250	0	IZBŽ	Opposition	
2014	Olena Papuga	204,767	5.89%	▼4th	1 / 250	0	ZZV–NDS–ZS–LSV–ZZS	Opposition	
2016	Olena Papuga	189,564	5.17%	▼7th	1 / 250	0	ZZV–SDS–LSV–LDP	Opposition	
2020	Olena Papuga	30,591	0.99%	▼13th	0 / 250	▼1	UDS	Extra-parliamentary	
2022	Olena Papuga	24,024	0.65%	▼14th	1 / 250	▲1	ZZV–DSHV	Opposition	
2023	Olena Papuga	Did not participate			0 / 250	▼1	–	Extra-parliamentary	
2026	Olena Papuga	Did not participate			0 / 250	0	Supported SL	Extra-parliamentary	
