= Vojvodina Autonomist Movement =

Political movement in Serbia

The Vojvodina Autonomist Movement (Serbian: Војвођански аутономашки покрет, romanized: Vojvođanski autonomaški pokret), or colloquially the Autonomists (Serbian: Аутономаши, romanized: Autonomaši) is a political movement in the Serbian province of Vojvodina that advocates more autonomy for Vojvodina within Serbia.

== History ==
The roots of the autonomist movement date back to 1691, when the Habsburg Emperor recognized the right of the Serbs to have one separate autonomous voivodship within the Habsburg monarchy. The autonomy, however, was not realised at that time, and in 1790 (almost 100 years after the promise of the emperor), the Serbs organized their national assembly in Timișoara (present-day Romania), where they called for autonomy. These demands were, however, rejected by the Habsburgs.

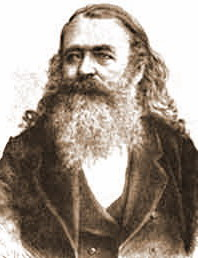
Svetozar Miletić (1826-1901), political leader of Serbs in Vojvodina

In 1848, as a response to the policy of the revolutionary Hungarian government, the Serbs, in accordance with the right given in 1691, proclaimed the creation of an autonomous region named the Serbian Vojvodina. This time, the autonomy was recognized by the Habsburg emperor, and in 1849, a separate Habsburg province named the Voivodeship of Serbia and Banat of Temeschwar was created as a political successor of the Serbian Vojvodina.

However, since the policy of the Habsburgs towards the Hungarians had changed, the Voivodeship of Serbia and Banat of Temeschwar was abolished in 1860, and most of its territory was incorporated into the Habsburg Kingdom of Hungary. As a response to the abolition of the voivodship, the Serbs in 1861 organized national assembly known as the Annunciation Council, where they called for reestablishment of the voivodship. The constitution of the voivodship was also adopted by the council. The Habsburg rulers, however, did not accept these Serb demands. Instead, the autonomy was in 1867 given to the Hungarians, and the Serbs found themselves in the Hungarian part of the newly-established Austria-Hungary. The political struggle for the autonomy of Vojvodina, however, was continued by the Serb deputies in the parliament of the Kingdom of Hungary, until the end of Austria-Hungary in 1918.

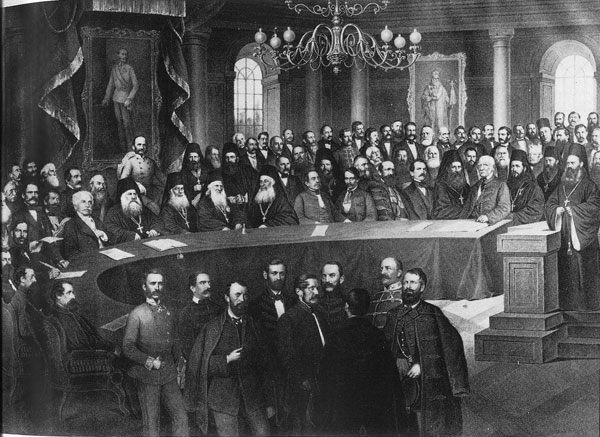
The Annunciation Council in Sremski Karlovci, 1861

A new opportunity for the autonomy of Vojvodina arose in 1918, after the collapse of the Austria-Hungary. On November 25, 1918, the Great People's Assembly of Serbs, Bunjevci, and other Slavs decided for unconditional unification of the region with the Kingdom of Serbia, as well as to form a new autonomous government of Vojvodina known as the People's Administration for Banat, Bačka, and Baranya. Although, the government in Belgrade accepted the decision that Vojvodina join to Serbia, it did not recognize the People's Administration. The People's Administration was active until March 11, 1919, when it held its last session.

Since autonomy was not realised, and the new Kingdom of Serbs, Croats, and Slovenes was a centralized country, the new autonomist movement emanated, again led by local Serbs. The Danube Banovina, a province of the Kingdom of Yugoslavia formed in 1929, did not have a significant degree of autonomy, thus the autonomist movement was also active after the creation of this province. The idea of an autonomous Vojvodina was also accepted by the Communist Party of Yugoslavia, and after occupation of Vojvodina by the Axis Powers in 1941, the Communist Party and its partisan resistance movement started the armed struggle against the occupation. The aim of this struggle, as it was presented by the Communist Party, was the autonomous Vojvodina in which all ethnic groups would be equal. The Serbs, who were the main victims of the Axis regimes, as well as other ethnic groups of Vojvodina, participated in this struggle, and after the end of the war, the Autonomous Province of Vojvodina was established, within the Socialist Republic of Serbia which was in turn a constituent republic of Yugoslav federation.

Flag of Vojvodina as proposed by the League of Social Democrats of Vojvodina in the 1990s and still in some limited use today

After much of the autonomy of Vojvodina was reduced by Slobodan Milošević in 1990, the new movement for autonomy of the province emanated, supported by both the local Serbs as well as the ethnic minorities. The view of the autonomist movement was that the revoking of the autonomy in 1990 had severely weakened the regional economy, thus, for the strengthening of the economy, one of preconditions was for province to get more autonomy from central government in Belgrade. Unlike the political movement of Kosovar Albanians, the autonomist movement in Vojvodina never aimed for secession from Serbia, but for a significant level of autonomy. There were various views among autonomist proponents about the desired level of autonomy of Vojvodina. Some advocate for returning to the level of autonomy as it was provided by the 1974 Yugoslav Constitution, while others supported the idea of somewhat lesser level of autonomy than that. One of the proposals included the one put forward by the League of Social Democrats of Vojvodina, which advocated the transformation of Serbia into a federal state with federal units having varying degrees of autonomy. One of the federal units, according to the proposal, would be the Republic of Vojvodina while others would be Šumadija and Western Serbia, Southern and Eastern Serbia, Belgrade, Sandžak, and Kosovo. In recent years, the League of Social Democrats of Vojvodina mostly abandoned the idea of a Republic of Vojvodina, but is still advocating for a higher level of autonomy for the province.

Popular support for autonomist movement in Vojvodina has been relatively low in the last two decades due to a combination of political and social factors. The partial restoration of autonomy in 2002 and the adoption of the Statute of Vojvodina in 2008 provided some self-governance, but it fell far short of the pre-1990 levels. Many residents perceive the current level of autonomy as sufficient, reducing the urgency for stronger autonomist push. Main autonomist political party, the League of Social Democrats of Vojvodina, have not gained significant votes to pass the threshold in recent elections and are not currently represented in the Assembly of Vojvodina. This lack of strong political voices limits the visibility and momentum of the autonomist movement, dampening public enthusiasm. While call for more autonomy retains some appeal (although without backing on a scale it had during the 1990s), it is often seen as a niche issue, overshadowed by national political issues like corruption and economic challenges. The lack of widespread grassroots movements or public discourse about autonomy suggests it is not a pressing concern for most residents.

== Autonomist political parties ==
The main autonomist political party is the League of Social Democrats of Vojvodina, mostly led and supported by local Vojvodinian Serb population.

There are also several political parties of ethnic minorities, some of which, aside from supporting rights of ethnic minorities, are also supporting the idea of more autonomy for Vojvodina, an example of which is the Rusyn minority party Together for Vojvodina.

Autonomist political parties have not gained significant traction in recent elections and are not currently represented in the Assembly of Vojvodina, thus limiting the visibility and momentum of the autonomist movement.

=== Elections results ===
Provincial elections
Year	Party or coalition	Votes	Share	Seats
2004	Together for Vojvodina	60,389	9.8%	7
2004	Clean Hands of Vojvodina	14,666	2.4%	2
2004	TOTAL:	75,055	12.2%	9
2008	Together for Vojvodina	86,653	8.5%	6
2008	Vojvodina's Party	6,996	0.7%	0
2008	TOTAL:	93,649	9.2%	6
2012	League of Social Democrats of Vojvodina	111,397	11.6%	10
2016	League of Social Democrats of Vojvodina	61,979	6.6%	9
2016	Vojvodina Tolerance	4,943	0.5%	0
2016	TOTAL:	66,922	7.2%	9
2020	Vojvodina Front	41,455	5.3%	6
2023	Vojvodinians	24,625	2.6%	0

National elections in Vojvodina
Year	Party or coalition	Votes	Share
2014	NDS–LSV–ZZS–VMDK–ZZV–DLR	72,299	8.1%
2016	Alliance for a Better Serbia	63,338	6.5%
2020	United Democratic Serbia	20,775	2.4%
2022	Together for Vojvodina	21,703	2.1%

== See also ==
- Politics of Vojvodina
