= Democratic Party of Macedonians =

Political party in Serbia

Democratic Party of Macedonians Демократска партија на македонците Демократска партија Македонаца
- Abbreviation: DPM
- Leader: Nenad Krsteski
- Founded: 15 November 2004; 21 years ago
- Headquarters: Pančevo
- Ideology: Macedonian minority interests
- Colors: Yellow
- National Assembly: 0 / 250
- Assembly of Vojvodina: 0 / 120
- City Assembly of Belgrade: 0 / 110

Website
- dpm-srbija.rs

Democratic Party of Macedonians (Macedonian: Демократска партија на македонците, Serbian: Демократска партија Македонаца, romanized: Demokratska partija Makedonaca, DPM) is a political party in Serbia representing the Macedonian ethnic minority.

== History ==
Democratic Party of Macedonians was founded in 2004 with the purpose of representing the interests of Macedonians in Serbia. In 2020 Serbian parliamentary election, the party participated in the coalition with the Justice and Reconciliation Party, and its leader Muamer Zukorlić winning 1% managing to pass the national minorities census to enter the National Assembly.

== Electoral history ==
=== Parliamentary elections ===
National Assembly of Serbia
Year	Popular vote	% of popular vote	# of seats	Seat change	Coalition	Government
2012		25%	1 / 250	▲1	With Let's Get Serbia Moving	Government Support
2020	32,170	1.00%	0 / 250	Steady	With SPP	non-parliamentary
2022	Did not participate		0 / 250			non-parliamentary
