= Vojvodina Front (Yugoslavia) =

Vojvodina Front (Serbian: Војвођански фронт) was a diverse oppositional group of political parties in the Danube Banovina in historical regions of Syrmia, Bačka, Banat and Baranya which advocated for federalization of the interwar Kingdom of Yugoslavia in which Vojvodina would be one of the constituent federal units. The first initiative to establish the front come in 1928 yet the first formal meetings of the group were organized in 1935 after the publication of Sombor Resolution and Novi Sad Resolution. The Front was weakened over the time and eventually not a single of its candidates was elected into Parliament of Yugoslavia at the time of 1938 Yugoslavian parliamentary election.

While Yugoslav National Party strongly opposed Front's proposals and Democratic Party considered it exclusively administrative and not constitutional issue, Agrarian Party showed limited support while Peasant-Democratic Coalition of the Croatian Peasant Party and Independent Democratic Party supported the requests of the Front. At the same time Independent Democratic Party considered requests to be motivated by the issue of economic exploitation and comparatively excessive taxation of the region and not as a separatist initiative as the Front was dominated by Serbs in Vojvodina. The front was supported by then prohibited Communist Party of Yugoslavia as well.

== See also ==
- Banat, Bačka and Baranja
- Prečani (Serbs)
- Creation of Yugoslavia
- Zagreb Points
