= Party of Modern Serbia =

Political party in Serbia

Party of Modern Serbia Странка модерне Србије Stranka moderne Srbije
- Abbreviation: SMS
- President: Collective leadership
- Legal representative: Nebojša Leković
- Founded: 14 December 2018; 7 years ago
- Merger of: Centre Movement; Social Democratic Alliance
- Split from: Enough is Enough
- Headquarters: Francuska 24, Belgrade
- Ideology: Liberalism; Decentralisation; Pro-Europeanism
- Political position: Centre
- Colours: Purple
- National Assembly: 0 / 250
- Assembly of Vojvodina: 0 / 120
- City Assembly of Belgrade: 0 / 110

Website
- moderna.org.rs

The Party of Modern Serbia (Serbian: Странка модерне Србије, romanised: Stranka moderne Srbije, abbr. SMS) is a liberal political party in Serbia. It was formed in December 2018 through the merger of the Centre Movement, founded by former MPs of Enough is Enough, with the Social Democratic Alliance, and is led by a collective presidency.

SMS had MPs in the National Assembly until 2020, when it contested the parliamentary election in the United Democratic Serbia coalition, which failed to win seats. It has not taken part in a parliamentary election since, but remains entered in the Register of Political Parties.

== History ==
In May 2018, five MPs who had left the parliamentary group of Enough is Enough formed the Centre Movement (Pokret centra). After negotiations with the Social Democratic Alliance (Socijaldemokratski savez), the two merged into the Party of Modern Serbia, whose registration was completed by a decision of the Ministry of Public Administration and Local Self-Government on 14 December 2018. At its founding congress on 23 December, SMS elected a three-member presidency of Tatjana Macura, Nebojša Leković and Aleksandar Stevanović. It said it would advocate entrepreneurship and the development of small and medium-sized enterprises, and that it saw Serbia "in the West". At the time, it had five MPs in the National Assembly and three in the Assembly of Vojvodina, as well as local councillors in several municipalities. A sixth MP joined the party in January 2019.

SMS supported the protests against Aleksandar Vučić and took part in the opposition negotiations in early 2019. In April 2019, it signed a cooperation agreement with the Civic Democratic Forum (GDF), and in February 2020 it joined a "European bloc" with GDF, the League of Social Democrats of Vojvodina and other organisations. With Serbia 21, the bloc contested the 2020 parliamentary election as United Democratic Serbia, winning 0.99% of the vote, which left SMS without seats. In August 2020, SMS denied reports that it was forming a new opposition bloc with the Movement of Free Citizens, the Liberal Democratic Party and the New Party.

SMS did not take part in the 2022, 2023 or 2026 parliamentary elections. Co-president Tatjana Macura was included on the Serbian Progressive Party's list, "Aleksandar Vučić – Serbia Must Not Stop", in the 2023 election. As of November 2026, SMS remains entered in the Register of Political Parties, with Leković as its legal representative.

== Presidency ==
SMS is led by a collective presidency.

No.	Name	Born	Term start	Term end
1	Tatjana Macura	1981	23 December 2018	2020
1	Nebojša Leković	1964	23 December 2018	Incumbent
1	Aleksandar Stevanović	1976	23 December 2018	Incumbent

== Electoral history ==
=== Parliamentary elections ===
National Assembly of Serbia
Year	Leader	Popular vote	% of popular vote	#	# of seats	Seat change	Coalition	Status
2020	Collective leadership	30,591	0.99%	13th	0 / 250	▼6	UDS	Extra-parliamentary
2022	Collective leadership	Did not participate			0 / 250	0	–	Extra-parliamentary
2023	Collective leadership	Did not participate			0 / 250	0	–	Extra-parliamentary
2026	Collective leadership	Did not participate			0 / 250	0	–	Extra-parliamentary

== See also ==
- Liberalism in Serbia
- List of political parties in Serbia
