= Serbia 21 =

Political party in Serbia

Serbia 21 Србија 21 Srbija 21
- Abbreviation: S21
- President: Marko Đurišić
- Founders: Marko Đurišić; Nenad Konstantinović
- Founded: February 2020
- Dissolved: after July 2020
- Split from: Social Democratic Party
- Ideology: Social liberalism
- Political position: Centre to centre-left
- National affiliation: United Democratic Serbia
- Colours: Cyan
- Slogan: "Za Evropsku Srbiju" ("For European Serbia")
- National Assembly: 0 / 250
- Assembly of Vojvodina: 0 / 120
- City Assembly of Belgrade: 0 / 110

Website
- srbija21.rs

Serbia 21 (Serbian Cyrillic: Србија 21, romanised: Srbija 21, abbr. S21) was a political organisation in Serbia. It was founded in early 2020 by former members of the Social Democratic Party (SDS) and Democratic Party (DS).

== History ==
Marko Đurišić and Nenad Konstantinović were previously a part of the Social Democratic Party (SDS) but after the party stated that they will boycott the upcoming elections they decided to create a new political organisation which will participate in the next elections and which will also focus on the Serbian accession to the European Union. After some time they were also supported by Gordana Čomić of the Democratic Party (DS). The party participated in the 2020 parliamentary election, and they stated multiple times that "it is only possible to change the system and to remove Vučić from power if we participate in the elections". Boris Tadić, the president of the Social Democratic Party, has classified the organisation as "Vučić's project". By the time of the election, the organisation had two MPs and a joint parliamentary group with Vojvodina Front.

They were also a part of the United Democratic Serbia (UDS) coalition, together with Party of Modern Serbia (SMS), League of Social Democrats of Vojvodina (LSV)-led Vojvodina Front and the Civic Democratic Forum (GDF). The organisation has remained inactive since the 2020 parliamentary election.

== Electoral performance ==
=== Parliamentary elections ===
National Assembly of Serbia
Year	Popular vote	% of popular vote	# of seats	Seat change	Coalitions	Government
2020	30,591	0.95%	0 / 250	▼2	UDS	Extra-parliamentary
