= Zoran Vuletić (politician) =

Serbian politician

- Зоран Вулетић
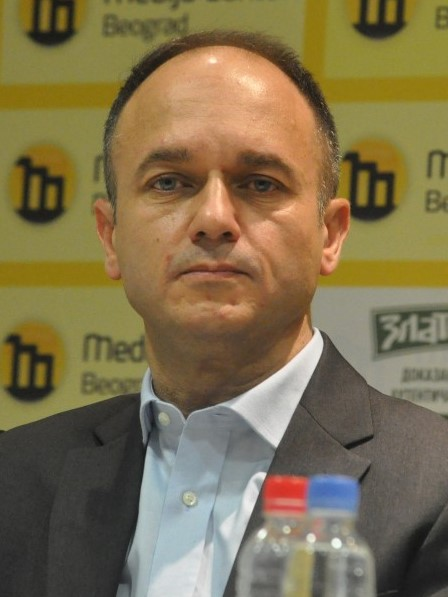

President of the Civic Democratic Forum
- Incumbent
- Assumed office 3 October 2020
- Preceded by: Aleksandar Olenik

Personal details
- Born: 5 May 1970 (age 54); Kragujevac, SR Serbia, SFR Yugoslavia
- Political party: LDP (2005–2017); PSG (2017–2019); GDF (2019–present)
- Occupation: Politician

Zoran Vuletić (Serbian Cyrillic: Зоран Вулетић; born 5 May 1970) is a Serbian politician. For many years a leading member of the Liberal Democratic Party (LDP), he is now the president of the Civic Democratic Forum (Građanski demokratski forum, GDF).

== Early life and private career ==
Vuletić was born in Kragujevac, in what was then the Socialist Republic of Serbia in the Socialist Federal Republic of Yugoslavia, and was raised in Zvezdara, Belgrade. He attended the University of Belgrade Faculty of Agriculture and has worked at Agromarket Beograd since 1998.

== Political career ==
=== Liberal Democratic Party ===
Vuletić became politically active in 1991 and took part in civic protests against Slobodan Milošević's administration. He joined the Liberal Democratic Party (LDP) on its formation in 2005 and was elected to its main board shortly thereafter. He was chosen as leader of the party's organisation in Zvezdara in 2007, became a trustee of its Belgrade city organisation in 2012, and joined the party's presidency in 2013. He also served on the party's steering committee.

In July 2008, he was interviewed by the Australian Broadcasting Corporation about the recent arrest of former Bosnian Serb leader Radovan Karadžić. He said that he hoped that the arrest would bring forward a real discussion about war crimes committed in the Yugoslav Wars of the 1990s, although he expressed scepticism that this would happen.

He was elected to the Zvezdara municipal assembly in the 2008 Belgrade city and municipal elections; the LDP joined a local governing coalition after the election, and Vuletić was appointed as deputy mayor. He was re-elected in the 2012 city and municipal elections at the head of the local electoral list for the Preokret coalition (which included the LDP) and was later confirmed as deputy mayor for a second term. He won a third term in the 2016 municipal elections at the head of a combined LDP–Social Democratic Party (Socijaldemokratska stranka, SDS) list; the LDP did not participate in the new coalition government and he stood down from the deputy mayor position accordingly. He subsequently resigned from the assembly.

Vuletić also sought election to the Assembly of the City of Belgrade in the 2008 and 2012 elections. In the former instance, he was not selected for a city mandate by the LDP; in the latter, the Preokret coalition did not cross the electoral threshold to win representation in the city assembly.

At the republic level, Vuletić appeared on the forty-seventh position on the LDP's list in the 2008 Serbian parliamentary election. The list won fifteen seats, and he was not selected for a mandate. (From 2000 to 2011, parliamentary mandates were awarded to sponsoring parties or coalitions rather than to individual candidates, and it was common practice for the mandates to be distributed out of numerical order. Vuletić could have received a mandate despite his relatively list low position, although in the event he did not.)

Serbia's electoral system was reformed in 2011, such that mandates were awarded in numerical order to candidates on successful lists. Vuletić was given the 247th position (out of 250) on Preokret's list in the 2012 Serbian parliamentary election. This was obviously too low a position for election to be a realistic prospect, and indeed he was not elected. He later received the fifty-seventh position on a combined list of the LDP, the SDS, and the League of Social Democrats of Vojvodina (LSV) for the 2016 parliamentary election and was again not elected when the list won thirteen mandates.

=== Movement of Free Citizens ===
Vuletić joined the PSG on its foundation in 2017 and was appointed as the party's acting trustee for Belgrade in December of that year. He later became a member of its presidency.

He received the nineteenth position on a coalition list led by Dragan Đilas that included the PSG in the 2018 Belgrade City Assembly election and was elected when the list won twenty-six seats. The Serbian Progressive Party and its allies won the election, and the PSG serves in opposition. On 9 May 2018, Vuletić announced that the PSG would not join Đilas's Alliance for Serbia assembly group due to political differences; he added that the PSG's primary goal would be promoting European integration.

In July 2018, Vuletić indicated the PSG was seeking allies with like-minded parties and organisations in Serbia to challenge the Progressive Party government at the republic level. He spoke against the idea of a united opposition with right-wing and nationalist organisations, saying that any alliance would need to be with organisations that respected civil society and the equality of all citizens. He added that he was disappointed in the Democratic Party's willingness to work with right-wing parties.

In 2019 after the leadership elections in the Movement of Free Citizens (PSG), he left PSG.

=== Civic Democratic Forum ===
In 2019 after the leadership elections in the Movement of Free Citizens (PSG), he left with an unsuccessful candidate Aleksandar Olenik and founded Civic Democratic Forum (GDF) with other former members of PSG. In 2020 he succeeded Olenik as the president of GDF.
