= Saša Šućurović =

Serbian politician

Saša Šućurović (Serbian Cyrillic: Саша Шућуровић; born 1968) is a Serbian politician. He was mayor of Novi Bečej, Vojvodina, from 2012 to 2016 and has served in the Assembly of Vojvodina since November 2016 as a member of the League of Social Democrats of Vojvodina (LSV).

== Private career ==
Šućurović is an entrepreneur.

== Political career ==
=== Liberal Democratic Party ===
Šućurović was a prominent member of Serbia's Liberal Democratic Party (LDP) for many years, appearing as a candidate on its electoral lists in the 2007, 2008, 2012, and 2014 Serbian parliamentary elections and the 2008 Vojvodina provincial election, although he did not receive a mandate on any of these occasions. He was an assistant to Novi Bečej mayor Milivoj Vrebalov following the 2008 Serbian local elections and was himself chosen as mayor after the 2012 elections with the support of twenty out of thirty-one members in the local assembly. In this capacity, he supported construction of a docking facility to improve tourism opportunities in the community.

=== League of Social Democrats of Vojvodina ===
Šućurović left the LDP in September 2015 following a period of tension with the party establishment and joined the LSV on the same day. In April 2016, he refuted Vojvodina president Bojan Pajtić's suggestion that his municipal administration was obstructing the restoration of Heterlend Castle. His term as mayor came to an end in June of the same year when the Serbian Progressive Party formed a new local administration.

The LSV contested the 2016 Serbian parliamentary election in alliance with the LDP and the Social Democratic Party (SDS). Šućurović received the 235th position out of 250 on their combined electoral list; this was too low a position for election to be a realistic prospect.

Šućurović also received the thirteenth position on the LSV's list in the concurrent 2016 Vojvodina provincial election and was not initially elected when the party won nine mandates. He was, however, awarded a mandate on 24 November 2016 as a replacement for Đorđe Stojšić, who had resigned. The election was won by the Progressive Party and its allies, and Šućurović serves with the opposition. He is currently a member of the committee on budget and finance, and the committee on petitions and motions.
