= Aleksandar Stevanović (politician) =

Serbian politician

Aleksandar Stevanović (Serbian Cyrillic: Александар Стевановић; born 1976) is a Serbian economist and politician. He has served in the National Assembly of Serbia since 2016, initially as a member of the It's Enough – Restart (Dosta je bilo, DJB) association, better known in English by the name "Enough Is Enough." He is now part of the three-member collective presidency of the Party of Modern Serbia.

== Private and civil career ==
Stevanović has two master's degrees in economics, respectively in transition and reconstruction and in political theories and practices of democracy. In the late 2000s and early 2010s, he was a researcher and associate at Serbia's Free Market Centre and was frequently cited in the country's media promoting neoliberal economic viewpoints and advocating for the privatization of state enterprises. In 2011, he charged that a lack of transparency in financial transactions involving energy was hindering investment from European countries. Later in the same year, he argued that Serbia's declining population was not the result of poverty or a lack of state financial support; in this context, he was quoted as saying, "I do not think it is wise to create 'professional parents,' as they do in the United Kingdom, and so generate welfare cases."

He was an advisor to Serbia's ministry of economy in 2013–14, during Saša Radulović's tenure as a non-partisan, technocratic minister in Ivica Dačić's government. In November 2013, Stevanović indicated that the ministry would set aside twelve billion dinars in credit guarantees to be extended to private companies, as part of a strategy toward abolishing direct state subsidies. He also indicated that twenty billion dinars would be set aside to provide minimum wages and severance payments to workers affected by restructuring; he was quoted as saying, "These funds are sufficient to avoid social problems and it is important to stress that the poor work of the managers of those companies will not become a burden for the employees."

Stevanović has, among other things, also served as president of the Serbian Association of Small and Medium Enterprises and been an advisor to Serbia's ambassador to Israel, the International Labour Organization, the European Liberal Democrat and Reform Party (ELDR), and other groups. He lives in Belgrade.

== Political career ==
Stevanović joined Radulović's DJB association in 2014 and received the fourth position on its electoral list in that year's parliamentary election. The list did not cross the electoral threshold to win representation in the National Assembly. He received the same position in the 2016 election and was elected when the list won sixteen mandates. The election was won by the Serbian Progressive Party and its allies, and the DJB entered the assembly as opposition members.

In March 2018, Stevanović indicated that he supported the position of Serbian president Aleksandar Vučić on the need for Serbs in Kosovo and Metohija to participate in the political process of the disputed territory under the terms of the Brussels Agreement. The DJB, which opposes this position, distanced itself from Stevanović's statement. Shortly thereafter, he was expelled from the association. Stevanović subsequently charged that Radulović had turned the party to the isolationist right and indicated his support for Tatjana Macura's ultimately abortive bid to succeed him as association leader. Stevanović later joined the breakaway Free MPs parliamentary group under Macura's leadership.

All members of the Free MPs parliamentary group also joined a new political group called the Movement of the Center. In December 2018, this group merged with the Social Democratic Union to create the Party of Modern Serbia. Stevanović was selected as an inaugural member of the group's three-member collective presidency.

Before leaving DJB, Stevanović was a member of the assembly's European integration committee and its committee on spatial planning, transport, infrastructure, and telecommunications; a deputy member of the foreign affairs committee and the committee on the economy, regional development, trade, tourism, and energy; and a member of Serbia's delegation to Parliamentary Assembly of the Francophonie (where Serbia has observer status). His was also part of Serbia's delegation to the Parliamentary Assembly of the Council of Europe (PACE), where he served with the Alliance of Liberals and Democrats for Europe group and was a member on the committee on migration, refugees, and displaced persons; a member of the sub-committee on integration; and an alternate member of the committee on equality and non-discrimination. He lost all of these positions following his expulsion from the movement.
