= Civic Democratic Forum =

Political organisation in Serbia

Civic Democratic Forum Грађански демократски форум Građanski demokratski forum
- Abbreviation: GDF
- President: Zoran Vuletić
- Founder: Aleksandar Olenik
- Founded: 2 March 2019; 7 years ago
- Split from: Movement of Free Citizens
- Headquarters: Birčaninova 2A, Belgrade
- Ideology: Liberalism; Pro-Europeanism; Atlanticism
- Political position: Centre
- Colours: Purple; Orange
- National Assembly: 0 / 250
- Assembly of Vojvodina: 0 / 120
- City Assembly of Belgrade: 0 / 110

Website
- gdf.org.rs

The Civic Democratic Forum (Serbian: Грађански демократски форум, romanised: Građanski demokratski forum, abbr. GDF) is a liberal political organisation in Serbia. Although it takes part in elections, it is constituted as an association (udruženje) under the Law on Associations and is not entered in the Register of Political Parties. It was founded in 2019 by former members of the Movement of Free Citizens (PSG), led by Aleksandar Olenik, and has been led by Zoran Vuletić since 2020. It opposes the rule of Aleksandar Vučić, although it has also criticised other opposition parties.

GDF has not won seats in the National Assembly, although it had six councillors in the City Assembly of Belgrade who had been elected on the Movement of Free Citizens' list. It contested the 2020 parliamentary election in the United Democratic Serbia coalition and the 2023 election in the "Serbia in the West" coalition, and did not take part in the 2026 election.

== History ==
After Saša Janković resigned as president of the Movement of Free Citizens, actor Sergej Trifunović and Aleksandar Olenik stood to succeed him, while Rade Veljanovski served as interim president. After Trifunović won with 60% of the vote, Veljanovski, Olenik and several other members left the movement, and on 2 March 2019 they founded the Civic Democratic Forum as a new political organisation, with Olenik as president; he said that European integration and "Serbia in the West" defined its programme. Its statute defines it as a non-governmental, non-profit association.

In April 2019, GDF signed a cooperation agreement with the Party of Modern Serbia (SMS). In May 2019, the two parties presented two models for resolving the Kosovo issue: upgrading the Brussels Agreement with a new document, with the recognition of Kosovo's sovereignty left until Kosovo met the conditions for joining the European Union, or a demarcation, acceptable only if both sides supported it, followed by mutual recognition within new borders. Olenik said that the question was no longer whether Serbia would recognise Kosovo's independence, but when and how.

In February 2020, GDF formed a "European bloc" with SMS, the League of Social Democrats of Vojvodina and other organisations. Together with the newly formed Serbia 21, the bloc contested the 2020 parliamentary election as United Democratic Serbia, which won less than 1% of the vote and no seats. Olenik resigned as president over the poor result, and on 3 October 2020 an extraordinary party assembly elected Zoran Vuletić, previously the president of the executive board, by 31 votes to 16 for Rade Veljanovski. GDF cooperated with Together for Serbia and its leader Nebojša Zelenović until early 2021.

In January 2022, GDF announced that it would not take part in the parliamentary election but would run independently in the Belgrade City Assembly election. It ultimately did not field a list in either election, instead backing the We Must coalition and its presidential candidate, Biljana Stojković. For the 2023 parliamentary and Belgrade City Assembly elections, it formed the "Serbia in the West" (Srbija na zapadu, SNZ) coalition with the New Party–D2SP, Liberals and Democrats, and The Voice, headed by Vuletić. The coalition won 0.15% of the vote in the parliamentary election and 0.25% in Belgrade. GDF did not take part in the 2024 Belgrade election.

GDF did not field a list in the 2026 snap parliamentary election. During the campaign, Vuletić described the Student List's programme as "populism and demagoguery" without a sound economic basis, and said that its leaders did not understand Serbia's relations with its neighbours, particularly Bosnia and Herzegovina.

== Ideology ==
GDF describes itself as a civic alternative advocating "Serbia in the West", the rule of law, respect for human rights and lustration. Its programme calls for the restoration of state institutions, a genuine separation of powers, a foreign policy that includes European integration and good relations with neighbouring countries, reform of the electoral system to guarantee free and fair elections, and decentralisation. Vuletić has accused successive Serbian governments of claiming to be pro-European while obstructing Serbia's accession to the European Union.

== Presidents ==
No.	President	Born	Term start	Term end
1	Aleksandar Olenik	1973	2 March 2019	3 October 2020
2	Zoran Vuletić	1970	3 October 2020	Incumbent

== Electoral history ==
=== Parliamentary elections ===
National Assembly of Serbia
Year	Leader	Popular vote	% of popular vote	#	# of seats	Seat change	Coalition	Status
2020	Aleksandar Olenik	30,591	0.99%	13th	0 / 250	0	UDS	Extra-parliamentary
2022	Zoran Vuletić	Did not participate			0 / 250	0	Supported Moramo	Extra-parliamentary
2023	Zoran Vuletić	5,462	0.15%	▼17th	0 / 250	0	SNZ	Extra-parliamentary
2026	Zoran Vuletić	Did not participate			0 / 250	0	–	Extra-parliamentary

=== Presidential elections ===
President of Serbia
Year	Candidate	1st round popular vote	% of popular vote	2nd round popular vote	% of popular vote	Notes	Ref.
2022	Biljana Stojković	122,378	3.30%	—		Supported We Must candidate	

=== Belgrade City Assembly elections ===
City Assembly of Belgrade
Year	Leader	Popular vote	% of popular vote	#	# of seats	Seat change	Coalition	Status
2022	Zoran Vuletić	Did not participate			0 / 110	▼6 (Note: GDF had six councillors elected in the 2018 election on the list led by the Movement of Free Citizens.)	–	Extra-parliamentary
2023	Zoran Vuletić	2,324	0.25%	13th	0 / 110	0	SNZ	Extra-parliamentary
2024	Zoran Vuletić	Did not participate			0 / 110	0	–	Extra-parliamentary

== See also ==
- Liberalism in Serbia
- List of political parties in Serbia
