= Marko Đurišić (politician) =

Serbian politician

- Марко Ђуришић
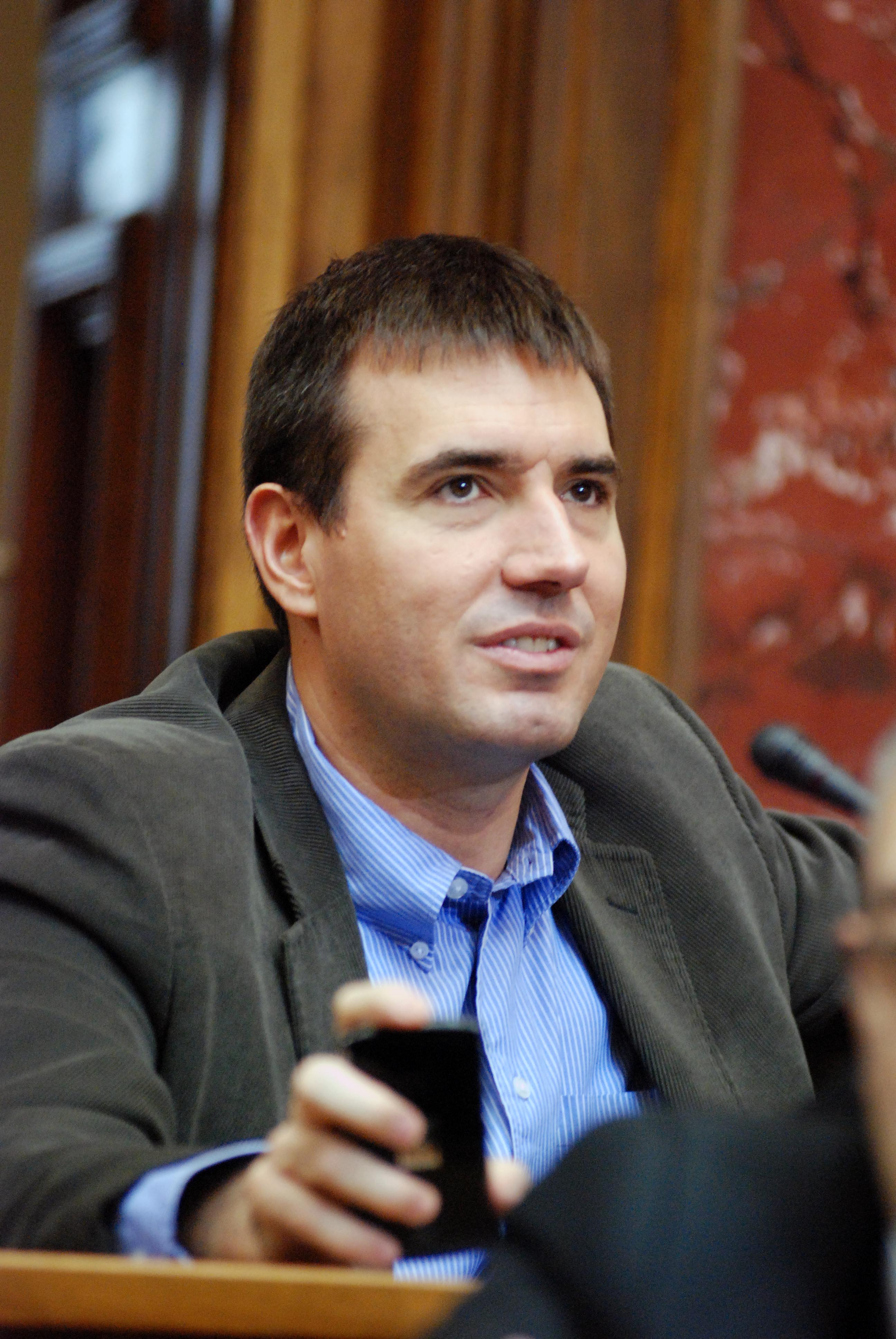

Member of the National Assembly of the Republic of Serbia
- In office 16 April 2014 – 3 August 2020
- In office 22 May 2007 – 31 May 2012
- In office 17 February 2004 – 14 February 2007
- In office 22 January 2001 – 27 January 2004

Member of the City Assembly of Belgrade
- In office 21 February 1997 – 26 November 2004

Personal details
- Born: November 2, 1968 (age 57) Belgrade, SR Serbia, SFR Yugoslavia
- Party: DS (1990–2014); NDS/SDS (2014–2020); Serbia 21 (2020)
- Occupation: Politician, engineer

Marko Đurišić (Serbian Cyrillic: Марко Ђуришић; born 2 November 1968) is a Serbian politician. He has served several terms in the National Assembly of Serbia, originally as a member of the Democratic Party (DS) and later with the breakaway Social Democratic Party (SDS). In 2020, he left the SDS and was a leading figure in the short-lived party Serbia 21.

== Early life and career ==
Đurišić was born in Belgrade, in what was then the Socialist Republic of Serbia in the Socialist Federal Republic of Yugoslavia. He is an information technology engineer.

== Politician ==
=== Democratic Party ===
==== Member of the Belgrade city assembly (1997–2004) ====
The DS contested the 1996 Serbian local elections as part of the Together (Zajedno) coalition with the Serbian Renewal Movement (SPO) and the Civic Alliance of Serbia (GSS). All three parties were opposed to Slobodan Milošević's continued rule in Serbia. Zajedno won a significant victory in the Belgrade city elections, and Đurišić was one of the DS candidates elected under its banner. The Serbian government initially refused to recognize the opposition's victory but accepted the outcome in early 1997 following extended street protests. The city assembly convened in February 1997, and DS leader Zoran Đinđić became Belgrade's mayor. The coalition's triumph was short-lived; the SPO left Zajedno later in the year, Đinđić was removed as mayor, and the DS moved into opposition. Đurišić took part in public protests against Milošević in July 1999, after the NATO bombing of Yugoslavia.

In 2000, the DS became one of the leading parties in the Democratic Opposition of Serbia (DOS), a broad and ideologically diverse coalition of parties opposed to the Milošević regime. DOS candidate Vojislav Koštunica defeated Milošević in the 2000 Yugoslavian presidential election, and Milošević fell from power on October 5 after further demonstrations. The DOS also won a landslide victory in the Belgrade city assembly in the concurrent 2000 Serbian local elections. Đurišić was re-elected to the assembly for New Belgrade's third division and served as a supporter of the local government for the next four years. He was also elected to the New Belgrade municipal assembly, where the DOS won sixty-five out of sixty-seven seats.

Serbia adopted a system of proportional representation for local elections in 2002. Đurišić appeared on the DS's electoral lists for the Belgrade city assembly and the New Belgrade municipal assembly in the 2004 local elections but was not given a mandate for a new term in either body.

==== Parliamentarian (2001–12) ====
The Serbian government fell after Milošević's defeat in the 2000 Yugoslavian election, and new Serbian parliamentary election was called for December 2000. Đurišić received the ninety-fourth position on the DOS's list and was awarded a mandate when the alliance won a landslide victory with 176 out of 250 seats. (From 2000 to 2011, assembly mandates were awarded to sponsoring parties or coalitions rather than to individual candidates, and it was common practice for the mandates to be assigned out of numerical order. Đurišić was not automatically elected by virtue of his list position, though he received a mandate all the same.) He took his seat when the assembly convened in January 2001 and shortly thereafter accompanied DS deputy chair Boris Tadić on an official visit to Germany. During his first term, he served on the committee for international relations, the committee for transport and communications, and the finance committee.

The DS contested the 2003 Serbian election at the head of its own alliance and won thirty-seven mandates. Đurišić received the 147th position on the party's list. He was not included in the DS's initial delegation but received a mandate on 17 February 2004 as the replacement for another delegate who had resigned. The DS served in opposition in this sitting of parliament. In August 2005, Đurišić attended an event in Poland commemorating the twenty-fifth anniversary of the founding of Solidarity.

Đurišić received the sixty-seventh position on the Democratic Party's list in the 2007 parliamentary election. The list won sixty-four seats; he was again not immediately included in his party's delegation but received a mandate on 22 May 2007 as the replacement for another member. The DS formed an unstable alliance with the rival Democratic Party of Serbia (DSS) and G17 Plus after the election, and Đurišić again served as a government supporter. In his third term, he was the deputy leader of the DS's assembly group, a member of the defence and security committee, and the leader of Serbia's delegation to the NATO Parliamentary Assembly (where Serbia has observer status).

Đurišić was the chief of DS incumbent Boris Tadić's campaign staff in the 2008 Serbian presidential election, which was held over two rounds in January and February. Tadić won the election and afterward commended Đurišić for his work on the campaign. Soon after the vote, Đurišić was described as having "bawled out" a journalist who asked a challenging question about the DS's coalition partners, and the newspaper Politika ran an editorial criticizing him. Tadić accused Politika of having illegally recorded a conversation with Đurišić; Politika rejected the charge and defended its actions on the basis of a commitment to the freedom of the press. These events led to some friction between the newspaper and the Tadić presidency.

The DS–DSS alliance broke down in early 2008, and a new parliamentary election was held in May of that year. The DS contested the election at the head of the For a European Serbia (ZES) alliance. Đurišić received the fifty-ninth position on the alliance's list, which won a plurality victory with 102 out of 250 seats, and was afterward given a mandate for a fourth term. The overall result of the election was inconclusive, but ZES ultimately formed a new coalition government with the Socialist Party of Serbia (SPS), and Đurišić again served as a government supporter. After the consolidation of the ZES–SPS alliance at the republic level, Đurišić announced that the alliance would also cooperate in municipal governments across the province of Vojvodina. In August 2009, he expressed the view that Serbian politics was likely shifting in the direction of a two-party system, with the Democratic Party and the Serbian Progressive Party (SNS) at the head of rival blocs. He continued to serve on the defence and security committee and to lead Serbia's delegation to the NATO parliamentary assembly and was a deputy member of the foreign affairs committee and the committee for European integration.

Serbia's electoral system was reformed in 2011, such that all parliamentary mandates were awarded to candidates on successful lists in numerical order. Đurišić received the eighty-fifth position on the Democratic Party's Choice for a Better Life coalition list in the 2012 Serbian parliamentary election and was not re-elected when the list won sixty-seven seats. He also appeared in the twenty-fourth position on the party's list for the New Belgrade municipal assembly in the concurrent 2012 Serbian local elections and was re-elected to that body when the DS won thirty-one mandates and formed a new government under the local leadership of Aleksandar Šapić.

The SNS and SPS formed a new coalition government at the republic level after the 2012 election, and the DS moved into opposition. After its fall from power, the DS increasingly became divided into rival wings led by Boris Tadic and Dragan Đilas. Đurišić sided with Tadić. In December 2012, he voted against an internal party decision for former ministers to return their parliamentary mandates (i.e., resign from the legislature).

=== Social Democratic Party ===
The Democratic Party split in early 2014, with Tadić forming a breakaway group initially called the New Democratic Party (NDS). The party contested the 2014 parliamentary election in a fusion with the Greens of Serbia (ZS) and in alliance with other parties. Đurišić joined the NDS, received the eighth position on the alliance's list, and was re-elected to the assembly when the list won eighteen mandates. The SNS and its allies won a majority victory in the election and continued to govern in an alliance with the SPS; the NDS served in opposition, and Đurišić became the leader of its assembly group. Later in the year, the party changed its name to the Social Democratic Party. In this assembly term, Đurišić was a member of the administrative committee (Note: Formally known as the Committee on Administrative, Budgetary, Mandate, and Immunity Issues.) and the defence and internal affairs committee, a deputy member of the committee for culture and information, a deputy member of Serbia's delegation to the NATO parliamentary assembly, the leader of Serbia's parliamentary friendship group with Jordan, and a member of the friendship groups with Australia, Brazil, Montenegro, and the United States of America.

The SDS contested the 2016 Serbian parliamentary election in a coalition with the Liberal Democratic Party (LDP) and the League of Social Democrats of Vojvodina (LSV). Đurišić received the fourth position on the coalition's list and was re-elected when it won thirteen mandates. The SNS again won a majority victory, the SDS continued to serve in opposition, and Đurišić again served as the leader of the SDS's assembly group. He also became vice-chair of the defence and internal affairs committee and was a member of the administrative committee and the committee for the rights of the child, the leader of Serbia's friendship group with Jordan, and a member of the friendship groups with Argentina, Australia, Belarus, Bosnia and Herzegovina, Brazil, Canada, China, Germany, Iran, Israel, Japan, Montenegro, Morocco, and the United States of America.

Đurišić appeared in the eighty-seventh position on the NDS coalition's list in the 2014 Belgrade city assembly election and the second position on a combined DS–SDS list in the 2018 city assembly election. In each case, the list failed to cross the electoral threshold for representation in the city assembly.

=== Serbia 21 ===
Serbia's centre-left opposition parties began boycotting the national assembly in 2019, charging that the country's SNS-led administration was undermining the country's democratic institutions. The SDS took part in the boycott and ultimately did not participate in the 2020 Serbian parliamentary election.

In 2019, Đurišić and fellow SDS parliamentarian Nenad Konstantinović joined a new political movement called Serbia 21. Boris Tadić denounced their decision, and both delegates subsequently left the SDS. In March 2020, Serbia 21 announced that it would participate in the upcoming parliamentary election with United Democratic Serbia (UDS), a coalition of mostly centre-left and pro-European Union parties that opposed the boycott. Đurišić appeared in the lead position on the UDS list. During the campaign, he said that the UDS would "return Serbia to the path of building a modern, European, democratic state." Tadić charged that Serbia 21 was legitimizing the SNS administration by participating in the election and described the party as a "project" of SNS leader and Serbian president Aleksandar Vučić. Ultimately, the UDS list did not cross the electoral threshold. Serbia 21 became inactive following the election, and Đurišić has not returned to political life since this time.

== Electoral record ==
=== Local (City of Belgrade) ===
2000 Belgrade city election: New Belgrade Division 3
Candidate	Party
Prof. Dr. Radivoje Grbić	Socialist Party of Serbia–Yugoslav Left
Marko Ðurišić (***WINNER***)	Democratic Opposition of Serbia (Affiliation: Democratic Party)
Peđa Radoičić	Serbian Renewal Movement
Boško Hadžić	Citizens' Group
Uglješa Šatara	Serbian Radical Party
Total
