= United Democratic Serbia =

United Democratic Serbia Уједињена демократска Србија Ujedinjena demokratska Srbija
- Leader: Marko Đurišić
- Founded: February 2020
- Dissolved: Prior July 2020
- Ideology: Social liberalism; Social democracy; Pro-Europeanism
- Political position: Center-left

Website
- www.evropskasrbija.rs (archived)

United Democratic Serbia (Serbian: Уједињена демократска Србија / Ujedinjena demokratska Srbija) was a liberal and Pro-European political coalition in Serbia that participated in the 2020 parliamentary election. The coalition was headed by Marko Đurišić, the President of Serbia 21.

== History ==
Political parties that were a part of this coalition were: Serbia 21, Party of Modern Serbia, Civic Democratic Forum, League of Social Democrats of Vojvodina, Vojvodina's Party, Montenegrin Party, Democratic Alliance of Croats in Vojvodina, Together for Vojvodina and the Union of Romanians of Serbia.

This coalition was formed with a goal to accelerate the integration of Serbia into EU, euroatlantic integrations, to form good relations with the Western powers and resolve the Kosovo question.

== Members ==
Name	Ideology	Political position
Serbia 21; Србија 21; Srbija 21	Social liberalism Social democracy Pro-Europeanism	Centre to centre-left
Party of Modern Serbia; Странка модерне Србије; Stranka moderne Srbije	Liberalism; Decentralization; Pro-Europeanism	Centre
League of Social Democrats of Vojvodina; Лига социјалдемократа Војводина; Liga socijaldemokrata Vojvodine	Social democracy Autonomism; Pro-Europeanism	Centre-left
Civic Democratic Forum; Грађански демократски форум Građanski demokratski forum	Liberalism; Atlanticism; Pro-Europeanism	Radical centre
Vojvodina's Party; Војвођанска партија Vojvođanska partija	Autonomism; Atlanticism; Pro-Europeanism	Centre-left
Montenegrin Party; Црногорска партија Crnogorska partija	Montenegrin nationalism Atlanticism; Pro-Europeanism	Centre-left
Democratic Alliance of Croats in Vojvodina; Демократски савез Хрвата у Војводини; Demokratski savez Hrvata u Vojvodini	Croat minority interests Autonomism; Pro-Europeanism	Centre-right

== Election result ==
National Assembly of Serbia
Year	Popular vote	% of popular vote	# of seats	Seat change	Government
2020	30,591	0.95%	0 / 250	▼11	no seats
