= Vojvodina's Party =

Political party in Serbia

Vojvodina's Party Војвођанска партија Vojvođanska partija
- Abbreviation: VP
- President: Aleksandar Odžić
- Vice Presidents: Sanja Telarov; Petar Ilić; Željko Janković
- Founder: Igor Kurjački
- Founded: 25 April 2005
- Headquarters: Vojvođanskih Brigada 17, Novi Sad
- Youth wing: Vojvodina Youth
- Women's wing: Women's Forum
- Ideology: Vojvodina autonomism Atlanticism; Pro-Europeanism
- Political position: Left-wing
- National affiliation: Vojvodina Front (2019–2024); Vojvodinians (2024–present)
- Colours: Blue
- Assembly of Vojvodina: 0 / 120
- National Assembly: 0 / 250

Party flag

Website
- vojvodjanskapartija.org.rs

The Vojvodina's Party (Serbian: Војвођанска партија, romanized: Vojvođanska partija, IPA: [vǒjvodʑanskaː pǎrtija]; VP) was a political party in Serbia that operated in Vojvodina, an autonomous province within the country.

== Party platform ==
The party advocated for the federalization of Serbia, and Vojvodina as a republic within a common state with Serbia. The president of the Vojvodina Party was a former member of the Assembly of the Autonomous Province of Vojvodina Aleksandar Odžić.

== History ==
The party was formed in 2005 by unifying several democratic autonomist political organizations and movements in Vojvodina.

In late 2023, Vojvodina's Party permitted the Civic Democratic Party (GDP) to take over its official party registration. It is not clear if the VP still exists as a separate organization. The Vojvodina Party is not registered in the Register of Political Parties by the Ministry of State Administration and Local Self-Government.

=== Party Leaders ===
- Aleksandar Odžić (2009–2023)
- Igor Kurjački (2005–2009)
