= 2020 Serbian parliamentary election =

Parliamentary election in Serbia

- 21 June 2020
- All 250 seats in the National Assembly; 126 seats needed for a majority
- Turnout: 48.88% (▼7.19pp)
Party	Leader	Vote %	Seats	+/–
SNS coalition	Aleksandar Vučić	63.02	188	+57
SPS–JS–ZS–KP	Ivica Dačić	10.78	32	+3
SPAS	Aleksandar Šapić	3.98	11	New
Minority lists
VMSZ	István Pásztor	2.32	9	+5
SPP–DPM	Muamer Zukorlić	1.04	4	+2
ADS	Shaip Kamberi	0.85	3	+2
SDAS	Sulejman Ugljanin	0.80	3	+1
This lists parties that won seats. See the complete results below.
Election results by municipality
Prime Minister before	Prime Minister after
Ana Brnabić; SNS	Ana Brnabić; SNS

Parliamentary elections were held in Serbia on 21 June 2020. Initially organized for 26 April 2020, they were postponed by a state of emergency due to the COVID-19 pandemic in the country.

In the period before the elections, inter-party European Parliament–mediated dialogue was held and certain changes in election legislation were made. Numerous parliamentary and non-parliamentary political parties boycotted the elections, including the major opposition coalition Alliance for Serbia, which said that there were no conditions for free and fair elections. This resulted in the lowest turnout since the establishment of a multi-party system in 1990.

The Serbian Progressive Party–led coalition won one of the largest parliamentary majorities in Europe. Election observer organizations declared that the elections were conducted efficiently according to minimum democratic standards, but noted some irregularities that affected turnout and results. The OSCE reported that many previous recommendations of the ODIHR were not adopted, at the same time criticizing the lack of freedom in the media.

== Background ==
Since Aleksandar Vučić came to power in 2012, Serbia has suffered from democratic backsliding into authoritarianism, followed by a decline in media freedom and civil liberties. In the 2016 parliamentary election, the ruling Serbian Progressive Party-led coalition and the Socialist Party of Serbia-led coalition returned to power, and the incumbent prime minister Vučić was successfully re-elected. However, in the 2017 presidential election, Vučić was elected president, and left the government for his new position. The election result sparked protests around Serbia. Thousands of demonstrators accused Vučić of leading the country towards authoritarianism. An OSCE report criticized unbalanced media coverage during the election campaign, use of public resources to support Vučić and reports of pressure on employees of state-affiliated institutions to support Vučić and secure, in a cascade fashion, support from family members and friends. Ana Brnabić was appointed head of government as a non-partisan politician, becoming Serbia's first female and first openly gay prime minister. Two years later, she joined the ruling Serbian Progressive Party.

In January 2019, Vučić stated that there was a possibility of holding early elections in 2019. Observers noted that this was highly possible, as it would enable the SNS to make electoral gains before having to compromise on unpopular decisions regarding the status of Kosovo, which was expected to hit the party's rating. In May 2019, the European Commission criticized election conditions and expressed a serious concern about press freedom in the Serbia 2019 Report. They also stated that there was a negative impact on the work of democratic institutions, in particular the National Assembly, and that there was an urgent need to create space for genuine cross-party debate and conditions for meaningful participation by the opposition in the parliament.

=== Anti-government protests ===
Meanwhile, Vučić was also put under pressure by mass protests in Belgrade and other cities, with the opposition demanding more media freedom, as well as free and fair elections and ministerial resignations. The protests were precipitated by an assault on Borko Stefanović, one of the leaders of the newly formed opposition coalition Alliance for Serbia. These were the largest anti-government protests since Vučić came to power in 2012, with media reports estimating the attendance at protests to be between 25,000 and 70,000 people. Parallel to the protests, Vučić launched the "Future of Serbia" campaign, organizing rallies in all districts of Serbia.

After the largest opposition protest on 13 April, a non-partisan expert group was introduced that later formulated the demands of the protests, concluded there were no conditions for free and fair elections, and eventually drafted a comprehensive document with demands and recommendations. In early September, the protest organizers called for a boycott of the coming election because no recommendation of the expert team had been adopted.

=== Inter-party negotiations ===
After the unsuccessful conclusion of the negotiations mediated by the University of Belgrade Faculty of Political Sciences and NGOs, the first round of inter-party European Parliament-mediated dialogue in Serbia took place in October, which was initiated by David McAllister, the chairman of the Foreign Affairs Committee of the EP. The Alliance for Serbia refused to participate, stating that there was no time for their demands for fair election conditions to be met before the election in April. In December 2019, following three rounds of dialogue, the EP delegation members announced that conditions for fair and free elections had not been established. After the last round, it was concluded that continued observation of implementation was necessary and it was agreed to move the election as late as possible.

The CeSID stated that changes in electoral legislation on three occasions during the election year were contrary to the Venice Commission's Code of Good Practice in Elections. The decision of the ruling party to lower the electoral threshold from 5% to 3% has been criticized by numerous observers, opposition parties, EP delegation members and Transparency Serbia, stating that it was not a topic of negotiation and that it will help some smaller parties enter parliament after the announced boycott of the largest opposition parties.

== Participating parties ==
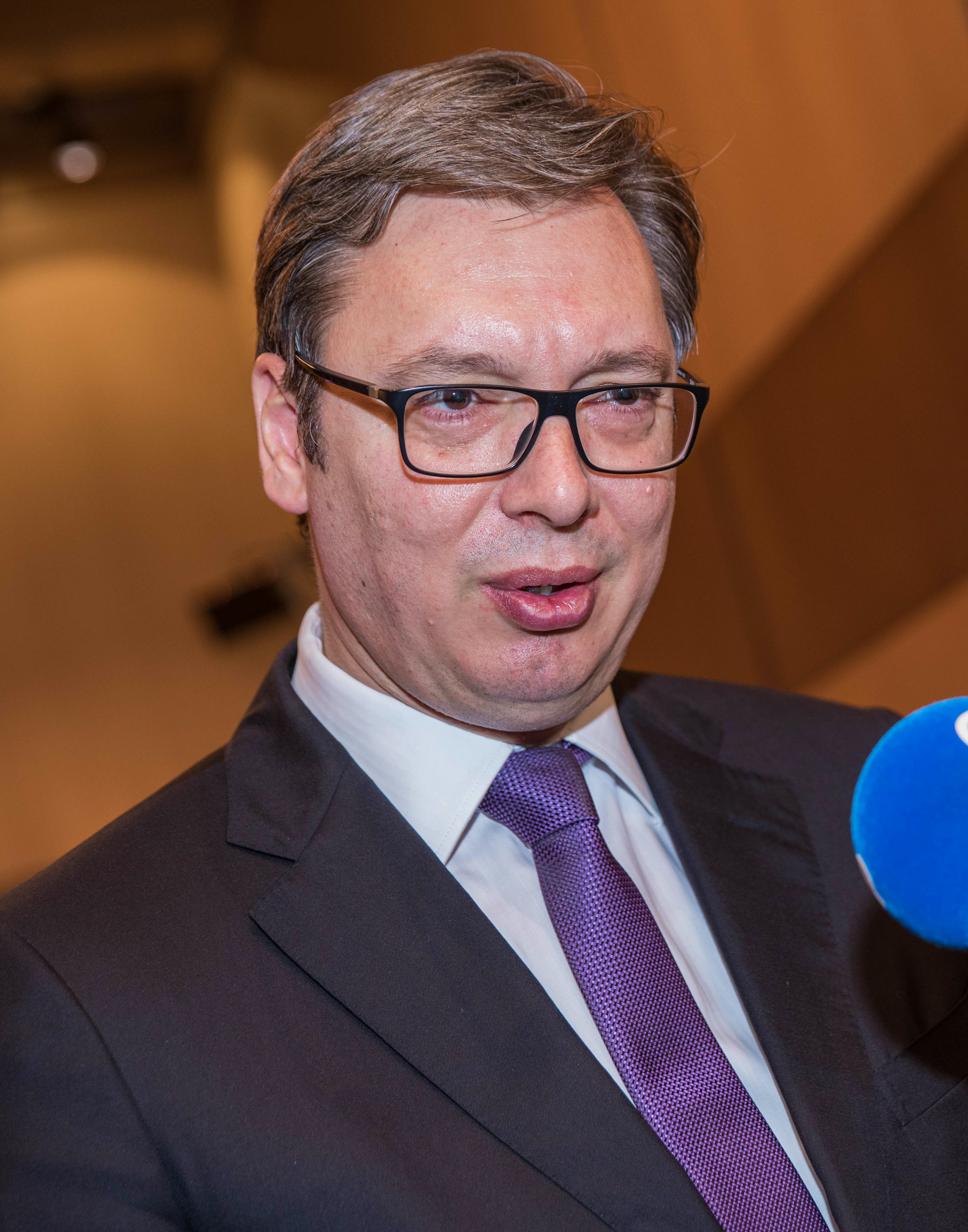
President Aleksandar Vučić, whose SNS came to power in 2012, when the country began to suffer a democratic backsliding into authoritarianism

After the 2017 presidential elections, Saša Janković, who finished second with 16.3% of the vote, formed the liberal Movement of Free Citizens (PSG) in May 2017. In October 2017, Vuk Jeremić, who finished fourth with 5.6% of the vote, formed his own liberal-conservative People's Party (NS), which cooperated closely with Janković's party.

In June 2018, opposition parties held talks on forming an alliance, which became possible with the election of leadership in the Democratic Party, which was in favor of allying with Dragan Đilas, who was very successful in the Belgrade local election, and the PSG and NS. This alliance of mostly pro-Western and pro-EU parties also included other opposition organizations, regardless of their stance on EU, including the right-wing Dveri, an anti-EU party. The opposition alliance was dubbed by the media and main participants in its formation as Alliance for Serbia (Serbian Cyrillic: Савез за Србију, SZS).

=== Boycott ===
Almost all opposition parties (except the Democratic Party of Serbia, Serbian Patriotic Alliance and Don't let Belgrade d(r)own) signed the Agreement with People in February 2019, where they promised to boycott the 2020 elections if they were deemed irregular. In addition, in September 2019, the protest organizers called for a boycott of the next election.

The elections were boycotted by several political parties, including the major opposition coalition the Alliance for Serbia (composed of the Democratic Party, Dveri, People's Party, Party of Freedom and Justice, Movement for Reversal, Fatherland and the United Trade Unions "Sloga"), the Civic Platform, as well some extra-parliamentary parties and movements, such as Social Democratic Union and the Do not let Belgrade d(r)own-led Civic Front alliance, which stated that the elections would not be held under fair conditions. Together for Serbia and the Social Democratic Party, also boycotted the parliamentary election, only participating in some elections at the local (municipal) level. Some individual politicians also declared a boycott, such as Đorđe Vukadinović, member of the National Assembly, and Ljubiša Preletačević, who finished third in the 2017 presidential election.

== Electoral system ==
The 250 members of the National Assembly are elected by closed-list proportional representation from a single nationwide constituency. Seats are allocated using the d'Hondt method with an electoral threshold of 3% of all votes cast (lowered from 5% at the previous elections) although the threshold is waived for ethnic minority parties.

While some parties choose to contest elections solely in their own name, multi-party coalitions are more common. This allows smaller parties to reach the electoral threshold together, while for larger parties it represents an opportunity to amass support from more diverse sections of the electorate.

== Electoral lists ==
The following are the official electoral lists published by the Republic Electoral Commission (RIK).

#	Ballot name	Ballot carrier	Main ideology	Political position	Note
1	Aleksandar Vučić — For Our Children; SNS, SDPS, PS, PUPS, PSS–BK, SNP, SPO, NSS, USS	Branislav Nedimović	Populism	Big tent	
2	Ivica Dačić — "Socialist Party of Serbia (SPS), United Serbia (JS) — Dragan Marković Palma"; SPS, JS, KP, ZS	Ivica Dačić	Populism	Big tent	
3	Dr Vojislav Šešelj — Serbian Radical Party; SRS	Vojislav Šešelj	Ultranationalism	Far-right	
4	Alliance of Vojvodina Hungarians — István Pásztor; SVM	Bálint Pásztor	Minority interests	Centre-right	^{M}
5	Aleksandar Šapić — Victory for Serbia; SPAS	Aleksandar Šapić	National conservatism	Right-wing	
6	For the Kingdom of Serbia (Movement for the Restoration of the Kingdom of Serbia, Monarchist Front) — Žika Gojković; POKS, MF, SMP	Ljubinko Đurković	Monarchism	Right-wing	
7	United Democratic Serbia; S21, SMS, GDF, LSV, VP, CP, DSHV, ZZV, URS	Marko Đurišić	Social democracy	Centre-left	
8	Academic Muamer Zukorlić — Straight Ahead — Justice and Reconciliation Party — Democratic Party of Macedonians; SPP, DPM	Muamer Zukorlić	Minority interests		^{M}
9	BROOM 2020; DSS, TZŽ, NJS, USK	Miloš Jovanović	National conservatism	Right-wing	
10	Milan Stamatović — May The Health Win — Dragan Jovanović — Better Serbia — Healthy Serbia; ZS, BS, ZZŠ	Milan Stamatović	National conservatism	Right-wing	
11	SDA of Sandžak — Dr Sulejman Ugljanin; SDAS	Enis Imamović	Minority interests	Right-wing	^{M}
12	Milica Đurđević Stamenkovski — Serbian Party Oathkeepers; SSZ	Zoran Zečević	Ultranationalism	Far-right	
13	People's Bloc — Velimir Ilić — General Momir Stojanović; NS, NSP	Velimir Ilić	Right-wing populism	Right-wing	
14	Sergej Trifunović — Movement of Free Citizens; PSG	Sergej Trifunović	Liberalism	Centre	
15	The Sovereignists; DJB	Saša Radulović	Right-wing populism	Right-wing	
16	Albanian Democratic Alternative — United Valley; PDD, APN, PD, LR, LPD	Shaip Kamberi	Minority interests	Centre-right	^{M}
17	Group of Citizens: 1 of 5 million; 1 of 5 million	Valentina Reković	Liberalism	Centre-left	
18	May the Masks Fall — Green Party — New Party; ZS, NS	Zoran Živković	Social liberalism	Centre to centre-left	
19	Russian Party — Slobodan Nikolić; RS	Slobodan Nikolić	National conservatism	Right-wing	
20	Čedomir Jovanović — Coalition for Peace; LDP, VNS, TS, BGS, LDPV, UJS, AMARO, SC, RH, Skaska	Čedomir Jovanović	Liberalism	Centre	
21	Leviathan Movement — I live for Serbia; Leviathan, ŽZS	Jovana Stojković	Neo-fascism	Far-right	

^{M} — National minority list

== Opinion polls ==
The highest percentage figure in each polling survey is displayed in bold, and the background shaded in the leading party's color. In the instance that there is a tie, then no figure is shaded. The lead column on the right shows the percentage-point difference between the two parties with the highest figures. When a specific poll does not show a data figure for a party, the party's cell corresponding to that poll is shown with a hyphen (-). If a poll was conducted prior to the establishment of a party, a hyphen is given instead of the result. Poll results use the date the fieldwork was done, as opposed to the date of publication. However, if such a date is unknown, the date of publication will be given instead.

The results of the SNS in different polls represent results of the party itself, although it usually runs in a broad coalition, which includes, besides SNS as the largest party, Social Democratic Party of Serbia, Party of United Pensioners of Serbia, New Serbia, Serbian Renewal Movement, Movement of Socialists, Strength of Serbia Movement, Independent Democratic Party of Serbia and Serbian People's Party. SPS formed a longstanding coalition with United Serbia, included in SPS poll results. All polls are conducted excluding Kosovo.

View source data.

=== Polls conducted after official start of campaign ===
Polling organization	Date	SNS coalition	SPS–JS	SRS	DJB	DSS coalition	SPAS	PSG	#1of5m	UDS	POKS	SSZ	Others	Lead
**Results**		60.65	**10.38**	**2.05**	**2.30**	**2.24**	**3.83**	**1.58**	**0.63**	**0.95**	**2.67**	**1.43**	**11.74**	**50.27**
Ipsos	19 June	58.6	9.8	2.5	2.5	1.8	4.4	3.1	2.2	1.6	2.4	1.6	9.5	48.8
Faktor plus	18 June	60.6	13.0	3.6	2.9	3.1	5.1	3.5	–	2.8	2.5	2.7	0.2	45.5
NSPM	18 June	58.0	12.5	2.6	2.9	3.5	4.4	3.5	0.9	1.4	1.8	1.8	6.7	45.5
Faktor plus	12 June	58.2	12.5	3.4	2.8	3.0	4.9	3.4	–	2.7	2.4	2.6	–	45.7
Faktor plus	7 June	61.0	13.5	3.3	2.6	3.1	4.9	3.6	1.3	2.4	2.1	2.2	–	45.2
NSPM	4 June	41.6	10.7	2.6	2.1	2.1	4.3	3.8	1.0	1.0	1.0	2.1	25.8 (Note: Including 10,2% for opposition Alliance for Serbia (SZS), which boycott the election and 12,4% for the opposition, but still undecided as to whom.)	30.9
NSPM	24 April	41.6	10	3.1	1.5	–	3.4	3.4	2.5	2	–	–	32.4 (Note: Including 11,2% for opposition Alliance for Serbia (SZS), which boycott the election and 14,9% for the opposition, but still undecided as to whom.)	45.7
Election postponed due to coronavirus pandemic
Faktor plus	09 Mar	59.8	15.1	3.5	–	3	4.8	2.5	2.8	3	2.1	2.3	1.1	44.7

=== Polls conducted before official start of campaign ===
- Italic text denotes parties and coalitions which declared boycott of the election.

Polling organization	Date	Sample size	SNS	SPS	SRS	DJB	DS	Dveri	DSS	PSG	NS	SZS	SPAS	Others	Lead
Faktor plus	04 Feb	-	53.6	9.5	3.3	-	(with SZS)	(with SZS)	2.4	6	(with SZS)	10.3^{[b]}	4.3	10.6	43.3
Faktor plus	04 Jan	1,200	53.1	9.9	3.2	-	(with SZS)	(with SZS)	2.4	6.6	(with SZS)	10^{[b]}	4.3	10.5	43.1
NDI	04 Jan	-	34	7	3	-	(with SZS)	(with SZS)	-	3	(with SZS)	6^{[b]}	2	45	27
2020
NSPM	24 Dec	1,000	43.1	11.3	2.5	-	(with SZS)	(with SZS)	1	3.8	(with SZS)	14^{[b]}	2.3	21.9	29.1
Faktor plus	9 Dec	-	52.9	9.8	3.2	-	(with SZS)	(with SZS)	2.4	6.5	(with SZS)	10.1^{[b]}	4.1	11	42.8
Ipsos	4 Nov	-	56	12.5	5	3.5	(with SZS)	(with SZS)	2.7	5	(with SZS)	8.5^{[b]}	3.6	3.1	43.5
NSPM	15-22 Sep	1,000	43.8	10.8	2	1.1	(with SZS)	(with SZS)	-	4.3	(with SZS)	14.2^{[b]}	2.4	19.4 (Note: Including 15.8% for the opposition, but still undecided as to whom.)	29.6
Faktor plus	15 Oct	-	52	9.8	3.8	-	(with SZS)	(with SZS)	2.4	5.7	(with SZS)	11.2^{[b]}	4	11.1	40.8
SZS declared election boycott
Faktor plus	11 Sep	-	52.4	10	4	-	(with SZS)	(with SZS)	2.2	5.5	(with SZS)	11.5	3.8	12.8	40.9
Faktor plus	29 Jul–1 Aug	1,000	52.3	9.5	4.8	2.3	(with SZS)	(with SZS)	2.9	5.3	(with SZS)	11.2	3.5	10.5	41.1
BIRODI	9 Jul	1,006	50.7	6.0	-	-	(with SZS)	(with SZS)	-	3.9	(with SZS)	15.2	4.1	20.1	35.5
NSPM	30 Jun–7 Jul	1,000	44.5	8.2	2.8	-	(with SZS)	(with SZS)	0.7	3.7	(with SZS)	11.3	2.7	26 (Note: Including 22.8% for the opposition, but still undecided as to whom.)	33.2
Faktor plus	28 Jun–4 Jul	1,200	53	9.9	5.3	-	(with SZS)	(with SZS)	3	5.2	(with SZS)	11.1	3.5	9	41.9
Faktor plus	30 May–5 Jun	1,200	51.3	9.7	5.8	-	(with SZS)	(with SZS)	(with SPAS)	5.1	(with SZS)	10.6	6.7	10.2	40.7
Faktor plus	30 Apr–8 May	-	55	9.8	3.2	-	(with SZS)	(with SZS)	(with SPAS)	5	(with SZS)	10.5	6.6	9.9	44.5
NSPM	19–27 Apr	1,000	44.4	9.1	2	-	(with SZS)	(with SZS)	1	4	(with SZS)	14.5	1.5	23.5 (Note: Including 19.2% for the opposition, but still undecided as to whom.)	29.9
Faktor plus	7–11 Apr	1,000	54.8	10.1	3.1	-	(with SZS)	(with SZS)	2.9	5.1	(with SZS)	11.8	3.2	9 (Note: Including 3.5% for the PUPS, and 2.3% for the SNP. Both parties went in coalition with the SNS in the 2016 election.)	43
Ipsos	4–5 Apr	1,100	53.9	12.2	4	3.0	(with SZS)	(with SZS)	2.3	6.2	(with SZS)	9.8	3.0	13.9	41.7
NSPM	16 Mar	1,000	43.4	8.7	2.7	-	(with SZS)	(with SZS)	1.7	4.4	(with SZS)	13.2	2.9	23.1 (Note: Including 17.9% for the opposition, but still undecided as to whom.)	30.2
Ipsos	13 Mar	-	55	12	4.5	-	(with SZS)	(with SZS)	-	8	(with SZS)	10	-	10.5	43
Faktor plus	8 Mar	1,200	55.1	10	3.8	-	(with SZS)	(with SZS)	2.8	5	(with SZS)	12.2	3.1	8 (Note: Including 3.4% for the PUPS, and 2.3% for the SNP. Both parties went in coalition with the SNS in the 2016 election.)	42.9
Faktor plus	1 Feb	-	55	10	4.2	1.9	(with SZS)	(with SZS)	2.3	2.5	(with SZS)	13.6	2.9	7.6 (Note: Including 3.4% for the PUPS which went in coalition with the SNS in the 2016 election.)	41.4
Ipsos	20 Jan	1,000	55	12	4	2	(with SZS)	(with SZS)	1.5	3	(with SZS)	14	3	5.5	41
2019
Faktor plus	17–26 Dec	1,250	53.8	9.8	4.5	-	(with SZS)	(with SZS)	2.2	1.2	(with SZS)	14.4	2.8	11.3 (Note: Including 3.4% for the PUPS which went in coalition with the SNS in the 2016 election.)	39.4
Faktor plus	3–6 Dec	1,050	53.5	9	4	-	(with SZS)	(with SZS)	2.1	3.4	(with SZS)	13.9	2.9	11.2 (Note: Including 3.4% for the PUPS, and 2.1% for the SNP. Both parties went in coalition with the SNS in the 2016 election.)	39.7
Civil and opposition protests began
NSPM	15–23 Nov	1,000	48.4	11.8	2.6	0.5	(with SZS)	(with SZS)	-	1	(with SZS)	17.3	2.8	15.6	31.1
Faktor plus	9 Nov	1,200	53.6	9.5	4.7	-	(with SZS)	(with SZS)	2	3.5	(with SZS)	13.1	2.7	13.6 (Note: Including 1.4% for the PUPS, and 2% for the SNP. Both parties went in coalition with the SNS in the 2016 election.)	40.5
Faktor plus	5–11 Oct	1,200	54	9	3.8	-	(with SZS)	(with SZS)	1.9	3.8	(with SZS)	11.7	2.5	13.3 (Note: Including 3.4% for the PUPS, 2% for the SDPS and 2% for the SNP. All three parties went in coalition with the SNS in the 2016 election.)	42.3
CeSid	5–20 Sep	1,510	53.3	8.8	4.2	1.8	(with SZS)	(with SZS)	-	4.2	(with SZS)	15.3	4.9	7.5	38
Faktor plus	31 Aug–7 Sep	1,200	54.7	9.4	4.2	-	(with SZS)	(with SZS)	1.7	3.5	(with SZS)	9.7	1.8	15 (Note: Including 3.4% for the PUPS, 2.3% for the SDPS and 2% for the SNP. All three parties went in coalition with the SNS in the 2016 election.)	45
Faktor plus	3–8 Aug	1,100	54.8	9.4	4.3	-	(with SZS)	(with SZS)	1.8	3.6	(with SZS)	9.6	-	16.5 (Note: Including 3.4% for the PUPS, 2.4% for the SDPS and 2% for the SNP. All three parties went in coalition with the SNS in the 2016 election.)	45.2
SZS and SPAS formed
NSPM	12–19 Jul	1,000	50	9.3	3	-	2.2	2.3	-	1.6	2.9	6.3 (Note: Hypothetical rating of a party expected to be formed by Dragan Djilas, former Mayor of Belgrade)	-	22.4	40.7
Faktor plus	1–6 Jul	1,200	54.8	8.8	4.3	-	3.2	2.8	1.3	2.4	3.2	5.2	-	14 (Note: Including 3.4% for the PUPS, 2.5% for the SDPS and 1.8% for the SNP. All three parties went in coalition with the SNS in the 2016 election.)	46
Faktor plus	1–7 Jun	1,200	55.3	9.4	2.7	-	3.6	3	1.3	1.6	3.5	-	-	19.6 (Note: Including 3.3% for the PUPS, 2.5% for the SDPS and 1.7% for the SNP. All three parties went in coalition with the SNS in the 2016 election.)	45.9
Faktor plus	2–6 May	1,040	56.9	9.6	2.8	-	3.5	3	1.3	1.8	3.6	-	-	17.5 (Note: Including 3.3% for the PUPS, 2.5% for the SDPS and 1.5% for the SNP. All three parties went in coalition with the SNS in the 2016 election.)	47.3
Faktor plus	6 April	1,100	56.7	9.5	2.6	1	3.8	2.8	1.3	2	3.4	-	-	16.9 (Note: Including 3.3% for the PUPS, 2.8% for the SDPS, and 1.3% for the SNP. All three parties went in coalition with the SNS in the 2016 election.)	47.2
Faktor plus	8 March	-	54	9.8	2.9	1.7	3.5	2.8	1.2	3.9	3	-	-	17.2 (Note: Including 3.2% for the PUPS, 3% for the SDPS. Both parties went in coalition with the SNS in the 2016 election.)	44.2
Faktor plus	23–29 Jan	1,200	53.1	10	4.2	2.8	6.9	3	-	4.8	3.9	-	-	11.3 (Note: Including 3.2% for the PUPS and 2.9% for the SDPS. Both parties went in coalition with the SNS in the 2016 election.)	43.1
NSPM (Note: Poll was conducted in Belgrade, on the matter of voting preferences regarding state level government)	24 Dec–4 Jan	1,200	45.6	8.9	4.5	4.7	9	5	-	11.1	3.1	-	-	8.1	34.5
2018
Faktor plus	15–25 Dec	1,200	53	10	5.2	3.1	7	3	-	5.7	3.8	-	-	9.2	43
Faktor plus	28 Nov–5 Dec	1,200	53	9.5	4	2.8	6.9	3	-	5.6	3.8	-	-	11.4	43.5
NSPM	1–10 Nov	1,200	44.2	8.8	5.5	2.9	5.6	5.2	-	16.2	3.5	-	-	8.1	28
Faktor plus	9 Nov	-	52.9	9.1	4.2	2.6	6.7	3.2	-	7.2	3.3	-	-	10.8	43.8
NS formed
Ipsos	23 Oct	-	55	8	6	3	4	5	-	8	-	-	-	11	47
Faktor plus	4–8 Oct	1,250	52.8	9.2	4.1	2.3	6.9	3	-	7.8	-	-	-	13.9 (Note: Including 3.1% for the PUPS and 2.9% for the SDPS. Both parties went in coalition with the SNS in the 2016 election.)	43.6
NSPM	20–27 Aug	1,000	46.4	9.8	5.3	2.5	4.5	4.4	-	10.3	3.1 (Note: Hypothetical rating)	-	-	13.7 (Note: Including 1.7% for the SDPS which went in coalition with the SNS in the 2016 election.)	36.1
Faktor plus	5–10 Aug	1,200	52.1	9.7	4	2.9	7.9	2.8	-	7	-	-	-	13.6	42.4
Ninamedia	17–28 Jul	1,061	52.1	8	5.1	3.1	4.1	5	-	7.2	-	-	-	15.4	44.1
Ipsos	31 Jul	-	54	8	5	4	5	5	-	11	-	-	-	8	43
Faktor plus	30 Jun–6 Jul	1,200	52.2	9.8	4	2.8	8	2.9	-	7.9	-	-	-	12.4	42.4
Faktor plus	26–31 May	1,100	52	9.1	5.1	3.7	7.4	2.7	-	8.5	-	-	-	11.5	42.9
NSPM	10–17 May	1,000	47.7	10.1	5.2	2.5	6.4	3.9	-	10.5	4.9	-	-	8.8	37.2
Ipsos	19–24 Apr	-	55	8	5	2	5	4	-	11	-	-	-	10	44
2017 presidential election (Vučić from SNS wins), PSG formed
Faktor plus	4–7 Mar	1,200	50.6	10.6	8	6.5	7.5	4	-	-	-	-	-	12.8	40
Faktor plus	24–31 Jan	1,200	51.2	10.5	8.7	7	6.8	3.8	-	-	-	-	-	12	40.7
2017
NSPM	23–30 Dec	1,350	51.1	10.8	7.9	7.1	4.9	4.3	1.2	-	-	-	-	12.7	40.3
Faktor plus	16–26 Dec	1,200	51.4	10	8.8	7	6.5	-	-	-	-	-	-	16.3	41.4
Faktor plus	9–16 Nov	1,100	51.5	10.4	8.8	7.1	5.5	3.3	-	-	-	-	-	13.4	41.1
Faktor plus	6–11 Oct	1,200	51.4	10.6	8.9	7	5	3.2	2.1	-	-	-	-	11.8	40.8
Faktor plus	1–8 Sep	1,200	51	10.1	8	6.3	4.8	3.1	2	-	-	-	-	14.7	40.9
Faktor plus	1–8 Aug	1,100	51.9	10.3	7.1	7	5	3	2.3	-	-	-	-	13.4	41.6
NSPM	11–22 Jul	1,100	47.5	10	7.1	6	6.7	4.1	2.8	-	-	-	-	15.8	37.5
Faktor plus	24–30 Jun	1,200	51.8	10.1	7.7	7.4	5	5.3	(with Dveri)	-	-	-	-	12.7	41.7
Faktor plus	30 May	1,200	50.1	10.8	8	7.5	5.5	5.6	(with Dveri)	-	-	-	-	12.5	39.3
**2016 election**	24 Apr 16	N/A	48.25	10.95	8.10	6.02	6.02	5.04	(with Dveri)	-	-	-	-	9.24	37.3

== Results ==
The ruling Aleksandar Vučić — For Our Children alliance, led by the Serbian Progressive Party, won a supermajority of seats amid an opposition boycott.

Party	Votes	%	Seats	+/–
For Our Children (SNS–SDPS–PS–PUPS–PSS–SNP–SPO–NSS)	1,953,998	63.02	188	+57
SPS–JS–ZS–KP	334,333	10.78	32	+3
Serbian Patriotic Alliance	123,393	3.98	11	New
For the Kingdom of Serbia	85,888	2.77	0	−1
Enough is Enough	73,953	2.39	0	−16
Broom 2020	72,085	2.32	0	−6
Alliance of Vojvodina Hungarians	71,893	2.32	9	+3
Serbian Radical Party	65,954	2.13	0	−22
Movement of Free Citizens	50,765	1.64	0	New
Serbian Party Oathkeepers	45,950	1.48	0	0
Health for the Victory (ZS–BS)	33,435	1.08	0	New
Straight Ahead (SPP–DPM)	32,170	1.04	4	+2
United Democratic Serbia (S21–SMS–GDF–LSV–VP–DSHV–CP)	30,591	0.99	0	−11
Albanian Democratic Alternative	26,437	0.85	3	+2
Party of Democratic Action of Sandžak	24,676	0.80	3	+1
Leviathan	22,691	0.73	0	New
1 of 5 million	20,265	0.65	0	New
Coalition for Peace	10,158	0.33	0	−4
People's Bloc (NS–NSP)	7,873	0.25	0	−5
May the Masks Fall (ZS–NS)	7,805	0.25	0	−2
Russian Party	6,295	0.20	0	0
Total	3,100,608	100.00	250	0
Valid votes	3,100,608	96.33		
Invalid/blank votes	118,155	3.67		
Total votes	3,218,763	100.00		
Registered voters/turnout	6,584,376	48.88		
Source: RIK

== Aftermath ==
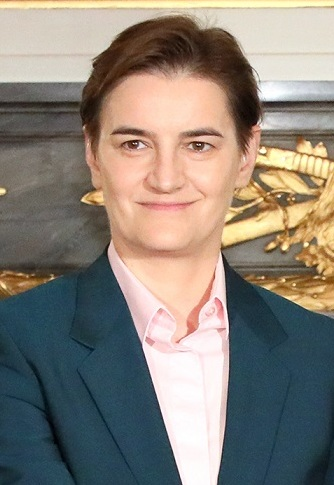
On 5 October 2020 incumbent PM Ana Brnabić was nominated as prime Minister-designate by the president of Serbia and of the ruling SNS Aleksandar Vučić, more than three months after his party won an absolute majority at the election.

The election observer organization CRTA described that the elections "have met a minimum of the democratic standards, but they imperil democracy". They recorded twice as many irregularities and incidents than in the previous elections, stating that the irregularities could have influenced the results and that turnout would have been about 45% without them. The CeSID reported that the elections respected basic human rights, but the political competition was limited due to the opposition boycott and the unclear distinction of party activities from the public officials' activities. The period of the state of emergency due to the COVID-19 pandemic, which was called the "campaign before the campaign", was strongly criticized. They noted irregularities, including serious ones such as parallel voter lists, the pressure to vote at all levels of elections, the presence of unauthorized persons at polling stations, conflicts at and in front of polling stations.

The OSCE announced in preliminary findings and conclusions that elections were conducted efficiently, despite the challenges of the pandemic, but that the concern was caused by the dominance of the ruling party, including in the media. They noted that many previous recommendations of the ODIHR had not been adopted, including on election administration, media, campaign financing, and sanctions for electoral violations. However, some recommendations were adopted, but "key amendments were passed in a swift manner and without prior consultations, limiting the inclusiveness of the process". Furthermore, the OSCE noted the lack of diversity of political opinions in traditional media and attacks or pressure on critical journalists and media outlets as well as possible meshing of the ruling party's campaign and media coverage of the response to the COVID-19 crisis.

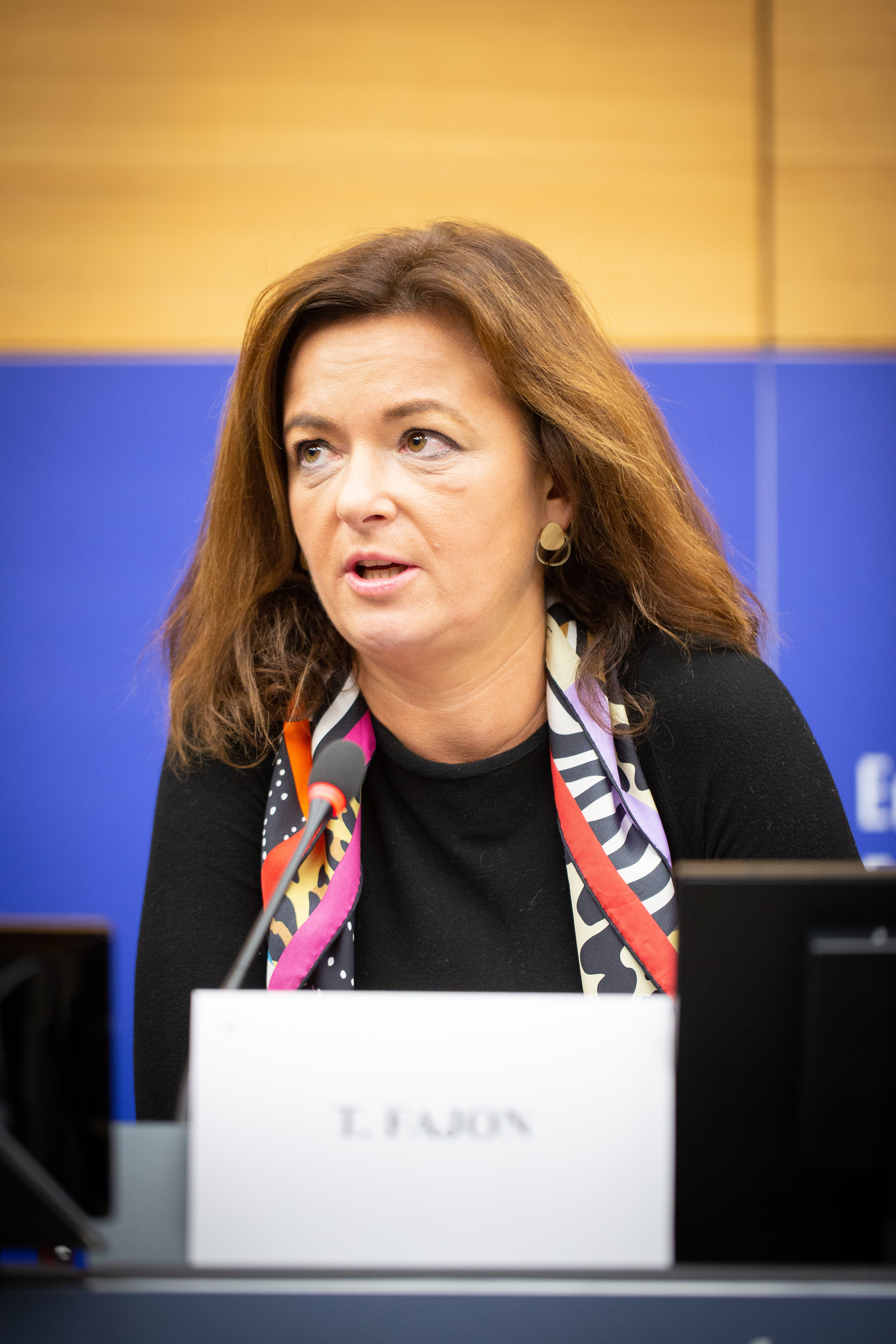
Tanja Fajon, the chair of the European Parliament Delegation for Relations with Serbia

Political scientist Florian Bieber stated that the Serbian Progressive Party overtook the United Russia party to become "the largest ruling party majority in Europe after Belarus" and that the European Union cannot pretend that a "farce of an election" did not happen in Serbia. The president of the European People's Party, Donald Tusk, as well as Sebastian Kurz, the chancellor of Austria, and Viktor Orbán, the prime minister of Hungary, congratulated Vučić on his victory. Kati Piri, the vice-chair of the Progressive Alliance of Socialists and Democrats (S&D) group, said that the election was not representative and that she is afraid "it won't change the erosion of the rule of law in the country", adding that "it should not be possible in a candidate country to the European Union". Tanja Fajon, the chair of the European Parliament Delegation for Relations with Serbia, stated that "the level of democracy has deteriorated significantly, let alone the situation of media freedom", citing that the absence of parliamentary opposition calls into question the legitimacy of parliament. In a joint statement, representatives of the S&D, Renew Europe and Greens–European Free Alliance, supported a request of the Serbian opposition to EU institutions to set up an expert group which would make a report "on the state and media capture", as the first step in resolving the political crisis.

The Assembly of Free Serbia, a project made by several professors, intellectuals and philosophers, has issued a press release saying that with the latest elections, "parliamentarism no longer exists in Serbia." The Assembly aims to form an opposition body which will elect its own members from the citizens and political parties with the aim of coordinating the opposition against Aleksandar Vučić.

In early May 2021, Vučić sent a proposal to Šapić about the merging of SPAS into SNS, which was accepted on the same day by Šapić. SPAS held inter-party talks during this period and its president Šapić announced that the party has been dissolved on 26 May.

=== Repeat elections ===
The Republic Electoral Commission announced that ballots from 234 voting locations would be terminated and elections would be repeated at those locations on July 1. Due to the worsening of the COVID-19 pandemic in Serbia, CRTA announced that it would not be observing the repeat elections.
