= 2020 Vojvodina provincial election =

Elections in Vojvodina, Serbia

← 2016	21 June 2020	2023 →
- All 120 seats in the Assembly of Vojvodina; 61 seats needed for a majority
- Turnout: 50.23% (▼5.43 pp)
Party	Leader	Vote %	Seats	+/–
SNS coalition	Igor Mirović	61.58	76	+13
SPS–JS	Dušan Bajatović	11.18	13	+1
VMSZ	István Pásztor	9.29	11	+5
VF	Nenad Čanak	5.12	6	−3
DSS	Branislav Ristivojević	4.38	5	+5
POKS	Goran Ivančević	4.21	5	New
SRS	Đurađ Jakšić	3.27	4	−6
This lists parties that won seats. See the complete results below.
President of the Government before	President of the Government after
Igor Mirović; SNS	Igor Mirović; SNS

Provincial elections were held in Vojvodina on 21 June 2020. Initially organised for 26 April 2020, they were postponed by a state of emergency due to the COVID-19 pandemic in Serbia.

== Electoral system ==
The 120 members of the Assembly are elected by closed-list proportional representation from a single provincial constituency. Seats are allocated using the d'Hondt method with an electoral threshold of 3% of all votes cast (lowered from 5% at the previous elections) although the threshold is waived for ethnic minority parties.

== Electoral lists ==
Ballot
No.	Party
1.	Aleksandar Vučić — For Our Children
2.	Ivica Dačić – "Socialist Party of Serbia (SPS), United Serbia (JS) – Dragan Marković Palma"
3.	Dr Vojislav Šešelj — Serbian Radical Party
4.	Vajdasági Magyar Szövetség — Pásztor István / Alliance of Vojvodina Hungarians — István Pásztor
5.	Vojvodina Front — (League of Social Democrats of Vojvodina, Together for Vojvodina, Vojvodina's Party, Democratic Alliance of Croats in Vojvodina, Montenegrin Party, Democratic Bloc)
6.	For Kingdom of Serbia — For Serbian Vojvodina
7.	BROOM 2020
8.	Čedomir Jovanović — Coalition for Peace
9.	Academician Muamer Zukorlić — Straight Ahead — Justice and Reconciliation Party (SPP) — Democratic Party of Macedonians (DPM)

== Results ==
Just like on the national level, many opposition parties boycotted the elections, leading to the ruling SNS-led For Our Children alliance winning over 60% of both votes and seats.

Party	Votes	%	Seats	+/–
For Our Children	498,495	61.58	76	+13
Socialist Party of Serbia–United Serbia	90,512	11.18	13	+1
Alliance of Vojvodina Hungarians	75,218	9.29	11	+5
Vojvodina Front (LSV–ZZV–VP–DSHV–CP–DB)	41,455	5.12	6	–3
Broom 2020	35,479	4.38	5	+5
For the Kingdom of Serbia	34,083	4.21	5	New
Serbian Radical Party	26,489	3.27	4	–6
Coalition for Peace	4,658	0.58	0	0
Straight Ahead (SSP–DPM)	3,070	0.38	0	New
Total	809,459	100.00	120	0
Valid votes	809,459	95.00		
Invalid/blank votes	42,562	5.00		
Total votes	852,021	100.00		
Registered voters/turnout	1,696,292	50.23		
Source: PIK
