= Dragan Milovanović (politician, born 1955) =

Serbian trade unionist and politician

- Драган Миловановић

Minister of Labour and Employment
- In office 18 January 2001 – 3 March 2004
- Prime Minister: Zoran Đinđić; Zoran Živković
- Preceded by: Gordana Matković
- Succeeded by: Slobodan Lalović

President of the Association of Free and Independent Trade Unions
- In office 2 July 1996 – 18 January 2001
- Preceded by: Position established
- Succeeded by: Ranka Savić

Personal details
- Born: 30 September 1955 (age 70) Belgrade, PR Serbia, Yugoslavia (now Serbia)
- Party: Labour Party of Serbia
- Other political affiliations: Coalition Together
- Occupation: Metalworker; trade unionist

Dragan Milovanović (Serbian Cyrillic: Драган Миловановић; born 30 September 1955) is a Serbian trade unionist and former politician. From 2001 to 2004, he was Serbia's minister of labour and employment. During his political career, Milovanović was the leader of the Association of Free and Independent Trade Unions (Asocijacija slobodnih i nezavisnih sindikata, ASNS) and the Labour Party of Serbia (Laburistička partija Srbije, LPS).

== Early life and career ==
Milovanović was born to a working class family in Belgrade, in what was then the Socialist Republic of Serbia in the Federal People's Republic of Yugoslavia. He was raised in the city, studied at a technical high school, and began working in a New Belgrade metalworks factory in 1975; he was still officially employed with the same factory when his political career began. He also became the leader of the company Rubiko in 1993.

== Union leader ==
Milovanović joined the Independent Trade Union of Workers in 1990 and became secretary of the Independent Union of Metalworkers of Serbia shortly thereafter. Serbian political life in this period was dominated by the authoritarian rule of Socialist Party of Serbia (Socijalistička partija Srbije, SPS) leader Slobodan Milošević, and Milovanović became an active opponent of the administration. In 1992, as a supporter of the opposition Democratic Movement of Serbia (Demokratski pokret Srbije, DEPOS) alliance, he led protests outside the building of the presidency of Serbia. The following year, he was active in seeking the release of Serbian Renewal Movement (Srpski pokret obnove, SPO) leaders Vuk and Danica Drašković from prison. He was named president of the Independent Union of the Steelworkers in 1994 and was re-elected in 1995.

The ASNS was founded on 2 July 1996, and Milovanović was appointed as its president. The union supported the opposition Zajedno (English: Together) coalition in the 1996 federal and local elections, held later in the year. During the campaign, Milovanović organized a public transport strike in Belgrade that was broken by the city authorities; mayor Nebojša Čović described the strike as illegal and intended to cause unrest in advance of the vote.

Zajedno was successful at the local level in Belgrade and other major cities, but its victories were not initially recognized by the state authorities; this prompted large-scale civic protests against Milošević's administration. Milovanović brought the ASNS into the protests in December 1996, an event considered significant in that it was the first time organized labour had taken part in a major anti-government action in Milošević's Serbia.

Milavanović later represented the ASNS in anti-government protests that followed the Kosovo War and the NATO bombing of Yugoslavia. He said in June 1999 that the labour situation in Serbia was perilous, with six hundred thousand unemployed and wages among the lowest in Europe. Responding to a suggestion that those made unemployed by the bombing would be asked to help with Serbia's reconstruction, he said, "This regime should know the workers will not work for them for peanuts any more, nor will they rebuild the country for free. [...] The Union won't allow any more unpaid work and will actively join the fight against the regime."

The ASNS was in this period a part of the Alliance for Change, a coalition of opposition parties. Milovanović was a featured speaker at many opposition rallies; at one such event, he said, "Down with Slobodan Milošević! Go while you still can before we force you to!" In September 1999, he called for a general strike against the administration.

In 2000, Milovanović brought the ASNS into the Democratic Opposition of Serbia (Demokratska opozicija Srbije, DOS), a broad and ideologically diverse coalition of parties opposed to the Milošević administration. He continued to participate in opposition protests throughout the year.

The ASNS was a frequent rival to the Confederation of Autonomous Trade Unions of Serbia (Savez Samostalnih Sindikata Srbije, SSSS), which was generally aligned with Milošević.

== Politician ==
=== 2000 elections and after ===
DOS candidate Vojislav Koštunica defeated Milošević in the 2000 Yugoslavian presidential election, a watershed moment in Serbian and Yugoslavian politics. As in 1996, the Milošević regime did not initially accept defeat, and a new wave of civic protests took place against the government; Milovanović participated in these events, helping to organize road blockades. The Milošević regime ultimately fell from power on 5 October 2000.

In addition to winning the presidential election, the DOS also defeated the SPS in the concurrent elections for the Yugoslavian parliament. Milovanović appeared in the second position on the DOS's electoral list in the Vranje division for the Chamber of Citizens (i.e., the lower house of the federal parliament) and was given a mandate after the list won two seats; his endorsement was from both the ASNS and the Democratic Party (Demokratska stranka, DS). He served in the assembly for the term that followed. In 2002, when far-right Serbian Radical Party (Srpska radikalna stranka, SRS) leader Vojislav Šešelj made an inflammatory speech accusing DS leader Zoran Đinđić of being under the control of the Serbian mafia, Milovanović responded that parliamentary authorities should investigate if Šešelj was under the influence of drugs or alcohol.

The Federal Republic of Yugoslavia was formally reconstituted as the State Union of Serbia and Montenegro in February 2003, and the Assembly of Serbia and Montenegro was established as its legislative branch. The first members of this body were chosen by indirect election from the republican parliaments of Serbia and Montenegro, with each parliamentary group allowed representation proportional to its numbers. Only sitting members of the Serbian assembly or the Montenegrin assembly, or members of the Federal Assembly of Yugoslavia at the time of the country's reconstitution, were eligible to serve. Milovanović was not given a seat in the new body, and his parliamentary term came to an end.

Milovanović was also elected to the City Assembly of Belgrade for New Belgrade's fourth division in the 2000 Serbian local elections, which were held concurrently with the Yugoslavian elections. The DOS won a landslide victory in the city, and he served as a supporter of the government. He was not a candidate in the 2004 local elections.

=== Minister of Labour and Employment (2001–2004) ===
The Serbian government fell after Milošević's defeat in the Yugoslavian election, and a new Serbian parliamentary election was called for December 2000. The DOS won a landslide majority victory, and DS leader Zoran Đinđić was chosen as Serbia's prime minister. On 18 January 2001, Milovanović was appointed as minister of labour and employment in the new government. To avoid a conflict of interest, he stood down from the ASNS presidency at this time.

Perhaps unsurprisingly, Milovanović faced frequent criticism and labour action from the rival SSSS during his time in office. In July 2001, SSSS leader Milenko Smiljanić argued that the government's new proposed labour legislation "threw workers' rights out the window"; one of his main criticisms was that the legislation would make it easier for employers for fire workers. He called for a general strike later in the year, demanding both the withdrawal of the legislation and Milovanović's resignation. Milovanović responded by noting the political nature of the strike, saying that some SPS managers were forcing their workers to participate. Notwithstanding this, the government changed to the legislation to protect workers from dismissal and improve conditions for collective bargaining. Milovanović also introduced a strategy in early 2002 to assist workers made redundant by privatization.

Under Milovanović's direction, the Serbian government increased the minimum wage from 2,600 to 3,250 Yugoslav dinars per month in January 2002. Further increases followed in June 2002 and July 2003.

On 19 October 2002, the ASNS main board founded the Labour Party of Serbia as its political wing and transferred its membership in the DOS to the new party. Milovanović was chosen as the LPS's leader.

Milovanović introduced a draft law on employment and unemployment insurance in January 2003, saying that its purpose was to target unemployment and reduce Serbia's "grey economy." Penalties were introduced for employers who did not pay unemployment insurance, and a national employment service was created for the benefit of employers and the unemployed. In April of the same year, he announced forthcoming legislation on health and occupational safety and the registration of trade unions and employers' organizations.

Serbia generally experienced economic instability in the early years after Milošević's fall from power, and much of the population faced precarious employment during Milovanović's time in office. In May 2003, he said that official unemployment had risen to 940,000 (though he later clarified that this figure exaggerated the extent of the problem, noting that two-thirds of officially unemployed people worked in the grey economy and that forty per cent of those claiming benefits were not actively seeking work).

The Labour Party of Serbia contested the 2003 Serbian parliamentary election on its own, and Milovanović led its electoral list. The list received few votes and did not cross the electoral threshold for assembly representation. His tenure as a cabinet minister ended when a new coalition government was formed in early 2004; one of his last acts in office was to announce a further increase in the minimum wage in February 2004. Milovanović later criticized Zoran Živković for not fielding a united DOS list in the election, as was initially planned.

=== Political activities since 2003 ===
Milovanović was re-elected as leader of the Labour Party of Serbia in December 2004, although the party largely became dormant after this time. In 2007, he said that the LPS was planning to field candidates in a limited number of municipalities in the following year's local elections. He later joined the Liberal Democratic Party (Liberalno demokratska partija, LDP).

The ASNS made a formal alliance with the LDP for the 2012 Serbian parliamentary election, and Milovanović appeared in the twenty-ninth position on the LDP-led Preokret (English: U-Turn) coalition list. The list won nineteen seats, and he was not elected. He was later given the twenty-third position on the LDP's list in the 2014 parliamentary election; on this occasion, the party did not cross the electoral threshold for assembly representation.

== Life after politics ==
Milovanović returned to a leadership role in the ASNS after leaving politics. In 2009, he accused the rival SSSS of threatening his union's members at a press conference in Niš. In 2016, he said that unions generally were facing suppression in Serbia, with union leaders often at risk of dismissal with little legal recourse.

In a 2020 interview, he described the revolution that overthrew Milošević as "a fine democratic revolution that provided Serbia with three or four years of democratic government and institutions, a perspective for a better life," although he added, "I don't feel that the October 5 side is victorious today because we have closed the circle - we have returned to a totalitarian regime, it seems to me that it is even worse than Milosevic's."

Milovanović is now the chief manager of the ASNS.

== Electoral record ==
=== Local (City of Belgrade) ===
2000 Belgrade city election: New Belgrade Division 4
Candidate	Party
Goran Veselinović	Serbian Radical Party
Dragan Milovanović (***WINNER***)	Democratic Opposition of Serbia–Dr. Vojislav Koštunica (Affiliation: Association of Free and Independent Trade Unions)
Srđan Srećković	Serbian Renewal Movement
Mr. Slobodan Čerović	Socialist Party of Serbia–Yugoslav Left–Slobodan Milošević (Affiliation: Yugoslav Left)
Total
