= Tihomir Đuričić =

Serbian politician

Tihomir Đuričić (Serbian Cyrillic: Тихомир Ђуричић; born 21 April 1959) is a politician in Serbia. He has served in the National Assembly of Serbia (2004–07) and the Assembly of Vojvodina (2004–08), and as mayor of Kula (2004–06). Đuričić is a member of the far-right Serbian Radical Party (Srpska radikalna stranka, SRS).

== Early life and private career ==
Đuričić was born in Odžaci, Autonomous Province of Vojvodina, in what was then the People's Republic of Serbia in the Federal People's Republic of Yugoslavia. He was raised in the village of Lipar in the neighbouring municipality of Kula. After service in the Yugoslav People's Army, he started working for "Bačka put" Novi Sad in 1979. Đuričić became a private entrepreneur in 1984 and was employed with Rodić MB from 1992 to 2000.

== Politician ==
Đuričić became the president of the SRS board in Kula in 1999. He appeared in the second position on the party's electoral list for the Sombor division in the 2000 Yugoslavian parliamentary election; the party did not win any seats in the division. He was also a candidate for the Kula–Bačka Topola division in the concurrent 2000 Vojvodina provincial election and was defeated.

Slobodan Milošević was defeated as Yugoslavia's president in the 2000 election, a watershed moment in Serbian and Yugoslavian politics. A new Serbian parliamentary election was called after his defeat for December 2000; prior to the vote, Serbia's electoral laws were changed such that the entire country was counted as a single electoral district and all parliamentary mandates were awarded to candidates at the discretion of the sponsoring parties and coalitions, irrespective of their numerical order on the electoral lists. Đuričić was given the eighty-second position on the Radical Party's list; the list won twenty-three seats, and he was not given a mandate.

=== Parliamentarian, provincial representative, and mayor ===
Đuričić received the 106th position on the Radical Party's list in the 2003 Serbian parliamentary election. The list won eighty-two seats, and he was not initially included in his party's assembly delegation. He was, however, given a mandate on 17 February 2004 as the replacement for another party member. Although the Radicals won more seats than any other party in the 2003 parliamentary election, they fell well short of a majority and ultimately served in opposition. In parliament, Đuričić served as a member of the committee on transport and communications.

Serbia introduced the direct election of mayors in the 2004 Serbian local elections, and Đuričić was elected as the mayor of Kula, defeating Slaviša Božović of the Democratic Party (Demokratska stranka, DS) in the second round. He was also elected to the Vojvodina assembly in the concurrent 2004 provincial election, winning the redistributed Kula constituency seat. The DS and its allies won the provincial election, and the Radicals served in opposition.

Kula's municipal government proved to be unstable after the 2004 election, and in May 2006 Đuričić was defeated in a recall election. He subsequently lost a by-election to choose a new mayor, falling to DS candidate Svetozar Bukvić in the second round. During the by-election campaign, Đuričić was convicted of stealing electricity at his family home and given a three-month jail sentence, suspended for one year.

Đuričić was included in the Radical Party's electoral lists for the 2007 and 2008 parliamentary elections, although he was not given a mandate on either occasion. He was also defeated in his bid for re-election in the Kula constituency seat in the 2008 Vojvodina provincial election, once again losing to Bukvić in the second round of voting.

The direct election of mayors proved to be a short-lived experiment; with the 2008 local elections, Serbia returned to a system of having mayors chosen by the elected members of city and municipal assemblies. The DS narrowly defeated the SRS in the 2008 local election in Kula; Đuričić was re-elected to the assembly and served in opposition.

The Radical Party experienced a serious split later in 2008, with several members joining the more moderate Serbian Progressive Party (Srpska napredna stranka, SNS) under the leadership of Tomislav Nikolić and Aleksandar Vučić. Đuričić remained with the Radicals.

Svetozar Bukvić resigned as Kula's mayor in late 2011, and the Serbian government appointed a provisional administration with representatives from different parties pending new elections. Đuričić served as the SRS's representative.

=== Since 2011 ===
Serbia's electoral laws were reformed in 2011, such that mandates were assigned in numerical order in all elections held under proportional representation. Đuričić was given the 161st position on the Radical Party's list for the 2012 Serbian parliamentary election; this was too low a position for election to be a realistic prospect, and in any event the party fell below the electoral threshold for representation in the assembly. He also ran for the Kula constituency seat again the 2012 provincial election and finished in sixth place against Jovan Janić of the DS. He was re-elected to the Kula municipal assembly in the 2012 local elections as the Radicals fell to only two seats out of thirty-seven.

Vojvodina switched to a system of full proportional representation for the 2016 provincial election. Đuričić received the twenty-eighth position on the Radical Party's list and was not elected when the list won ten mandates. He also led the SRS list in the concurrent 2016 local elections and was re-elected when the party again won two seats in the Kula municipal assembly. The SNS won a narrow majority victory in the Kula election; following the vote, Đuričić was appointed as an assistant to new mayor Perica Videkanjić on the economy, agriculture, and infrastructure. By virtue of holding his position, he was required to resign his assembly seat.

The local SNS organization in Kula became divided into factions after 2016, and Videkanjić resigned as mayor in May 2018. A new local election was held later that year, and Đuričić again led the SRS list. The party fell below the threshold for assembly representation.

Đuričić appeared in the nineteenth position on the SRS's list in the 2020 Vojvodina provincial election. The list won four mandates and he was again not elected.

== Electoral record ==
=== Provincial (Vojvodina) ===
2012 Vojvodina assembly election Kula (constituency seat) - First and Second Rounds
Candidate	Party or Coalition	Votes	%	Votes	%
Jovan Janić	Choice for a Better Vojvodina (Affiliation: Democratic Party)	4,688	21.38	10,017	56.28
Pero Ergarac	Let's Get Vojvodina Moving (Serbian Progressive Party, New Serbia, Movement of Socialists, Strength of Serbia Movement)	3,358	15.31	7,780	43.72
Aleksandar Zrakić	Socialist Party of Serbia–Party of United Pensioners of Serbia–United Serbia–Social Democratic Party of Serbia	3,024	13.79		
Radoslav Smiljanić	Democratic Party of Serbia	2,300	10.49		
Aleksandar Arvaji	United Regions of Serbia	2,049	9.34		
Tihomir Đuričić Tiho	Serbian Radical Party	1,653	7.54		
Olena Papuga	League of Social Democrats of Vojvodina–Nenad Čanak	1,619	7.38		
Vladimir Nikolić	Citizens' Group: Dveri	1,251	5.70		
Károly Valka	Alliance of Vojvodina Hungarians	1,178	5.37		
Mirjana Obradov	U-Turn	809	3.69		
Total valid votes		21,929	100	17,797	100

2008 Vojvodina assembly election Kula (constituency seat) - First and Second Rounds
Candidate	Party or Coalition	Votes	%	Votes	%
Svetozar Bukvić	For a European Vojvodina: Democratic Party–G17 Plus, Boris Tadić (Affiliation: Democratic Party)	9,774	42.44	8,033	64.02
Tihomir Đuričić Tiho (incumbent)	Serbian Radical Party	6,298	27.35	4,515	35.98
Dobrila Kalezić-Pindović	Socialist Party of Serbia (SPS)–Party of United Pensioners of Serbia (PUPS)	2,591	11.25		
Olena Papuga	"Together for Vojvodina–Nenad Čanak"	1,378	5.98		
Károly Valka	Hungarian Coalition–István Pásztor	1,138	4.94		
Tihomir Nićetin	Liberal Democratic Party	1,003	4.36		
József Solda	Democratic Party of Serbia–New Serbia–Vojislav Koštunica	848	3.68		
Total valid votes		23,030	100	12,548	100
Invalid ballots		958		244	
Total votes casts		23,988	62.75	12,792	33.46

2004 Vojvodina assembly election Kula (constituency seat) - First and Second Rounds
Candidate	Party or Coalition	Votes	%	Votes	%
Tihomir Đuričić Tiho	Serbian Radical Party–Tomislav Nikolić	2,931	24.41	5,799	57.92
Momir Tihomirović	Democratic Party–Boris Tadić	1,560	12.99	4,213	42.08
Željko Tatalović	Democratic Party of Serbia–Dr. Vojislav Koštunica	1,422	11.84		
Željko Dvožak	Coalition: For Vojvodina	1,316	10.96		
Smiljana Vukelić	Socialist Party of Serbia	1,178	9.81		
Jovan Bozdokov	Serbian Renewal Movement–Otpor Kula	911	7.59		
Melanija Dudaš	G17 Plus	847	7.05		
Milorad Mišović	Citizens' Group: All for Sivac	773	6.44		
Slobodanka Ćovin	Vojvodina Green Party–Radonjić Hercen Keka	594	4.95		
István Nagy	New Serbia	474	3.95		
Total valid votes		12,006	100	10,012	100
Invalid ballots		657		434	
Total votes casts		12,663	33.89	10,446	27.95

2000 Vojvodina assembly election Kula–Bačka Topola (constituency seat)
Candidate	Party or Coalition	Result
Petar Pejin	Democratic Opposition of Serbia	elected
Tihomir Đuričić	Serbian Radical Party	
other candidates		

=== Local (Kula) ===
2006 Kula municipal by-election Mayor of Kula - First and Second Round Results
Candidate	Party or Coalition	Votes	%	Votes	%
Svetozar Bukvić	Democratic Party	not listed	38.46	not listed	53.55
Tihomir Đuričić	Serbian Radical Party	not listed	32.78	not listed	46.45
Smiljana Vukelić	Socialist Party of Serbia	not listed	not listed	not listed	
Hercen Radonjić	Green Party (Stranka Zelenih)	not listed	not listed	not listed	
Stanko Studen	Citizens' Group: Patriotic Alliance of Kula	not listed	not listed	not listed	
Total valid votes		not listed	100	not listed	100

2004 Kula municipal election Mayor of Kula - First and Second Round Results
Candidate	Party or Coalition	Votes	%
Tihomir Đuričić - Tiho	Serbian Radical Party–Tomislav Nikolić	5,613	55.10
Slaviša Božović	Democratic Party–Boris Tadić	4,574	44.90
Svetozar Bukvić	Citizens' Group	eliminated in the first round	
Ratko Miletić	Socialist Party of Serbia–Yugoslav Communists	eliminated in the first round	
Željko Tatalović	Democratic Party of Serbia–Dr. Vojislav Koštunica	eliminated in the first round	
Stanko Zrakić	Citizens' Group: Stanko Zrakić	eliminated in the first round	
Saša Maksimović	Serbian Renewal Movement–Otpor Kula	eliminated in the first round	
Hercen Radonjić - Keka	Vojvodina Green Party–Hercen Radonjić Keka	eliminated in the first round	
Zoran Prekajac	G17 Plus–Miroljub Labus	eliminated in the first round	
Branislav Vlahović	Strength of Serbia Movement–Bogoljub Karić	eliminated in the first round	
Dr. Marija Popin	Liberals of Serbia	eliminated in the first round	
Milan Egić	Citizens' Group: Milan Egić	eliminated in the first round	
Total valid votes		10,187	100
