= Svetozar Bukvić =

Serbian politician (1958–2020)

Svetozar Bukvić (Serbian Cyrillic: Светозар Буквић; 25 April 1958–13 April 2020) was a politician in Serbia. He was the mayor of Kula from 2006 to 2011 and served in the Assembly of Vojvodina from 2008 to 2012. Bukvić was a member of the Democratic Party (Demokratska stranka, DS).

== Early life and private career ==
Bukvić was born in the village of Lipar in Kula, Autonomous Province of Vojvodina, in what was then the People's Republic of Serbia in the Federal People's Republic of Yugoslavia. He graduated from the University of Novi Sad's Faculty of Mechanical Engineering in 1981, worked as a designer with the company Inomag from 1985 to 1992, and was then a teacher of mechanical engineering at the secondary school "Mihajlo Pupin" in Kula until 2002. From 2003 to 2006, he was director of Kula's Institute for Construction.

== Politician ==
Serbia introduced the direct election of mayors in the 2004 Serbian local elections. Bukvić contested the election as an independent candidate and was defeated by Tihomir Đuričić of the far-right Serbian Radical Party (Srpska radikalna stranka, SRS). Ðuričić was defeated in a recall election in 2006; a by-election was held shortly thereafter to choose a new mayor, and Bukvić (who had by this time joined the DS) was elected in the second round of voting.

Bukvić became mayor of Kula at a time of political instability in the community. The municipal assembly was often dysfunctional, and in late 2007 fellow DS member Velibor Milojičić was appointed as leader of an interim administration. Bukvić continued to serve as mayor, but his control over the municipal government was limited.

The direct election of mayors was eliminated with the 2008 local elections; since this time, mayors in Serbia have been chosen by the elected members of city and municipal assemblies. The DS won a narrow victory over the SRS in Kula in 2008, and Bukvić was chosen afterward for a second term as mayor. He was also elected to the Vojvodina assembly in the concurrent 2008 provincial election, defeating Đuričić by a significant margin in the Kula constituency seat. The DS and its allies won a majority victory in the provincial election, and Bukvić served as a supporter of the administration.

Kula's government continued to be dysfunctional after the 2008 election, and the local DS board became increasingly divided between supporters of Bukvić and Milojićić. During the course of this feud, Milojičić accused Bukvić of corruption and incompetency in office. Milojičić subsequently left the DS and joined the United Regions of Serbia (Ujedinjeni regioni Srbije, URS). The municipal assembly became completely dysfunctional in mid-2011 when DS members began boycotting its proceedings. Milojičić charged that this was done to prevent Bukvić from being removed from office.

Bukvić ultimately resigned as mayor in late 2011, after a ruling that he could not continue to hold a dual mandate as a provincial assembly member. A provisional administration was established in December 2011.

Bukvić was not a candidate for re-election to the provincial assembly in 2012. The following year, he was appointed to a position in the provincial secretariat for economy and tourism. He remained in this role until his sudden death in 2020.

== Electoral record ==
=== Provincial (Vojvodina) ===
2008 Vojvodina assembly election Kula (constituency seat) - First and Second Rounds
Candidate	Party or Coalition	Votes	%	Votes	%
Svetozar Bukvić	For a European Vojvodina: Democratic Party–G17 Plus, Boris Tadić (Affiliation: Democratic Party)	9,774	42.44	8,033	64.02
Tihomir Đuričić Tiho (incumbent)	Serbian Radical Party	6,298	27.35	4,515	35.98
Dobrila Kalezić-Pindović	Socialist Party of Serbia (SPS)–Party of United Pensioners of Serbia (PUPS)	2,591	11.25		
Olena Papuga	"Together for Vojvodina–Nenad Čanak"	1,378	5.98		
Károly Valka	Hungarian Coalition–István Pásztor	1,138	4.94		
Tihomir Nićetin	Liberal Democratic Party	1,003	4.36		
József Solda	Democratic Party of Serbia–New Serbia–Vojislav Koštunica	848	3.68		
Total valid votes		23,030	100	12,548	100
Invalid ballots		958		244	
Total votes casts		23,988	62.75	12,792	33.46

=== Local (Kula) ===
2006 Kula municipal by-election Mayor of Kula - First and Second Round Results
Candidate	Party or Coalition	%	%
Svetozar Bukvić	Democratic Party	38.46	53.55
Tihomir Đuričić	Serbian Radical Party	32.78	46.45
Smiljana Vukelić	Socialist Party of Serbia	not listed	
Hercen Radonjić	Green Party (Stranka Zelenih)	not listed	
Stanko Studen	Citizens' Group: Patriotic Alliance of Kula	not listed	
Total valid votes		100	100

2004 Kula municipal election Mayor of Kula - First and Second Round Results
Candidate	Party or Coalition	Votes	%
Tihomir Đuričić - Tiho	Serbian Radical Party–Tomislav Nikolić	5,613	55.10
Slaviša Božović	Democratic Party–Boris Tadić	4,574	44.90
Svetozar Bukvić	Citizens' Group	eliminated in the first round	
Ratko Miletić	Socialist Party of Serbia–Yugoslav Communists	eliminated in the first round	
Željko Tatalović	Democratic Party of Serbia–Dr. Vojislav Koštunica	eliminated in the first round	
Stanko Zrakić	Citizens' Group: Stanko Zrakić	eliminated in the first round	
Saša Maksimović	Serbian Renewal Movement–Otpor Kula	eliminated in the first round	
Hercen Radonjić - Keka	Vojvodina Green Party–Hercen Radonjić Keka	eliminated in the first round	
Zoran Prekajac	G17 Plus–Miroljub Labus	eliminated in the first round	
Branislav Vlahović	Strength of Serbia Movement–Bogoljub Karić	eliminated in the first round	
Dr. Marija Popin	Liberals of Serbia	eliminated in the first round	
Milan Egić	Citizens' Group: Milan Egić	eliminated in the first round	
Total valid votes		10,187	100
