= Olena Papuga =

Serbian politician

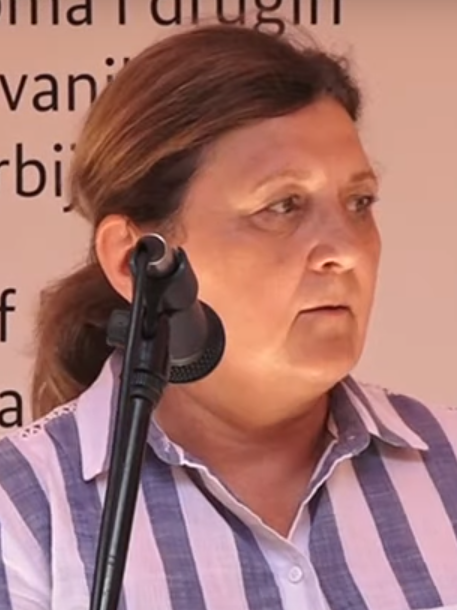
Papuga in 2022

Olena Papuga (Serbian Cyrillic: Олена Папуга; born June 10, 1964) is a Serbian politician. She served in the National Assembly of Serbia from 2008 to 2020 as a member of the League of Social Democrats of Vojvodina (LSV). She is a member of Serbia's Ruthenian (also called Rusyn) community and also serves as an elected member of the Ruthenian National Council.

== Early life and private career ==
Papuga was born in Ruski Krstur, Vojvodina, in what was then the Socialist Republic of Serbia in the Socialist Federal Republic of Yugoslavia. She graduated from the University of Novi Sad Faculty of Philosophy, with a focus on Russian and Serbo-Croatian language and literature. Papuga previously worked for the publisher Ruske slovo and is currently a columnist and translator. Her ethnology, Old Ruthenian House, has been published by the Society for Ruthenian Language in Novi Sad and by Društvo Rusina in Rijeka, Croatia.

== Political career ==
Papuga has been a member of the LSV since the early 1990s. She was an organizer for the party in Ruski Krstur and was involved in numerous protests against Slobodan Milošević's administration.

=== Member of the National Assembly ===
The LSV contested the 2008 Serbian parliamentary election on the Democratic Party's For a European Serbia electoral list. Papuga received the 158th position on the list, which was mostly arranged in alphabetical order; the list won 102 mandates, and Papuga was subsequently chosen as part of the LSV's assembly delegation. (From 2000 to 2011, Serbian parliamentary mandates were awarded to sponsoring parties or coalitions rather than to individual candidates, and it was common practice for mandates to be awarded out of numerical order. Papuga's relatively low position on the list did not prevent her from being awarded a mandate.) The Democratic Party and its allies formed a new coalition government with the Socialist Party of Serbia after the election, and Papuga served as part of its parliamentary majority.

Serbia's electoral system was reformed in 2011, such that parliamentary mandates were awarded in numerical order to candidates on successful lists. The LSV again contested the 2012 parliamentary election in an alliance with the Democratic Party; Papuga received the fifty-eighth position on their Choice for a Better Life list and was re-elected when the list won sixty-seven mandates. The Serbian Progressive Party and the Socialist Party formed a new coalition government after the election, and both the Democratic Party and the LSV moved into opposition.

The Democratic Party subsequently broke into different factions, and former party leader Boris Tadić established a new group initially called the New Democratic Party (later renamed as the Social Democratic Party (SDS)). The LSV contested both the 2014 parliamentary election and the 2016 parliamentary election in an alliance with Tadić's party. Papuga received a high list position on both occasions and was re-elected to the assembly each time. The Progressive Party has remained in government during this time, and the LSV has remained in opposition, its members currently serving in a parliamentary group called the Vojvodina Front–Serbia 21.

In the 2016–20 parliament, Papuga was a member of the assembly committee on human and minority rights and gender equality; a member of the committee on education, science, technological development, and the information society; a deputy member of the agriculture, forestry, and water management committee; a member of the working group for the political empowerment of persons with disabilities; a deputy member of Serbia's delegation to the Parliamentary Dimension of the Central European Initiative; and a member of the parliamentary friendship groups with Azerbaijan, Canada, Croatia, Hungary, Israel, Montenegro, Romania, Slovakia, and Ukraine.

Papuga, along with the LSV's other assembly members, supported a 2015 resolution to recognize the Srebrenica massacre as constituting an act of genocide. In 2017, the Croatian News Agency reported that she described an incident in Sonta, in which three Croat youths were attacked, as having been ethnically motivated. She was quoted as saying, "Serbian state institutions must not distort the truth and say that the incident in Sonta, which involved a number of persons, has nothing to do with the ethnic background of people involved in it. Unfortunately, the residents of Sonta know that the incident was ethnically motivated. Also, charges are about to be pressed as some of the people involved have a criminal past for which they never answered."

She unsuccessfully sought re-election in the 2020 Serbian parliamentary election, appearing at the nineteenth position on the United Democratic Serbia coalition list.

=== Provincial ===
In 2011, Papuga registered a political party called "Together for Vojvodina," representing the province's Ruthenian minority. She remained a member of the LSV, and the parties co-operated at the provincial level.

Papuga sought election for the Kula division (which includes Ruski Krstur) in both the 2008 and 2012 provincial elections. She was defeated both times. Vojvodina subsequently switched to a system of proportional representation for the 2016 provincial election, and Papuga received the fifteenth position on the LSV's list. The party won nine seats, and Papuga has not as yet served with its group in the Assembly of Vojvodina.

=== Ruthenian National Council ===
The first direct elections for Serbia's national minority councils were held in 2010. Papuga founded the Ruska liga to contest the elections for the Ruthenian National Council and was elected when her list won five seats. She appeared in the first position on the same list in the 2014 elections and was elected when it won four mandates. No group won a majority of seats on the council in 2014, and Papuga was subsequently chosen as its vice-president.

== Electoral record ==
=== Provincial (Vojvodina) ===
2012 Vojvodina assembly election Kula (constituency seat) - First and Second Rounds
Candidate	Party or Coalition	Votes	%	Votes	%
Jovan Janić	Choice for a Better Vojvodina (Affiliation: Democratic Party)	4,688	21.38	10,017	56.28
Pero Ergarac	Let's Get Vojvodina Moving (Serbian Progressive Party, New Serbia, Movement of Socialists, Strength of Serbia Movement)	3,358	15.31	7,780	43.72
Aleksandar Zrakić	Socialist Party of Serbia–Party of United Pensioners of Serbia–United Serbia–Social Democratic Party of Serbia	3,024	13.79		
Radoslav Smiljanić	Democratic Party of Serbia	2,300	10.49		
Aleksandar Arvaji	United Regions of Serbia	2,049	9.34		
Tihomir Đuričić Tiho	Serbian Radical Party	1,653	7.54		
Olena Papuga	League of Social Democrats of Vojvodina–Nenad Čanak	1,619	7.38		
Vladimir Nikolić	Citizens' Group: Dveri	1,251	5.70		
Károly Valka	Alliance of Vojvodina Hungarians	1,178	5.37		
Mirjana Obradov	U-Turn	809	3.69		
Total valid votes		21,929	100	17,797	100

2008 Vojvodina assembly election Kula (constituency seat) - First and Second Rounds
Candidate	Party or Coalition	Votes	%	Votes	%
Svetozar Bukvić	For a European Vojvodina: Democratic Party–G17 Plus, Boris Tadić (Affiliation: Democratic Party)	9,774	42.44	8,033	64.02
Tihomir Đuričić Tiho (incumbent)	Serbian Radical Party	6,298	27.35	4,515	35.98
Dobrila Kalezić-Pindović	Socialist Party of Serbia (SPS)–Party of United Pensioners of Serbia (PUPS)	2,591	11.25		
Olena Papuga	"Together for Vojvodina–Nenad Čanak"	1,378	5.98		
Károly Valka	Hungarian Coalition–István Pásztor	1,138	4.94		
Tihomir Nićetin	Liberal Democratic Party	1,003	4.36		
József Solda	Democratic Party of Serbia–New Serbia–Vojislav Koštunica	848	3.68		
Total valid votes		23,030	100	12,548	100
Invalid ballots		958		244	
Total votes casts		23,988	62.75	12,792	33.46
