= Zoran Milošević =

Zoran Milošević may refer to:

- Zoran Milošević (Serbian footballer)
- Zoran Milošević (Serbian politician, born 1949), former cabinet minister in Vojvodina
- Zoran Milošević (Serbian politician, born 1958), former member of parliament
- Zoran Milošević (Serbian politician, born 1974), former member of parliament
