= Jovan Janić =

Serbian medical doctor and politician

Jovan Janić (Serbian Cyrillic: Јован Јанић; born 1952) is a medical doctor and politician in Serbia. He served in the Assembly of Vojvodina from 2012 to 2016 as a member of the Democratic Party (Demokratska stranka, DS).

== Private career ==
Janić is a specialist doctor in general surgery from Kula, Vojvodina. In January 2015, he was appointed as director of the Vrbas General Hospital.

== Politician ==
Janić was elected to the Vojvodina assembly in the 2012 Vojvodina provincial election for the Kula constituency seat. The DS won the election, and Janić served as a government supporter. He was also elected to the Kula municipal assembly in the concurrent 2012 Serbian local elections, although he resigned his mandate on 28 May 2012. In the provincial assembly, he was a member of the committee on petitions and proposals and the committee on health, social policy, and labour.

Vojvodina switched to a system of full proportional representation for the 2016 provincial election. Janić was given the forty-first position on the DS coalition's list and was not re-elected when the list won only ten mandates.

== Electoral record ==
=== Provincial (Vojvodina) ===
2012 Vojvodina assembly election Kula (constituency seat) - First and Second Rounds
Candidate	Party or Coalition	Votes	%	Votes	%
Jovan Janić	Choice for a Better Vojvodina (Affiliation: Democratic Party)	4,688	21.38	10,017	56.28
Pero Ergarac	Let's Get Vojvodina Moving (Serbian Progressive Party, New Serbia, Movement of Socialists, Strength of Serbia Movement)	3,358	15.31	7,780	43.72
Aleksandar Zrakić	Socialist Party of Serbia–Party of United Pensioners of Serbia–United Serbia–Social Democratic Party of Serbia	3,024	13.79		
Radoslav Smiljanić	Democratic Party of Serbia	2,300	10.49		
Aleksandar Arvaji	United Regions of Serbia	2,049	9.34		
Tihomir Đuričić Tiho	Serbian Radical Party	1,653	7.54		
Olena Papuga	League of Social Democrats of Vojvodina–Nenad Čanak	1,619	7.38		
Vladimir Nikolić	Citizens' Group: Dveri	1,251	5.70		
Károly Valka	Alliance of Vojvodina Hungarians	1,178	5.37		
Mirjana Obradov	U-Turn	809	3.69		
Total valid votes		21,929	100	17,797	100
