= Dejan Mihaljica =

Serbian politician

Dejan Mihaljica (Serbian Cyrillic: Дејан Михаљица; born 31 December 1973) is a politician in Serbia. Formerly a member of the Serbian Renewal Movement (Srpski pokret obnove, SPO), he joined the breakaway Movement for the Restoration of the Kingdom of Serbia (Pokret obnove Kraljevine Srbije, POKS) in 2017. Mihaljica served in the Assembly of Vojvodina from 2016 to 2020.

== Early life and career ==
Mihlajica graduated from the University of Novi Sad Faculty of Sports and Tourism, with a focus on marketing in sports. He is a marketing manager and has been the owner of Nova Trgovina for several years.

== Politician ==
The SPO contested the 2012 Vojvodina provincial election and the concurrent 2012 Serbian local elections in the Preokret ("U-Turn") alliance with the Liberal Democratic Party and other parties. Mihaljica received the lead position on the alliance's electoral list in Temerin and was elected when the list won two mandates. He also appeared on the alliance's list for the provincial election. This list did not cross the electoral threshold to win representation in the Vojvodina assembly.

The SPO subsequently joined an alliance led by the Serbian Progressive Party. Mihaljica received the fourteenth position on the Progressive-led list in the 2016 Vojvodina provincial election and was elected when the list won a majority victory with sixty-three mandates. He also received the second position on the Progressive list for the Temerin municipal assembly in the 2016 Serbian local elections and was re-elected when the list won a narrow local majority with seventeen out of thirty-three mandates. Following the election, he was appointed to the municipal council (i.e., the executive branch of the municipal government) with responsibility for local economic development and investments. His time in the latter role was brief, as he could not hold a dual mandate as a provincial assembly member and a member of the municipal council. He ultimately chose to serve in the assembly and resigned from council on 19 July 2016. He chaired the culture and information committee in the provincial assembly.

The SPO experienced a serious split in 2017, and several critics of Vuk Drašković's leadership left to form the POKS. Mihaljca was among those who joined the new party, serving as the first president of its regional board in Vojvodina. He received the eleventh position on the POKS list for the Vojvodina assembly in the 2020 provincial election and was not re-elected when the list won five mandates.

He also received the fourth position on the POKS list for Temerin in the 2020 local elections and was elected to a third term in the local assembly when the list won four seats. (Strangely, Mihaljica received an endorsement from the Monarchist Front, a small group that contested the election in an alliance with the POKS, at the municipal level.) He resigned his mandate on 21 August 2020.
