= Association of Free and Independent Trade Unions =

Trade union federation in Serbia

- Асоцијација слободних и независних синдиката Asocijacija slobodnih i nezavisnih sindikata
- Formation: 2 July 1996; 28 years ago
- President: Ranka Savić
- Affiliations: Labour Party of Serbia (former political wing)
- Website: asns.rs

The Association of Free and Independent Trade Unions (Serbian Cyrillic: Асоцијација слободних и независних синдиката, romanized: Asocijacija slobodnih i nezavisnih sindikata, ASNS) is a trade union federation in Serbia that was founded in 1996. The federation has five branches, respectively in industry, traffic and utilities, agriculture and tobacco, public service, and health and social protection. Dragan Milovanović was the federation's president from its founding until 2001, when he resigned to serve as minister of labour and employment in Serbia's government. Ranka Savić has served as the federation's president since 2002.

The ASNS took part in various protests against Slobodan Milošević's administration between 1996 and 2000 and was a member of the Democratic Opposition of Serbia (DOS) from 2000 to 2003.

== Early history ==
The ASNS was founded on 2 July 1996 under the leadership of Dragan Milovanović, who had previously been general secretary of the Independent Union of Metalworkers of Serbia. In September of the same year, the union announced its support for the opposition Zajedno (English: Together) coalition in the 1996 Yugoslavian parliamentary election and the 1996 Serbian local elections. Milovanović was quoted as saying, "We joined Zajedno because there is a clear division in this country between those who support democracy, economic recovery, and a return to civilization, and, on the other side, local feudal overlords, men of power, war profiteers, and latifundists of the South American type. We chose which side to be on."

Zajedno won the local elections in Belgrade and other major cities, but its victories were not initially accepted by the state authorities, leading to an extended series of protests throughout the country. Milovanović led the ASNS into the protests in December 1996, an event considered significant in that it was the first time organized labour had taken part in a major anti-government action in Milošević's Serbia. The state ultimately recognized most of the opposition's victories via a lex specialis in February 1997. Milovanović continued to represent the ASNS in subsequent protests against the administration.

== Democratic Opposition of Serbia ==
The ASNS became part of the Democratic Opposition of Serbia, a broad and ideologically diverse coalition of parties opposed to Milošević's rule, in early 2000. DOS candidate Vojislav Koštunica defeated Milošević in the 2000 Yugoslavian presidential election, a watershed moment in Serbian and Yugoslavian politics. As in 1996, the Milošević regime did not initially accept the opposition's victory, and Milovanović and the ASNS were active in the protests that ultimately brought down the administration on 5 September 2000.

The DOS also defeated the SPS in the concurrent election for the Yugoslavian parliament. Milovanović was personally elected to the assembly's Chamber of Citizens with a co-endorsement from the ASNS and the Democratic Party (Demokratska stranka, DS). He was also elected to the City Assembly of Belgrade as an ASNS candidate in the concurrent 2000 Serbian local elections.

The Serbian government fell after Milošević's defeat in the Yugoslavian election, and a new Serbian parliamentary election was held in December 2000. The DOS won a landslide majority victory, and Bratislav Đurić was elected to the national assembly with an ASNS endorsement. Zoran Đinđić was appointed as Serbia's prime minister in January 2001, and Milovanović became minister of labour and employment in the new government. He resigned from the ASNS leadership to avoid being in a conflict-of-interest situation and was replaced on an interim basis by Đurić. Ranka Savić was elected as the federation's president at its second congress in October 2002.

The ASNS faced strong opposition in this period from the Confederation of Autonomous Trade Unions of Serbia (Savez Samostalnih Sindikata Srbije, SSSS), which had generally been aligned with Milošević.

On 19 October 2002, the ASNS established the Labour Party of Serbia (Laburisticka partija Srbije, LPS) as its political wing. Milovanović served as the party's leader. The LPS contested the 2003 Serbian parliamentary election on its own and fared poorly, falling below the electoral threshold. The party largely became dormant after this time, and Milovanović stood down from cabinet when a new government was formed in March 2004.

== Later political activities ==
The ASNS contested the 2012 Serbian parliamentary election in an alliance with the Liberal Democratic Party (Liberalno demokratska partija, LDP). Savić was elected to the Serbian parliament on the LDP-led Preokret (English: U-Turn) list; Milovanović also appeared as a candidate. During the campaign, Savić argued that engagement with the political system was the only way for the union to achieve its goals.

Both Savić and Milovanović later appeared on the LDP's list in the 2014 parliamentary election. The list fell below the electoral threshold.

== Current activities ==
The ASNS had continued to advocate for the rights of workers in Serbia. Amid worsening financial conditions in September 2022, the federation submitted a comprehensive request to the Serbian government that included a minimum wage increase, a reduction in the excise tax on fuel, a temporary removal of the value added tax for basic life products, and a cap on price increases on food and related products. Savić added that she did not expect the government to respond and left open the possibility of street protests.
