= 6th National Assembly =

6th National Assembly may refer to:

- 6th National Assembly of France
- 6th National Assembly of Laos
- 6th National Assembly of Namibia
- 6th National Assembly of Nigeria
- 6th National Assembly of Serbia
- 6th National Assembly of Slovenia
