= Stanko Studen =

Serbian politician

Stanko Studen (Serbian Cyrillic: Станко Студен; born 31 March 1946) is a former politician in Serbia. He served in the National Assembly of Serbia from 1994 to 1998 and was Serbia's deputy minister of agriculture from 1998 to 2000. During his time as an elected official, Studen was a member of the far-right Serbian Radical Party (Srpska radikalna stranka, SRS).

== Early life and career ==
Studen was born in Vrbas, in what was then the People's Republic of Serbia in the Federal People's Republic of Yugoslavia. He trained as a medical doctor, receiving a Ph.D. from the University of Zagreb's Faculty of Pharmacy and Biochemistry (Department of Medical Biochemistry) in 1991. He subsequently lived in Kula.

== Politician ==
Studen appeared in the thirteen position on the Radical Party's electoral list for the Novi Sad division in the 1993 Serbian parliamentary election. The list won seven seats, and he was included in the party's assembly delegation. (From 1992 to 2000, Serbia's electoral law stipulated that one-third of parliamentary mandates would be assigned to candidates from successful lists in numerical order, while the remaining two-thirds would be distributed amongst other candidates at the discretion of the sponsoring parties. It was common practice for the latter mandates to be awarded out of order. Studen's comparatively low position on the list did not prevent him from receiving a mandate.) Studen took his seat when the assembly convened in January 1994. The Socialist Party of Serbia (Socijalistička partija Srbije, SPS) won the election, and the Radicals served in opposition.

Studen was given the lead position on the SRS's list for the redistributed Sombor division in the 1997 parliamentary election and was given an automatic mandate when the list won three seats. The SPS won the election again, but the Radicals significantly increased their seat total. In March 1998, the Radicals joined a coalition government led by the Socialists. Studen was appointed as deputy minister of agriculture, working with Socialist Party minister Jovan Babović. By virtue of holding this position, he was required to resign from parliament, which he did on 26 May 1998. In February 2000, in the aftermath of the Kosovo War, he was one of a number of Serbian ad Yugoslavian officials placed on a six-month travel ban to European Union countries.

The Federal Republic of Yugoslavia (consisting of Serbia and Montenegro) introduced direct election for its parliament's upper house (i.e., the Chamber of Republics) in the 2000 general election; the vote was conducted under proportional representation. Studen appeared in the seventh position on the Radical Party's list; the Radicals only won two seats, and he was not elected. He also ran for Kula's second division in the concurrent 2000 Vojvodina provincial election and for the municipality's sixth seat in the 2000 Serbian local elections and was defeated in both contests.

Slobodan Milošević was defeated for the Yugoslavian presidency in the 2000 election, a watershed moment in Serbian and Yugoslavian politics. Serbia's government fell shortly after the Yugoslavian vote, and an interim ministry was established that did not include the Radicals; Studen's term as deputy minister came to an end in October 2000. A new Serbian parliamentary election was held in December of the same year; prior to the election, Serbia's electoral laws were reformed such that the entire country was counted as a single electoral division and all mandates were awarded to candidates at the discretion of the sponsoring parties or coalitions, irrespective of numerical order. Studen was given the thirty-third position on the Radical Party's list. The list won twenty-three mandates, and he was not included in the party's delegation. He later left the Radical Party.

Serbia introduced the direct election of mayors in the 2004 Serbian local elections. Radical Party candidate Tihomir Đuričić was elected as mayor of Kula and but defeated in a recall election in 2006. Studen was a candidate in the subsequent mayoral by-election, running as the candidate for a local coalition called the "Patriotic Alliance of Kula." He was defeated in the first round of voting.

== Electoral record ==
=== Provincial (Vojvodina) ===
2000 Vojvodina assembly election Kula II (constituency seat)
Candidate	Party or Coalition	Result
Dr. Marija Popin	Democratic Opposition of Serbia (Affiliation: New Democracy)	elected
Stanko Studen	Serbian Radical Party	
other candidates		

=== Local (Kula) ===
2006 Kula municipal by-election Mayor of Kula - First and Second Round Results
Candidate	Party or Coalition	Votes	%	Votes	%
Svetozar Bukvić	Democratic Party	not listed	38.46	not listed	53.55
Tihomir Đuričić	Serbian Radical Party	not listed	32.78	not listed	46.45
Smiljana Vukelić	Socialist Party of Serbia	not listed	not listed	not listed	
Hercen Radonjić	Green Party (Stranka Zelenih)	not listed	not listed	not listed	
Stanko Studen	Citizens' Group: Patriotic Alliance of Kula	not listed	not listed	not listed	
Total valid votes		not listed	100	not listed	100
