= Crvenka (disambiguation) =

Crvenka is a town in Kula municipality, Serbia.

Crvenka may also refer to:

- Crvenka, Belgrade, a suburban settlement of Belgrade, Serbia
- Nova Crvenka, a village in the Kula municipality, Serbia
