= Salatić =

Salatić (Serbian: Салатић) is a Bosnian surname. Notable people with this surname include:

- Dušan Salatić (born 1929), professor and writer
- Vero Salatić (born 1985), Bosnian born Swiss footballer
