= Velibor Milojičić =

Serbian politician

Velibor Milojičić (Serbian Cyrillic: Велибор Милојичић; born 1963) is a politician in Serbia. He briefly served as mayor of Kula in 2018 and has been a member of the National Assembly of Serbia since 2020. Milojičić is a member of the Serbian Progressive Party (Srpska napredna stranka, SNS).

== Private life ==
Milojičić has a bachelor's degree in economics. He lives in the village of Sivac in Kula.

== Politician ==
=== Municipal politics ===
Milojičić entered political life as a member of the Democratic Party (Demokratska stranka, DS). He became president of Kula's provisional council in 2007 and was chosen as president (i.e., speaker) of its municipal assembly after the 2008 Serbian local elections. He was removed from the latter position in March 2010 against the backdrop of a serious split in the local DS board. His opponents said that Milojičić had been removed from office for his criticisms of mayor Svetozar Bukvić. Milojičić contended that his dismissal was illegal and initially tried to convene an alternate session of the assembly that was not approved by the official body.

He created a local political movement called "6 Oktobar" in October 2010. The following year, he joined the United Regions of Serbia (Ujedinjeni regioni Srbije, URS). He was re-elected as a URS candidate in the 2012 local elections when the party's electoral list won two mandates and was chosen as Kula's deputy mayor when a new coalition government including the URS was formed in October 2012.

Milojičić received the eightieth position on the URS's electoral list in the 2014 Serbian parliamentary election. The party fell below the electoral threshold to win seats in the national assembly and dissolved shortly thereafter. In June 2015, Milojičić joined the Progressive Party. He received the fourth position on the party's coalition list for the 2016 local elections and was re-elected when the list won a narrow majority with nineteen out of thirty-seven seats. He once again became president of the assembly after the election.

Milojičić became mayor of Kula at a time of political upheaval in the municipality, and his term in office was brief. He was selected as mayor by the assembly on 11 June 2018, following the resignation of the previous officeholder, Perica Videkanjić. Milojičić himself resigned as mayor in September, which resulted in the municipality being placed under a provisional administration (led by Milojičić) pending new local elections. He again received the fourth position on the Progressive list in the 2018 elections and was elected to another term when the Progressive won twenty-six mandates. When the new municipal assembly met in January 2019, he did not seek a new appointment as mayor but was instead chosen for another term as president of the assembly. He resigned from this role on 3 August 2020.

=== Parliamentarian ===
Milojičić received the 143rd position on the Progressive Party's Aleksandar Vučić — For Our Children list in the 2020 Serbian parliamentary election and was elected to the assembly when the list won a landslide majority with 188 out of 250 mandates. He is now a member of the committee on the judiciary, public administration, and local self-government; a deputy member of the environmental protection committee and the committee on finance, state budget, and control of public spending; and a member of the parliamentary friendship groups with Austria, Italy, Montenegro, and Slovenia.
