= Marija Popin =

Serbian politician

Marija Popin (Serbian Cyrillic: Марија Попин; born 1947) is a medical doctor and former politician in Serbia. She served in the Assembly of Vojvodina from 2000 to 2004 as a member of New Democracy (Nova demokratija, ND), which changed its name to the Liberals of Serbia (Liberali Srbije, LS) in 2003.

== Private career ==
Popin is a medical doctor based in Kula.

== Politician ==
In early 2000, New Democracy joined the Democratic Opposition of Serbia (Demokratska opozicija Srbije, DOS), a broad and diverse coalition of parties opposed to Slobodan Milošević's administration. Popin was elected to the Vojvodina assembly in the 2000 provincial election as a DOS candidate, winning in Kula's second constituency seat. The DOS coalition won a landslide majority, and Popin served for the next four years as a supporter of the administration. She did not seek re-election at the provincial level in 2004.

She appeared in the thirty-seventh position on the Liberals of Serbia electoral list in the 2003 Serbian parliamentary election. The list did not cross the electoral threshold to win representation in the assembly.

Serbia introduced the direct election of mayors in the 2004 local elections. Popin ran as the LS candidate in Kula and was defeated in the first round of voting.

== Electoral record ==
=== Local (Kula) ===
2004 Kula municipal election Mayor of Kula - First and Second Round Results
Candidate	Party or Coalition	Votes	%
Tihomir Đuričić - Tiho	Serbian Radical Party–Tomislav Nikolić	5,613	55.10
Slaviša Božović	Democratic Party–Boris Tadić	4,574	44.90
Svetozar Bukvić	Citizens' Group	eliminated in the first round	
Ratko Miletić	Socialist Party of Serbia–Yugoslav Communists	eliminated in the first round	
Željko Tatalović	Democratic Party of Serbia–Dr. Vojislav Koštunica	eliminated in the first round	
Stanko Zrakić	Citizens' Group: Stanko Zrakić	eliminated in the first round	
Saša Maksimović	Serbian Renewal Movement–Otpor Kula	eliminated in the first round	
Hercen Radonjić - Keka	Vojvodina Green Party–Hercen Radonjić Keka	eliminated in the first round	
Zoran Prekajac	G17 Plus–Miroljub Labus	eliminated in the first round	
Branislav Vlahović	Strength of Serbia Movement–Bogoljub Karić	eliminated in the first round	
Dr. Marija Popin	Liberals of Serbia	eliminated in the first round	
Milan Egić	Citizens' Group: Milan Egić	eliminated in the first round	
Total valid votes		10,187	100

=== Provincial (Vojvodina) ===
2000 Vojvodina assembly election Kula II (constituency seat)
Candidate	Party or Coalition	Result
Dr. Marija Popin	Democratic Opposition of Serbia (Affiliation: New Democracy)	elected
Stanko Studen	Serbian Radical Party	
other candidates		
