= List of members of the National Assembly of Serbia, 2003–2007 =

This is a list of the 250 members of the 2003–2007 National Assembly of Serbia, as well as a list of former members of the 2003–2007 National Assembly.

The 2003–2007 National Assembly was elected in the 2003 parliamentary election, and it held its first session on 27 January 2004. The 2003–2007 National Assembly was the 6th assembly since the reestablishment of the multi-party system, after the 1990 parliamentary election.

== MNAs by party ==
Name	Abbr.	Leader	Ideology	Political position	MPs	Gov′t
Serbian Radical Party; Српска радикална странка Srpska radikalna stranka	SRS	Tomislav Nikolić	Serbian nationalism Right-wing populism	Right-wing to far-right	82 / 250	O
Democratic Party of Serbia; Демократска странка Србије; Demokratska stranka Srbije	DSS	Vojislav Koštunica	National conservatism Christian democracy	Centre-right	53 / 250	G
Democratic Party; Демократска странка Demokratska stranka	DS	Boris Tadić	Social democracy Social liberalism	Centre to centre-left	32 / 250	O
G17 Plus; Г17 Плус; G17 Plus	G17+	Miroljub Labus	Liberal conservatism Pro-Europeanism	Centre to centre-right	31 / 250	G
Socialist Party of Serbia; Социјалистичка партија Србије; Socijalistička partija Srbije	SPS	Ivica Dačić	Democratic socialism Left-wing populism	Centre-left to left-wing	22 / 250	S
Serbian Renewal Movement; Српски покрет обнове Srpski pokret obnove	SPO	Vuk Drašković	Monarchism; Atlanticism	Centre-right	13 / 250	G
New Serbia; Нова Србија; Nova Srbija	NS	Velimir Ilić	Right-wing populism Monarchism	Right-wing	9 / 250	G
Civic Alliance of Serbia; Грађански савез Србије; Građanski savez Srbije	GSS	Goran Svilanović	Liberalism; Atlanticism	Centre	4 / 250	O
Social Democratic Party; Социјалдемократска партија Socijaldemokratska partija	SDP	Slobodan Lalović	Social democracy Pro-Europeanism	Centre-left	3 / 250	G
Social Democratic Union; Социјалдемократска унија Socijaldemokratska unija	SDU	Žarko Korać	Social democracy Pro-Europeanism	Centre-left	2 / 250	O
Party of Democratic Action of Sandžak; Странка демократске акције Санџака; Stranka demokratske akcije Sandžaka	SDA S	Sulejman Ugljanin	Bosniak minority politics Bosniak nationalism	Right-wing	2 / 250	O
Party for Democratic Action; Партија за демократско деловање Partija za demokratsko delovanje	PDD	Riza Halimi	Albanian minority politics Regionalism	Right-wing	1 / 250	O
