= Zoran Milošević (Serbian politician, born 1974) =

Serbian politician

Zoran M. Milošević (Serbian Cyrillic: Зоран М. Милошевић; born 22 October 1974) is a Serbian politician. He has served in the Serbian parliament and the Belgrade city assembly as a member of the far-right Serbian Radical Party (SRS).

== Private career ==
Milošević was still a student when he was elected to the Serbian national assembly in 1997. He later became a graduated engineer of labour organization.

== Politician ==
Milošević appeared in the fourth position on the Radical Party's electoral list for the Čukarica division in the 1997 Serbian parliamentary election. The list won exactly four seats, and he was chosen for a mandate. (From 1992 to 2000, Serbia's electoral law stipulated that one-third of parliamentary mandates would be assigned to candidates from successful lists in numerical order, while the remaining two-thirds would be distributed amongst other candidates at the discretion of the sponsoring parties. Milošević was not automatically elected by virtue of his list position, but he received a seat in the assembly all the same.) The Radicals won eighty-two seats in total, finishing second against the coalition around the Socialist Party of Serbia (SPS). In early 1998, the SPS, SRS, and Yugoslav Left (JUL) formed a coalition government, and Milošević served as a supporter of the ministry.

Serbia's longtime leader Slobodan Milošević (no relation) fell from power on 5 October 2000, after losing the 2000 Yugoslavian presidential election to Vojislav Koštunica; this was a watershed moment in Serbian politics. Zoran Milošević ran for both the Belgrade city assembly and the Rakovica municipal assembly in the 2000 Serbian local elections, which took place concurrently with the Yugoslavian vote, and was defeated in both contests. The 2000 local election cycle was the last to take place with voting in single-member constituencies; all subsequent local elections have taken place under proportional representation.

The Serbian government fell after Slobodan Milošević's defeat in the Yugoslavian vote, and a transitional government took office pending a new Serbian parliamentary election later in the year; the new government did not include the Radicals, who moved into opposition. Serbia's electoral system was reformed prior to the vote, such that the entire country became a single at-large electoral division and all mandates were awarded to candidates on successful lists at the discretion of the sponsoring parties, irrespective of numerical order. Zoran Milošević appeared in the 191st position on the Radical Party's list and did not receive a new mandate when the list won twenty-three seats. His term ended when the new assembly convened in January 2001.

Milošević later appeared in the seventy-fifth position on the Radical Party's list in the 2003 Serbian parliamentary election. Although the list won eighty-two seats, he was again not chosen for a mandate.

Milošević was given the eighth position on the Radical Party's list for the 2004 Belgrade city election. For this contest, the first one-third of each party's mandates were assigned in numerical order; the Radical Party won twenty-seven seats, and he was automatically elected. The Democratic Party (DS) won the election with thirty-four seats, and Milošević served as a member of the opposition for the full term that followed. He was not a candidate in 2008.

== Electoral record ==
=== Local (City of Belgrade) ===
2000 Belgrade city election: Rakovica Division 6
Candidate	Party	Votes	%
Slobodan Lalović	Democratic Opposition of Serbia (Affiliation: Social Democracy		elected
Predrag Dokmanović (incumbent)	Serbian Renewal Movement		
Zvonimir Jovanović	Serbia Together		
Đorđe Maljević	Radical Party of Serbia		
Zoran Milošević	Serbian Radical Party		
Dragan Smiljanić	Socialist Party of Serbia–Yugoslav Left		
Total			
Source: All candidates except Lalović are listed alphabetically.

=== Municipal (Rakovica) ===
2000 Rakovica municipal election: Division 38
Candidate	Party	Votes	%
Zoran Milošević	Serbian Radical Party		defeated
other candidates			
Total			
