= Labour Party of Serbia =

Political party in Serbia

Labour Party of Serbia Лабуристичка партија Србије Laburisticka partija Srbije
- Abbreviation: LPS
- Chairman: Dragan Milovanović
- Founded: 19 October 2002
- Dissolved: 20 April 2010
- Ideology: Social democracy Trade unionism
- Political position: Centre-left
- National affiliation: Democratic Opposition of Serbia
- Trade union affiliation: Association of Free and Independent Trade Unions
- Colours: Blue

Website
- lps.org.yu (archived)

The Labour Party of Serbia (Serbian: Лабуристичка партија Србије, romanized: Laburisticka partija Srbije; abbr. ЛПС or LPS) was a social democratic political party in Serbia. It was established in 2002 as the political wing of Serbia's Association of Free and Independent Trade Unions (Asocijacija slobodnih i nezavisnih sindikata, ASNS), and for the early part of its existence it was a constituent member of the Democratic Opposition of Serbia (Demokratska opozicija Srbije, DOS). The party largely became inactive after a poor showing in the 2003 Serbian parliamentary election.

The LPS's leader was Dragan Milovanović, who was the minister of labour and employment in Serbia's government from 2001 in 2004.

== Party history ==
The Association of Free and Independent Trade Unions became a founding member of the Democratic Opposition of Serbia, a broad and ideologically diverse coalition of parties opposed to Slobodan Milošević's administration, in 2000. A trade union federation rather than a political party as such, it nonetheless acted as a full member of the coalition.

DOS candidate Vojislav Koštunica defeated Milošević in the 2000 Yugoslavian presidential election, a watershed moment in Serbian and Yugoslavian politics. In the concurrent Yugoslavian parliamentary election, ASNS leader Dragan Milovanović was elected to the Chamber of Citizens with a combined endorsement from the ASNS and the Democratic Party (Demokratska stranka, DS). In the 2000 Serbian parliamentary election held three months later, Bratislav Đurić was elected with an ASNS endorsement.

On 19 October 2002, the main board of the ASNS voted to create the Labour Party of Serbia as its political wing. Milovanović was chosen as its leader, and the ASNS transferred its membership in the DOS to the new party.

== 2003 election and after ==
The Labour Party of Serbia contested the 2003 Serbian parliamentary election with its own electoral list. Prior to the vote, the party signed electoral alliances with the Peasants Party of Serbia and the Serb National Council of Kosovo and Metohija.

The party fared very poorly in the election, receiving only 4,666 votes (0.12%) and falling well below the electoral threshold. Milovanović later criticized DS leader Zoran Živković for not fielding a united DOS list in the election, as was initially planned.

Milovanović was re-elected as leader of the Labour Party of Serbia in December 2004, although the party largely ceased operations after this time. In 2007, Milovanović said that the LPS was planning to field candidates in a limited number of municipalities in the following year's local elections. The party appears to have disappeared shortly thereafter.
