= Nenad Prokić =

Serbian playwright and theatre director

Nenad Prokić GCPMM, OFS is a Serbian playwright, theatre director, one of the founders of the Liberal Democratic Party (Liberalno demokratska partija) and professor of 20th Century Drama at University of Arts in Belgrade (Univerzitet umetnosti u Beogradu) from 1995, he was the playwright-in-residence at Yugoslav Drama Theatre (Jugoslovensko dramsko pozorište, JDP Beograd) in Belgrade (1985–1995) and at Slovenian National Theatre (Slovensko narodno gledališče, SNG Maribor) in Maribor (1991–1995). He has served as the Director of Belgrade International Theatre Festival (Bitef) and Bitef theatre (Bitef teatar) in two consecutive mandates (1997–2005).

== Biography ==
Prokić is one of the founders of Belgrade Circle (Beogradski krug) and of Forum of Writers (Forum pisaca). He is the author of the novel Alpha Foxtrot and of numerous theatre plays. His play Metastable Grail (Metastabilni Graal) is in the Anthology of Contemporary Serbian Drama. Other plays include: House of Bergmann, Fear for the Border, Homo Volans, Fathers and Forefathers (Dramatisation of Slobodan Selenic), In the Search of Marcel Proust, Dantes Divinus, The Russian Mission, The Last Days of Mankind (Adaptation of Karl Kraus), Le Petit et le Grand Theatre du Marquis de Sade, Edelheim, Finger Trigger Bullet Gun, Thankless Croatian Son (TV Script about A.G Matoš)...

The last premieres of his plays were held in Halifax (James Dunn Theatre), Canada; London (LIFT Festival) and Birmingham (BE Festival), UK.

Prokić directed the following pieces for the theater: Follie a Deux (Adaptation) by Heiner Mueller (Yugoslav Drama Theater), The Servants by Jean Genet (Bitef Theater), Helver's Night by Ingmar Villqist (Bitef Theater), Let's Talk About Life and Death by Krzysztof Byzio (Bitef Theater), The Unapproachable and Mercy Payable in Advance by Zanussi/Zebrowsky (Bitef Theater), Faraway by Tamara Bosak (Bitef Theater). Nenad Prokić wrote Absent Discourse Voices thesis dedicated to the work of Karl Kraus.

Prokić was MP in the Parliament of Serbia in two consecutive mandates and he is the Founder and the first President of the Friendship group with Sovereign Military Order of Malta in the Serbian Parliament. The Prince and Grand Master of the Sovereign Military Hospitaller Order of Saint John of Jerusalem, of Rhodes and of Malta, fra Matthew Festing decorated Prokic with the knightly PRO MERITO MELITENSI Cross of Grand Officer of the Sovereign Military Order of Malta, on June 15, 2012.

Since October 2014 Nenad Prokić is an Advisor for Humanitarian Issues at the Embassy of Sovereign Military Order of Malta to the Republic of Serbia. He is a diplomat of the Sovereign Military Order of Malta and serves as the Deputy Head of Mission, Minister-Counselor, at the Embassy of the Order to the Republic of Serbia since 2024.

== Distinctions ==
- Grand Cross Pro merito Melitensi

== Quotes ==
- "Serbia will become a modern country—with Serbs or without them!" [applause] - during the party's founding session.
