= Zoran Milošević (Serbian politician, born 1949) =

Zoran Milošević (Serbian Cyrillic: Зоран Милошевић; born 1949) is a Serbian politician. He was a member of the Executive Council of Vojvodina from 1989 to 1992.

== Early life and career ==
Milošević was born in Požarevac, in what was then the People's Republic of Serbia in the Federal People's Republic of Yugoslavia. He holds a Ph.D and was director of the Naftagas engineering sector in the late 1980s.

== Politician ==
Milošević was appointed to the Executive Council of Vojvodina in December 1989 as secretary of science, technological development, and information technology.

In January 1991, he presented the Order of Labour with Golden Wreath to Dr. Miodrag Tekić, the dean of the Faculty of Technology in Novi Sad.

He requested to be relieved of his executive council duties in March 1992, and his last day in office was 31 March.
