= Dušan Salatić =

Serbian professor and writer

Dušan Salatić (born 3 March 1929) is a Serbian professor and writer. He was born in Nova Crvenka, Kingdom of Yugoslavia (now Serbia). He was the party leader of the now defunct Savez Srba Vojvodine.
