= Gordana Matković =

Serbian politician

- Гордана Матковић
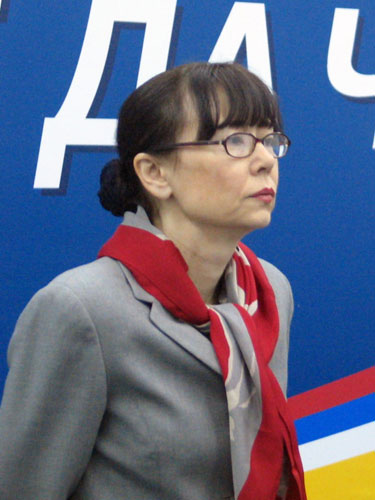

General Adviser of the President of Serbia
- In office 11 July 2004 – 5 April 2012
- President: Boris Tadić

Minister of Social Affairs
- In office 24 October 2000 – 3 March 2004
- Prime Minister: Zoran Đinđić; Zoran Živković
- Preceded by: Tomislav Milenković
- Succeeded by: Slobodan Lalović

Personal details
- Born: 15 March 1960 (age 66) Belgrade, FPR Yugoslavia
- Party: Democratic Party
- Education: University of Belgrade

Gordana Matković (Serbian Cyrillic: Гордана Матковић; born 15 March 1960) is a Serbian politician. She served as general adviser of the former president of Serbia Boris Tadić from 2004 to 2012. Previously, she served as the minister of social affairs in the Government of Serbia from 2000 to 2004.

== Career ==
She is the director of the Social Policy Studies Department in Center for Liberal-democratic studies, and her professional interest covers different fields such as social insurance and social policy, demography, labor economics and human development. She works as a consultant for the World Bank, UNDP and UNICEF. She is a visiting professor at the University of Belgrade Faculty of Economics.

From 2000 to 2004, she was the minister of social affairs in the Government of Serbia under Zoran Đinđić. From 2004 to 2012, she was the general adviser of the president of Serbia Boris Tadić.

In 2004, Matković received the "Konstantnin Obradović" award in the area of human rights promotion, and in 2005 she won the annual Women in Business and Government award given by the Erste Bank and the European Bank for Reconstruction and Development.

Government offices
| Preceded by Tomislav Milenković | Minister of Social Affairs; 2000–2004 | Succeeded by Slobodan Lalović |
