= Nova Crvenka =

Nova Crvenka Нова Црвенка (Serbian) Újcservenka (Hungarian) Нова Црвенка (Pannonian Rusyn)
- Village (Selo)
- Location within Vojvodina Location within Serbia Location within Europe
- Coordinates: 45°42′N 19°29′E
- Country: Serbia
- Province: Vojvodina
- Region: Bačka
- District: West Bačka
- Municipality: Kula

Population (2011)
  - Total: 420
- Time zone: UTC+1 (CET)
  - Summer (DST): UTC+2 (CEST)

Nova Crvenka (Serbian Cyrillic: Нова Црвенка) is a village in Serbia. It is situated in the Kula municipality, in the West Bačka District, Vojvodina province. The village has a Serb ethnic majority and its population numbering 420 people (2011 census).

== Historical population ==
Change of population number in Nova Crvenka

- 1921: 117̽̽
- 1931: 551̽̽
- 1948: 515
- 1953: 461
- 1961: 592
- 1971: 419
- 1981: 453
- 1991: 508
- 2002: 524
- 2011: 420
- 2022: 313

̽̽Nova Crvenka was at the time listed as a part of ethnically German populated Crvenka, estimation is based on number of Orthodox Christians in overall Crvenka population

== People ==
- Dušan Salatić (born 1929), professor and writer.

== See also ==
- List of places in Serbia
- List of cities, towns and villages in Vojvodina
