= Confederation of Autonomous Trade Unions of Serbia =

- Savez Samostalnih Sindikata Srbije
- Founded: 1903
- Location: Serbia
- Members: 505,111 (2017)
- Affiliations: ETUC, ITUC

The Confederation of Autonomous Trade Unions of Serbia (CATUS) (Serbian: Savez Samostalnih Sindikata Srbije SSSS) is the largest trade union confederation in Serbia with 28 affiliated unions in industry and the public sector.
