= Lipar =

Lipar Липар (Serbian)
- Village (Selo)
- Location within Vojvodina Location within Serbia Location within Europe
- Coordinates: 45°36′53″N 19°21′52″E
- Country: Serbia
- Province: Vojvodina
- Region: Bačka
- District: West Bačka
- Municipality: Kula

Population (2011)
  - Total: 1,482
- Time zone: UTC+1 (CET)
  - Summer (DST): UTC+2 (CEST)

Lipar (Serbian Cyrillic: Липар) is a village in the Kula municipality, in the West Bačka District, Vojvodina province, Serbia. The village has a Serb ethnic majority and its population numbering 1,482 people (2011 census).

== Historical population ==
- 1961: 1,890
- 1971: 1,609
- 1981: 1,506
- 1991: 1,456
- 2002: 1,807
- 2011: 1,482
