= Slobodan Lalović =

Serbian politician (1954–2023)

Slobodan Lalović Слободан Лаловић
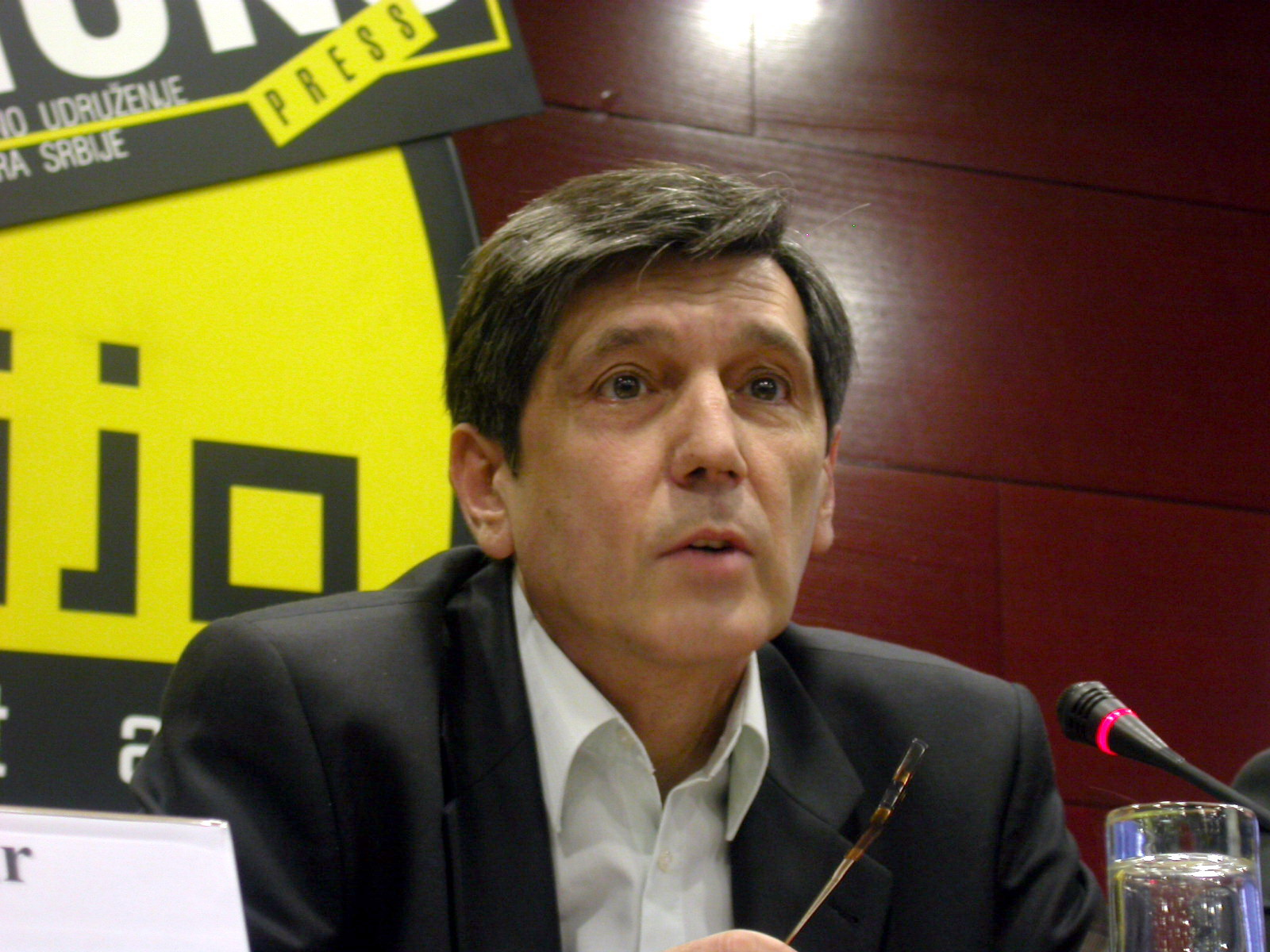

Minister of Labour, Employment and Social Policy
- In office 3 March 2004 – 15 May 2007
- Preceded by: Dragan Milovanović (Labour and Employment); Gordana Matković (Social Affaires)
- Succeeded by: Rasim Ljajić

Personal details
- Born: 25 December 1954 Belgrade, SR Serbia, FPR Yugoslavia
- Died: 16 April 2023 (aged 68)
- Party: Social Democratic Party
- Children: Four

Slobodan Lalović (Serbian Cyrillic: Слободан Лаловић; 25 December 1954 – 16 April 2023) was a Serbian politician who was Minister of Labour, Employment, and Social Policy, the position he served from 2004 to 2007.

== Life and career ==
Lalović was born on 25 December 1954. In 1978 he graduated from the University of Belgrade's Law School. He was a member of the Social Democratic Party.

Previously, Lalović was the secretary of a committee for investigating economic fraud. In 2002, he resigned, citing the committee's inefficiency. He also served as a deputy in the Belgrade City Assembly and in the Serbian parliament. He was married and had four children.

Lalović died on 16 April 2023, at the age of 68.

Government offices
Preceded by Dragan Milovanović (Labour and Employment); Gordana Matković (Social Affaires)	Minister of Labour, Employment and Social Policy; 2004–2007	Succeeded by Rasim Ljajić
