= Preokret =

Preokret! Преокрет!
- Leader: Čedomir Jovanović
- Founded: 5 November 2011
- Dissolved: 2013
- Ideology: Liberalism; Pro-Europeanism; Atlanticism
- Political position: Centre (majority)
- Colours: Purple; Red
- National Assembly (2012 election): 19 / 250

Website
- www.ldp.rs/vesti/preokret! (archived)

Preokret! (Serbian: Преокрет!; lit. 'U-Turn', 'Turnover', or 'Reversal') was a liberal and Pro-European political coalition in Serbia that participated in the 2012 parliamentary election. The coalition was headed by Čedomir Jovanović, the President of the LDP.

Political parties that were parts of this coalition were: Liberal Democratic Party, Serbian Renewal Movement, Social Democratic Union, Rich Serbia, Vojvodina's Party, Democratic Party of Sandžak, Green Ecological Party – The Greens, and Party of Bulgarians of Serbia.

This coalition was formed with a goal to accelerate the integration of Serbia into EU and to form good relations with the Western powers.

== History ==
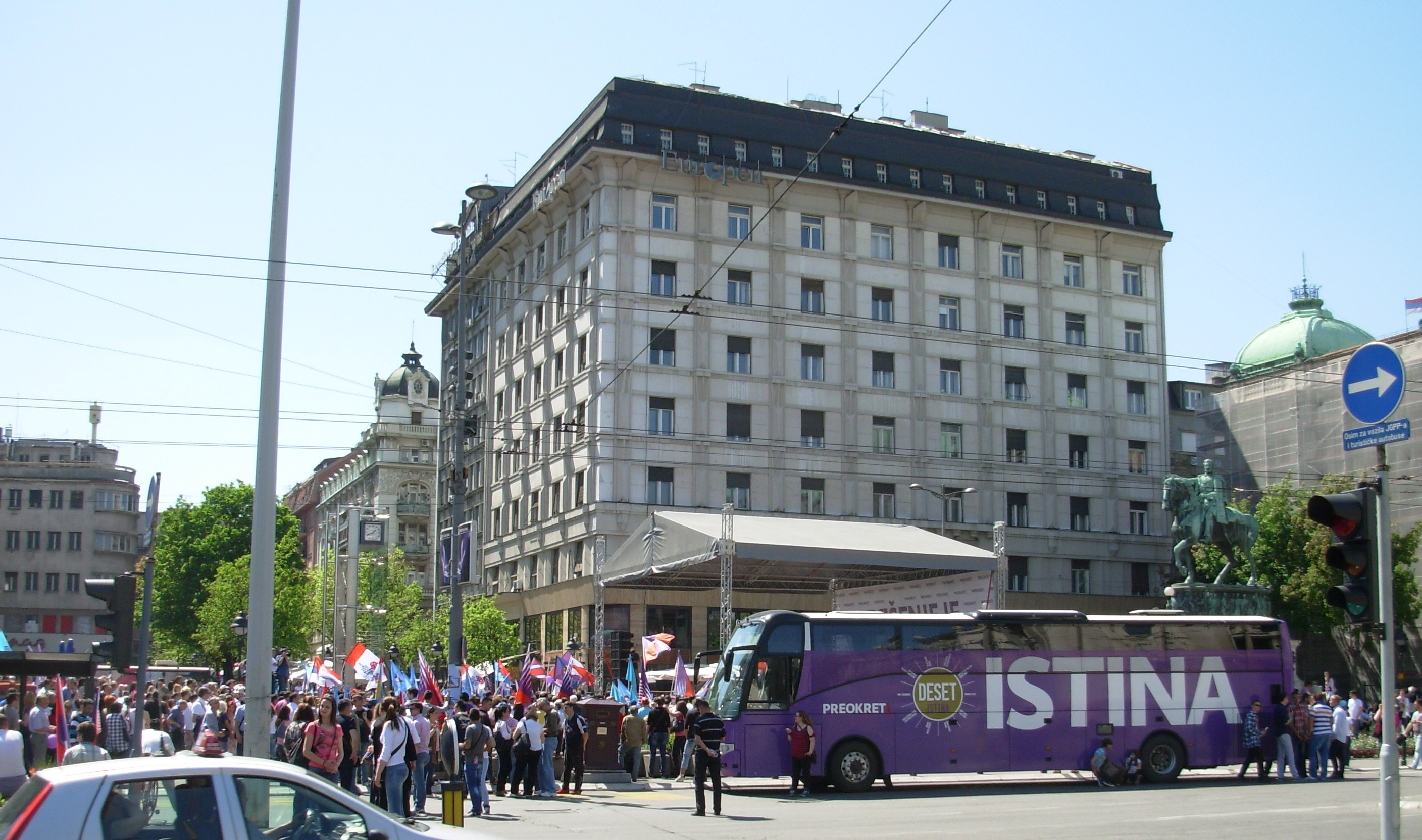
Election campaign - 2012 Serbian elections

=== The foundation ===
On the 5 November 2011, the proclamation "Turnover - Serbia into Europe, Europe into Serbia" was released to the public and was signed by the Liberal Democratic Party, Serbian Renewal Movement, and the Social Democratic Union as well as a number of intellectuals, and later joined by some regional and minority parties and non-governmental organizations.

=== Coalition demands ===
The proclamation states that they want to change the state policy towards Kosovo since the coalition claims that it has not been under Serbia's sovereignty since 1999. The proclamation also states that the goal of the signatories is to "united all those who are for Serbia in Europe" and criticizes the Government of Serbia and its, as stated, "indulgence in anti-European hysteria". After the presentation of the proclamation, the leader of the Liberal Democratic Party, Čedomir Jovanović, sent invitations to the patriarch, the President of Serbia, Boris Tadić and the President of SANU to sign it. Serbian President Boris Tadić said on the same day that he would not sign the proclamation because he "essentially disagrees with the policy of giving up legitimate state and national interests". The Liberal Democratic Party announced on 8 and 13 November 2011 that the proclamation had been signed by a large number of professors, directors, writers, musicians, and representatives of the non-governmental sector.

=== Pre-election formation ===
At a press conference held 11 March 2012, Čedomir Jovanović announced a pre-election coalition with the SPO, SDU, ASNS, Rich Serbia and some regional parties. The joint electoral list will be called "Preokret!" and its ballot holder will be Čedomir Jovanović. The coalition was de facto dissolved in 2013.

== Members ==
Name	Leader	Ideology	Political position	MPs (2012 election)	Change
Liberal Democratic Party; Либерално демократска странка Liberalno demokratska stranka	Čedomir Jovanović	Liberalism; Atlanticism; Anti-nationalism	Centre	13 / 250	▲1
Serbian Renewal Movement; Српски покрет обнове Srpski pokret obnove	Vuk Drašković	National liberalism Monarchism; Atlanticism	Centre-right	4 / 250	Steady
Social Democratic Union; Социјалдемократска унија Socijaldemokratska unija	Žarko Korać	Social democracy Pro-Europeanism; Anti-fascism	Centre-left	1 / 250	Steady
Rich Serbia; Богата Србија; Bogata Srbija	Zaharije Trnavčević	Green politics Social democracy Pro-Europeanism	Centre-left	1 / 250	▲1

== Results ==
Election year	Popular vote	% of popular vote	# of seats	Seat change	Status	Ballot carrier
2012	255,546	6.53%	19 / 250	▲2	opposition	Čedomir Jovanović
