= Liberal Democratic Party (Serbia) =

Political party in Serbia

Liberal Democratic Party Либерално демократска партија Liberalno demokratska partija
- Abbreviation: LDP
- Leader: Čedomir Jovanović
- Founders: Čedomir Jovanović; Nenad Prokić; Branislav Lečić
- Founded: 5 November 2005; 20 years ago
- Split from: Democratic Party
- Headquarters: Belgrade
- Ideology: Liberalism; Classical liberalism; Progressivism
- Political position: Centre
- Regional affiliation: Liberal South East European Network
- European affiliation: European Liberal Democrat and Reform Party (formerly)
- International affiliation: Liberal International (formerly)
- Colours: Purple
- National Assembly: 0 / 250
- Assembly of Vojvodina: 0 / 120
- City Assembly of Belgrade: 0 / 110

Website
- ldp.org.rs (archived)

The Liberal Democratic Party (Serbian: Либерално демократска партија, romanised: Liberalno demokratska partija, abbr. LDP) is a liberal political party in Serbia. It is led by Čedomir Jovanović.

== History ==
The Liberal Democratic Party was founded on 5 November 2005 by former members of the Democratic Party, led by Čedomir Jovanović, who were expelled in a party purge in 2004. Jovanović had become critical of the new direction of the Democratic Party and its newly elected president, Boris Tadić. The LDP gained its first seat in parliament after Đorđe Đukić defected from the Democratic Party. Members of the foundation board were: Nenad Prokić, Nikola Samardžić, Branislav Lečić and Đorđe Đukić. in 2007 the Civic Alliance of Serbia merged into the LDP. The LDP had a long-standing relationship with the Social Democratic Union and League of Social Democrats of Vojvodina.

LDP's activity decreased following the 2018 Belgrade City Assembly election, mainly due to the size of the party's debt. As of November 2023, LDP is in debt of din. 201,323,626, approximately around 2 million euros.

== Ideology ==
LDP is a liberal party, and it is supportive of secularism and multiculturalism. It has been also described as progressive and social liberal. The LDP is one of the few political parties in Serbia to actively support Serbia's membership into NATO and the independence of Kosovo. The LDP is also highly supportive of LGBT rights in Serbia. Regarding the economy, it is classical-liberal, market-orientated, and supports privatisation, although it is also in favour of social welfare. Additionally, it economic beliefs been described as neoliberal, libertarian, and conservative-liberal.

Its political positions have been described as centrist, although its social policies are positioned on the left-wing, while it is economically oriented towards the right.

In the Parliamentary Assembly of the Council of Europe, LDP was associated with the Alliance of Liberals and Democrats for Europe.

== Presidents of the Liberal Democratic Party ==
#	President	Born-Died	Term start	Term end
1	Čedomir Jovanović	1971–	5 November 2005	Incumbent

== Electoral performance ==
The LDP's first electoral performance was during the 2007 Serbian parliamentary election, the LDP ran in a coalition together with the Civic Alliance of Serbia, the Social Democratic Union and the League of Social Democrats of Vojvodina which collectively received 5.31% of the popular vote. The Civic Alliance would later merge into the LDP the same year.

The next election followed a year later, with the LDP receiving only 5.24% of the popular vote, its worst performance to date.

The Liberal Democratic Party competed in the 2012 Serbian parliamentary election as part of the Preokret coalition. The coalition received 6.53% of the popular vote.

In the 2014 Serbian parliamentary elections, LDP participated in the coalition with the Social Democratic Union and the Bosniak Democratic Union of Sandžak. However, the coalition did not win any seats in the National Assembly as it only received 3.36% of the popular vote.

In the 2016 Serbian parliamentary elections, LDP participated in the coalition with the Social Democratic Party and the League of Social Democrats of Vojvodina. The coalition received 5.02% of the popular vote and gained 13 seats in the National Assembly with LDP receiving 4 seats.

In the 2020 Serbian parliamentary elections, LDP led a coalition called "Coalition for Peace" along with the Vlach National Party and other small Bosniak, Romani, Romanian, and Montenegrin political organisations. However, the coalition had the worst result in LDP's history and it failed to pass the 3% electoral threshold.

=== Parliamentary elections ===
National Assembly of Serbia
Year	Leader	Popular vote	% of popular vote	#	# of seats	Seat change	Coalition	Status	Ref.
2007	Čedomir Jovanović	214,262	5.40%	▲6th	6 / 250	▲6	LDP–GSS−SDU−LSV−DHSS	Opposition	
2008	Čedomir Jovanović	216,902	5.35%	▲5th	11 / 250	▲5	LDP–DHSS−SDU	Opposition	
2012	Čedomir Jovanović	255,546	6.83%	5th	13 / 250	▲2	Preokret	Opposition	
2014	Čedomir Jovanović	120,879	3.48%	▼7th	0 / 250	▼13	LDP–SDU−BDZS	Extra-parliamentary	
2016	Čedomir Jovanović	189,564	5.17%	7th	4 / 250	▲4	LDP–SDS−LSV	Opposition	
2020	Čedomir Jovanović	10,158	0.33%	▼18th	0 / 250	▼4	KZM	Extra-parliamentary	
2022	Čedomir Jovanović	Did not participate			0 / 250	0	–	Extra-parliamentary	
2023	Čedomir Jovanović	9,243	0.25%	▲15th	0 / 250	0	–	Extra-parliamentary	
2026	Čedomir Jovanović	Did not participate			0 / 250	0	–	Extra-parliamentary	

=== Presidential elections ===
President of Serbia
Election year	#	Candidate	1st round vote	% of vote	2nd round vote	% of vote	Notes
2008	▲5th	Čedomir Jovanović	219,689	5.34%	—	—	
2012	▼6th	Čedomir Jovanović	196,668	5.03%	—	—	Preokret

== See also ==
- Liberalism in Serbia
