= Kula, Serbia =

Kula Кула (Serbian) Kúla (Hungarian) Кула (Pannonian Rusyn)
- Town and municipality
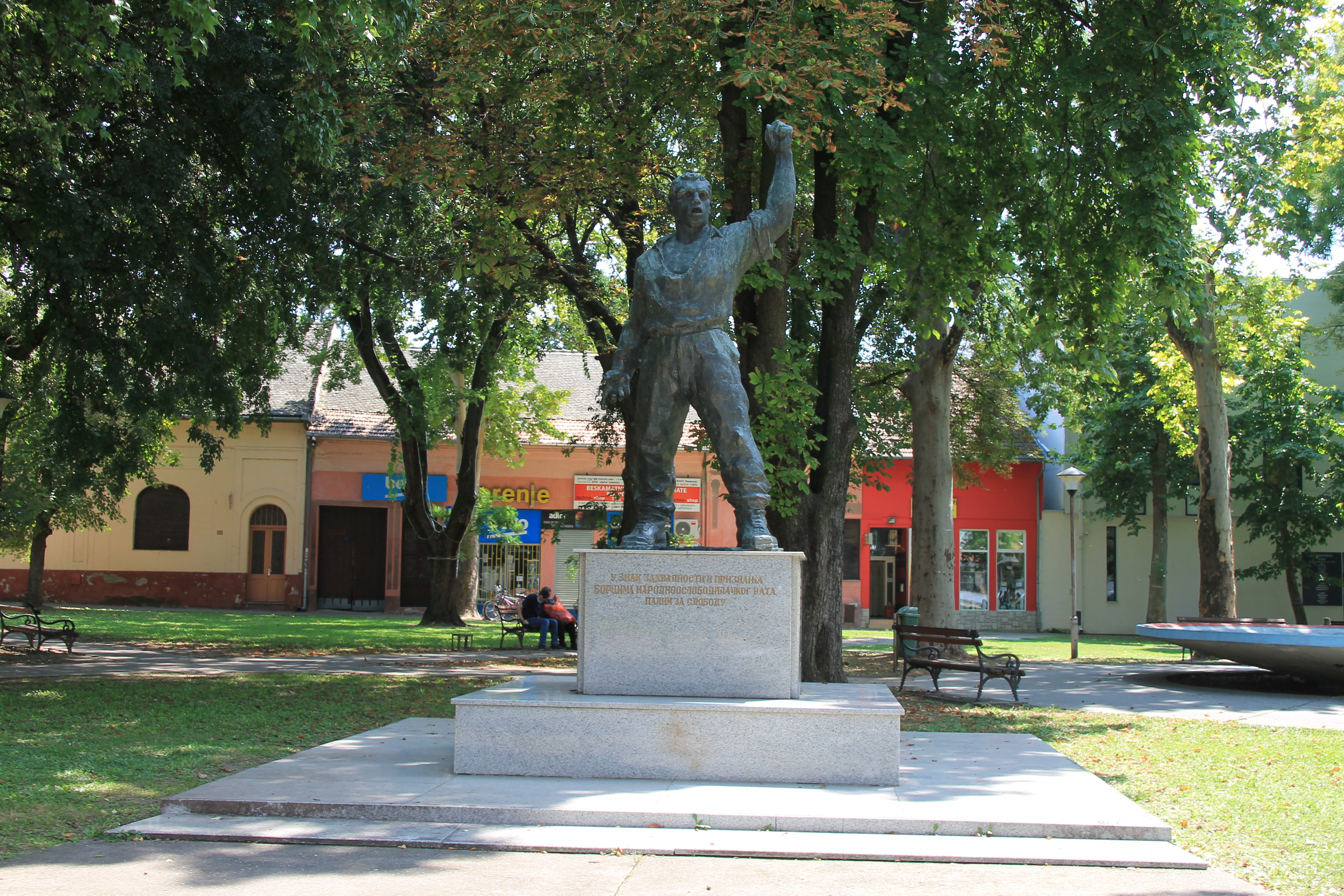
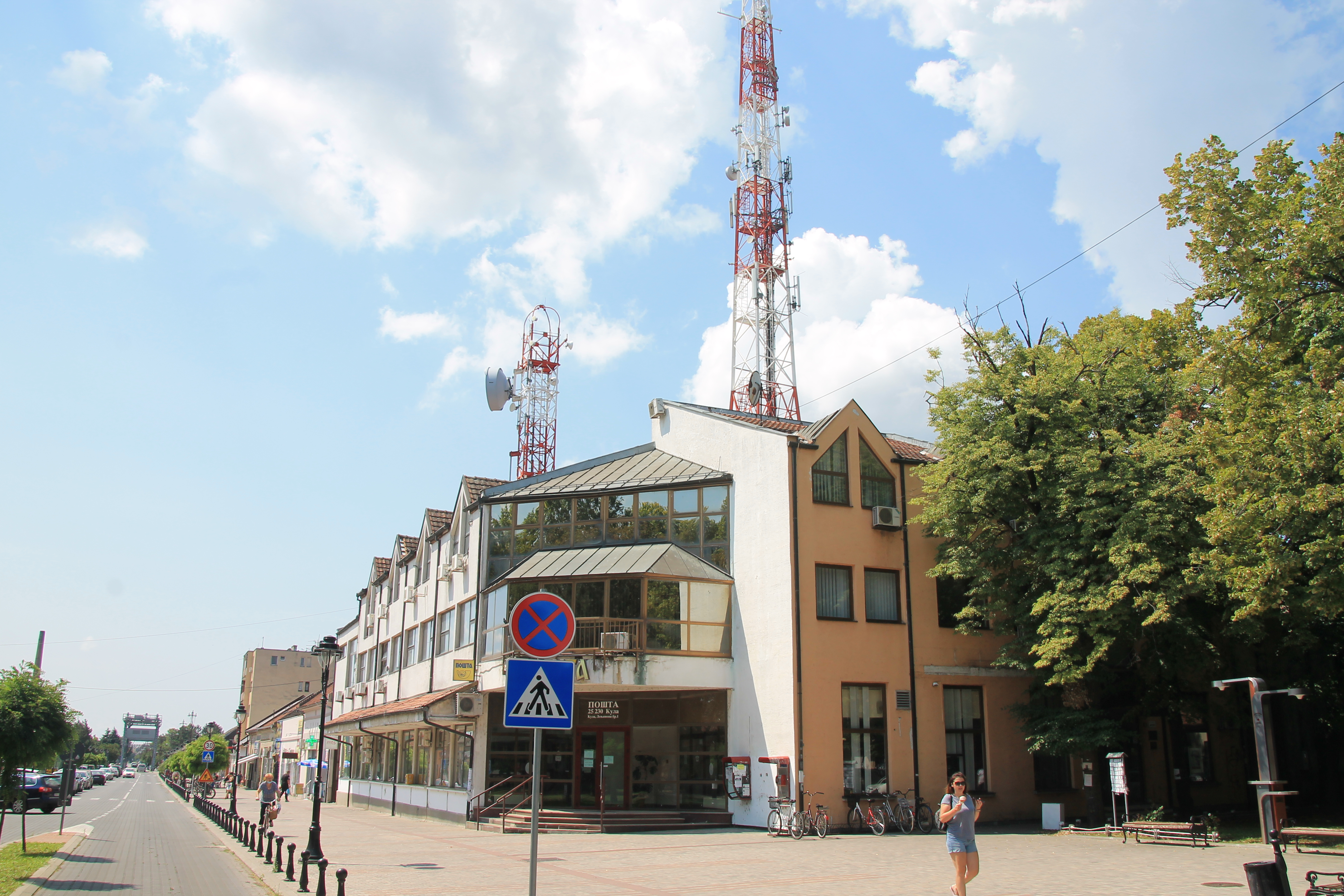
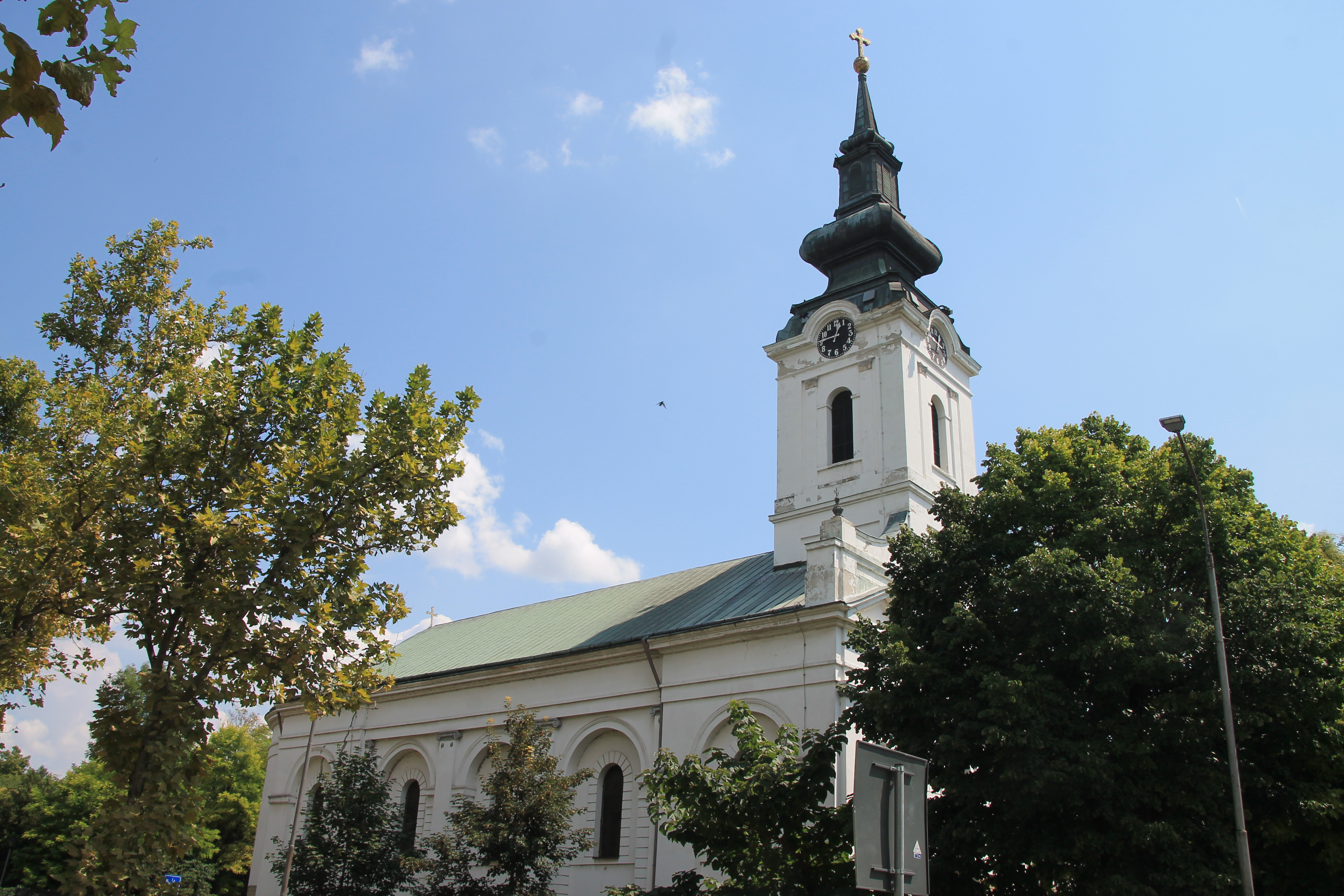
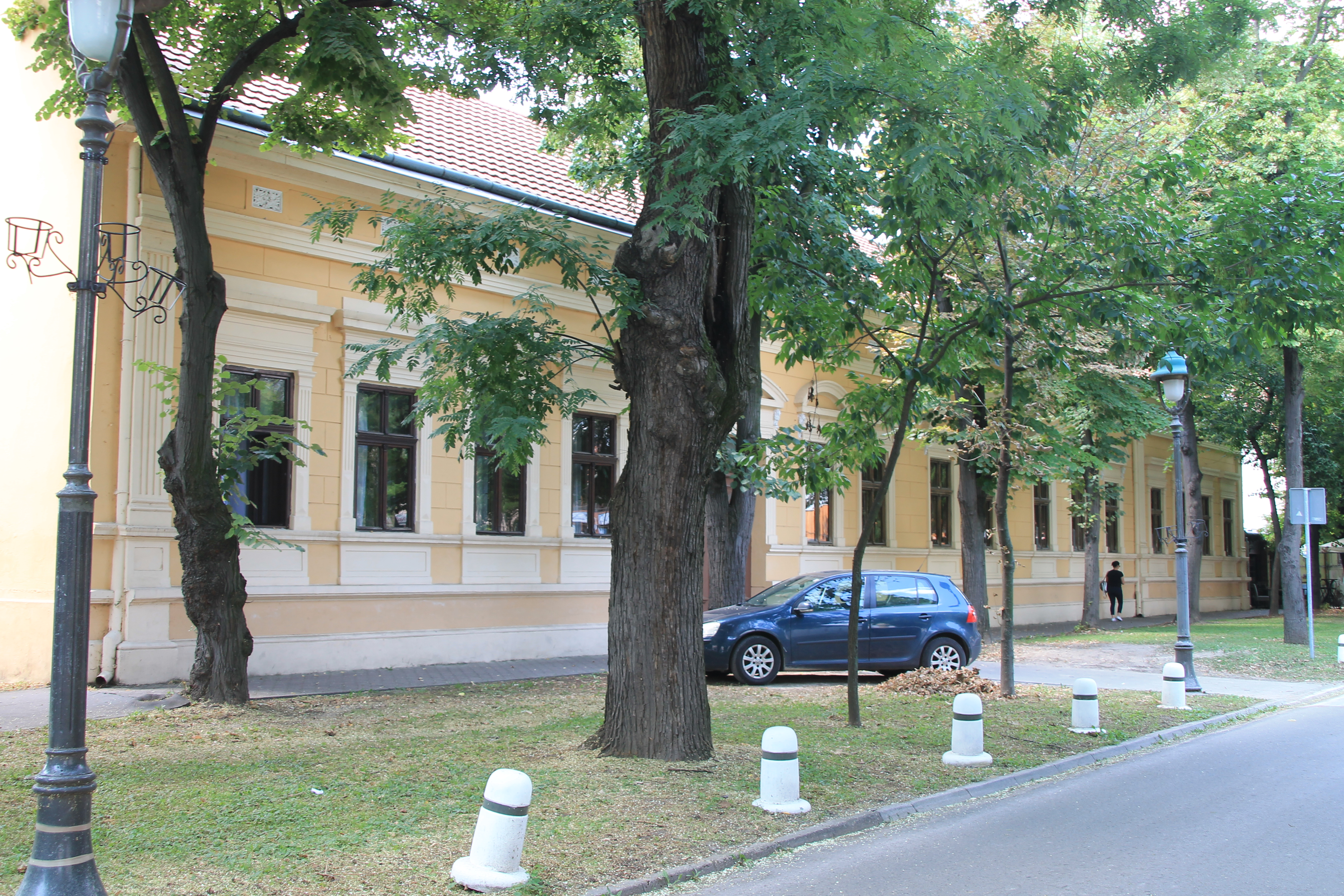
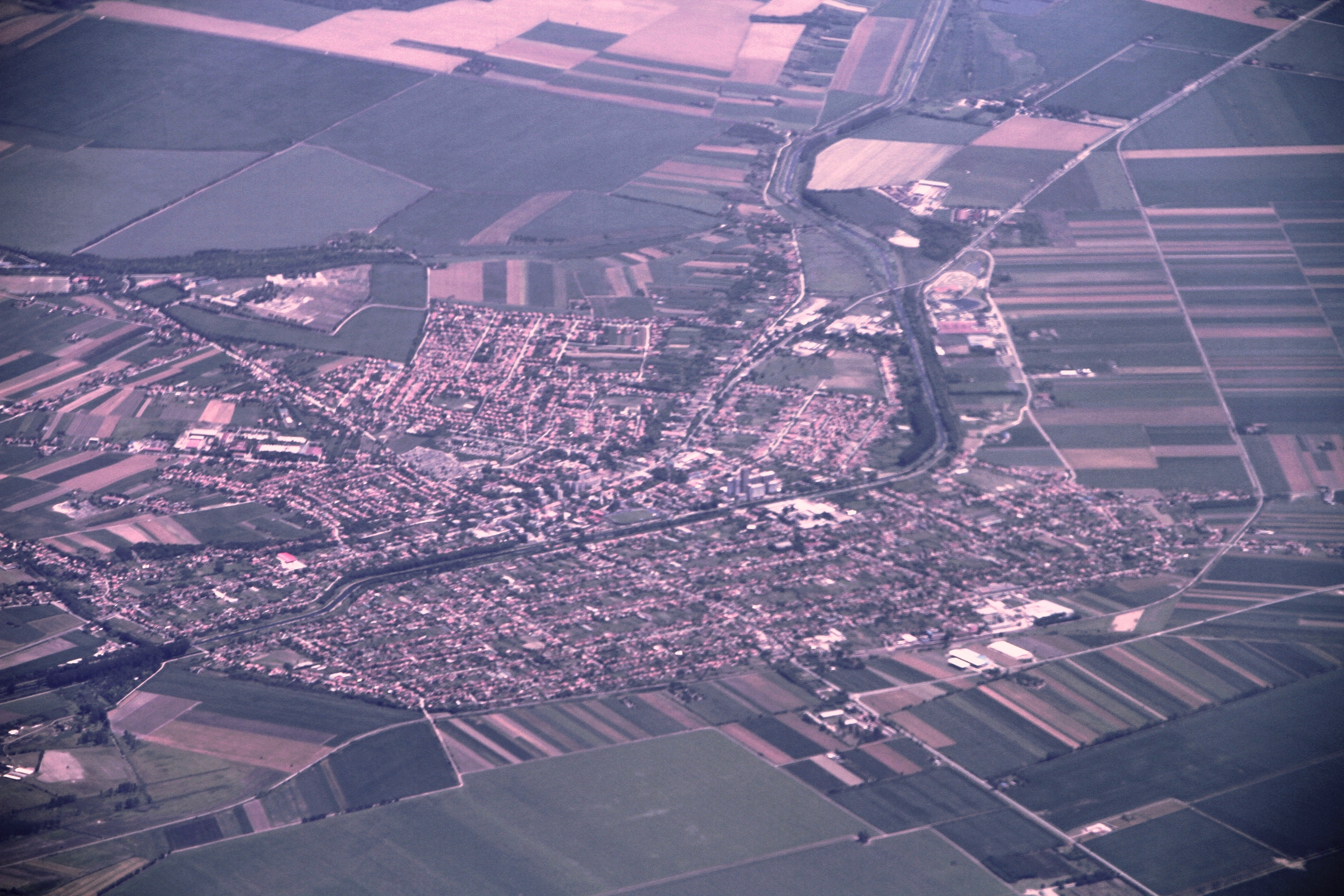
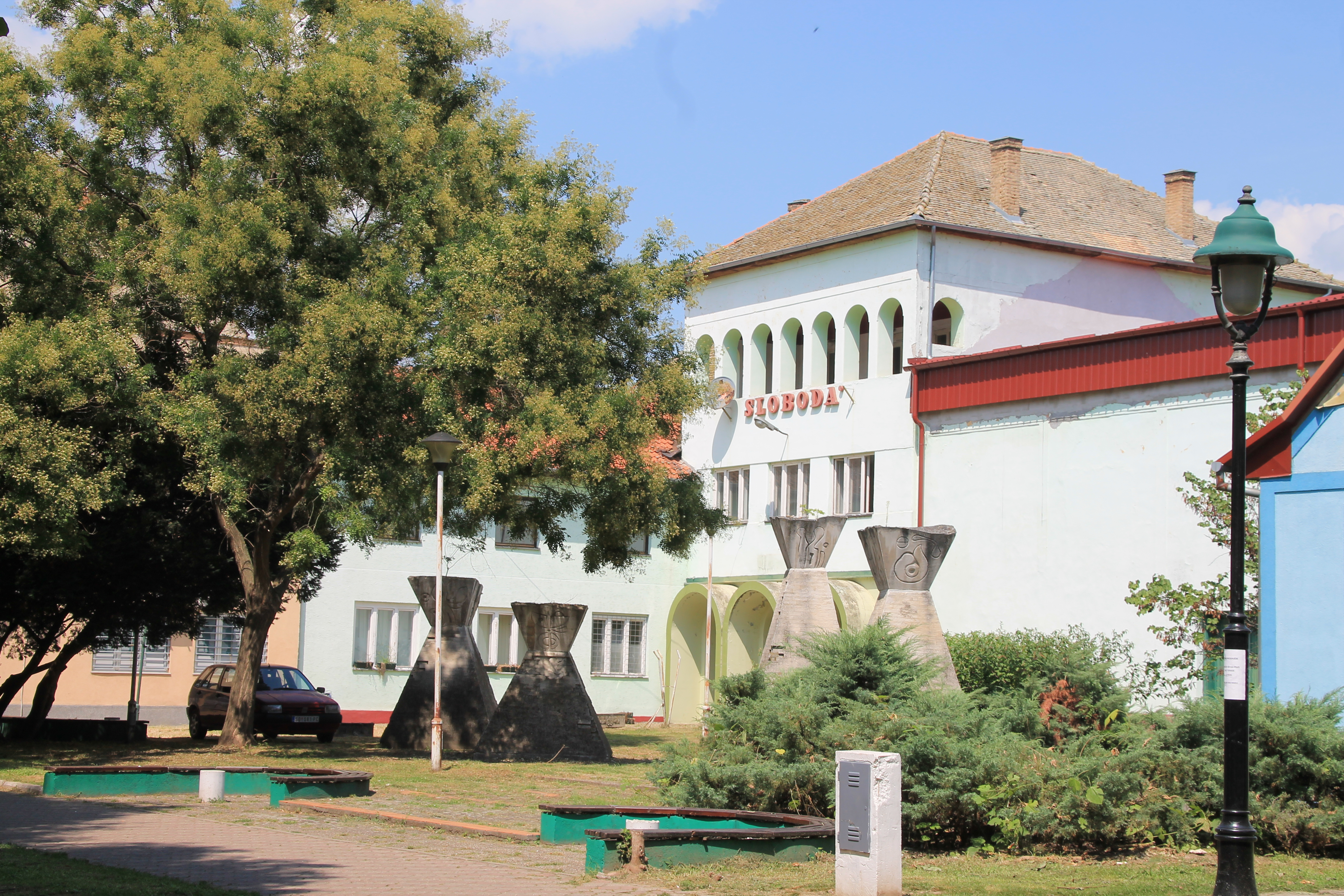
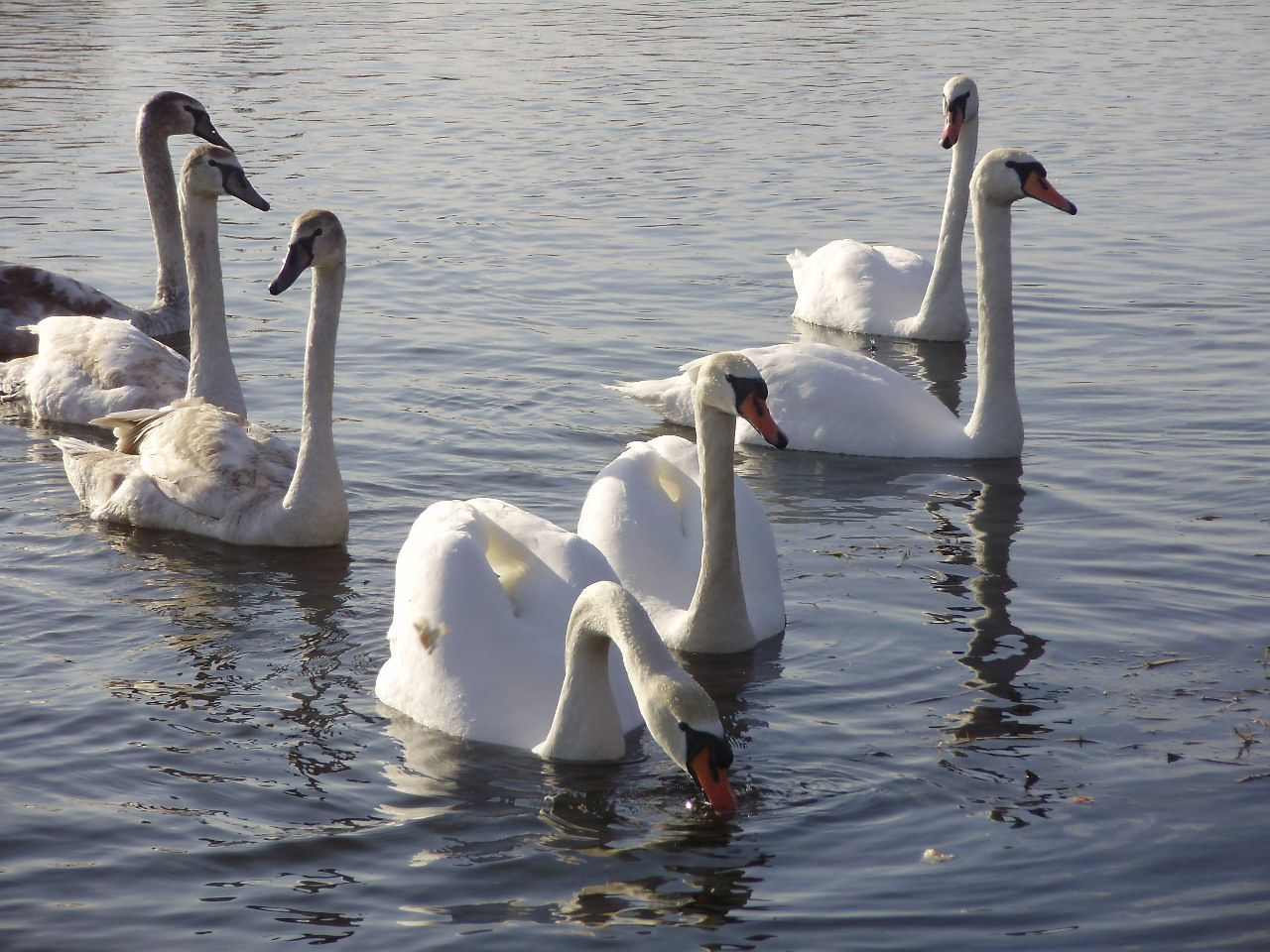
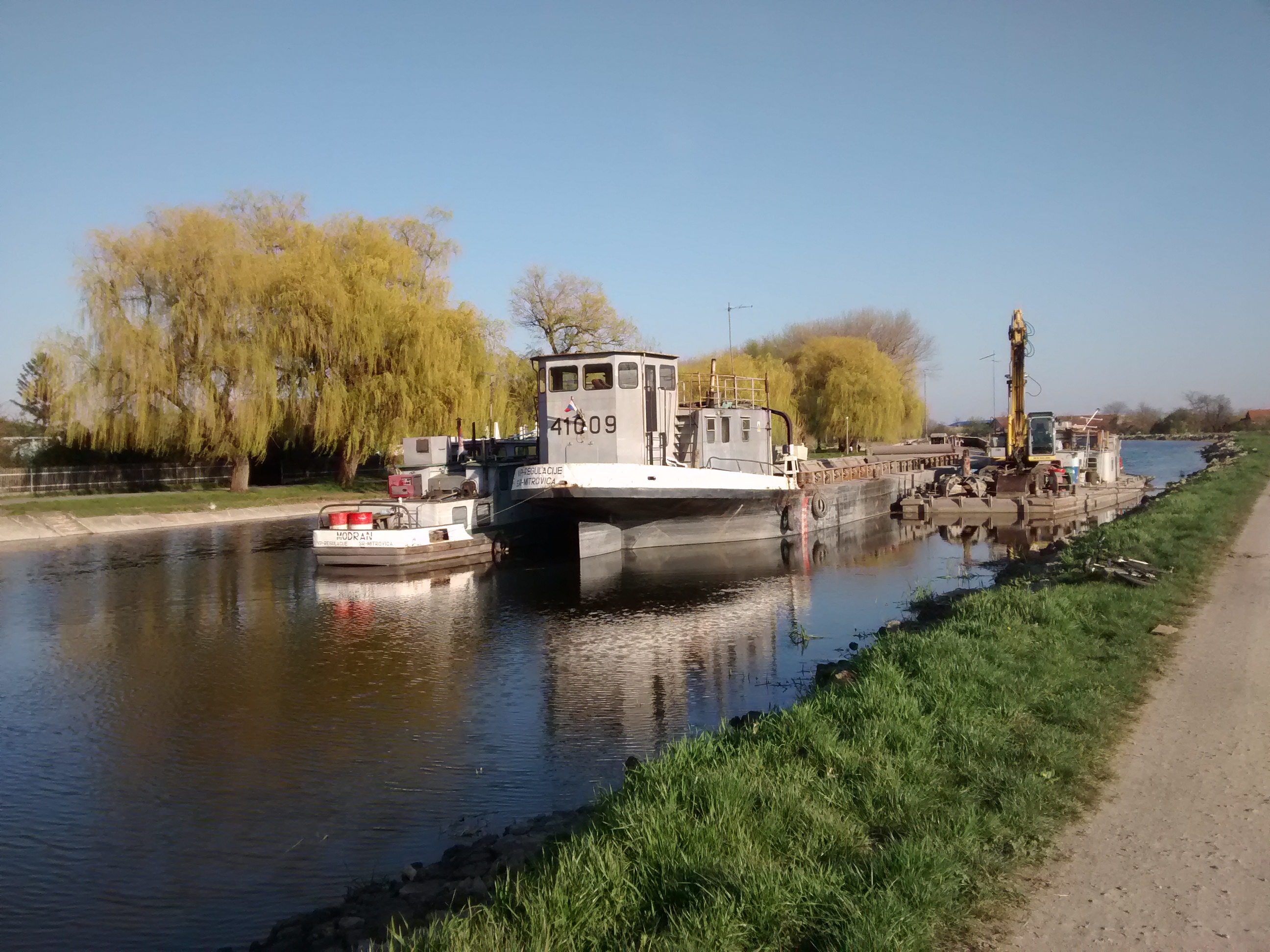
- Kula

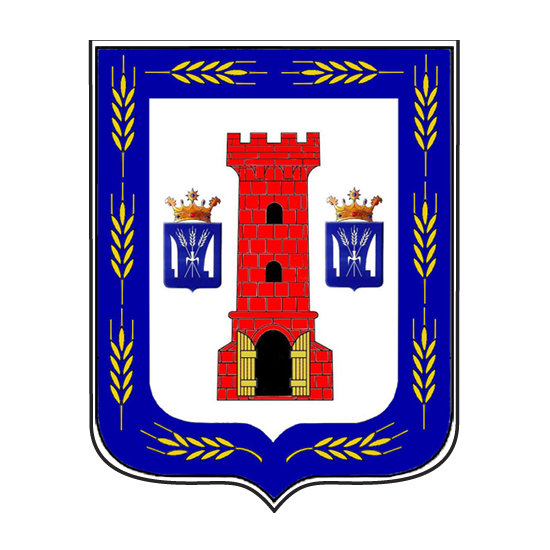
- Coat of arms

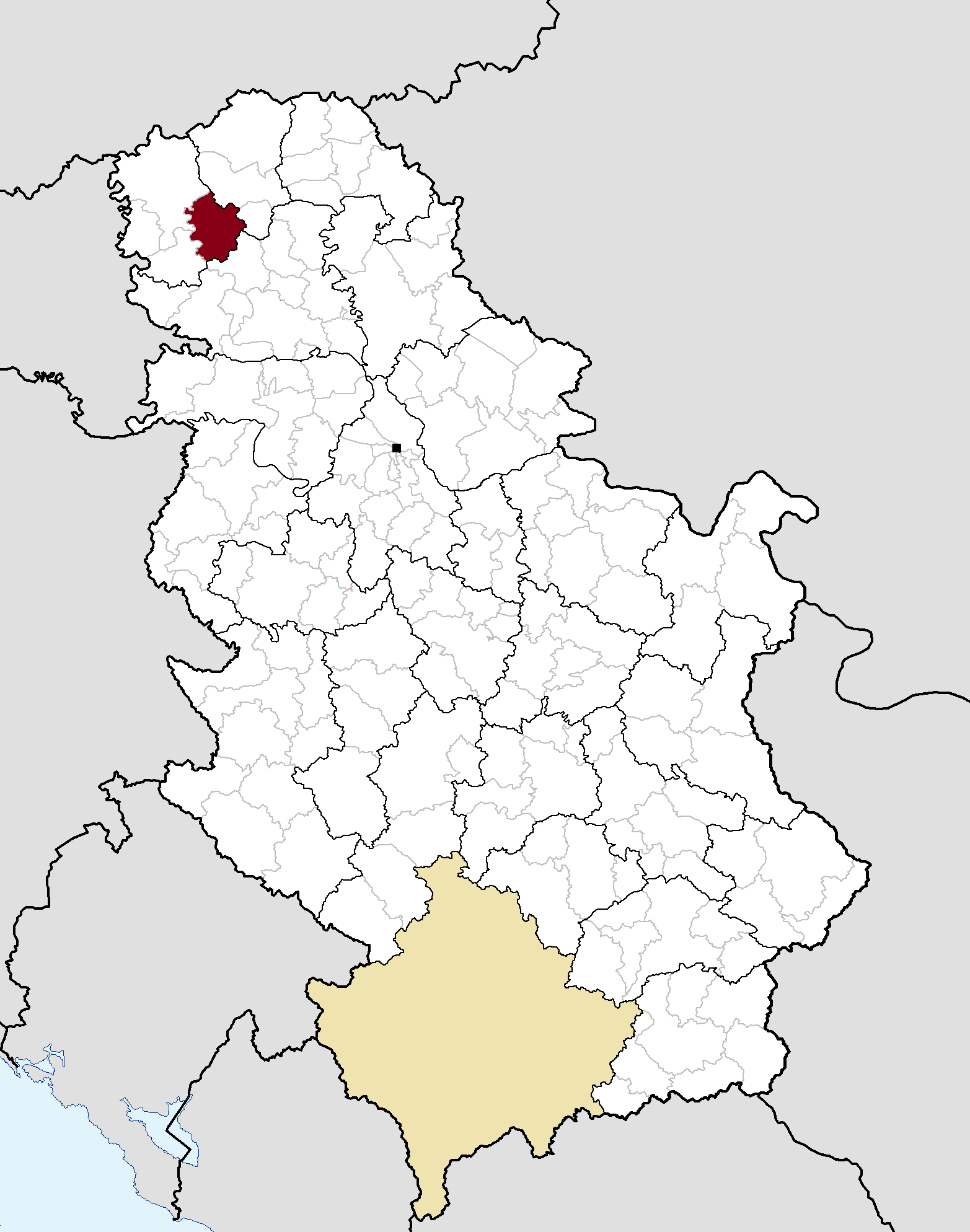
- Location of the municipality of Kula within Serbia
- Coordinates: 45°36′42″N 19°31′45″E
- Country: Serbia
- Province: Vojvodina
- Region: Bačka
- District: West Bačka
- Municipality: Kula
- Settlements: 7

Government
  - Mayor: Damjan Miljanić (SNS)

Area
  - Municipality: 481 km^{2} (186 sq mi)
- Elevation: 88 m (289 ft)

Population (2022 census)
  - Town: 14,873
  - Municipality: 35,592
- Time zone: UTC+1 (CET)
  - Summer (DST): UTC+2 (CEST)
- Postal code: 25230
- Area code: +381 25
- Car plates: KU
- Official languages: Serbian together with Hungarian and Pannonian Rusyn
- Website: www.kula.rs

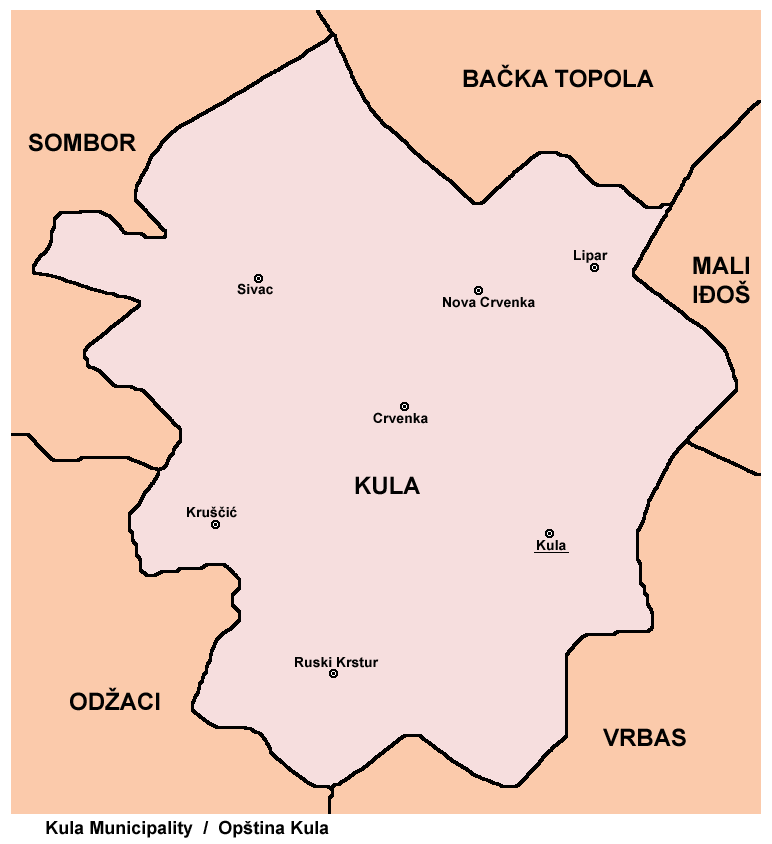
Map of Kula municipality

Kula (Serbian Cyrillic: Кула, Pannonian Rusyn: Кула, Hungarian: Kúla) is a town and municipality located in the West Bačka District of the autonomous province of Vojvodina, Serbia. The town has a population of 14,873, while the municipality has a population of 35,592.

== Name ==
In Serbian, the town is known as Kula (Кула); in Pannonian Rusyn as Кула, in Hungarian as Kúla, in Croatian as Kula, in German as Kula or Wolfsburg, and in Turkish as Kula (Ottoman script: قوله).

The name Kule means "tower" in Turkish and Serbian. In the 16th-17th century, a tower with military garrison existed at this location, hence the name of the town.

== History ==
In the middle of the 18th century, during Ottoman administration, two settlements with this name were mentioned - Gornja Kula and Donja Kula. These settlements were part of the Ottoman Sanjak of Segedin and were populated by ethnic Serbs. From the end of the 17th century, the region was under administration of the Habsburg monarchy and two settlements were mentioned as Mala Kula and Velika Kula and were unpopulated. In 1714, there was a record about a single settlement named Kula that had 14 houses. In 1733, the population of the settlement numbered 251 houses and its inhabitants were Serbs. Hungarians started to settle there in 1740 and Germans in 1780 to 1785.

Until the middle of the 19th century, the settlement was part of the Batsch-Bodrog County within the Habsburg Kingdom of Hungary. In 1848-1849 it was part of the autonomous Serbian Vojvodina and from 1849 to 1860, it was part of the Voivodeship of Serbia and Banat of Temeschwar, a separate Habsburg crownland. After the abolishment of the voivodeship in 1860, the settlement was again included into Batsch-Bodrog County. In the second half of the 19th century, some Rusyns were settled here as well.

After 1867, colonization of Hungarians was intensified, and until the beginning of the 20th century they replaced Serbs as largest ethnic group in Kula. According to the 1910 census, the population of Kula was ethnically mixed: from the total population of 9,119 there was 3,679 speakers of Hungarian, 2,510 speakers of Serbian, 2,425 speakers of German, and 456 speakers of Rusyn.

After 1918, the settlement was part of the Kingdom of Serbs, Croats and Slovenes (later renamed to Kingdom of Yugoslavia). In 1918–1919, it was part of the Banat, Bačka and Baranja region, and also (from 1918 to 1922) part of the Novi Sad County. From 1922 to 1929, it was part of the Bačka Oblast, and from 1929 to 1941 part of the Danube Banovina. During World War II, From 1941 to 1944, Kula was under Axis occupation and was attached to the Horthy's Hungary.

In 1944, the Soviet Red Army and Yugoslav partisans expelled Axis troops from the region and Kula was included into autonomous province of Vojvodina within new socialist Yugoslavia. Since 1945, Vojvodina is part of the People's Republic of Serbia within Yugoslavia.

According to 1953 census, Hungarians were the largest ethnic group in the town, while subsequent censuses recorded Serb ethnic plurality. The German community left Kula at the end of World War II, while a sizable number of Serb Montenegrins from Montenegro settled there instead of Germans. After the breakup of Yugoslavia (1991–1992) and Serbia and Montenegro (2006), the town became part of an independent Republic of Serbia. Today the Serbs are the largest ethnic group in the town.

== Inhabited places ==
The Kula municipality includes the towns of Kula and Crvenka, and also the following villages:

- Kruščić
- Lipar
- Nova Crvenka
- Ruski Krstur
- Sivac

== Demographics ==
Historical population
Year	Pop.	±% p.a.
1948	39,488	—
1953	41,622	+1.06%
1961	46,062	+1.28%
1971	48,727	+0.56%
1981	49,898	+0.24%
1991	49,311	−0.12%
2002	48,353	−0.18%
2011	43,101	−1.27%
2022	35,592	−1.73%

According to the 2022 census results, the municipality of Kula has 35,592 inhabitants.

=== Ethnic groups in the Kula municipality ===
The ethnic composition of the municipality:

Ethnic group	Population	%
Serbs	22,210	62.40%
Rusyns	3,595	10.10%
Hungarians	2,660	7.47%
Montenegrins	1,992	5.60%
Ukrainians	946	2.66%
Croats	369	1.04%
Roma	282	0.79%
Yugoslavs	138	0.39%
Macedonians	121	0.34%
Slovaks	115	0.32%
Others	3,164	8.89%
Total	35,592	

=== Settlements by ethnic majority ===
Settlements with a Serb ethnic majority are: Lipar, Nova Crvenka, Sivac, and Crvenka. The settlement with a Rusyn ethnic majority is Ruski Krstur. Ethnically mixed settlements are: Kula (with a relative Serb majority) and Kruščić (with a relative Montenegrin majority).

=== Ethnic groups in the Kula town ===
The town of Kula has a total of 14,873 inhabitants, including:

- Serbs (63.29%)
- Hungarians (9.98%)
- Montenegrins (9.51%)
- Ukrainians (3.99%)
- Rusyns (2.64%)
- Croats (1.39%)
- Others and undeclared (9.20%)

=== Languages in the Kula municipality ===
77% of the inhabitants of the Kula municipality declared Serbian as their mother language in a 2002 census.

== Economy ==
Kula is a home to prominent Serbian confectionary products manufacturer Jaffa Crvenka.

The following table gives a preview of total number of registered people employed in legal entities per their core activity (as of 2018):

Activity	Total
Agriculture, forestry and fishing	591
Mining and quarrying	-
Manufacturing	1,964
Electricity, gas, steam and air conditioning supply	21
Water supply; sewerage, waste management and remediation activities	241
Construction	207
Wholesale and retail trade, repair of motor vehicles and motorcycles	1,448
Transportation and storage	601
Accommodation and food services	238
Information and communication	59
Financial and insurance activities	92
Real estate activities	3
Professional, scientific and technical activities	202
Administrative and support service activities	221
Public administration and defense; compulsory social security	380
Education	751
Human health and social work activities	294
Arts, entertainment and recreation	85
Other service activities	164
Individual agricultural workers	349
Total	7,913

== Politics ==
There is an initiative among the inhabitants of Crvenka and Ruski Krstur that these two settlements become their own municipalities, completely separate from Kula.

== Sports ==
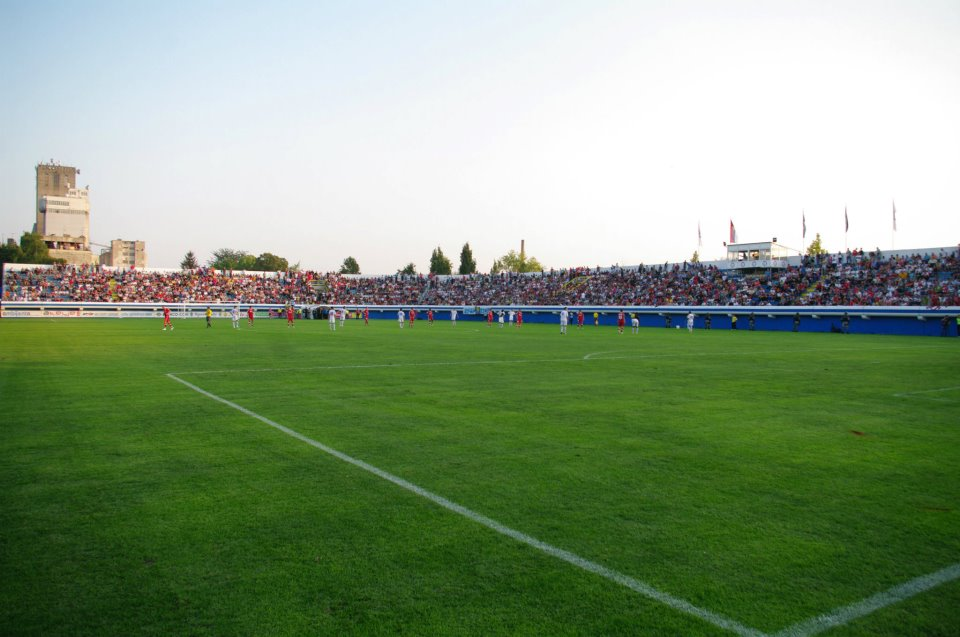
Stadion Hajduk

There is a football club named Hajduk Kula in the town.

== Notable people ==
- Isidor Bajić, composer, pedagogue and publisher
- Duško Grujić, footballer
- Dragan Škrbić, handball player
- Goran Gogić, footballer

== Twin towns – sister cities ==
Kula is twinned with:

- Bar, Montenegro
- Kalocsa, Hungary
- Kőbánya, Hungary

== See also ==
- Municipalities of Serbia
- List of places in Serbia
- West Bačka District

== Gallery ==
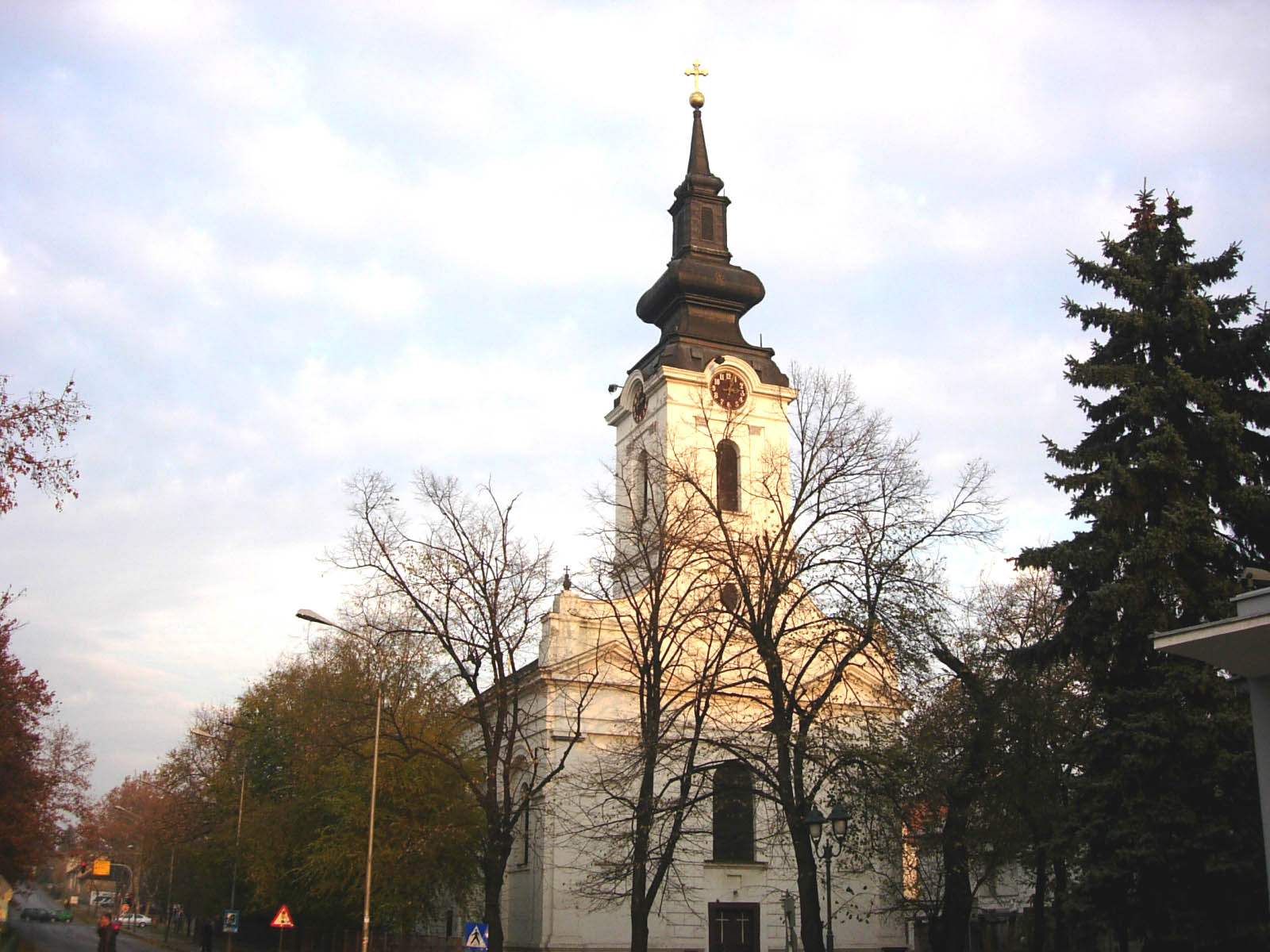
The Orthodox church.

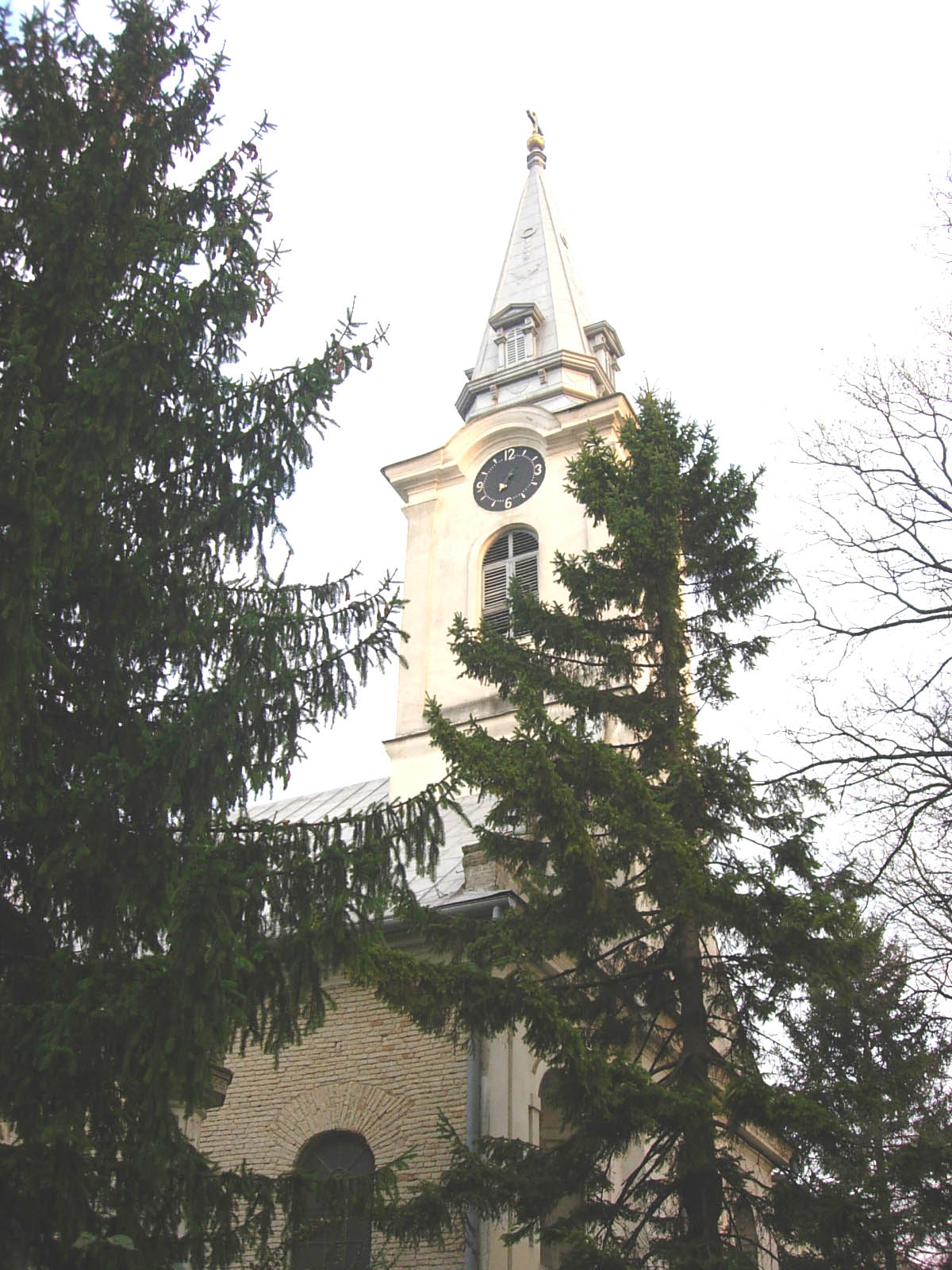
Saint George the Martyr Catholic Church.

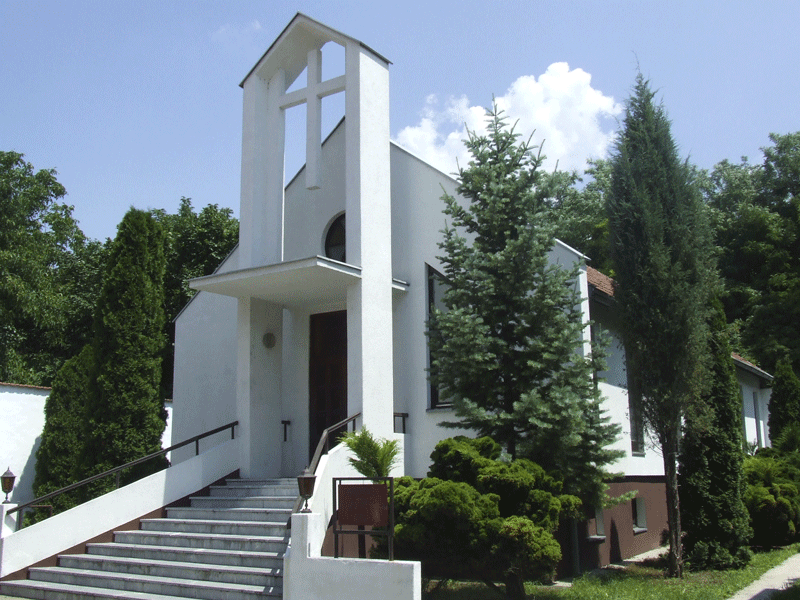
Seventh-day Adventist Church.

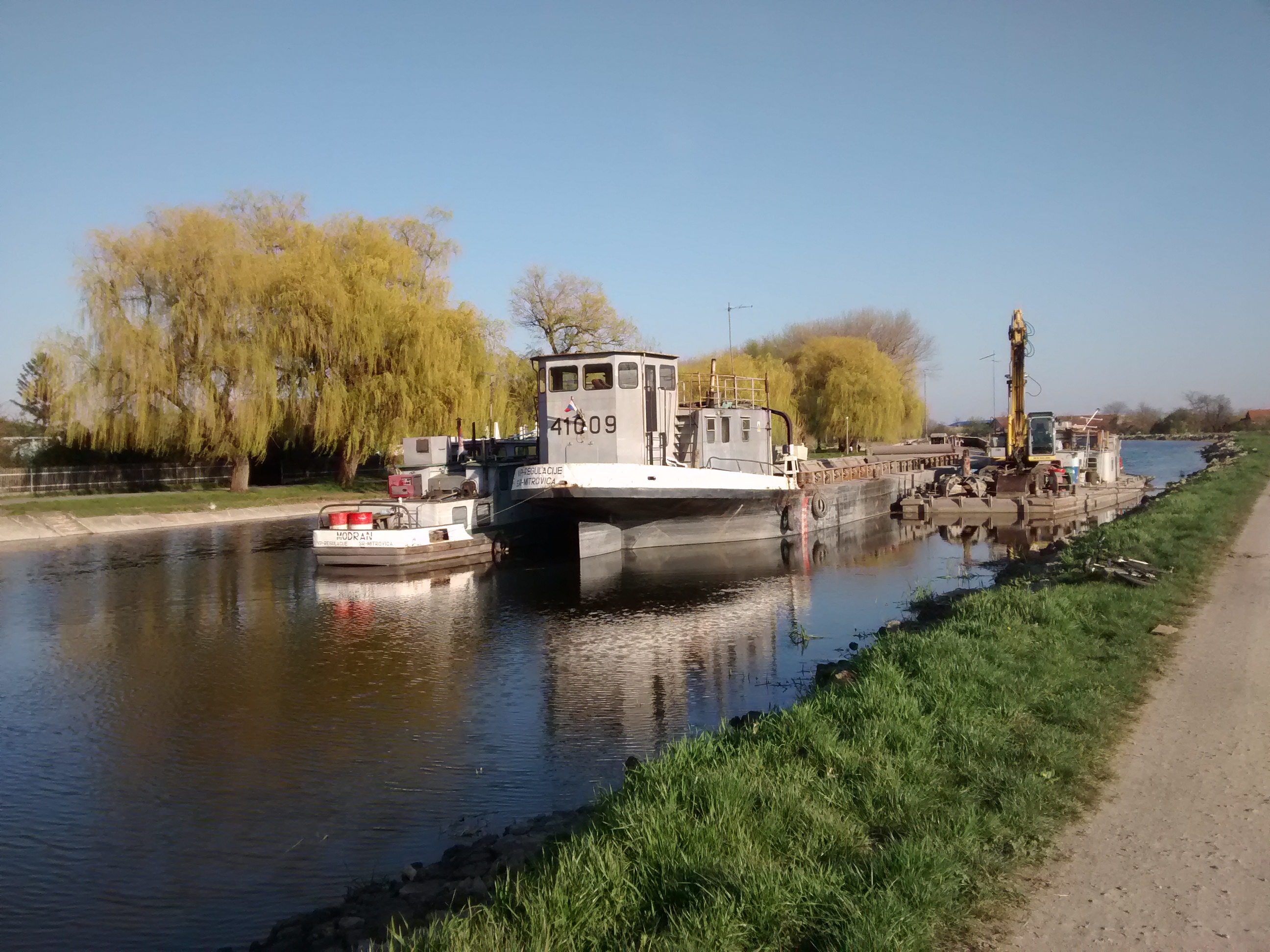
View of Canal in Kula
