= Petar Kuntić =

Serbian agricultural engineer (born 1960)

Petar Kuntić (Serbian Cyrillic: Петар Кунтић; born 19 June 1960) is a Serbian community leader and former politician from the country's Croat community. He led the Democratic Alliance of Croats in Vojvodina (DSHV) from 2003 to 2015 and was a member of the Serbian parliament from 2007 to 2014. He also served three terms on Serbia's Croatian National Council and was the deputy mayor of Subotica from 2005 to 2007.

Kuntić sought election to the Croatian parliament in the 2015 election as a candidate of the Croatian Democratic Union (HDZ) but was not successful.

== Early life and private career ==
Kuntić was born in Subotica, Autonomous Province of Vojvodina, in what was then the People's Republic of Serbia in the Federal People's Republic of Yugoslavia. He graduated from the University of Novi Sad Faculty of Agriculture in 1985 and took postgraduate studies at the same institution in 1986–87, although he left before completing his exams. He worked in Subotica from 1986 to 1992, was employed with Agroseme Panonija from 1992 to 1997, and oversaw a private farm from 1997 to 2000. He later worked for Fermopromet in Novi Bezdan, Croatia, from 2000 to 2002 and was the acting director of DP Palić from 2002 to 2005.

== Politician ==
=== Early years (1993–2003) ===
Kuntić joined the DSHV in 1993. He was elected to its presidency in 1994 and was its vice-president from 1996 to 2003.

He was the DSHV's candidate for Subotica's fourth electoral district in the 1996 Vojvodina provincial election. He was not successful; the winning candidate was Ivan Vojnić Tunić of the Socialist Party of Serbia (SPS). He also ran for Ker's second division in the concurrent election for Subotica's municipal assembly in the 1996 Serbian local elections and lost to Blaško Gabrić, the candidate of Mirko Bajić's Subotica Civic Alliance. Kuntić later appeared in the second position on the DSHV's electoral list for the Subotica division in the 1997 Serbian parliamentary election; the list did not win any mandates.

Serbia's electoral laws were reformed after the fall of Slobodan Milošević in October 2000. For parliamentary elections, the entire country became a single electoral district and all mandates were distributed to candidates on successful lists at the discretion of the sponsoring parties or coalitions, irrespective of numerical order. The DSHV did not participate in the 2000 Serbian parliamentary election.

The Federal Republic of Yugoslavia oversaw the first elections for the Croatian National Council in 2002. Kuntić appeared in the sixth position on the DSHV's electoral list and was elected when the list won fifteen mandates. A rival list, known as the Forum of Croatian Institutions and Organizations of Vojvodina, won twenty seats.

=== Party leader and deputy mayor (2003–07) ===
After a period of internal turmoil, the DSHV removed Bela Tonković as party leader on 6 July 2003 and appointed Kuntić as his successor on an interim basis.

The DSHV contested the 2003 Serbian parliamentary election as part of the Together for Tolerance (ZZT) alliance. Kuntić appeared in the 103rd position on its electoral list, which did not cross the electoral threshold for assembly representation.

In early 2004, Kuntić led the DSHV in merger discussions with the Croatian National Alliance (HNS), which had split off from the DSHV in 1998. The talks were successful, and the HNS merged back into the DSHV at a party conference held on 29 February 2004. Kuntić was formally elected as DSHV president on the same occasion, defeating Blaško Temunović. Temunović, in turn, left the DSHV later in the year to launch his own breakaway party, the Croatian Bunjevac-Šokac Party (HBŠS).

Kuntić ran for Subotica's second division in the 2004 Vojvodina provincial election and was defeated by Mirko Bajić in the second round of voting. He also appeared in the second position on the DSHV's list for Subotica in the concurrent 2004 local elections and was elected when the list won five seats. He was chosen as deputy mayor of the municipality on 26 January 2005, with his term formally beginning the following day. Kuntić was required to resign from the assembly by virtue of holding this executive role, which he did on 1 February.

Relations between Subotica's Croat and Bunjevac communities were extremely fraught in this period, as many Croat community leaders contend that Bunjevci are a sub-group of Croats and not a separate ethnicity. In 2006, Kuntić remarked that Bunjevci would "soon be a thing of the past" and cease to exist as a distinct community. This statement was condemned by Mirko Bajić, Subotica's most prominent Bunjevac politician.

At the time Kuntić became deputy mayor, the DSHV had been aligned with the Alliance of Vojvodina Hungarians (SMV) in Subotica for over a decade. The alliance broke down in 2007, and the DSHV formed a new partnership with the Democratic Party (DS), a frequent rival to the SMV at the local level. A group of DSHV members who opposed this decision formed another breakaway party called the Democratic Union of Croats (DZH).

=== Parliamentarian ===
Kuntić appeared in the 110th position on the Democratic Party's electoral list in the 2007 parliamentary election. The list won sixty-four seats, and Kuntić was awarded a mandate when the new parliament convened. The election did not produce a clear winner, and the Democratic Party ultimately formed an unstable coalition government with the rival Democratic Party of Serbia (DSS) and G17 Plus. Kuntić supported the ministry and was a member of the committee for agriculture and the committee for international relations.

He resigned as deputy mayor of Subotica in late 2007, after the Republic Agency for the Prevention of Conflicts of Interest ruled that he could not hold a dual mandate as a parliamentarian and an executive member of the local government.

The DS–DSS coalition broke down in early 2008, and a new parliamentary election was held in May of that year. The DS contested the election at the head of an alliance called For a European Serbia (ZES), which also included the DSHV. Kuntić received the ninety-eighth position on the ZES list and was given a mandate for a second term when the list won 102 seats. As in 2007, the election did not produce a clear winner. After extended negotiations, ZES formed a coalition government with the Socialist Party of Serbia, and Kuntić again supported the ministry. He was a member of the committee for international relations and the committee for science and technological development, a deputy member of the agriculture committee, and a member of the parliamentary friendship groups with Bosnia and Herzegovina and Croatia. He also served on an interstate commission for monitoring an agreement between Serbia and Croatia on the rights of Serbs in Croatia and Croats in Serbia.

Serbia held the second election for the Croatian National Council in 2010. The DSHV won eighteen seats, while a separate list affiliated with For a European Serbia won eleven. Kuntić was elected to a second term, seemingly after appearing in the seventh position on the DSHV list.

Serbia reformed its electoral system again in 2011, such that all parliamentary mandates were awarded in numerical order to candidates on successful lists. Kuntić appeared in the fifty-fourth position on the DS's coalition list in the 2012 parliamentary election and was re-elected when the list won sixty-seven seats. The Serbian Progressive Party (SNS) and its allies won the election and afterward formed a new coalition government with the Socialists and other parties, while the DS and its allies moved into opposition. In his final parliamentary term, Kuntić was a member of the agriculture committee (Note: Formally known as the Committee on Agriculture, Forestry, and Water Management.) and the committee for human and minority rights and gender equality, a deputy member of the education committee, (Note: Formally known as the Committee on Education, Science, Technological Development, and the Information Society.) and a member of the friendship groups with Bosnia and Herzegovina, Croatia, and Montenegro.

Although the DSHV continued its alliance with the DS at the republic level, it withdrew its support at the city level in Subotica in November 2013 and instead supported a new coalition government led by the Alliance of Vojvodina Hungarians and the Serbian Progressive Party.

Kuntić appeared in the twenty-fifth position on the DS's list in the 2014 parliamentary election. The list fell to nineteen seats and he was not re-elected.

=== Since 2014 ===
Kuntić appeared in the second position on a DSHV-affiliated list led by Slaven Bačić in the 2014 election for the Croatian National Council and was re-elected when the list won twenty-one seats. He stood down as DSHV leader on 30 October 2015 and was replaced by Tomislav Žigmanov.

Kuntić ran for a seat in the Croatian Sabor in the 2015 Croatian parliamentary election, appearing as a HDZ candidate in a three-member riding reserved for members of the Croatian diaspora. Unlike Serbia, which uses closed list proportional representation for parliamentary elections, Croatia has a hybrid system that combines aspects of open list and closed list voting. Also, parties are permitted to nominate more candidates for the diaspora riding than there are available seats. While the HDZ's alliance won an overwhelming victory among the diaspora, Kuntić was not personally elected. After the vote, he identified the disproportionate electoral strength of the Bosnian Croat community as a deficiency in the system.

Kuntić withdrew from political life after the 2015 campaign to work full-time on his farm. He did not seek re-election to the Croatian National Council in 2018.

== Electoral record ==
=== Serbia ===
==== Provincial (Vojvodina) ====
2004 Vojvodina provincial election: Subotica Division 2
Candidate	Party	First round		Second round	
Candidate	Party	Votes	%	Votes	%
Mirko Bajić	Coalition: Subotica Our City	4,064	31.41	6,456	54.78
Petar Kuntić	Democratic Alliance of Croats in Vojvodina	2,536	19.60	5,329	45.22
Stipan Stipić (incumbent)	Coalition: "Together for Vojvodina–Nenad Čanak"	1,954	15.10		
Zorica Zrnić	Serbian Radical Party	1,386	10.71		
Mr (Note: Note: In this context, "Mr" stands for "Master" and refers to the candidate's academic credentials.) Miroslav Čavlin	Democratic Party of Serbia	819	6.33		
Mirko Prćić	G17 Plus	815	6.30		
Jelena Birovljev	Strength of Serbia Movement	725	5.60		
Nikola Vizin	Bunjevac Party	639	4.94		
Total		12,938	100.00	11,785	100.00
Valid votes		12,938	96.06	11,785	95.38
Invalid/blank votes		531	3.94	571	4.62
Total votes		13,469	100.00	12,356	100.00

1996 Vojvodina provincial election: Subotica Division 4
Candidate	Party
Ivan Vojnić Tunić (***WINNER***)	Socialist Party of Serbia
Petar Kuntić	Democratic Alliance of Croats in Vojvodina
other candidates	
Total

==== Municipal (Subotica) ====
1996 Subotica municipal election: Ker Division 2
Candidate	Party
Blaško Gabrić (***WINNER***)	Subotica Civic Alliance
Petar Kuntić	Democratic Alliance of Croats in Vojvodina
other candidates	
Total

==== Leadership contests ====
DSHV leadership convention, 29 February 2004
Candidate	Party	Votes	%
Petar Kuntić	Democratic Alliance of Croats in Vojvodina	216	76.60
Blaško Temunović	Democratic Alliance of Croats in Vojvodina	66	23.40
Total		282	100.00

=== Croatia ===
2015 Croatian parliamentary election: XI. Croatians abroad (three seats)

Party	Votes	%	Seats
Patriotic Coalition (Croatian Democratic Union - HDZ; Croatian Peasant Party - HSS; Croatian Party of Rights — Dr. Ante Starčević - HSP AS; Bloc Pensioners Together - BUZ; Croatian Social Liberal Party - HSLS; Croatian Growth - HRAST; Croatian Demochristian Party - HDS; Democratic Party of Zagorje - ZDS)	24,444	85.69	3
Labour and Solidarity ("Bandić Milan 365 – Labour and Solidarity Party"; Democratic Party of Prigorje and Zagreb - DPS; Women's Democratic Party - DSŽ; Croatian European Party - HES; Croatian Workers Party - HRS; Croatian Green Party - Ecological Alliance - Zeleni; Istrian Democrats - Democratici Istriani - ID - DI; Međimurje Party - MS; Independent Croatian Peasants - NHS; New Wave - Development Party - New Wave; Party of Pensioners - SU; Pensioners Democratic Union - UDU; Green Alliance - Zeleni; Green Party - ZS)	1,226	4.30	–
The Bridge of Independent Lists - MOST	1,111	3.89	–
In the Name of the Family – Project Homeland	437	1.53	–
Successful Croatia (People's Party – Reformists - NS-R; Forward Croatia!-Progressive Alliance Ivo Josipović - NHPS; Party of Croatian Pensioners - Pensioners; Green Forum - ZF; Dubrovnik Democratic Assembly - DDS)	332	1.16	–
Sustainable Development of Croatia - ORaH	260	0.91	–
Independent List	191	0.67	–
Socialist Labour Party of Croatia - SRP	177	0.62	–
Autochthonous - Croatian Party of Rights - A - HSP	128	0.45	–
Croatian Conservative Party - HKS; Croatian Party of Rights - HSP; Family Party - OS	121	0.42	–
Croatian Christian Democratic Union - HKDU; Croatian Democratic Party - HDS; National Democrats - ND	98	0.34	–
Total	28,525	100.00	3
Valid votes	28,525	98.55	
Invalid/blank votes	419	1.45	
Total votes	28,944	100.00	

Note: The Croatian diaspora vote is typically a very strong bastion of support for the Croatian Democratic Union (HDZ) and for right-wing candidates generally. Croatia Is Growing, the country's main centre-left alliance in 2015, did not field a slate of candidates for Croatians abroad.

Patriotic Coalition candidates
Number	Name	Political party or movement	Votes	%	Notes
1	Božo Ljubić	Croatian Democratic Union	2,936	12.01	Elected (received more than 10% of Patriotic Coalition votes)
2	Ivan Šuker	Croatian Democratic Union	2,040	8.35	Incumbent; re-elected (list position)
3	Nevenko Barbarić	Croatian Democratic Union	1,717	7.02	
4	Željko Raguž	Croatian Democratic Union	1,229	5.03	
5	Mijo Crnoja	Croatian Democratic Union	81	0.33	
6	Ante Jukić	Croatian Peasant Party	500	2.05	
7	Dragan Konta	Croatian Democratic Union	82	0.34	
8	Željko Glasnović	Non-Party (Croatian Democratic Union endorsement)	7,374	30.17	Elected (received more than 10% of Patriotic Coalition votes)
9	Ivan Sablić	Croatian Democratic Union	156	0.64	
10	Miroslav Piplica	Croatian Democratic Union	216	0.88	
11	Petar Kuntić	Croatian Democratic Union	156	0.64	
12	Zvonimir Banović	Croatian Democratic Union	681	2.79	
13	Darija Prskalo	Croatian Democratic Union	296	1.21	
14	Ilija Janović	Croatian Democratic Union	135	0.55	
