= European Regions (Serbia) =

Parliamentary group in the National Assembly of Serbia

European Regions Европски региони Evropski regioni
- Chamber: National Assembly
- Foundation: 1 August 2022
- Dissolution: 25 October 2022
- Representation: 5 / 250
- Ideology: Minority interests; Regionalism; Autonomism

The European Regions (Serbian Cyrillic: Европски региони, romanized: Evropski regioni, ER) was a parliamentary group in the National Assembly of Serbia. The group was composed of the Party of Democratic Action of Sandžak (SDA S), Democratic Alliance of Croats in Vojvodina (DSHV), Party for Democratic Action (PVD), and Together for Vojvodina (ZZV).

== History ==
The parliamentary group was formed by deputies of national minority parties at the first session of the 13th National Assembly. Aleksandar Olenik from ZZV became the leader of the group, Enis Imamović from SDA S became the deputy. On 23 October, it was announced that Tomislav Žigmanov, the leader of the Democratic Alliance of Croats in Vojvodina (DSHV), will be appointed minister of human and minority rights and social dialogue, with Žigmanov adding that the European Regions parliamentary group will be supportive of Aleksandar Vučić. This led to Olenik's announcement that ZZV would terminate its coalition with DSHV, but it would remain in the parliamentary group. Žigmanov resigned as a member of parliament on 25 October 2022, which led to the dissolution of the parliamentary group; Žigmanov was replaced by Mirko Ostrogonac a day later.

== Composition ==
This table shows the parties whose deputies sat in this parliamentary group.

| Name | Leader | Main ideology | Political position | MPs |
|---|---|---|---|---|
| Party of Democratic Action of Sandžak (SDA S) | Sulejman Ugljanin | Bosniak minority interests | Right-wing | 2 / 250 |
| Party for Democratic Action (PVD) | Shaip Kamberi | Albanian minority interests | Centre-right | 1 / 250 |
| Democratic Alliance of Croats in Vojvodina (DSHV) | Tomislav Žigmanov | Croat minority interests | | 1 / 250 |
| Together for Vojvodina (ZZV) | Olena Papuga | Vojvodina autonomism | Centre-left | 1 / 250 |
