= Vesna Prćić =

Vesna Prćić (Serbian Cyrillic: Весна Прћић; born 1973) is a Serbian politician and administrator from the country's Croat community. She has been a member of Serbia's Croatian National Council and was a delegate in the Vojvodina provincial assembly from 2016 to 2020, serving with the Democratic Alliance of Croats in Vojvodina (DSHV).

== Private career ==
Prćić is from Subotica and holds a Bachelor of Laws degree. She is the director of the public utility company Pogrebno in Subotica.

== Politician and community representative ==
=== Croatian National Council ===
Membership on the Croatian National Council is determined by an electoral college of experts and community leaders. Prćić was an elector for the 2010 council election. In the 2014 election, she appeared in the third position on an electoral list led by Slaven Bačić and was elected when the list won a majority victory with twenty-one out of twenty-nine seats. She served for the term that followed and was not a candidate for re-election in 2018.

=== Member of the provincial assembly ===
The DSHV contested the 2016 Vojvodina provincial election as part of an electoral alliance led by the Democratic Party (DS). Prćić received the tenth position on the DS's list and was elected when the list won exactly ten seats. She was the sole DSHV delegate in the sitting of the assembly that followed. The Serbian Progressive Party (SNS) and its allies won a majority victory, and she served with the DS caucus in opposition.

In early 2017, Prćić attracted media attention for saying that the DSHV should support SNS leader Aleksandar Vučić in the 2017 Serbian presidential election. DSHV leader Tomislav Žigmanov indicated his surprise at this statement and said he was certain the party would not follow Prćić's recommendation. The party ultimately decided against supporting any candidate.

Prćić did not seek re-election in 2020.
