= Enis Imamović =

Serbian politician (born 1984)

Member of the National Assembly of the Republic of Serbia
- In office 25 July 2012 – 6 February 2024

Member of the Parliamentary Assembly of the Council of Europe
- In office 25 January 2021 – 9 October 2022

Personal details
- Born: June 25, 1984 (age 42) Novi Pazar, SR Serbia, SFR Yugoslavia
- Party: SDA (until 2023)
- Education: State University of Novi Pazar
- Occupation: Politician

Enis Imamović (Serbian Cyrillic: Енис Имамовић; born 25 June 1984) is a Serbian politician from the country's Bosniak community. He served in the Serbian national assembly from 2012 to 2024 and was a leading member of the Party of Democratic Action of Sandžak (SDA) for many years until leaving the party in late 2023.

== Early life and private career ==
Imamović was born in Novi Pazar, in the Sandžak region of what was then the Socialist Republic of Serbia in the Socialist Federal Republic of Yugoslavia. He has a degree in biochemistry from the State University of Novi Pazar and is a professor of the subject. He was also a professional volleyball player in his youth.

== Politician ==
=== Party of Democratic Action of Sandžak ===
Imamović joined the SDA's youth wing in 2003. In 2008, he was elected as one of the party's vice-presidents and appointed as a party spokesperson.

In January 2009, Imamović charged that a mob encouraged by rival parties sought to assassinate SDA leader Sulejman Ugljanin during a confrontation at the Novi Pazar headquarters of the SDA-led Bosniak List for a European Sandžak alliance. The Sandžak Democratic Party (SDP), the SDA's principal rival at the time, rejected the claim that anyone sought to harm Ugljanin, let alone assassinate him. Imamović later accused local authorities of witness intimidation and other abuses of power relating to the incident.

==== Parliamentarian ====
===== 2012–2016 =====
Imamović was given the third position on the SDA's electoral list in the 2012 Serbian parliamentary election. The party won two mandates; he was not immediately elected but received a seat on 25 July 2012 as the replacement for Ifeta Radončić, who resigned on the day the assembly convened. The SDA initially served in a parliamentary group with the People's Party (NP), with Maja Gojković serving as the group's leader and Imamović as its deputy leader. This arrangement did not last, and the SDA deputies afterward served on their own, without affiliation to any assembly group. In this sitting of the assembly, Imamović was a member of the parliamentary friendship groups with Azerbaijan, Bosnia and Herzegovina, France, Germany, Turkey, the United Kingdom, and the United States of America. The SDA was part of Serbia's coalition government in this period, and he served as a supporter of the administration.

Imamović was promoted to the second position on the SDA's list for the 2014 parliamentary election and was re-elected when the party won three seats. The SDA left the government after the election and moved into opposition, forming an assembly group with the Party for Democratic Action (PDD), a party representing Serbia's Albanian community. In his second term, Imamović was a member of the economy committee, (Note: Formally known as the Committee for the Economy, Regional Development, Trade, Tourism, and Energy.) a deputy member of the labour committee, (Note: Formally known as the Committee for Labour, Social Issues, Social Inclusion, and Poverty Reduction.) a deputy member of Serbia's delegation to the Parliamentary Assembly of the Mediterranean, and a member of the friendship groups with Algeria, Austria, Azerbaijan, Bosnia and Herzegovina, China, Croatia, the Czech Republic, France, Germany, India, Indonesia, Iran, Kuwait, Lebanon, Luxembourg, the Republic of Macedonia, Montenegro, Morocco, Russia, Saudi Arabia, Slovakia, Slovenia, Tunisia, Turkey, the United Kingdom, and the United States. In September 2014, he proposed a type of autonomy for the Sandžak similar to that of South Tyrol in Italy.

===== 2016–22 =====
Imamović again received the second position on the SDA's list in the 2016 parliamentary election and was elected for a third term when the list won two seats. The SDA sat in an assembly group with the Liberal Democratic Party (LDP) and the League of Social Democrats of Vojvodina (LSV) after the election, and Imamović served as its deputy leader. In this parliament, he was a member of the labour committee and the committee on human and minority rights and gender equality, a deputy member of the committee for culture and information and the committee on the rights of the child, a member of a working group for the rights of minorities, a member of Serbia's delegation to the Parliamentary Assembly of the Mediterranean, and a deputy member of its delegation to the parliamentary dimension of the Central European Initiative.

He was promoted to the lead position on the SDA's list in the 2020 Serbian parliamentary election and was elected to a fourth term when the party won three mandates. The SDA afterward formed an assembly group with the Albanian Democratic Alternative (a coalition led by the PDD), and Imamović once again served in the role of deputy leader. He was a member of the committee for European integration, a deputy member of the labour committee, the president of Serbia's parliamentary friendship group with Luxembourg, and a member of the friendship groups with Albania, Algeria, Austria, Azerbaijan, Belgium, Bosnia and Herzegovina, Canada, Croatia, France, Germany, Indonesia, Montenegro, Norway, Palestine, Portugal, Slovenia, Sweden, Switzerland, Turkey, the United Kingdom, and the United States. In July 2021, he took part in a SDA–Albanian Democratic Alternative delegation that met with Albin Kurti, prime minister of the Republic of Kosovo (which is not recognized by Serbia). During the meeting, the SDA indicated its support for the independence of Kosovo.

Imamović was also appointed as a member of Serbia's delegation to the Parliamentary Assembly of the Council of Europe (PACE) on 25 January 2021. In the PACE, he was a full member of social affairs committee (Note: Formally known as the Committee on Social Affairs, Health, and Sustainable Development.) and the migration committee. (Note: Formally known as the Committee on Migration, Refugees, and Displaced Persons.) He did not serve with any assembly grouping.

===== 2022 election and after =====
Imamović again appeared in the lead position on the SDA's list in the 2022 Serbian parliamentary election and was re-elected when the list won two seats. After the election, the SDA became part of an assembly group called European Regions that also included delegates from Vojvodina and from Serbia's Albanian community. Imamović was the group's deputy leader. The group ceased to exist when one of its members, Tomislav Žigmanov, was appointed as a minister in the Serbian government. The SDA delegates did not serve with any assembly group after this time.

In the 2022–24 term, Imamović was a member of the environmental protection committee, a deputy member of the health and family committee, a member of Serbia's delegation to the South-East European Cooperation Process parliamentary assembly, and a member of the parliamentary friendship groups with Albania, Austria, Azerbaijan, Belgium, Bosnia and Herzegovina, Croatia, France, Germany, Indonesia, Montenegro, Norway, Palestine, Slovenia, Spain, Switzerland, Turkey, Ukraine, the United Kingdom, and the United States. His term in the PACE ended on 9 October 2022.

Imamović met with Albin Kurti again in February 2023, as part of a SDA–PDD delegation that called for reciprocity of rights between the Kosovo Serb community and Bosniaks and Albanians living in Serbia.

Excluding the period from 2012 to 2014, Imamović was an opposition member for his entire tenure in the Serbian national assembly.

==== Municipal politics ====
Imamović led the SDA's list for the Novi Pazar city assembly in the 2016 Serbian local elections and was elected when the list won eleven mandates. He resigned his seat on 27 June 2016. He appeared in the second position on the party's list for the 2020 local elections and was again elected when the list won nine seats. On this occasion, he resigned on 6 August 2021.

=== Departure from the SDA ===
Imamović resigned from the SDA on 22 October 2023. His decision drew attention to ongoing divisions in the party; it was noted in the Serbian media that a pro-Albanian faction of the SDA had recently seen its influence diminish and that Imamović's departure from the party was prompted and prefigured by a split in the Party of Democratic Action of Bosnia and Herzegovia. Imamović initially said that he would lead an independent list in the 2023 Serbian parliamentary election, and rumours circulated that he would join forces with former Justice and Reconciliation Party (SPP) member Jahja Fehratović. He later changed his position and said that he would not be a candidate but would create a new political movement after the election. The SDA reported that Imamović resigned his assembly mandate when he resigned from the party; if so, this was not recognized by the national assembly, which considers that he remained a member until the new parliament convened in February 2024.

Despite having left the SDA, Imamović endorsed the party's list in Tutin for the 2024 Serbian local elections.
