= Bela Tonković =

Serbian politician

Bela Tonković (Serbian Cyrillic: Бела Тонковић; born 16 June 1944) is a Serbian former politician from the country's Croat community. He was first leader of the Democratic Alliance of Croats in Vojvodina (DSHV), serving in the role from 1990 to 2003. During the Yugoslav Wars of the 1990s, he was recognized as the primary spokesperson for Serbia's Croat community. He was also a deputy mayor of Subotica from 2000 to 2003 and a member of the Vojvodina provincial assembly from 2000 to 2004.

Tonković was removed as DSHV leader in July 2003 and was expelled from the party later in the year.

== Early life and career ==
Tonković was born in Subotica near the end of World War II. The city was part of the Serbian territory annexed to Hungary in 1941; within a few months of his birth, it was liberated by Soviet troops, who soon ceded control to the Yugoslav Partisans. In 1945, the city became part of the newly formed Federal People's Republic of Yugoslavia.

After attending secondary school in Subotica and Zagreb, Tonković received a degree in theology and philosophy in Rome. He lived abroad for several years, working as an educator, before returning to Yugoslavia in 1984.

== Politician ==
=== Early years as party leader ===
The Democratic Alliance of Croats in Vojvodina was founded on 15 July 1990, after the de jure return of multiparty democracy to Serbia, and Tonković was chosen as the party's first leader. In his speech at the DSHV's founding convention, he outlined its platform as being focused on human rights and the preservation of national identity, with a particular emphasis on the equality of linguistic, cultural, religious, political, and economic rights among different national communities. The DSHV won a single seat in the 1990 Serbian parliamentary election, in which Tonković was not a candidate.

==== During the Croatian War (1991–95) ====
Although Serbia was nominally a multiparty democracy in the 1990s, its political culture was dominated by the authoritarian rule of Socialist Party of Serbia (SPS) leader Slobodan Milošević and his allies. The outbreak of the Croatian War in 1991, followed by the Bosnian War in 1992, placed Vojvodina's Croat community in a particularly vulnerable position, with its members often depicted as disloyal or "fifth column" elements.

In early 1992, Tonković and other DSHV officials attended a peace conference in Brussels, where they submitted a report documenting violations of the human, civil, and collective rights of the Croatian people in Serbia. On returning to Serbia, he said that the delegation drew particular attention to "the presentation of Croats in the [Serbian] media, which, with honourable exceptions, are all under the control of the regime and which systematically create anti-Croat sentiment, to such an extent that it can be freely compared to the creation of anti-Semitism in the Third Reich." He added, "We drew attention to the destruction of property and cultural and religious monuments of Croats, by demolition, burning, machine-gunning, bombs and other means, in order to drive them away from their homes in Vojvodina."

When asked directly about the loyalty of Croat citizens, he responded, "Our loyalty is being questioned mostly because of our call not to respond to a fratricidal war. If Serbia is not at war, (Note: The Republic of Serbia was technically not a belligerent in the Croatian and Bosnian wars.) then it is pointless to ask the question of the loyalty of Croats as citizens of the Republic of Serbia. Then only the question of loyalty to the [political] regime remains. And why should we be loyal to it? I would rather ask the question about the loyalty of the Republic of Serbia (as a state) towards its citizens." In August 1992, Tonković offered support for a peace plan based on Lord Carrington's proposals and urged the official recognition of cultural autonomy for Croats in Serbia. He continued to advocate for the rights of the Croat community in Serbia at an international level throughout the war years.

Tonković met with Croatian assembly president Stjepan Mesić in Zagreb in July 1993 and announced that plans were underway to establish a Croatian National Council that would, as he described it, unite all Croats from Vojvodina to the Bay of Kotor.

In June 1995, Tonković said that there had been eight cases of murdered and missing Vojvodina Croats since the beginning of the conflict, as well as a general campaign of intimidation, including bomb and arson attacks, that had resulted in about forty thousand Croats moving out of Serbia. He charged that the state was doing nothing to protect the community and, moreover, was systematically removing Croats from positions of authority in the police force, the judiciary, and the education system.

The Croatian War effectively ended in August 1995 with Croatia's victory in Operation Storm, followed by the resettlement of a large number of Serb refugees from the Republic of Serbian Krajina into Vojvodina. Tonković has said that Vojvodina's Croats were targeted with increased repression in this period. In an interview conducted several years after the war, he said that he and the DSHV urged the Croatian government to freeze the exchange of Serbian POWs until Serbia ended the repression, adding that Serbian authorities then "stopped the worst terror" and that the situation eventually returned to some degree of normalcy.

==== Member of the Subotica city assembly (1992–96) ====
Tonković was elected to the Subotica city assembly for the twenty-third division (Ker 1) in the May 1992 Serbian local elections, the first to be held after the return of multi-party democracy to Serbia. The DSHV won six seats in total and afterward joined a coalition government in the city led by the Democratic Fellowship of Vojvodina Hungarians (VMDK). Stanka Kujundžić, a prominent DSHV official, was chosen as deputy mayor, and Tonković served in the assembly as a supporter of the local administration.

Tonković also sought election to the Vojvodina assembly in the May 1992 provincial election, which took place concurrently with the local vote. Running in Subotica's sixth division, he was defeated in the second round by Nikola Babić of the Bunjevac-Šokac Party.

The May 1992 elections were boycotted by many of Serbia's leading opposition parties. Due to ongoing questions about the legitimacy of the vote, the Serbian government held new elections, including at the local level, in December 1992. Tonković was re-elected to the Subotica assembly, and the governing VMDK–DSHV alliance won an increased victory in the city overall. At Tonković's initiative, the city assembly voted on 4 November 1993 to give the Croatian language official status in Subotica.

=== The late 1990s ===
Tonković's leadership of the DSHV came under increased scrutiny in the late 1990s, with critics charging that he was leading the party in an autocratic manner and had become too close to official interests in Zagreb. Tonković responded that his critics were endangering the political unity of Vojvodina Croats and said that, under his leadership, "the DSHV was the only one to raise its voice against the persecution of Croats" during the Yugoslav Wars." Despite some challenges, he retained his position as party leader in this period.

He appeared in the lead position on the DSHV's electoral list for Subotica in the 1996 Yugoslavian parliamentary election. The list did not win any seats. He was also defeated in his bid for re-election to the Subotica assembly in the concurrent 1996 Serbian local elections.

Tonković welcomed the announcement of a Croatian consulate for Subotica in 1998, describing it as a sign of normalization between Serbia and Croatia.

=== Deputy Mayor (2000–03) and provincial delegate (2000–04) ===
The Democratic Opposition of Serbia (DOS) was created in early 2000 by an alliance of Serbian political parties opposed to Slobodan Milošević's continued rule. Although the DSHV was not part of the DOS at the republic level, it worked with the alliance at the local and provincial levels in Subotica. DOS candidate Vojislav Koštunica defeated Milošević in the 2000 Yugoslavian presidential election, and Milošević subsequently fell from power on 5 October 2000, a watershed moment in Serbian politics.

Tonković was elected to the Subotica assembly as a DOS candidate in the 2000 Serbian local elections and to the Vojvodina assembly in the 2000 provincial election, both of which took place concurrently with the Yugoslavian vote. The DOS won a landslide victory in the Subotica with fifty-nine out of sixty-seven seats; when the new city assembly convened on 17 October 2000, Tonković was named as one of two assembly vice-presidents, a position that was then equivalent to deputy mayor. At the provincial level, the DOS and its affiliated parties won almost every seat in the assembly, and Tonković served as a supporter of the new administration.

As a member of the 2000–04 Vojvodina provincial assembly, Tonković played a role in returning the Croatian language to official status in the province, increasing access to Croatian language education, and establishing the Hrvatska riječ (Croatian Word) newspaper and publishing firm.

=== Fall from power ===
The DSHV's internal divisions increased after 2000, and on 6 July 2003 an extraordinary assembly of the party voted to dismiss Tonković as leader. A subsequent editorial in Hrvastka riječ described him as having run the party in an authoritarian manner, of choosing and changing associates in an arbitrary way, and of undermining the party's support base, while a Zagreb weekly described his downfall as representing "a belated de-Tuđmanization in the diaspora," referring to the liberalization of Croatian politics after Franjo Tuđman's death in 1999.

On 11 October 2003, Tonković was expelled from the DSHV entirely. On 10 November 2003, he was removed as deputy mayor by a vote of the Subotica assembly. He did not seek re-election at either the local or the provincial level in 2004.

=== Views on Croatian identity ===
Tonković holds the view that Vojvodina Croats are an indigenous people to the area and "part of the entire Croatian people as such." He argues that Croatian identity in the area has been targeted by successive waves of attempted assimilation, including Hungarianization, Serbianization, and Yugoslavism.

When asked about the DSHV in 2020, Tonković said, "Exactly seventeen years ago, I was expelled from the party. Since I am no longer a member, I feel that it is not up to me to judge and evaluate her work and achievements. [...] As a member of the Croatian nation, I think that the old plan of depoliticization of the Croatian national minority in the Republic of Serbia is being successfully implemented."

=== Attendance at a DSHV meeting in 2025 ===
In 2025, a group of twenty-four members of the DSHV's governing council voted to remove Tomislav Žigmanov as party leader, contending that he was running the party in an undemocratic, arbitrary, and non-transparent manner, particularly in regards to his negotiations with Aleksandar Vučić for entry into Serbia's government. Tonković attended this meeting and was thanked by the councillors for his presence and support. Žigmanov did not accept the decision of the councillors as legitimate. The Basic Court of Subotica later ruled that the meeting was improperly constituted and that its decisions were null and void.

== Electoral record ==
=== Provincial (Vojvodina) ===
2000 Vojvodina provincial election: Subotica Division 6
Candidate	Party	Votes	%
Bela Tonković	Democratic Opposition of Serbia (Affiliation: Democratic Alliance of Croats in Vojvodina)		elected
Zlatko Lebović	Serbian Radical Party		
other candidates			
Total			

May 1992 Vojvodina provincial election: Subotica Division 6
Candidate	Party	Votes	%
Nikola Babić	Bunjevac-Šokac Party		elected in the second round
Bela Tonković	Democratic Alliance of Croats in Vojvodina		defeated in the second round
Mirko Bajić	Civic Movement for Subotica – Doves of Subotica		
Stevan Bošnjak	Socialist Party of Serbia		
Sándor Kalmár	Citizens' Group		
Dr. Sava Lutkić	Yugoslavian Party		
Total			
Source: All candidates except Babić and Tonković are listed alphabetically.

=== Local (Subotica) ===
2000 Subotica city election: Division 23 (Ker 1)
Candidate	Party	Votes	%
Bela Tonković	Democratic Opposition of Serbia (Affiliation: Democratic Alliance of Croats in Vojvodina)		elected
Blaško Gabrić (incumbent for Ker 2)	ECOLOGICAL PARTY OF VOJVODINA		
Mirko Gabrić (incumbent)	Citizens' Group		
Radislav Lančuški	Serbian Radical Party		
Zdenka Vojnić Tunić	Alliance of Citizens of Subotica–Reformists of Vojvodina		
Total			
Source: All candidates except Tonković are listed alphabetically.

1996 Subotica city election: Division 23 (Ker 1)
Candidate	Party	First round		Second round	
Candidate	Party	Votes	%	Votes	%
Mirko Gabrić	Citizens' Group		23.99		elected in the second round
Bela Tonković (incumbent)	Democratic Alliance of Croats in Vojvodina		24.73		defeated in the second round
Stevan Gabrić Srko	Alliance of Citizens of Subotica				
Ratko Kerleta	Serbian Radical Party				
Stipan Kovačević Pićan	Citizens' Group				
Total					
Source: Stevan Gabrić, Kerlata, and Kovačević are listed alphabetically.

December 1992 Subotica city election: Division 23 (Ker 1)
Candidate	Party	Votes	%
Bela Tonković (incumbent)	Democratic Alliance of Croats in Vojvodina		elected in the second round
Petar Babić	Bunjevac-Šokac Party–Federal Party of Yugoslavs		
Todor Ivanković Čiča	Citizens' Group		
Sanda Tišma	Civic Movement for Subotica – Doves of Subotica–Reform Democratic Party of Vojvodina– Democratic Party–League of Social Democrats of Vojvodina–Democratic Movement of Serbia		
Total			
Source: All candidates except Tonković are listed alphabetically.

May 1992 Subotica city election: Division 23 (Ker 1)
Candidate	Party	First round		Second round	
Candidate	Party	Votes	%	Votes	%
Bela Tonković	Democratic Alliance of Croats in Vojvodina			197	59.52
Petar Babić	Bunjevac-Šokac Party			134	40.48
Stanko Zdravković	Socialist Party of Serbia				
Total				331	100.00
