= Nikola Babić =

Nikola Babić may refer to:

- Nikola Babić (footballer) (1905–1974), Croatian footballer
- Nikola Babić (politician) (born 1942), Bunjevac politician in Serbia
- Nikola Babić (film director) (1935–2015), Croatian film director
