= Vjerica Radeta =

Serbian politician

- Вјерица Радета

Vice President of the National Assembly of the Republic of Serbia
- In office 6 June 2016 – 3 August 2020

Member of the National Assembly of the Republic of Serbia
- In office 3 June 2016 – 3 August 2020
- In office 25 August 2003 – 31 May 2012

Substitute Member of the Parliamentary Assembly of the Council of Europe
- In office 25 June 2007 – 1 October 2012

Personal details
- Born: Vjerica Maljković; 15 October 1955 (age 71) Livno, PR Bosnia and Herzegovina, Yugoslavia
- Party: SRS
- Education: Faculty of Law
- Alma mater: University of Sarajevo
- Occupation: Politician

Vjerica Radeta (née Maljković; Serbian Cyrillic: Вјерица Радета, née Маљковић; born 15 October 1955) is a Serbian politician. She is a prominent figure in the far-right Serbian Radical Party (SRS) and has served several terms in the Serbian parliament.

== Early life and career ==
Radeta was born in Livno, in what was then the People's Republic of Bosnia and Herzegovina in the Federal People's Republic of Yugoslavia. A graduate of the University of Sarajevo's law faculty, she later moved to Serbia and now resides in the Belgrade municipality of Zemun. She was secretary of the Zemun municipal assembly in the late 1990s, when the Radicals governed the municipality.

== Politician ==
=== The late Milošević years (1998–2000) ===
After several years in opposition, the Radical Party joined a coalition government led by the Socialist Party of Serbia (SPS) in February 1998, and Radeta was appointed as deputy justice minister in the government of Serbian prime minister Mirko Marjanović. In February 2000, following the Kosovo War, she was included on a list of Serbian government officials banned from travelling to European Union countries.

Radeta was given the fifth and final position on the Radical Party's electoral list for New Belgrade in the 2000 Yugoslavian Chamber of Citizens election. The Radicals won a single seat in the division, which was automatically assigned to their lead candidate, party leader Vojislav Šešelj. Radeta also ran for the Belgrade city assembly in the concurrent 2000 Serbian local elections and lost to a candidate of the Democratic Opposition of Serbia (DOS) in Zemun's eleventh division. Both the parliamentary and the local elections were overshadowed by the 2000 Yugoslavian presidential election, in which longtime authoritarian leader Slobodan Milošević of the SPS fell from power after losing to DOS candidate Vojislav Koštunica. The Serbian government also fell after Milošević's defeat, and Radeta's tenure as a deputy minister ended in October 2000.

=== Parliamentarian (2003–2012) ===
==== Živković and Koštunica administrations (2003–08) ====
Serbia held a new parliamentary election in December 2000, and Radeta appeared in the forty-second position on the Radical Party's list. The SRS won twenty-three seats, and she was not initially included in her party's assembly delegation. (From 2000 to 2011, Serbian parliamentary mandates were awarded to sponsoring parties or coalitions rather than to individual candidates, and it was common practice for the mandates to be assigned out of numerical order. Radeta could have been included in the SRS delegation at the start of parliament despite her low position on the list, but she was not.) The DOS won a landslide victory, and the Radical Party served in opposition. Radeta received a mandate on 25 March 2003 as the replacement for another SRS member who had resigned.

She was given the thirty-fifth position on the Radical Party's list in the 2003 Serbian parliamentary election and was awarded a mandate for a second term when the list won eighty-two seats. Although the Radicals won more seats than any other party in this election, they fell well short of a majority and continued to serve in opposition. After the election, Radeta served as deputy chair of the judiciary and administration committee and was a member of the committee on constitutional affairs. In 2005, she sought to amend Serbia's information law to ban the registration of media outlets that, in her words, "report[ed] notorious lies by pathological liar Nataša Kandić," a Serbian human rights activist and vocal opponent of Serbian nationalism.

She was included in the twelfth position on the Radical Party's list in the 2007 parliamentary election and was given a mandate for a third term when the party won eighty-one seats. As before, the Radicals won the greatest number of seats but could not form government and remained in opposition. Radeta served as deputy chair of the legislative committee and as a member of the judiciary committee and the constitutional affairs committee; she was also a member of Serbia's republic election commission (RIK) during this time.

==== Cvetković administration (2008–12) ====
Radeta appeared in the eighth position on the SRS list in the 2008 parliamentary election and was again included in her party's delegation when the list won seventy-eight seats. The overall results of this election were inconclusive, and the Radicals afterward held discussions with the Democratic Party of Serbia (DSS) and the Socialists about forming a new coalition government. This ultimately did not happen. The Socialists instead joined a coalition government led by the For a European Serbia (ZES) alliance, and the Radicals continued in opposition. In this term, Radeta again served on the legislative, constitutional affairs, and judiciary committees and was a member of the committee on inter-ethnic relations and Serbia's parliamentary friendship group with Japan.

In July 2008, Radeta took part in a Belgrade rally against the Serbian government's decision to extradite former Bosnian Serb leader Radovan Karadžić to the International Criminal Tribunal for the former Yugoslavia (ICTY) in The Hague for crimes committed during the Bosnian War. At a Radical Party press conference, she said that Serbian president Boris Tadić could meet the same fate as Zoran Đinđić, the former Serbian prime minister who was assassinated in 2003 after approving the extradition of Slobodan Milošević. Radeta was quoted as saying, "We are not threatening (him), but we are warning of the curse which followed all the traitors in Serbian history." She also said that the Radicals had asked the Serbian Orthodox Church to state its opinion on the extradition in the hope that the church would excommunicate and cast anathemas on Tadić. (This did not occur, and the church did not take any action against Tadić.) Radeta's comments were widely reported in the international media, including the New York Times. Nada Kolundžija, a prominent member of Tadić's Democratic Party (DS), said that "Radeta's comments could be interpreted as a call for violence, as justification for [Đinđić]'s murder." Some of Tadić's supporters called for legal action to be taken against Radeta.

The Radical Party experienced a serious split later in 2008, with several prominent members joining the more moderate Serbian Progressive Party (SNS) under the leadership of Tomislav Nikolić and Aleksandar Vučić. Radeta remained with the Radicals and was considered a leading figure in the party's hardline wing. During an assembly debate in September 2008, after Karadžić's extradition, Radeta shouted, "A curse on every Radical, on his seed and family, who ever meets with Tadić after the shameful extradition." The Economist noted that her comment was directed at Nikolić, who had recently met with Tadić to ensure the passage of a key agreement with the European Union.

Serbia's electoral system was reformed in 2011, such that all parliamentary mandates were awarded to candidates on successful lists in numerical order. Radeta received the sixth position on the Radical Party's list in the 2012 parliamentary election and was given the same position in the 2014 election. The party fell below the electoral threshold for assembly representation on both occasions, and she was not elected.

=== Return to parliament and after (2016–present) ===
The Radicals won twenty-two seats in the 2016 parliamentary election. Radeta, who again received the sixth position on the party's list, was elected to a fifth term. The Progressives won the election, and the Radicals once again served in opposition. Radeta became the deputy leader of the SRS assembly group and was elected as one of the assembly's six deputy speakers. She was also a member of the committee on constitutional and legal issues, the committee on the rights of the child, and the judiciary committee; (Note: Formally known by this time as the Committee on the Judiciary, Public Administration, and Local Self-government.) a deputy member of the administrative committee; (Note: Formally known by this time as the Committee on Administrative, Budgetary, Mandate, and Immunity Issues.) and a member of the parliamentary friendship groups with Belarus, Russia, and Venezuela.

Radeta insulted Democratic Alliance of Croats in Vojvodina leader Tomislav Žigmanov in May 2018, calling him an Ustasha.

On 24 July 2018, Radeta responded to the death of Hatidža Mehmedović, founder of the Mothers of Srebrenica organization, by tweeting, "Who is going to bury her? The husband or sons?" Mehmedović's husband and two sons were killed by Serb forces in the 1995 Srebrenica massacre, and Radeta's comment was condemned by several politicians and human rights groups in Serbia. Zorana Mihajlović, one of Serbia's deputy prime ministers, said, "we are used to listening to the ugliest words from the [Radical Party] officials, but I could not believe that they are so shameless to offend the dead [...] this is not the shame for the Radicals, it is a disgrace for those who voted for them and brought them to the parliament." Representatives of the Sandžak Council for the Protection of Human Rights and Freedom urged Serbian civil society and media to distance themselves from "this sublimate of fascism" and "clearly reject it and support justice for both dead and alive.”

Radeta deleted her Twitter account in the aftermath of the controversy. Šešelj contended that Radeta's tweet had been "clumsily" expressed and its meaning misunderstood; Radeta, he said, had meant to imply that Mehmedović's husband and sons had faked their deaths and were still alive in exile under assumed names. An article in Politika from this period noted that Radeta was known for her extremely abusive language on Twitter long before this particular controversy and observed, "it would be hard for a respectable newspaper to reprint even a fraction of the epithets that the Deputy Speaker of the Assembly of Serbia used in reference to her various opponents."

Radeta was given the fifth position on the SRS list in the 2020 parliamentary election and was promoted to the fourth position for the 2022 and 2023 elections. In each case, the list failed to cross the electoral threshold.

=== Municipal representative ===
Radeta appeared in the fifth position on the SRS list for the Zemun municipal assembly in the 2004 Serbian local elections and was elected when the list won a plurality victory with twenty-six out of fifty-seven mandates. She did not seek re-election at the municipal level in 2008.

=== Parliamentary Assembly of the Council of Europe ===
Radeta was appointed as a substitute member of Serbia's delegation to the Parliamentary Assembly of the Council of Europe (PACE) on 25 June 2007 and continued in this role until 1 November 2012. For most of her tenure, she was a member of the social, health, and family affairs committee. She did not serve with any political grouping.

== Warrant for arrest ==
In January 2015, the International Criminal Tribunal for the former Yugoslavia charged Radeta and fellow Radical Party members Petar Jojić and Jovo Ostojić with contempt of court for having allegedly "threatened, intimidated, offered bribes to or otherwise interfered with" witnesses in the trial of party leader Vojislav Šešelj. According to Agence France Presse, Radeta was specifically accused of having "contacted a prosecution witness and [telling] him Šešelj's lawyers 'would help him' if he changed his testimony" in a contempt of court case against the Radical Party leader. The witness was described as having later received a monthly payment from the Radical Party and a list of questions and answers to memorize.

The three accused SRS members declined to go to The Hague to face the charges, and the Belgrade Higher Court later ruled that the country was not obligated to extradite them, determining that Serbian law only requires the extradition of persons accused of serious offences such as war crimes, not those accused of contempt of court or other comparatively minor crimes. The ICTY continued to demand that the three Radicals be extradited, arguing that Serbia's existing legal framework could not be used as an excuse for non-compliance and urging the country to change its legislation to comply with the arrest warrants. Foreign affairs minister Ivica Dačić responded in August 2016 that Serbia's law on extraditions had been adopted by the Serbian parliament in cooperation with international agencies, that no objections were raised at the time, and that the tribunal had no authority to propose changes.

In March 2017, Interpol issued high-priority red notices for the arrests of Radeta and her two colleagues. Rasim Ljajić, a deputy prime minister of Serbia, responded by stating, "There is a Serbian court ruling that they will not be surrendered. There is no legal ground for this [extradition], and we have to respect the conclusions of the independent judicial authorities."

With the wrapping up of the ICTY in December 2017, the case was transferred to the International Residual Mechanism for Criminal Tribunals (IRMCT). The matter remains unresolved as of 2025. Both Radeta and Jojić continued to serve in the national assembly until the end of their terms in 3 August 2020. Ostojić died of natural causes in June 2017 without having been arrested or extradited.

In December 2020, the IRMCT reiterated its demand that Radeta and Jojić be extradited to The Hague. In June of the following year, Serbian president Aleksandar Vučić reaffirmed his government's view that the decision of the Belgrade Higher Court was binding and that the two accused would not be extradited.

== Leader of Vojislav Šešelj's defense team ==
In May 2022, Vojislav Šešelj received a summons to appear before the International Residual Mechanism for Criminal Tribunals to respond to charges concerning the publication of classified information and the names of protected witnesses. An indictment was later filed against Šešelj and four other Radical Party officials in August 2023; Radeta was not included in the indictment.

Notwithstanding her own arrest warrant, Radeta was appointed as leader of Šešelj's defense team. In late February 2024, the presiding justice transferred the case against Šešelj and his co-defendants to Serbia. The matter is ongoing.

== Electoral record ==
=== Local (Belgrade) ===
2000 City Assembly of Belgrade election: Zemun Division 11
Candidate	Party
Vladan Janićijević (incumbent) (***WINNER***)	Democratic Opposition of Serbia (Affiliation: Democratic Party)
Dragan Lukić	Socialist Party of Serbia–Yugoslav Left
Ranko Milićević	Serbian Renewal Movement
Vjerica Maljković	Serbian Radical Party
Živan Selaković	Workers' Party of Yugoslavia
Dragan Simić	Citizens' Group
Total
