= Zoran Knežević (politician) =

Montenegrin politician (1948–2014)

- Зоран Кнежевић

Minister of Justice (FR Yugoslavia)
- In office 20 March 1997 – 12 August 1999
- Prime Minister: Radoje Kontić; Momir Bulatović
- Preceded by: Vladimir Krivokapić
- Succeeded by: Petar Jojić

Mayor of Podgorica
- In office January 1993 – late 1996
- Preceded by: Srđa Božović
- Succeeded by: Radivoje Rašović

Personal details
- Born: 13 February 1948 Montenegro, Yugoslavia
- Died: 12 September 2014 (aged 66) Belgrade, Serbia
- Education: University of Belgrade Faculty of Law

Zoran Knežević (Montenegrin Cyrillic: Зоран Кнежевић; 13 February 1948 – 12 September 2014) was a Montenegrin politician.

== Early life and education ==
Zoran Knežević was born on 13 February 1948. He graduated from the University of Belgrade Faculty of Law in 1971.

== Career ==
Knežević served as a judge in the Municipal Court, the Court of Collective Labor and presided over the District Commercial Court in Titograd. From 1989 to 1992, he served as the Vice President of the Titograd Municipality, and was the Mayor of Podgorica from January 1993 to late 1996.

Knežević was a member of the Main Board of the Democratic Party of Socialists, and became a founding member of the pro-Serbian Socialist People's Party when it was formed in 1998.

He was Justice Minister of the Federal Republic of Yugoslavia from 20 March 1997 to 12 August 1999 and a Member of Parliament of the Yugoslav Parliament's Chamber of Citizens 1999 until the election in 2000.

After the overthrow of Slobodan Milošević in October 2000, Knežević served as the editor of the Official Gazette of the Federal Republic of Yugoslavia until April 2003, after which he worked as lawyer in Belgrade.

== Death ==
He died in Belgrade on 12 September 2014 aged 66, and was buried in Staniseljići in Lješanska nahija on 15 September 2014.
