= Nikola Babić (politician) =

Bunjevac politician in Serbia (born 1942)

Nikola Babić (Serbian Cyrillic: Никола Бабић; born 1942) is a Serbian politician from the country's Bunjevac community. He was the first leader of Serbia's Bunjevac National Council, serving in the role from 2002 to 2010, and was later a council vice-president for most of the period from 2010 to 2022. He also served in the Vojvodina provincial assembly from 1992 to 1993 and the Subotica city assembly from 1996 to 2000. Babić was the leader of the Bunjevac-Šokac Party (BŠS) for several years but was expelled from the successor Bunjevac Party in 2005.

== Private career ==
Babić is a graduated engineer.

== Politician ==
=== Provincial representative ===
Babić was elected to the Vojvodina assembly for Subotica's sixth division in the May 1992 provincial election. He was the only member of the Bunjevac-Šokac Party to be elected; Ivan Vojnić Tunić, a member of the Socialist Party of Serbia (SPS), was also elected with a dual endorsement from the Socialists and the BŠS. The SPS and its allies won a landslide majority victory overall, due in part to a boycott by many of Serbia's leading opposition parties.

Due to ongoing skepticism about the legitimacy of the May 1992 elections, a new provincial election was called for December of the same year. Babić sought re-election in Subotica's sixth division and was defeated by Zvonimir Kiš. When the new assembly convened in early 1993, Babić's mandate ended. He later led the BŠS's electoral list for the Zrenjanin division in the 1993 Serbian parliamentary election; the list did not win any seats.

Babić became BŠS leader in 1994, succeeding Miroslav Vojnić Hajduk. He spoke against the Manifesto for an Autonomous Vojvodina in February 1996, saying, "We Bunjevac people are against the creation of a state within a state, because we expect that the constitutional and legal regulations of Serbia and Yugoslavia will provide us with the right to preserve our name and identity."

=== City representative ===
Babić was elected to the Subotica city assembly for the city's sixty-fifth division (Tavankut II) in the 1996 Serbian local elections. No single party or coalition won a majority of seats in the election; the governing Alliance of Vojvodina Hungarians (VMSZ) won the most seats but was required to share power with rival parties afterward.

The BŠS continued its affiliation with the Socialist Party of Serbia in the 1997 Serbian parliamentary election, and Babić appeared in the fifth position out of six on the SPS's coalition list in the restructured Subotica division. The list won two seats, and he was not given a mandate. (From 1992 to 2000, Serbia's electoral law stipulated that one-third of parliamentary mandates would be assigned to candidates from successful lists in numerical order, while the remaining two-thirds would be distributed amongst other candidates at the discretion of the sponsoring parties. Babić could have been given the SPS coalition's "optional" mandate for the division, but he was not.)

He sought re-election to the Subotica assembly in the 2000 Serbian local elections and was defeated by Branko Horvat of the Croatian National Alliance (HNS), who ran as part of the Democratic Opposition of Serbia (DOS) coalition.

=== Bunjevac community leader ===
==== President of the Bunjevac National Council ====
Serbia's Bunjevac National Council was established in 2002. Its members were initially chosen by an electoral college of community leaders; Babić was elected to the council and became its first president, serving in the role from 2002 to 2010. After the council was established, the Bunjevac-Šokac Party changed its name to the Bunjevac Party.

Serbia adopted a system of proportional representation for local elections after 2000. Notwithstanding that he was the party's leader, Babić appeared in only the sixteenth position on the Bunjevac Party's electoral list in the 2004 local election in Subotica. The list did not cross the electoral threshold to win assembly representation.

By 2005, Darko Babić had succeeded Nikola Babić as leader of the Bunjevac Party. In September 2005, Nikola Babić was expelled from the party. The officially stated reason was that the party disapproved of his decision to take part in the Dužijanac harvest ceremonies in his capacity as council president.

Although Babić does not appear to have been a member of any political party in the late 2000s, he contested the 2008 Serbian parliamentary election on the electoral list of Mirko Bajić's Alliance of Bačka Bunjevci (SBB), appearing the second position. The list did not cross the electoral threshold. In the concurrent 2008 local elections for the Subotica assembly, he did not participate in Bajić's coalition but instead led the electoral list of the Bunjevac Party of Vojvodina (BSV), a different organization from the Bunjevac Party. The list won a single mandate, which was not assigned to Babić but to party leader Branko Francišković. (In the 2008 local elections, all mandates were assigned to candidates on successful lists at the discretion of the sponsoring parties or coalitions, irrespective of numerical order.) The Bunjevac Party finished last in Subotica under Darko Babić's leadership and dissolved soon afterward.

Babić's last year as council president was dominated by a rivalry with the Bunjevac Information Centre, led by Suzana Kujundžić Ostojić. He was removed as president on somewhat technical grounds in January 2010. The Serbian government contended that the council had fallen below its required quorum in July 2009, when eight of the twenty-one council members resigned their seats. Babić objected to this decision, arguing that the council did not have a legally defined quorum and was still functioning as intended. Notwithstanding this, he ultimately agreed to stand down and cede power to a temporary authority.

==== Vice-President of the Bunjevac National Council ====
Serbia introduced direct elections for most national minority councils, including the Bunjevac National Council, in 2010. Babić fielded a list called "Bunjevci for Bunjevci" in that year's election and returned to council when the list won three seats. A broad coalition government took shape after the election, and Babić was appointed as council vice-president. He continued in this role after a coalition reshuffle in 2011.

A new political party called the Bunjevac Party was established in January 2012 and was officially registered with the Serbian government the following month. While it was not technically a successor to Babić's former party, there were some connections between the two organizations. Babić himself was a nominal candidate for the new party in the 2012 local election in Subotica, appearing in the tenth position on its list (by this time, Serbia's electoral laws had been reformed such that all mandates were assigned in numerical order). The list won one seat and afterward participated in the local government.

The Bunjevac National Council went through another period of instability in 2013. Under the terms of the 2010 coalition agreement, the presidency of the Bunjevac National Council was supposed to rotate between three different individuals in the 2010–14 term. After Branko Pokornić refused to resign the presidency as planned, Babić controversially convened a council meeting that removed Pokornić and chose Suzana Kujundžić Ostojić as his successor. Pokornić did not accept the decision as legitimate and insisted that he was still the president; the resulting standoff prevented the council from fulfilling its duties. Babić ended his council group's alliance with Mirko Bajić in this period and formed a new partnership with Kujundžić Ostojić. The Serbian government ultimately dissolved the council for a second time in August 2013, due to non-attendance of some members and the inability of the council to hold regular sessions. Babić was appointed to a temporary authority that governed the council pending new elections the following year.

Babić appeared in the second position on Kujundžić Ostojić's Bunjevci list in the 2014 council election and was re-elected when the list won four seats. The Bunjevci delegates took part in a new coalition government after the election, and Babić served for at least part of the term as a council vice-president.

For the 2018 Bunjevac council election, the leaders of several rival parties (including Kujundžić Ostojić, Bajić, and Babić) joined forces to create a list called Bunjevci Together. Babić appeared in the fourth position on the list and was easily re-elected to a fourth term when the list won a majority victory with thirteen mandates. He was appointed to another term as vice-president when the new council convened on 1 December 2018, served in this role for the term that followed, and was not a candidate in 2022.

=== Bunjevac national identity ===
Throughout his time as an elected official and community leader, Babić defended the existence of a Bunjevac national identity and rejected efforts to categorize Bunjevci as Croats. In 2002, he remarked that Bunjevci had been inaccurately categorized as Croats historically on account of their Catholic faith. He led the Bunjevac Language Standardization Committee in the 2010s and took part in the Bunjevac National Council's presentation of a standardized Bunjevac language in February 2018.

== Electoral record ==
=== Provincial (Vojvodina) ===
December 1992 Vojvodina provincial election: Subotica Division 6
Candidate	Party	Votes	%
Zvonimir Kiš	Reform Democratic Party of Vojvodina–Democratic Party–Doves of Subotica– League of Social Democrats of Vojvodina–Democratic Movement of Serbia (Affiliation: Reform Democratic Party of Vojvodina)		elected
Nikola Babić (incumbent)	Bunjevac-Šokac Party		
Julije Skenderović	Democratic Alliance of Croats in Vojvodina		
Total			
Source: Babić and Skenderović are listed alphabetically.

May 1992 Vojvodina provincial election: Subotica Division 6
Candidate	Party	Votes	%
Nikola Babić	Bunjevac-Šokac Party		elected in the second round
Bela Tonković	Democratic Alliance of Croats in Vojvodina		defeated in the second round
Mirko Bajić	Civic Movement for Subotica – Doves of Subotica		
Stevan Bošnjak	Socialist Party of Serbia		
Sándor Kalmár	Citizens' Group		
Dr. Sava Lutkić	Yugoslavian Party		
Total			
Source: All candidates except Babić and Tonković are listed alphabetically.

=== Local (Subotica) ===
2000 Subotica city election: Division 65 (Tavankut 2)
Candidate	Party	Votes	%
Branko Horvat	Democratic Opposition of Serbia (Affiliation: Croatian National Alliance)		elected
Nikola Babić (incumbent)	Bunjevac-Šokac Party		
Ivica Ivkov	Serbian Radical Party		
Total			
Source: Babić and Ivkov are listed alphabetically.

1996 Subotica city election: Division 65 (Tavankut 2)
Candidate	Party	Votes	%
Nikola Babić	Bunjevac-Šokac Party		elected in the first round
Pero Benčik (incumbent)	Democratic Alliance of Croats in Vojvodina		defeated in the first round
Total			
