= Jonjić =

Jonjić is a Croatian surname. Notable people with the surname include:

- Matej Jonjić (born 1991), Croatian football player
- Antonio Jonjić (born 1999), German-Croatian football player

== See also ==
- Jojić
