= Mirko Ostrogonac =

Serbian politician

Member of the National Assembly
- Incumbent
- Assumed office 26 October 2022
- Preceded by: Tomislav Žigmanov

Personal details
- Born: 1951 (age 74–75) Mala Bosna, AP Vojvodina, PR Serbia, FPR Yugoslavia
- Party: DSHV
- Education: University of Novi Sad

Mirko Ostrogonac (Serbian Cyrillic: Мирко Острогонац; born 1951) is a Serbian politician and agronomy engineer serving as a member of the National Assembly since 26 October 2022. An ethnic Croat, he is a high-ranking member of the Democratic Alliance of Croats in Vojvodina (DSHV).

== Early life and career ==
Ostrogonac was born in 1951 in Mala Bosna, AP Vojvodina, PR Serbia, FPR Yugoslavia. In 1975, he graduated from the Faculty of Agriculture, University of Novi Sad. Following graduation and completion of mandatory military service, Ostrogonac started working in Agrokombinat Subotica, where he performed various positions. Later he started working for Agros-zavod Subotica. From 2000 to 2004, he served in the executive board of the Municipality of Subotica for the department of agriculture. Until his retirement in 2016, he was an employee of the City Administration of Subotica.

Ostrogonac is a member of the Democratic Alliance of Croats in Vojvodina (DSHV) and the president of its branch in Subotica. Following the resignation of DSHV president Tomislav Žigmanov from the National Assembly and his appointment as a government minister, Ostrogonac replaced him as MP on 26 October 2022.
