= Bunjevac-Šokac Party (Serbia, 1991) =

Political party in Serbia

The Bunjevac-Šokac Party (Serbian: Буњевачко Шокачка странка, romanized: Bunjevačko Šokačka stranka; abbr. BŠS) was a political party in Serbia representing the Bunjevac national minority community. Founded in 1991, the party won representation in the Vojvodina provincial assembly in the May 1992 provincial election and also had a presence in the Subotica city assembly from 1992 to 2000. The BŠS's leader for most of its existence was Nikola Babić.

After the formation of Serbia's Bunjevac National Council in 2002, the party changed its name to the Bunjevac Party (Serbian: Буњевачка странка, romanized: Bunjevačka stranka; abbr. BS). It ceased to exist after 2008. A successor "Bunjevac Party" was established in 2012 and is still listed on the Serbian registry of political parties as of 2025.

Although the party established in 1991 claimed to be a successor to the historical Bunjevac-Šokac Party, it should not be confused with that organization. It should also not be confused with the Croatian Bunjevac-Šokac Party, a completely different organization that represented Serbia's Croat national minority. The renamed Bunjevac Party of 2002, similarly, should not be confused with the Bunjevac Party of Vojvodina founded in 2008.

== History ==
=== Formation ===
The Bunjevac–Šokac Party was founded in Vojvodina on 24 March 1991, shortly before the breakup of the Socialist Federal Republic of Yugoslavia and the beginning of the Yugoslav Wars. Nikola Čakić, the chairman of the BŠS's initiative committee, said that the party's main aim was to preserve the national identity of the Bunjevac and Šokac people. He added that this goal could be best achieved in a united Yugoslavia, with the Bunjevac and Šokac population living in peace and friendship with other national communities. He encouraged Bunjevci to declare their national identity in Yugoslavia's upcoming census. Most of the party's members were from Subotica.

The party's leader in its early years was Miroslav Vojnić Hajduk.

=== Elections in 1992 ===
Two candidates endorsed by the BŠS were elected to the Vojvodina assembly in the May 1992 provincial election: Nikola Babić and Ivan Vojnić Tunić, a member of the Socialist Party of Serbia who held a dual endorsement from that party and the BŠS. Both were elected for constituencies in Subotica. The SPS won a majority victory overall, due in part to a boycott by many of Serbia's leading opposition parties, and Vojnić Tunić served afterward as a vice-president of the assembly.

Three BŠS candidates were also elected to the Subotica city assembly in the concurrent May 1992 Serbian local elections: Antun Stanković, Mirko Nimčević, and Ivan Bogešić. The Democratic Fellowship of Vojvodina Hungarians (VMDK) won the city election and afterward formed a coalition government with the Democratic Alliance of Croats in Vojvodina (DSHV).

Due to ongoing doubts about the legitimacy of the May 1992 elections, new provincial and local elections were held in December 1992. Babić was defeated in his bid for re-election to the provincial assembly, and no other candidates endorsed by the party were elected. (Vojnić Tunić was re-elected, but his endorsement was only from the SPS on this occasion.)

The BŠS contested the December 1992 local elections in Subotica in an alliance with the Party of Yugoslavs. Three of the alliance's candidates were elected, two of whom were members of the BŠS: Stanković and Bogešić. The VMDK–DSHV alliance won an increased victory overall in the city.

=== Subsequent activities ===
The BŠS never won another seat at the provincial level after 1992. Miroslav Vojnić Hajduk stood down as party leader in 1994 and was succeeded by Nikola Babić. Babić was elected to the Subotica city assembly in the 1996 Serbian local elections, but no other party candidates were successful on this occasion.

The party contested the 1997 Serbian parliamentary election in affiliation with the Socialist Party of Serbia's electoral alliance, and Babić appeared in the fifth position (out of six) on the SPS's coalition list in Subotica. The list won two seats, and he did not receive a parliamentary mandate.

The BŠS fielded two candidates in the 2000 local elections in Subotica: Babić and Nikola Vizen. Neither was elected.

Serbia's Bunjevac National Council was established in 2002, (Note: It was formally known as the Bunjevac National Council of Serbia and Montenegro until 2006.) and its members were initially chosen by an electoral college of community leaders. Babić was elected to the council and became its first president, serving in the role from 2002 to 2010.

Serbia adopted a system of proportional representation for local elections after 2000. The BŠS, now renamed as the Bunjevac Party, contested the 2004 local elections in Subotica under the new system and fell below the electoral threshold.

By 2005, Darko Babić had succeeded Nikola Babić as party leader. In September 2005, Nikola Babić was expelled from the party. The officially stated reason for this decision was that the party disapproved of Babić's decision to take part in the Dužijanac harvest ceremonies in his capacity as chair of the Bunjevac National Council.

The Bunjevac Party, under Darko Babić's leadership, contested the 2008 local election in Subotica and fared poorly, receiving less than one per cent of the vote. The party seems to have dissolved soon after this time; an article published in Nova srpska politička misao in 2010 indicates that it no longer existed.

=== Re-establishment of the Bunjevac Party in 2012 ===
A new political party called the Bunjevac Party was established in January 2012 and was officially registered with the Serbian government the following month. The party won a single seat in the 2012 local election in Subotica and afterward participated in a coalition government in the city. Although it was not the same organization, it had some connections to the BŠS's legacy; Nikola Babić was one of the party's candidates.

The Bunjevac Party has not fielded a slate of candidates in any local election since 2012, but it is still listed on the state registry of parties as of 2025.
