= Croatian Syrmian Initiative =

Croatian Syrmian Initiative Hrvatska srijemska inicijativa Хрватска сријемска иницијатива
- Abbreviation: HSI
- Leader: Andrej Španović
- Founded: February 5, 2008
- Dissolved: 2011
- Headquarters: Svetog Dimitrija 24, Sremska Mitrovica
- Ideology: Croat minority interests in Vojvodina
- Colours: Brown

Croatian Syrmian Initiative (Croatian: Hrvatska srijemska inicijativa, Serbian Cyrillic: Хрватска сријемска иницијатива, romanized: Hrvatska srijemska inicijativa, HSI) was a political party in Serbia representing the Croat ethnic minority in Srem, Vojvodina.

== History ==
It was founded on February 5, 2008. Its most recent president was Ante Španović. The party's seat was in Sremska Mitrovica.

Unlike other Croat parties from Vojvodina, HSI has had good relations with the Democratic Alliance of Croats in Vojvodina. In 2009 HSI negotiated with DSHV. It was planned that HSI and DSHV would unite on June 5, 2009 at a meeting in Sremska Mitrovica.

In the local elections in Serbia in 2008, Croatian Syrmian Initiative had one member on the Democratic Party's ballot, winning one mandate in Sremska Mitrovica.
