= Tomislav Žigmanov =

Serbian politician (born 1967)

- Томислав Жигманов
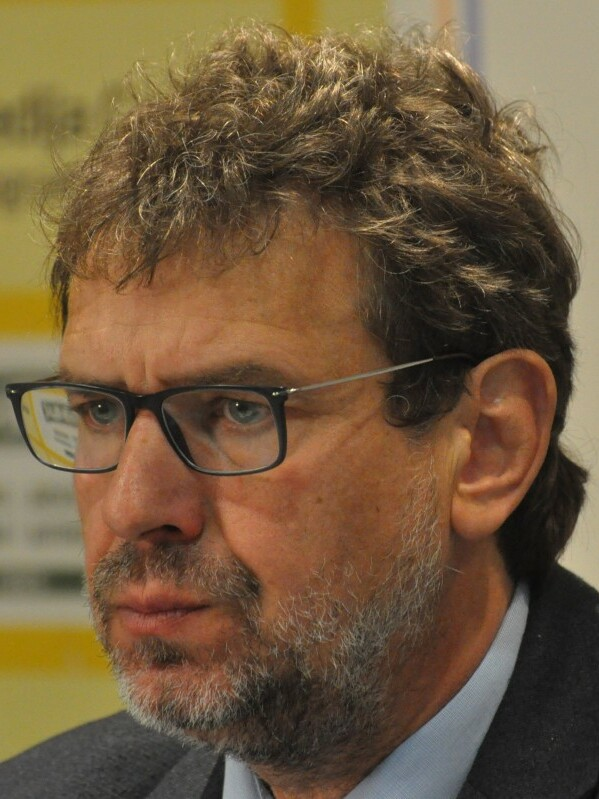
- Žigmanov in 2018

Minister of Human and Minority Rights and Social Dialogue
- In office 26 October 2022 – 16 April 2025
- Prime Minister: Ana Brnabić; Ivica Dačić (acting); Miloš Vučević
- Preceded by: Gordana Čomić
- Succeeded by: Demo Beriša

Leader of the Democratic Alliance of Croats in Vojvodina
- Incumbent
- Assumed office 30 October 2015
- Preceded by: Petar Kuntić

Member of the National Assembly of the Republic of Serbia
- In office 1 August 2022 – 25 October 2022
- In office 24 April 2016 – 3 August 2020

Personal details
- Born: 12 April 1967 (age 59) Donji Tavankut, SAP Vojvodina, SR Serbia, SFR Yugoslavia
- Party: DSHV
- Parents: Kalman Žigmanov; Ružica Mačković
- Education: University of Novi Sad
- Occupation: author, professor, politician

Tomislav Žigmanov (Serbian Cyrillic: Томислав Жигманов; born 12 April 1967) is a Serbian author, community leader, and politician from the country's Croat community. He has led the Democratic Alliance of Croats in Vojvodina (DSHV) since 2015 and was Serbia's minister of human and minority rights and social dialogue from 2022 to 2025.

== Early life, private career, and community activism ==
Žigmanov was born in the village of Donji Tavankut in what was then the Socialist Autonomous Province of Vojvodina in the Socialist Republic of Serbia, Socialist Federal Republic of Yugoslavia. He was raised in that community and in nearby Subotica, where he now lives. He is a graduate at the University of Novi Sad Faculty of Philosophy and has taught the history of philosophy at the Theological and Catechetical Institute of the Diocese of Subotica.

Žigmanov became politically active during the Yugoslav Wars following the break-up of Yugoslavia. He was a co-founder of the magazine Žig, which he edited from 1996 to 1998, and worked at Radio Subotica from 1998 until 2002.

In September 2002, he said that Croat institutions in Vojvodina were operating under "very unfavourable conditions," notwithstanding that relations with the Serbian state had improved significantly since the fall of Slobodan Milošević's government two years later. He added that initiatives from within Vojvodina's Croat community itself were often undertaken "without consensus or agreement."

Žigmanov launched the Croatian language paper Hrvatska riječ in January 2003 at the Vojvodina provincial assembly in a public ceremony attended by several Vojvodina politicians and Croatian delegates. He said on the occasion, "We can now again write about social reality and position of Croats in Vojvodina in a truthful and professional manner and in our own tongue." He welcomed the indictment of Serbian Radical Party (SRS) leader Vojislav Šešelj by the International Criminal Tribunal for the former Yugoslavia (ICTY) the following month, saying that he hoped it would provide consolation to those who suffered from the actions of Šešelj and his followers in the 1990s.

In January 2004, Žigmanov appeared on the television program TV divani on Television Novi Sad and, among other things, implicated the parent Radio Television of Serbia network in recent anti-Croat incidents in Vojvodina. The station refused to run this episode of the program, leading to a dispute between the show's producers and station management. Later in the year, he co-authored a report on the status of ethnic Croats in Serbia for the Helsinki Committee for Human Rights in Serbia. The report stated that "Croats in Vojvodina are not sufficiently involved in decision-making processes, and they are poorly represented in public and state administration, notably in the police, the army, the judiciary, customs administration and state-run companies."

In 2007, Žigmanov won the Zvane Črnja Award for his book Minimum in maximis – zapisi s ruba o nerubnome.

He criticised the entry of the Socialist Party of Serbia (SPS) into Vojvodina's coalition government after the 2008 provincial election, saying that without a "radical renunciation" by SPS leaders of the party's activities in the 1990s its presence would be a "poke in the eye to people who suffered under the Milošević regime."

In January 2009, Žigmanov became the inaugural director of the Institute for the Culture of Vojvodina Croats. He was also appointed in July 2011 as the head of a committee to monitor anti-Croat incidents in the province; he indicated that its mandate would include monitoring hate speech directed against the Catholic Church. He later sponsored a comprehensive research project on crimes committed against Vojvodina Croats in the Yugoslav Wars.

Žigmanov frequently criticised the government of Croatia during these years for paying insufficient attention to the concerns of Croats in Serbia. He welcomed Croatia's accession to the European Union (EU) in 2013, although he criticised the Croatian government's decision not to invite any representatives of Vojvodina's Croat community to the ceremony.

In January 2014, he was one of three Croat leaders in Vojvodina to meet with Serbian president Tomislav Nikolić for discussions on the status of Croats in the province.

After the ICTY's decision to temporarily release Vojislav Šešelj on health grounds in 2014, Žigmanov said that Croats in Vojvodina had "justified and understandable reasons to be worried" about the Radical Party leader's sudden return to Serbia. Žigmanov specifically accused Šešelj of having triggered the persecution of Croats in the Srem District in the Yugoslav Wars. On another occasion, he said that twenty-five Croats had been killed in the Srem and South Bačka Districts during the Yugoslav Wars and that more than thirty thousand people were expelled or forced to leave their homes, although he added that these crimes took place under state auspices and that Šešelj was not exclusively responsible.

In March 2015, the mayor of Subotica banned the promotion of two critical books on the origins of the Bunjevci community at city hall on the grounds that their presentation would be political in nature. Žigmanov and fellow Vojvodina Croat leader Slaven Bačić strongly criticised this decision as discriminatory. A report in the Croatian media described Žigmanov and Bačić as speculating that Croats in the city could be forced to wear special badges in the future.

== Politician ==
=== Early years ===
Žigmanov was the information secretary of Serbia's Croatian National Council in the early 2000s. He criticised the governing Democratic Party (DS) for participating in the council's 2010 elections, which he said were intended to be reserved for Croat institutions and organisations.

He co-operated with the DSHV for many years before becoming the party's leader, although he was often critical of the party's decisions. He opposed the DSHV's endorsement of the Croatian Democratic Union (HDZ) in the 2007 Croatian parliamentary election and said that it would be better for Croats in Serbia if the rival Social Democratic Party (SDP) formed government. This notwithstanding, he joined with the DSHV in welcoming the election of HDZ candidate Kolinda Grabar-Kitarović as president of Croatia in 2015, on the grounds that she had promised to devote more time to the concerns of Vojvodina Croats.

Žigmanov was elected without opposition as DSHV president on 30 October 2015. In his acceptance speech, he said that he would fight for reserved seats for Croats in the assemblies of Serbia and Vojvodina, and for Croatian language and literature departments in Serbia's universities.

=== First parliamentary term ===
The DSHV contested the 2016 Serbian parliamentary election on the electoral list of the Democratic Party. Going into the campaign, Žigmanov said that the party expected to win one seat in the new parliament. This predication was accurate: Žigmanov received the sixteenth position on the list and was elected when it won exactly sixteen mandates. The Serbian Progressive Party (SNS) and its allies won a majority victory, and Žigmanov served in opposition as a member in the Democratic Party's parliamentary group for the term that followed.

In December 2016, Žigmanov said that Serbia should publish 186 textbooks in Croatian at all levels of education to fulfill its educational and cultural requirements to join the European Union; he added that this would be the best way of overturning Croatia's recently imposed blockade on Chapter 26 (Education and Culture) in Serbia's EU entry talks. He later welcomed both Serbia's decision to print Croatian textbooks at the primary school level and Croatia's overturning of the block.

In early 2017, Vesna Prćić, at the time the DSHV's sole delegate in Vojvodina provincial assembly, said that she believed the party should support SNS leader Aleksandar Vučić in the 2017 Serbian presidential election. Žigmanov indicated his surprise at this statement and said he was certain the party would not follow the recommendation. The DSHV ultimately decided against supporting any candidate. Notwithstanding this, the party had a complicated relationship with Vučić and his administration in this period. Although the DSHV continued to serve in opposition, it congratulated Vučić after his victory in the presidential contest and welcomed Croatian president Grabar-Kitarović's presence at his inauguration as marking a step toward the normalisation of relations between the countries. Žigmanov also welcomed Vučić's state visit to Croatia in February 2018 and was himself included in the president's delegation. Shortly thereafter, Vučić took part in formal talks with Žigmanov and other leading members of Serbia's Croat community; Žigmanov later credited these discussions for an agreement to increase the number of Croatian sections in Subotica's secondary schools.

In late 2017, Žigmanov drew attention to an incident in which three ethnic Croats in Sonta had been attacked as they were leaving a café. He described the incident as an ethnically motivated hate crime. The police disagreed with this assessment, saying they had interviewed several witnesses and did not find evidence that the fight was motivated by ethnicity. President Vučić subsequently endorsed the police's conclusions, while Croatia called for further investigations. Žigmanov accused the Serbian state of denying that Croats could be targeted as Croats for violence.

Žigmanov opposed a bill to reform Serbia's national minority councils in June 2018, arguing that it would reduce their autonomy. He particularly opposed a section of the bill that prevented leaders of national minority parties from holding leadership positions on the councils.

During his first parliamentary term, Žigmanov was a member of the labour committee, (Note: Formally known as the Committee on Labour, Social Issues, Social Inclusion, and Poverty Reduction.) a deputy member of the committee on human and minority rights and gender equality, a member of a working group for national minority rights, and a member of the parliamentary friendship groups with Albania, Bosnia and Herzegovina, Croatia, the Holy See, and Poland.

==== Response to ICTY and MICT verdicts ====
The 2016 Serbian election saw the return to parliament of Radical Party leader Vojislav Šešelj after an absence of thirteen years, most of which he had spent in The Hague on trial for war crimes. During the election campaign, the ICTY unexpectedly acquitted Šešelj of all charges against him. Žigmanov described this as an "unpleasant surprise" for Vojvodina Croats, saying, "We know what we went through and that is why Šešelj's acquittal is so difficult for us."

The Mechanism for International Criminal Tribunals (MICT), a successor body to the ICTY, subsequently overturned part of Šešelj's acquittal in April 2018 and found him criminally responsible for the persecution and deportation of Croats by virtue of an inflammatory speech he had delivered in Hrtkovci on 6 May 1992, in which he called for Croats to leave the area. The Radical Party leader was sentenced to ten years in prison, although he was not required to serve any time as he had already spent more than eleven years in custody during the trial period. Žigmanov hailed the verdict as the first time an international court recognised crimes committed against Croats in Vojvodina during the Yugoslav Wars and added, "we could say that a little justice has been served."

Following his conviction, Šešelj said that he was "proud" of his actions in 1992 and was "preparing intensively to commit again my war crimes, [starting] with Tomislav Žigmanov and Nenad Čanak." Žigmanov described these comments as "unacceptable" and reminiscent of the climate of Serbian politics in the 1990s. The Croatian government also condemned Šešelj's statements and urged Serbia to take legal action against him. In the absence of an official response from the Serbian government, Žigmanov withdrew from a scheduled appearance with other parliamentarians in welcoming Gordan Jandroković, the speaker of the Croatian parliament, to the Serbian assembly. Jandroković referenced this controversy during his visit, saying, "statements that could be heard in recent days, which have negative connotations for the Croat minority in Serbia, are unacceptable to us," though he added that he was confident all issues pertaining to the rights of Croats in Serbia could be successfully resolved. (Jandroković's trip was cut short after an incident on the assembly grounds in which Šešelj trampled on the Croatian flag and cursed at both Jandranković and Žigmanov.)

Žigmanov warned that anti-Croat sentiments were rising in the aftermath of these incidents. He welcomed a decision by Serbian police to prevent the Radical Party from holding a rally in Hrtkovci on the anniversary of Šešelj's 1992 speech, though he added, "the reason why this is happening, the downplaying of events from the 1990s in which Croats were the victims [...] hasn't disappeared."

Šešelj subsequently purchased a house in Hrtkovci, an act that the Serbian media identified as an obvious provocation against the Croat community. Žigmanov told Blic, "his return to the place of suffering of Croats is not only frightful but it largely trivializes the war crimes, which causes disquiet among the local Croats." In response to this statement, senior Radical Party official and parliamentarian Vjerica Radeta again insulted Žigmanov, calling him an Ustasha.

=== Departure from and return to the assembly ===
In November 2019, Žigmanov brought the DSHV into an alliance called the Vojvodina Front, which also included the League of Social Democrats of Vojvodina (LSV) and Vojvodina's Party (VP). This alliance contested the 2020 Serbian parliamentary election as part of United Democratic Serbia (UDS), an opposition coalition led by Serbia 21. Žigmanov appeared in the sixth position on the UDS electoral list.

UDS's decision to participate in the 2020 election was controversial, as most leading opposition parties chose to boycott the vote on the grounds that it was neither free nor fair. Some opposition figures accused Serbia 21, in particular, of legitimizing the SNS administration by its participation in the election; Boris Tadić described the party as a "project" of SNS leader and Serbian president Aleksandar Vučić, a charge that its leaders denied. In any event, the UDS list fell below the electoral threshold, and Žigmanov was not re-elected.

Žigmanov also appeared in the sixty-second position on the Vojvodina Front's list in the 2020 Vojvodina provincial election, which took place concurrently with the parliamentary vote. Election from this position was not a realistic prospect, and he was not elected when the list won six seats.

The DSHV later participated in the 2022 parliamentary election as part of an alliance called Together for Vojvodina–Vojvodinians. Žigmanov led the alliance's list and was elected to a second parliamentary term when the list won two mandates. When the assembly convened, he became a deputy member of the environmental protection committee and the committee on human and minority rights and gender equality. The Serbian Progressive Party won a plurality victory with 120 seats out of 250 and remained the dominant party in Serbia's government.

In August 2022, Žigmanov and Milorad Pupovac signed a declaration on cooperation between Croats in Serbia and Serbs in Croatia.

=== Member of the Subotica city assembly ===
Žigmanov received the second position on the Democratic Party's coalition list for the Subotica city assembly in the 2016 Serbian local elections and was elected when the list won seven mandates. The SNS and its allies won the election and the DS served afterward in opposition. Žigmanov was an assembly member for the full term that followed.

He led the Vojvodina Front's list for Subotica in the 2020 local elections and was re-elected when the list won three seats. He resigned on 3 November 2022 after being appointed to cabinet.

=== Cabinet minister ===
After the 2022 election, Žigmanov and the DSHV entered into discussions with Aleksandar Vučić about possible participation in government. In October 2022, Žigmanov was announced as Serbia's new minister for human and minority rights and social dialogue. The newspaper Danas described Žigmanov's presence as one of the greatest surprises in the new ministry. Žigmanov, for his part, said that would work to better integrate Serbia's Croat community and would seek to improve strained diplomatic relations between Croatia and Serbia. He welcomed a meeting between Vučić and Croatian prime minister Andrej Plenković at the January 2023 World Economic Forum and himself held a meeting with Plenković in December 2023 on improving the status of Croats in Serbia.

Žigmanov signed an agreement in February 2023 with Čupi Redžepali, the director of the Roma Education Fund, to give state internship positions to young members of Serbia's Roma community. He remarked later in the year that discrimination against the Roma community, while still present in Serbia, had diminished due to institutional measures such as these.

In May 2023, Žigmanov presented Serbia's national report before the United Nations Human Rights Council, drawing attention to discrimination against Serbs and other non-Albanian communities in Kosovo.

He oversaw a campaign called Stop Femicide! in December 2023, and his ministry ran a sixteen-day activism campaign against violence against women, with the start and end dates corresponding to the International Day for the Elimination of Violence against Women and Human Rights Day.

The DSHV formed an alliance with the Bosniak Justice and Reconciliation Party (SPP) for the 2023 parliamentary election, and Žigmanov appeared in the eleventh position on their combined list, too low for direct election to be a realistic prospect. The list won two seats, both of which went to SPP candidates. Žigmanov also led a DSHV–SPP list in the concurrent 2023 Vojvodina provincial election. The list did not win any mandates.

The Serbian Progressive Party won a majority victory in the 2023 parliamentary election and afterward formed a new coalition government with many of the same partners as in the previous ministry. Žigmanov was appointed for a second term as minister of human and minority rights and social dialogue.

In September 2024, Žigmanov said that his ministry had prepared a draft law on the recognition of same-sex relationships in Serbia, which he described as informed by human rights standards. He added that it would be up to the assembly to approve it.
