= Jovo Ostojić =

Serbian politician

Jovo Ostojić (Serbian Cyrillic: Јово Остојић; 1952 – 29 June 2017) was a politician and paramilitary leader in Serbia. He served two terms in the National Assembly of Serbia as a member of the far-right Serbian Radical Party.

== Early life and career ==
Ostojić was born in Apatin, Autonomous Province of Vojvodina, in what was then the People's Republic of Serbia in the Federal People's Republic of Yugoslavia. He was a construction technician in private life and lived in the village of Prigrevica (near Apatin).

== Paramilitary leader ==
Radical Party leader Vojislav Šešelj has said that Ostojić was involved in the formation, training, and oversight of "volunteer squads" of Serb paramilitaries in the early period of the 1991–95 war in Croatia, using his base in Prigrevica as a training centre. He saw action in Croatia during the conflict. Šešelj appointed him as a Chetnik voivode on 13 May 1993.

== Politician ==
=== During the Yugoslav Wars of the 1990s ===
Ostojić was a Radical Party candidate in the May 1992 Yugoslavian parliamentary election, running in the single-member division of Sombor. He was defeated by Milorad Vlahović of the Socialist Party of Serbia.

He received the seventh position on the Radical Party's electoral list for Novi Sad in the 1992 Serbian parliamentary election. The party won ten mandates in the division, and Ostojić was subsequently included in its assembly delegation. (From 1992 to 2000, Serbia's electoral law stipulated that one-third of parliamentary mandates would be assigned to candidates from successful lists in numerical order, while the remaining two-thirds would be distributed amongst other candidates on the lists by the sponsoring parties. It was common practice for the latter mandates to be awarded out of numerical order. Ostojić's position on the list did not give him the automatic right to a mandate, but he was nonetheless included in the party's delegation and took his seat when parliament met in early 1993.) The governing Socialist Party of Serbia won the largest number of seats in this election, but with 101 mandates out of 250 fell short of a majority; the Radicals finished in second place with seventy-three seats. Although the Radicals were technically an opposition party in the sitting of the assembly that followed, they initially worked with the Socialists in an informal coalition. By late 1993, however, the two parties had turned against each other and new elections were called.

Ostojić was promoted to the fourth position on the Radical Party's list for Novi Sad in the 1993 parliamentary election. The party won seven seats in the division. Ostojić did not receive an automatic mandate and was not included in his party's delegation for the parliament that followed.

=== Warrant for arrest and return to the National Assembly ===
Ostojić later left the Radical Party. He sought election to the Assembly of Vojvodina in a 2013 by-election with a Citizens' Group called the Movement for Vojvodina and finished seventh in a field of eight candidates.

In January 2015, Ostojić and two other members of the Radical Party (Petar Jojić and Vjerica Radeta) were charged with contempt of court by the International Criminal Tribunal for the former Yugoslavia (ICTY) for having allegedly "threatened, intimidated, offered bribes to, or otherwise interfered with" witnesses in the trial of party leader Vojislav Šešelj. Ostojić was specifically accused of having assisted Jojić in dictating a statement for a prosecution witness that was untruthful "in that it contained false allegations against the prosecution and misrepresented the role and responsibilities of Šešelj during the war."

The three accused declined to go to The Hague to face the charges. In an interview from this period, Ostojić said that he had previously been detained in Belgrade for five days in 2002 and "harassed" by an ICTY prosecutor. In Ostojić's accounting of events, the prosecutor sought to persuade him to make false statements about Šešelj and Slobodan Milošević at the tribunal, at one point offering him money. (The article in which this interview appeared described Ostojić as living in "extreme poverty" with his family in Prigrevica and noted that he had not been active with the Radical Party in several years. It also indicated that he had become an amateur historian and had written extensively on the military history of Kupres in World War II).

Against the backdrop of the arrest warrant, Ostojić became active with the Radical Party again and received the twentieth position on its electoral list in the 2016 Serbian parliamentary election. By this time, the entire country had been restructured as a single electoral division and all mandates were awarded to candidates on successful lists in numerical order. The party won twenty-two mandates, and Ostojić was accordingly elected to a second term in the national assembly. The election was won by the Serbian Progressive Party and its allies, and the Radicals again served in opposition.

A Serbian court subsequently ruled that the country was not obligated to extradite the three accused; the ruling indicated that Serbian law only requires the extradition of persons accused of serious offences such as war crimes, not those accused of contempt of court or other comparatively minor crimes. The ICTY continued to demand that the accused be extradited, arguing that Serbia's existing legislation could not be used as an excuse for non-compliance and urging the country to change its legislation to comply with the arrest warrants. Foreign affairs minister Ivica Dačić responded in August 2016 that Serbia's law on extraditions had been adopted by the Serbian parliament in cooperation with international agencies, that no objections were raised at the time, and that the tribunal had no authority to propose changes.

In March 2017, Interpol issued high-priority red notices for the arrests of Ostojić and his two colleagues. Rasim Ljajić, a deputy prime minister of Serbia, responded by stating that, "There is a Serbian court ruling that they will not be surrendered. There is no legal ground for this, and we have to respect the conclusions of the independent judicial authorities." Ostojić died before the matter was resolved.

== Death ==
Ostojić died on 29 June 2017 after a short illness.

== Electoral record ==
=== Provincial ===
2013 Assembly of Vojvodina by-election Apatin (constituency seat) - First and Second Rounds
Dragan Rastović	Socialist Party of Serbia–Party of United Pensioners of Serbia–United Serbia–Social Democratic Party of Serbia	4,221	32.40	6,569	59.66
Bruno Urbanovski	Choice for a Better Vojvodina	3,188	24.47	4,442	40.34
Dušan Paskaš	Serbian Progressive Party	2,644	20.30		
János Csíkos	Alliance of Vojvodina Hungarians	1,017	7.81		
Perica Popić	Serbian Radical Party	949	7.29		
Slobodan Bačić	Citizen's Group – Slobodan Bačić - United for Apatin	443	3.40		
Jovo Ostojić	Citizens' Group – Movement for Vojvodina	294	2.26		
Mirko Praštalo	Democratic Party of Serbia	270	2.08		
Total valid votes		13,026	100	11,011	100

=== Federal (Federal Republic of Yugoslavia) ===
May 1992 Yugoslavian Federal Election Chamber of Citizens: Sombor
Milorad Vlahović	Socialist Party of Serbia	23,511	27.48
Jovo Ostojić	Serbian Radical Party	21,713	25.38
Stojan Berber	Serb Democratic Party of Serbia	13,890	16.24
Ištvan Kabok	Democratic Fellowship of Vojvodina Hungarians	8,675	10.14
Živorad Smiljanić	League of Communists – Movement for Yugoslavia	6,079	7.11
Dušan Radusin	Workers' Party of Yugoslavia	3,001	3.51
Rajko Kelić	Citizens' Group	2,316	2.71
Milovan Nikolić	Citizens' Group	1,810	2.12
Nenad Mitrović	Citizens' Group	1,748	2.04
Slavica Haler	Citizens' Group	1,685	1.97
Srđan Mihailović	Citizens' Group	1,115	1.30
Total valid votes		85,543	100
