= Tibor Várady =

Serbian legal scholar

Minister of Justice
- In office July 1992 – December 1992
- Prime Minister: Milan Panić
- Preceded by: Office created
- Succeeded by: Zoran Stojanović

Personal details
- Born: 25 May 1939 (age 87) Petrovgrad, Kingdom of Yugoslavia (now Zrenjanin, Serbia)
- Citizenship: Serbian
- Education: University of Belgrade J.D, L.L.M. Harvard University S.J.D

Tibor Várady (born May 25, 1939, Petrovgrad) is a legal scholar.

He has also earned recognition as a writer. He was one of the founders of the Hungarian language avant-garde literary magazine "Új Symposion" published in Novi Sad (Yugoslavia) that was challenging political confines. Between 1969 and 1971 he was managing editor, and in November 1971 he defended the magazine in court proceedings aiming to ban the Új Symposion.

He received his law degree at the University of Belgrade Faculty of Law, and he received an S.J.D. at Harvard Law School.

Between July 1992 and December 1992 he was Minister of Justice of the Federal Republic of Yugoslavia in the government of Milan Panić. After Mr. Panić lost the elections against Milošević in December 1992, Tibor Várady started teaching in the U.S. and in Hungary. He kept ties with FR Yugoslavia, later Serbia, particularly after the fall of Milošević, and remained an active member of the Serbian Academy of Sciences and Arts (SANU).

== Academic career ==
Várady taught at the University of Novi Sad Faculty of Law since 1963 until December 1992. Since 1993 he has been teaching at the Central European University in Budapest. Also, for more than 20 years he was teaching one semester almost each year at U.S. law schools, alternating between the University of Florida, Berkeley, Cornell and Emory. In 1998 he became a tenured professor of law at Emory University, and was teaching at Emory one semester each year until 2012. He became Professor Emeritus of Law at Emory University in 2012. He became Professor Emeritus at the Central European University in 2015.

He gave more than 200 individual lectures or short courses in different countries including the United States, France, United Kingdom, Germany, The Netherlands, Austria, Belgium, Italy, Spain, Hungary, Serbia, Croatia, Bosnia and Herzegovina, the Czech Republic, Slovakia, Slovenia, Poland, Singapore, China.

== Awards and honors ==
Tibor Várady is a regular member of the Serbian Academy of Sciences and Arts. He also a member of a number of professional associations, including the International Law Association, Société de la Legislation comparée, Society of European Contract Law (Secola)

His professional awards include:

- the title "Knight of the Profession" received in Belgrade, 2007
- a Liber Amicorum (Resolving International Conflicts) published on the occasion of his 70th birthday (Budapest CEU Press 2009)
- the Deák Ferenc Prize for research, awarded by the Pro Renovanda Cultura Hungariae Foundation in Budapest, 2010
- Award of the City of Zrenjanin, 2016
- Civis Academicus Honoris Causa Prize awarded by the Faculty of Law of Szeged University 2019
- Laureautus Academiae given by the Hungarian Academy of Sciences 2019

His literary awards include:

- Literary award "Stražilovo" 1978
- Literary award "Szenteleky" 2018
- Literary award "Szirmai" 2022

== Legal practice ==
From 2001 until 2008, he acted as agent counsel and advocate in 10 cases before the International Court of Justice. He has been active in international commercial arbitration since 1973. Acted as arbitrator or chairman of panels of arbitrators in more than 200 (mostly international) cases administered by arbitral institutions in Austria, Croatia, England, Egypt, France, Hungary, The Netherlands, Serbia, Switzerland. He has also been active in ad hoc arbitrations.

In 2021 Várady stated that Kosovo's declaration of independence was illegal.

== Professional publications ==
Várady is the author or co-author of 20 books. He also published 75 articles in English, French, or German, 100 articles in Serbian (or Serbo-Croatian) and 30 articles in Hungarian.

In 1983 he published a treatise on Private International Law (Međunarodno privatno pravo), which became the best known treatise in this field in the former Yugoslavia. It has 14 editions (since 2001 with co-authors).

During the past two decades, the most substantial part of his publications has been devoted to international commercial arbitration, including the casebook "International Commercial Arbitration – A Transnational Perspective" (West Publ. co-authors J. Barcelo from Cornell and A. Von Mehren from Harvard)) This casebook has been used on all five continents. The 7th edition was published in 2019.

His important professional publications also include the monograph "Language and Translation in International Commercial Arbitration" (T.M.C. Asser Press 2006), and the monograph "The Elusive Pro-Arbitration Priority in Contemporary Court Scrutiny of Arbitral Awards", in Collected Courses of the Xiamen Academy of International Law, Vol. 2, pp. 341–474, (M. Nijhoff Publ. 2009).

== Literary publications ==
Tibor Várady published literary essays and prose. His publications include the book of essays "Vagy nem maga az élet a legjobb időtöltés?" (Isn't life the perfect thing to pass time away? - 1971), the book "Mit i moda" (Myth and Fashion – this book published in Serbian received the "Stražilovo" literary price in 1979). His book "Az egérszürke szoba titka" (The Secret of the Mouse-Grey Room) written originally in Hungarian, was published in English translation as well, in 18 New Writing and Writers, 1980. In the introduction by the editor it is stated: "The Secret of the Mouse-Grey Room already has an important reputation in Eastern Europe as a satire that amusingly and accurately catches the tone of modern ideological semantics in East European bureaucracies."
