= Jojić =

Jojić (Serbian Cyrillic: Јојић, pronounced [jôjitɕ]) is a Serbo-Croatian surname. Notable people with the surname include:

- Miloš Jojić (born 1992), Serbian professional footballer
- Nikola Jojić (born 2003), Serbian professional footballer
- Petar Jojić (born 1938), Serbian politician
