= Flag of Croats of Serbia =

Flag of Croats of Serbia Zastava Hrvata u Srbiji
- Proportion: 1:2
- Adopted: 2005
- Design: A horizontal tricolor of red, white, and blue anchored by coat of arms of Croats of Serbia
- Designed by: Aleksandar David

The flag of Croats of Serbia (Croatian: Zastava Hrvata u Srbiji) is one of the main symbols of the Croat ethnic minority in Serbia.

== Design ==
It consists of three equal size, horizontal stripes in Pan-Slavic colors: red, white, and blue. In the center of the flag is the coat of arms of Croats of Serbia. It is similar to the flag of Croatia, with the sole difference being the absence of a crown above the coat of arms in the center; the coat of arms of Croatia includes the crown.

== Adoption ==
The flag and coat of arms of Croats of Serbia were adopted on 11 June 2005 in a session of the Croat National Council in Subotica.

== See also ==
- Croats of Serbia
- Croat National Council
- Flag of Croatia
- Coat of arms of Croatia
- Flag of Serbs of Croatia
