= Svetozar Gavrilović =

Serbian politician and doctor

Svetozar Gavrilović (Serbian Cyrillic: Светозар Гавриловић; born 13 July 1953) is a medical doctor and politician in Serbia. He was a member of the National Assembly of Serbia from 1997 to 2001 and was the mayor of Pančevo from 2012 to 2013. Gavrilović is a member of the Socialist Party of Serbia (Socijalistička partija Srbije, SPS).

== Early life and private career ==
Gavrilović was born in the village of Miroč in Majdanpek, in what was then the People's Republic of Serbia in the Federal People's Republic of Yugoslavia. He moved to Pančevo in 1964 and graduated from the University of Belgrade Faculty of Medicine in 1977. Gavrilović began working at the Pančevo General Hospital in 1980, completed his specialization in internal medicine in 1986, and he completed further specialization in gastroenterology with hepatology in 1996. He became vice-president of the general hospital for internal medicine in 2010.

== Politician ==
=== Member of the National Assembly (1997–2001) ===
Gavrilović joined the Socialist Party of Serbia in 1995. He appeared in the third position on the party's electoral list for the Pančevo division in the 1997 Serbian parliamentary election and was given a mandate when the list won four seats. (From 1992 to 2000, Serbia's electoral law stipulated that one-third of parliamentary mandates would be assigned to candidates on successful lists in numerical order, while the remaining two-thirds would be distributed amongst other candidates at the discretion of sponsoring parties or coalitions. Gavrilović was not automatically elected by virtue of his list position, but he was awarded a mandate all the same.) The SPS and its allies won a plurality victory overall, and the party remained the dominant presence in Serbia's coalition government after the election; Gavrilović served as a supporter of the administration. He was not a candidate in the 2000 Serbian parliamentary election, and his term ended in January 2001.

=== Local and provincial politics (2008–16) ===
Gavrilović appeared in the eleventh position on the SPS's list for the Pančevo city assembly in the 2008 Serbian local elections. The list did not cross the electoral threshold to win representation in the assembly.

He sought election to the Assembly of Vojvodina in the 2012 provincial election, running in Pančevo's first division, and was narrowly defeated in the second round of voting. He also received the lead position on the party's list for Pančevo in the 2012 local elections and was elected when the list won twelve mandates, finishing in third place overall. The local election did not produce a clear winner, and a coalition government was eventually formed by the SPS, the Serbian Progressive Party (Srpska napredna stranka, SNS), and other parties. Gavrilović was chosen as mayor. He served until May 2013, when he resigned, citing health issues.

Gavrilović later appeared in the twenty-eighth position on the SPS's list for Pančevo in the 2016 Serbian local elections. Election from this position was unlikely, and he was not elected when the list won only six seats.

== Electoral record ==
=== Provincial (Vojvodina) ===
2012 Vojvodina provincial election: Pančevo Division 1
Candidate	Party	First round		Second round	
Candidate	Party	Votes	%	Votes	%
Zoran Jovanović	Choice for a Better Vojvodina–Bojan Pajtic (Affiliation: Democratic Party)	2,874	17.11	6,844	50.28
Svetozar Gavrilović	Socialist Party of Serbia (SPS), Party of United Pensioners of Serbia (PUPS), United Serbia (JS), Social Democratic Party of Serbia (SDP Serbia) (Affiliation: Socialist Party of Serbia)	2,903	17.28	6,767	49.72
Pavle Radanov	Let's Get Vojvodina Moving–Tomislav Nikolić (Serbian Progressive Party, New Serbia, Movement of Socialists, Strength of Serbia Movement) (Affiliation: Serbian Progressive Party)	2,778	16.53		
Predrag Stojadinov	League of Social Democrats of Vojvodina–Nenad Čanak	2,332	13.88		
Petar Jojić	Serbian Radical Party	1,685	10.03		
Ljubisa Kesić	U-Turn	1,474	8.77		
Mileta Popović	Democratic Party of Serbia	1,470	8.75		
Suzana Jovanović	Saša Pavlov–United for Pančevo–United Regions of Serbia	1,286	7.65		
Total		16,802	100.00	13,611	100.00
