= Ministry of Justice (Serbia and Montenegro) =

Former government ministry responsible for judicial system

- Serbo-Croatian: Ministarstvo pravde/Министарство правде

Ministry overview
- Formed: 14 July 1992; 34 years ago
- Dissolved: 17 March 2003; 23 years ago
- Jurisdiction: Serbia and Montenegro
- Headquarters: Belgrade
- Ministers responsible: Tibor Várady, first Minister of the Interior; Savo Marković, last Minister of the Interior
- Parent department: Federal Government of the FR Yugoslavia

The Ministry of Justice was the justice ministry responsible for the judicial system of the Serbia and Montenegro, officially named the Federal Republic of Yugoslavia from 1992 to 2003.

== List of ministers ==
Following the breakup of Yugoslavia and the secession of four out of six constituent republic in the SFR Yugoslavia the remaining two (Serbia and Montenegro) established a federation in 1992 called the Federal Republic of Yugoslavia (FR Yugoslavia). This lasted until 2003 when it was reconstituted as a state union called Serbia and Montenegro. In 2006 both countries declared independence and parted ways.

No.	Portrait	Minister for Justice	Took office	Left office	Time in office	Party
1	Tibor Várady	Tibor Várady (born 1939)	14 July 1992	2 March 1993	231 days	Independent
2	Zoran Stojanović	Zoran Stojanović (born 1947)	2 March 1993	15 September 1994	1 year, 197 days	Independent
3	Uroš Klikovac	Uroš Klikovac (1935–2004)	15 September 1994	12 June 1996	1 year, 271 days	DPS
4	Vladimir Krivokapić	Vladimir Krivokapić (1940–2010)	12 June 1996	20 March 1997	281 days	DPS
5	Zoran Knežević	Zoran Knežević (1948–2014)	20 March 1997	12 August 1999	2 years, 145 days	DPS; SNP
6	Petar Jojić	Petar Jojić (born 1938)	12 August 1999	4 November 2000	1 year, 84 days	SRS
7	Momčilo Grubač	Momčilo Grubač (1940–2015)	4 November 2000	24 July 2001	262 days	DC
8	Savo Marković	Savo Marković (born 1955)	24 July 2001	17 March 2003	1 year, 236 days	NS

== See also ==
- Ministry of Justice (Yugoslavia)
- Ministry of Justice (Montenegro)
- Ministry of Justice (Serbia)
