= Ifeta Radončić =

Serbian politician (1955–2019)

Ifeta Radončić (Serbian Cyrillic: Ифета Радончић; 3 February 1955–1 November 2019) was a Serbian politician. A member of the country's Bosniak community, she was briefly a member of the National Assembly of Serbia in 2012 and held high municipal office in Novi Pazar. Radončić was a member of the Party of Democratic Action of Sandžak (Stranka demokratske akcije Sandžaka, SDA).

== Early life and private career ==
Radončić was born in Sjenica, in the Sandžak region of what was then the People's Republic of Serbia in the Federal People's Republic of Yugoslavia. She was raised in the community and later graduated from the University of Belgrade Faculty of Economics, majoring in economic policy and planning. She was a professor of economics in Novi Pazar from 1978 to 1982.

From 1982 to 2002, Radončić was the head of the department for social planning in Novi Pazar's municipal government. She was later the head of the city's department for economy, finance, and development from 2002 to 2007, led the city's administration for the collection of public revenue from 2007 to 2009, was a field control inspector in the latter department from 2010 to 2011, and was a collection inspector in the department from 2014 to 2016.

== Politician ==
Radončić appeared in the thirty-seventh position on the SDA-led Bosniak List for a European Sandžak in the 2008 Serbian parliamentary election. The list won two seats, and she was not given a mandate. (From 2000 to 2011, mandates in Serbian parliamentary elections were awarded to sponsoring parties or coalitions rather than individual candidates, and it was common practice for the mandates to be assigned out of numerical order. In theory, Radončić could have been given a mandate despite her list position.)

SDA leader Sulejman Ugljanin became a minister without portfolio in Serbia's government in 2008, overseeing the Office for Sustainable Development of Underdeveloped Areas. In 2011, Ugljanin appointed Radončić as an assistant director for the office.

Serbia's electoral system was reformed in 2011, such that all mandates were awarded to candidates on successful lists in numerical order. Radončić appeared in the lead position on the SDA's list in the 2012 Serbian parliamentary election and was elected when the list won two mandates.

The Sandžak Democratic Party (Sandžačka demokratska partija, SDP) narrowly defeated the SDA in Novi Pazar in the concurrent 2012 Serbian local elections. The two parties formed a grand coalition in the city after the election, and Radončić was appointed as one of the SDA's representatives on the city council (i.e., the executive branch of the city government), with responsibility for economy, development, and finance. She resigned her seat in parliament on 31 May 2012, the same day that the assembly convened, as she could not hold a dual mandate due to her positions in the republican and city administrations.

Radončić stood down from city council of her own volition on 24 September 2012. She continued to serve as an assistant director under Ugljanin until 2014, when he left the Serbian government.

She appeared in the sixth position on the SDA's list for the Novi Pazar city assembly in the 2016 Serbian local elections and was elected when the list won eleven out of forty-seven seats, finishing second against the SDP. The SDA joined the local SDP-led coalition government on 10 April 2017, and she became president (i.e., speaker) of the city assembly.

== Death ==
Radončić died on 1 November 2019.
