= Croatian Bunjevac-Šokac Party =

Croatian Bunjevac-Šokac Party Хрватско-буњевачко-шокачка странка Hrvatsko-bunjevačko-šokačka stranka
- Abbreviation: HBŠS
- President: Blaško Temunović
- Founded: 20 June 2004; 22 years ago
- Dissolved: 2011
- Headquarters: Zagrebačka 1, Subotica
- Ideology: Croat minority interests
- Colors: Red
- Slogan: We want the same rights that Serbs have in Croatia

Website
- hbs-stranka.org.rs

The Croatian Bunjevac-Šokac Party (Croatian: Hrvatsko-bunjevačko-šokačka stranka, Serbian: Хрватско-буњевачко-шокачка странка, Hrvatsko-bunjevačko-šokačka stranka, HBŠS) was a political party in Serbia that represented the Croat ethnic minority in the province of Vojvodina.

== History ==
It was founded 20 June 2004 in Subotica. The aim of the party is to represent Croats from Bunjevac and Šokac communities. The party claimed to be the successor of the Bunjevac-Šokac Party that existed during the Kingdom of Serbs, Croats and Slovenes. The party was based in Subotica, Zagrebačka 1 Street. Its most recent president was Blaško Temunović. In 2007, he was beaten by two unknown attackers who also insulted his ethnic background. Party slogan was "we want the same rights that Serbs have in Croatia". This party set as its basic aim to unify all Croats from the area of Vojvodina and Central Serbia. In Serbian presidential election 2008, Croatian Bunjevac-Šokac Party supported Čedomir Jovanović of Liberal Democratic Party. HBŠS had no success on parliamentary elections, unlike Democratic Alliance of Croats in Vojvodina and Croatian National Alliance (as of 9 November 2007).
