= Radio Subotica =

- Subotica; Serbia
- Frequency: 104.4 MHz

Programming
- Languages: Serbian, Croatian, Hungarian

History
- First air date: 29 November 1968; 57 years ago

Links
- Website: radiosubotica.co.rs, radiosubotica.com

Radio Subotica is a radio station, broadcasting from Subotica, Vojvodina, Serbia. It was founded on 29 November 1968. It broadcasts program on 3 languages: Serbian, Croatian and Hungarian.
