= Petar Jojić =

Serbian politician

- Петар Јојић
- Born: 12 July 1938 (age 88)
- Occupation: Politician
- Political party: Serbian Radical Party

Petar Jojić (Serbian Cyrillic: Петар Јојић; born 12 July 1938) is a Serbian politician. He has served several terms in the National Assembly of Serbia as a member of the far-right Serbian Radical Party and was justice minister for the Federal Republic of Yugoslavia from 1999 to 2000.

== Private career ==
Jojić is a lawyer based in Pančevo in the Serbian province of Vojvodina.

== Political career ==
=== Parliamentarian ===
Jojić was elected to the Assembly of the Federal Republic of Yugoslavia's Chamber of Citizens in the 1996 election. The Radical Party won sixteen seats and initially served in opposition to a governing alliance led by the Socialist Party of Serbia and its Montenegrin allies.

=== Cabinet minister ===
The Radical Party joined the government of FR Yugoslavia in August 1999, shortly after the conclusion of the North Atlantic Treaty Organization (NATO)'s bombing of Yugoslavia in the context of the Kosovo War. Six members of the Radical Party became cabinet ministers in the government of Momir Bulatović on 12 August 1999, including Jojić in the justice portfolio.

==== Kosovo and Metohija ====
In late August 1999, Jojić accused the international military and civilian missions operating in Kosovo and Metohija (Kosovo Force (KFOR) and the United Nations Interim Administration Mission in Kosovo (UNMIK)) of failing to honour the terms of the United Nations Security Council Resolution 1244 on the breakaway province. He argued that the authorities of FR Yugoslavia were justified in insisting on a Yugoslav army and Serbian police presence at the main border crossings, stating that over one hundred thousand guerrilla fighters had crossed the border from Albania into Kosovo. He also accused the United States of America, the United Kingdom, and Germany of being accomplices in acts of violence directed against the Kosovo Serb population.

Jojić later indicated the strong opposition of FR Yugoslavia to the creation of the Kosovo Protection Corps as an officially sanctioned successor group to the Kosovo Liberation Army. On one occasion, he said that UNMIK leader Bernard Kouchner "does not respect any law, either international law or local law ... and has formed an army of Albanian terrorists."

Concerning the NATO bombing, Jojić remarked that its most important consequences were those pertaining to the breakdown of international law and the violation of FR Yugoslavia's legal status as a sovereign state and United Nations member. The FR Yugoslavia was not an active member of the UN in 1999 because they refused to re-apply for membership under the United Nations Security Council Resolution 777.

==== Extraditions of accused war criminals ====
Jojić met with representatives of the Association for Criminal Law and Criminology of Yugoslavia on 30 August 1999; the group concluded that the country's constitution and law on criminal procedure did not permit the extradition of Yugoslav civilians to any external country or organization. Jojić later said that he would "personally never allow any citizen in Yugoslavia to be delivered to the so-called court of injustice in The Hague," referring to the International Criminal Tribunal for the former Yugoslavia. In April 2000, he urged the United Nations Security Council to release former Bosnian Serb leader Momčilo Krajišnik from custody in The Hague, saying that he had been arrested "in a terrorist fashion."

On May 24, 2000, Jojić released a twenty-five-page open letter to the international tribunal that, among other things, described the court as "not an international legal institution but a criminal organization that consists of mercenaries, spies, scumbags, America's and NATO's servants," and accused chief prosecutor Carla del Ponte of "running the dungeon which, like the worst whore, you have sold out to the Americans and to which you bring innocent Serbs by force, by kidnapping and murder." This document was widely reported in the international press and has since attained a status of notoriety for its strongly undiplomatic language.

==== Yugoslav law and related matters ====
Days after his appointment as justice minister, Jojić warned leaders of a planned opposition rally in Belgrade that the state would respond with "all available means" if protesters committed any acts of violence. While he advised opposition leaders (some of whom he described as "Western stooges") that they had a legal right to hold the rally, he added that state institutions would be obligated to take "timely and effective" measures if "the smallest incident, or an attempt to instigate violence" occurred. This was widely interpreted at an attempt at intimidation, though in the event the opposition rally took place without incident on August 19, 1999.

Jojić issued a ruling in June 2000 declining to register the Belgrade branch of the opposition group Otpor! He wrote, "the applicants have been acting illegally for some time and in violation of our regulations, for instance by organizing public meetings and inciting citizens to revolt in order to bring down the constitutional system."

In September 1999, Jojić said that Yugoslavia's new penal code (which, among other things, abolished capital punishment and replaced it with life sentences), would be valid in the whole of the country – including in Montenegro, where some had questioned its implementation. He later said that the government of Montenegro's amnesty to 14,000 Montenegrin citizens who refused to join the Yugoslav army during the NATO bombing would undermine Yugoslavia's legal system.

Jojić helped steward the passage of an electoral reform law in July 2000 that, along with other changes, permitted Yugoslav president Slobodan Milošević to seek re-election. He tried in the same period to bring forward an anti-terrorism bill that critics described as severely restricting the civil liberties of Yugoslav citizens, though he withdrew the bill after it was opposed by Radical Party leader Vojislav Šešelj.

Jojić's term as justice minister ended on November 4, 2000, soon after the fall of Milošević's government and the election of Vojislav Koštunica as Yugoslav president. Before leaving office, Jojić refused an order from Koštunica to begin clemency hearings for Flora Brovina, a Kosovar Albanian who had been convicted of aiding separatists in Kosovo and Metohija and was widely regarded as a political prisoner. (Brovina was released from prison a few days later when Koštunica issued a direct pardon.) After leaving office, Jojić protested against the opening of a Belgrade office of the international tribunal, saying that it would become "a centre for the arrest of national heroes such as Radovan Karadžić and Ratko Mladić."

=== Member of the National Assembly of Serbia ===
Jojić sought re-election to the Chamber of Citizens in the 2000 Yugoslav election but was defeated when the Radical Party failed to win any mandates in his division. He subsequently received the tenth position on the Radical Party's electoral list in the 2000 Serbian parliamentary election and joined the party's delegation to the national assembly after it won twenty-three mandates. (From 2000 to 2011, Serbian parliamentary mandates were awarded to sponsoring parties or coalitions rather than to individual candidates, and it was common practice for mandates to be awarded out of numerical order. Although Jojić did not automatically receive a mandate by virtue of his position on the list, he was included in the party's assembly delegation all the same.) In early 2001, he represented the Radical Party in talks with Serbian president Milan Milutinović prior to the appointment of a new government. Zoran Đinđić of the Democratic Party was ultimately appointed as prime minister, and the Radicals served in opposition.

Jojić was again included in the Radical Party's parliamentary delegations after the elections of 2003, 2007, and 2008. Prior to the 2008 election, deputy Radical leader Tomislav Nikolić remarked that Jojić had distinguished himself as justice minister and could be included in a Radical Party cabinet if the party formed government. Ultimately, however, the party remained in opposition during this period.

The Radical Party split following the 2008 election, with many leading party figures aligning themselves with the breakaway Progressive Party under the leadership of Nikolić and Aleksandar Vučić. Jojić remained with the Radicals.

Serbia's electoral system was reformed in 2011, such that parliamentary mandates were awarded in numerical order to candidates on successful lists. Jojić received the eighth position on the Radical Party's list in the 2012 election; the party failed to cross the electoral threshold to win representation in the assembly. He was not a candidate in 2014 but was returned to parliament in the 2016 election after receiving the nineteenth position on the Radical list, which won twenty-two mandates. Once again serving as an opposition member of the assembly, Jojić is currently a member of the parliamentary committee on European integration and a deputy member of the committee on constitutional and legislative issues and the committee on the judiciary, public administration, and local self-government.

=== Municipal and provincial politics ===
Jojić was elected to the Pančevo municipal assembly in 2008 at the head of the local Radical Party list and served in opposition to the city's coalition government for the next four years. He sought re-election in 2012, once again at the head of the list, though on this occasion the party failed to cross the electoral threshold. He also sought election to the Assembly of Vojvodina for single-member constituency divisions in Pančevo in 2004 and 2012 but was defeated both times.

== Warrant for arrest ==
In January 2015, Jojić and two other members of the Radical Party (Jovo Ostojić and Vjerica Radeta) were charged with contempt of court by the International Criminal Tribunal for the former Yugoslavia for having allegedly "threatened, intimidated, offered bribes to or otherwise interfered with" witnesses in the trial of party leader Vojislav Šešelj. Jojić was specifically accused of dictating a statement for a witness for the prosecution that was untruthful "in that it contained false allegations against the prosecution and misrepresented the role and responsibilities of Šešelj during the war."

The three accused declined to go to The Hague to face the charges, and a Serbian court subsequently ruled that the country was not obligated to extradite them; the ruling indicated that Serbian law only requires the extradition of persons accused of serious offences such as war crimes, not those accused of contempt of court or other comparatively minor crimes. The tribunal continued to demand that the accused be extradited, arguing that Serbia's existing legislation could not be used as an excuse for non-compliance and urging the country to change its legislation to comply with the arrest warrants. Foreign affairs minister Ivica Dačić responded in August 2016 that Serbia's law on extraditions had been adopted by the Serbian parliament in cooperation with international agencies, that no objections were raised at the time, and that the tribunal had no authority to propose changes.

In March 2017, Interpol issued high-priority red notices for the arrests of Jojić and his two colleagues. Rasim Ljajić, a deputy prime minister of Serbia, responded by stating that, "There is a Serbian court ruling that they will not be surrendered. There is no legal ground for this, and we have to respect the conclusions of the independent judicial authorities." The matter remains unresolved, and Jojić continues to serve as a member of the Serbian parliament, as does Radeta. Jovo Ostojić died of natural causes in June 2017 without having been arrested or extradited.

With the wrapping up of the International Criminal Tribunal for the former Yugoslavia in December 2017, Jojić's case was transferred to the Mechanism for International Criminal Tribunals. In March 2018, the latter entity indicated that the Serbian ministry of justice had expressed a willingness to try Jojić in Serbia and that the matter was under consideration.

== Electoral record ==
=== Provincial (Vojvodina) ===
2012 Vojvodina provincial election: Pančevo Division 1
Candidate	Party	First round		Second round	
Candidate	Party	Votes	%	Votes	%
Zoran Jovanović	Choice for a Better Vojvodina–Bojan Pajtic (Affiliation: Democratic Party)	2,874	17.11	6,844	50.28
Svetozar Gavrilović	Socialist Party of Serbia (SPS), Party of United Pensioners of Serbia (PUPS), United Serbia (JS), Social Democratic Party of Serbia (SDP Serbia) (Affiliation: Socialist Party of Serbia)	2,903	17.28	6,767	49.72
Pavle Radanov	Let's Get Vojvodina Moving–Tomislav Nikolić (Serbian Progressive Party, New Serbia, Movement of Socialists, Strength of Serbia Movement) (Affiliation: Serbian Progressive Party)	2,778	16.53		
Predrag Stojadinov	League of Social Democrats of Vojvodina–Nenad Čanak	2,332	13.88		
Petar Jojić	Serbian Radical Party	1,685	10.03		
Ljubisa Kesić	U-Turn	1,474	8.77		
Mileta Popović	Democratic Party of Serbia	1,470	8.75		
Suzana Jovanović	Saša Pavlov–United for Pančevo–United Regions of Serbia	1,286	7.65		
Total		16,802	100.00	13,611	100.00

2004 Vojvodina assembly election Pančevo III (constituency seat) - First and Second Rounds
Siniša Kojić	Democratic Party	1,631	18.02	3,259	50.96
Petar Jojić	Serbian Radical Party	2,783	30.75	3,136	49.04
Slobodan-Opanak Opačić	My Pančevo	947	10.47		
Maksim Simić	Democratic Party of Serbia	834	9.22		
Sreten Rajković	Socialist Party of Serbia	697	7.70		
Nebojša Kesić	Pančevo Municipal Party	639	7.06		
Sonja Radivojev	Coalition: Together for Vojvodina–Nenad Čanak	587	6.49		
Branko Krsmanović	G17 Plus	472	5.22		
Čedomir Nebrigić	Vojvodina Coalition	459	5.07		
Total valid votes		9,049	100	6,395	100
Invalid ballots		530		203	
Total votes casts		9,579	27.10	6,598	18.67
