= Hrvatska riječ =

- Type: Weekly newspaper
- Publisher: NIU Hrvatska riječ
- Founded: 31 May 1945; 81 years ago
- Language: Croatian
- Headquarters: Preradovićeva 4, Subotica, Vojvodina, Serbia
- ISSN: 1451-4257
- Website: www.hrvatskarijec.rs

Hrvatska riječ (lit.: The Croatian Word) is a Croatian language weekly newspaper in Serbia. It is currently published in Subotica.

== History ==
It was founded in 1945, with the purpose to serve as the information organ for the Croatian minority of Serbia. It was published like this until 1956, but was no longer printed until 2003, when the newspaper was re-launched.

== See also ==
- Croats of Serbia
- Croat National Council
