= Slaven Bačić =

Serbian historian and lawyer

- Славен Бачић

President of Croat National Council of Serbia

Personal details
- Born: 1965 (age 60–61) Subotica, SR Serbia, SFR Yugoslavia
- Party: Democratic Alliance of Croats in Vojvodina
- Education: University of Novi Sad, University of Belgrade, University of Osijek
- Occupation: lawyer

Slaven Bačić (Serbian Cyrillic: Славен Бачић; born 1965) is a Serbian Croat legal historian and lawyer, and the current president of the Croat National Council of Serbia.

== Biography ==
Slaven Bačić was born in 1965 in Subotica.

In 1988 he graduated from the University of Novi Sad Faculty of Law. In 1992 he earned his master's degree from the Faculty of Law in Belgrade. In 2002, he obtained his PhD from the Faculty of Law in Osijek, Croatia.

He works as a lawyer in Subotica since 1994.
