= Croatian National Alliance =

Political party in Vojvodina, Serbia

The Croatian National Alliance (Croatian: Hrvatski narodni savez, abbreviation: HNS) was a political party of ethnic Croats in autonomous province of Vojvodina, Serbia.

Founding session was held on December 6, 1998, in Subotica. The party seat was in Subotica.

Chronologically, HNS was second party of Croats from Serbia and first that emerged from dissatisfied fraction from Democratic Alliance of Croats in Vojvodina, DSHV. Majority of founders were former members of DSHV (Branko Horvat,...). The President of Initiating Committee was Franjo Vujkov became the President.

In local elections in Serbia 2000, HNS went into coalition with its "mother" party, DSHV. Coalition achieved results, so HNS got several mandates.

As time went, both sides saw that the other parties are getting advantage from DHSV-HNS disagreement. So on February 11, 2004, DSHV began negotiations on reincorporating of HNS to DSHV. The grounds were that conditions have changed compared to previous elections. Ethnic structure in Subotica, the city that is cultural and political centre of Croats in Serbia, has changed at the expense of Croats. The second reason that started things moving is that that new party in Serbia, G17+, got a lot of Croat votes in the electoral units with numerous Croats, that indicated to flow of Croat votes.

Finally, on February 29, 2004, after negotiations, Croatian National Alliance reincorporated back into Democratic Alliance of Croats in Vojvodina.

On the side of DHSV, negotiators were acting President Petar Kuntić and Vice presidents Josip Gabrić and Martin Bačić and members of Presidency and Council Marko Berberović, Đorđe Čović i Josip Jaramazović.

On the side of HNS, negotiators were President Franjo Vujkov and Presidency members Branko Horvat, Bela Ivković and Dujo Runje.

After reincorporation, Party President Franjo Vujkov became the Vice president of DSHV.
