= Croat National Council =

Representative body of ethnic minority in Serbia

Croatian National Council of the Republic of Serbia
- Hrvatsko nacionalno vijeće Republike Srbije Хрватско национално вијеће Републике Србије
- Abbreviation: HNV
- Formation: 23 January 2003; 23 years ago
- Type: Non-profit entity
- Purpose: Protection of ethnic minority rights of Croats in Serbia
- Headquarters: Subotica, Serbia
- Region served: Serbia
- Official language: Croatian
- President: Jasna Vojnić
- Vice: Andrija Ađin; Andrija Kopilović; Mata Matarić; Zlatko Načev
- Secretary: Željko Pakledinac
- Website: hnv.org.rs

Croatian National Council of the Republic of Serbia (Croatian: Hrvatsko nacionalno vijeće Republike Srbije; Serbian: Хрватско национално вијеће Републике Србије) is the representative body of Croats in Serbia, established for the protection of the rights and the minority self-government of Croats in Serbia.

It represents Croatian national minority in the official use of language, education, information and culture, participates in decision-making or decide on issues and establishes institutions in these areas.

== History ==
It was established under the Act on Protection of Rights and Freedoms of National Minorities.

Although Council was officially established on constitutive session on 23 January 2003, aldermen which established Council were elected on electoral congress which happened on 15 December 2002 in Subotica.

== Organs ==
=== Councilors ===
Croatian National Council has 29 councilors, who elect president and vice presidents.

=== President ===
President represents Croatian National Council and he is elected by councilors. Current president is Jasna Vojnić, and previous president was Slaven Bačić.

=== Vice presidents ===
Croatian National Council has 4 vice presidents. Council elect them from among its members, on basis of territorial representation. 1 vice president comes from Syrmia, 1 from Podunavlje, 1 from Sombor and 1 from Subotica. They assist the president of Council in performance of chores from their scope, according to territory they were elected.

Current vice presidents are: Andrija Ađin (from Podunavlje), Andrija Kopilović (from Subotica), Mata Matarić (from Sombor) and Zlatko Načev (from Syrmia).

=== Executive board ===
Executive board prepares and implements decisions of Croatian National Council. It has 6 members: president, vice president and 4 other members (for area of culture, education, informing and official use of Croatian language).

Current members are: Darko Sarić Lukendić (president), Petar Balažević (vice president), Andrej Španović (culture), Anđela Horvat (education), Ankica Jukić Mandić (informing) and Ivan Stipić (official use of language and letter).

=== Committees ===
HNV has 7 constant committees: for education, culture, informing, official use of language, finances, budget, regulations and for representatives and complaints.

There are also committees for economy, sport and for enrollment in special electoral list of Croatian minority.

=== Secretary ===
Secretary cares for legality of Council work and he prepares proposals of decisions of Council. Current secretary is Željko Pakledinac.

== Number of electors by settlement (on 15 December 2002) ==
- 91 electors: Subotica
- 19 electors: Tavankut
- 15 electors: Sombor
- 10 electors: Bajmok
- 6 electors: Đurđin, Palić, Stari Žednik
- 5 electors: Mala Bosna
- 4 electors: Bački Breg, Bački Monoštor, Ljutovo
- 3 electors: Golubinci, Petrovaradin, Novi Slankamen, Sonta, Sremska Mitrovica
- 2 electors: Belgrade, New Belgrade, Novi Sad, Sremska Kamenica
- 1 elector: Banatsko Novo Selo, Belegiš, Bezdan, Bikovo, Novi Banovci, Ruma, Stara Pazova, Surčin

== Institutions ==
- Hrvatska riječ, Croatian language weekly newspaper
- Department for culture of Croats of Vojvodina, cultural institution

== Symbols ==
=== Flag and coat of arms ===
Flag of Croats of Serbia

Coat of arms of Croats of Serbia

=== Logo ===
Logo of Council consists of red square in upper left corner, which is derived from Croatian coat of arms, and stylised letters hnv in bottom. Letters h and v are blue and letter n is gray. Logo was designed by Darko Vuković (from Novi Sad) and adopted on 10 September 2010.
