= Democratic Alliance of Croats in Vojvodina =

Political party in Serbia

Democratic Alliance of Croats in Vojvodina Demokratski savez Hrvata u Vojvodini Демократски савез Хрвата у Војводини
- Abbreviation: DSHV
- Leader: Tomislav Žigmanov
- Founded: 15 July 1990
- Registered: 23 August 1990
- Headquarters: Beogradski put 31, Subotica
- Ideology: Croat minority interests; Vojvodina autonomism; Pro-Europeanism
- International affiliation: Federal Union of European Nationalities
- Colours: Red; White; Blue
- National Assembly: 0 / 250
- Assembly of Vojvodina: 0 / 120
- City Assembly of Subotica: 3 / 67

Website
- dshv.rs

The Democratic Alliance of Croats in Vojvodina (Croatian: Demokratski savez Hrvata u Vojvodini, abbrev. DSHV; Serbian: Демократски савез Хрвата у Војводини) is a political party in Serbia, representing the Croat ethnic minority.

== History ==
Over time, some party members were unsatisfied with party's policy, so they separated and formed new Croat parties:

- Hrvatski narodni savez (Croatian National Alliance) – in 1998 (this fraction has been reincorporated into DSHV on 29 February 2004)
- Hrvatska bunjevačko-šokačka stranka (Croatian Bunjevac-Šokac Party)
- Demokratska zajednica Hrvata (Democratic Union of Croats) – in 2007

In 2009 DSHV negotiated with another ethnic Croat party from the Syrmia region of Vojvodina, the Hrvatska srijemska inicijativa / Hrvatska sremska inicijativa (Croatian Syrmian Initiative). It was planned that HSI and DSHV would unite on 5 June 2009 at a meeting in Sremska Mitrovica.

It has occasionally condemned attacks by Serbian nationalists, and it has issued protests over ethnic assimilation. It is also supportive of further autonomism.

== List of presidents ==
- Bela Tonković (1990–2003)
- Petar Kuntić (2003–2015)
- Tomislav Žigmanov (2015–present)

== Electoral performance ==
=== Parliamentary elections ===
National Assembly of Serbia
Year	Leader	Popular vote	% of popular vote	#	# of seats	Seat change	Coalition	Status
1990	Bela Tonković	23,630	0.49%	▲16th	1 / 250	▲1	–	Opposition
1992	Bela Tonković	17,622	0.40%	▲13th	0 / 250	▼1	–	Extra-parliamentary
1993	Bela Tonković	3,946	0.10%	▼23rd	0 / 250	0	–	Extra-parliamentary
1997	Bela Tonković	5,375	0.14%	▲18th	0 / 250	0	–	Extra-parliamentary
2000	Bela Tonković	did not participate			0 / 250	0	–	Extra-parliamentary
2003	Petar Kuntić	161,765	4.29%	▲7th	0 / 250	0	ZZT	Extra-parliamentary
2007	Petar Kuntić	915,854	23.08%	▲2nd	1 / 250	▲1	DSHV–DS–SDP	Support
2008	Petar Kuntić	1,590,200	39.25%	▲1st	1 / 250	0	ZES	Support
2012	Petar Kuntić	863,294	23.09%	▼2nd	1 / 250	0	IZBŽ	Opposition
2014	Petar Kuntić	216,634	6.23%	▼3rd	0 / 250	▼1	DSHV–DS–Nova–BS–USS Sloga	Extra-parliamentary
2016	Tomislav Žigmanov	227,589	6.20%	▼5th	1 / 250	▲1	DSHV–DS–Nova–RS–ZZS–ZZŠ	Opposition
2020	Tomislav Žigmanov	30,591	0.99%	▼13th	0 / 250	▼1	UDS	Extra-parliamentary
2022	Tomislav Žigmanov	24,024	0.65%	▼14th	1 / 250	▲1	DSHV–ZZV	Government
2023	Tomislav Žigmanov	29,066	0.78%	▲11th	0 / 250	▼1	DSHV–SPP	Government

View source data.

== See also ==
- Croats of Serbia
