= Banovina Palace (Novi Sad) =

Administrative building in Novi Sad, Serbia

- Зграда Бановине: Báni palota (Hungarian); Bánovinský palác (Slovak); Palatul Băniei (Romanian); Zgrada Banovine (Croatian); Бановинска палата (Pannonian Rusyn)
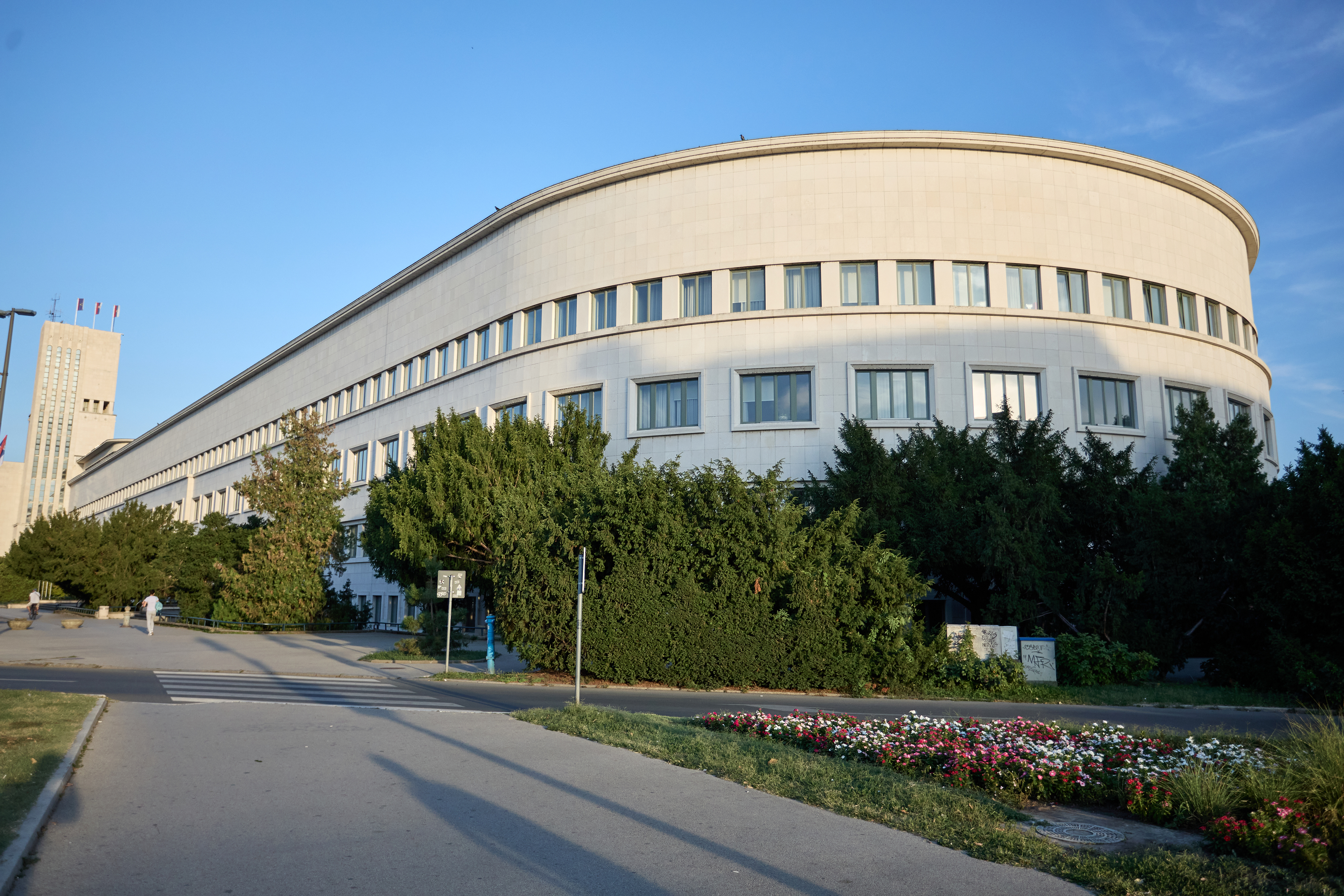
- Interactive map of the Banovina Palace area

General information
- Architectural style: Modernist; Art Deco; Stripped Classicism
- Location: Bulevar Mihajla Pupina 16 (Banovina); Vladike Platona 1 (Banski dvor), Novi Sad, Serbia
- Coordinates: 45.2534°N 19.8492°E
- Current tenants: Government of Vojvodina (Banovina); Assembly of Vojvodina (Banski dvor)
- Year built: 1936–1940
- Construction started: 1936; 90 years ago
- Completed: 1939; 87 years ago (Banovina); 1940; 86 years ago (Banski dvor)
- Opened: 25 September 1939; 86 years ago
- Renovated: 2019; 7 years ago (Banovina); 2020; 6 years ago (Banski dvor)
- Cost: 58,000,000 Yugoslav dinars (1939)
- Renovation cost: 30,175,000 Serbian dinars (2019; Banovina); 28,825,000 Serbian dinars (2020; Banski dvor)
- Owner: Government of Vojvodina

Height
- Height: 20 m (66 ft); 42 m (138 ft) (tower)

Dimensions
- Diameter: 185 m × 42.5 m (607 ft × 139 ft) (Banovina); 100 m × 57.5 m (328 ft × 189 ft) (Banski dvor)

Technical details
- Material: Brač marble Carrara marble
- Floor count: 5 (Banovina)
- Floor area: 5,700 m^{2} (61,000 sq ft) (Banovina); 2,200 m^{2} (24,000 sq ft) (Banski dvor)

Design and construction
- Architect: Dragiša Brašovan
- Other designers: Károly Baranyi (relief sculptor)
- Main contractor: Milan Sekulić Construction Company

Other information
- Number of rooms: 569 (Banovina); 147 (Banski dvor)
- Parking: 167 parking spaces (underground garage)
- Public transit access: JGSP Novi Sad lines: 1, 3, 3A, 3B, 8, 9, 9A, 11A, 11B

The Banovina Palace (Note: Serbian: Бановинска палата, romanized: Banovinska palata, Hungarian: Báni palota, Romanian: Palatul Băniei, Slovak: Bánovinský palác, Croatian: Banovinska palata, Pannonian Rusyn: Бановинска палата) in Novi Sad, Serbia, is a complex consisting of two buildings. The larger Banovina serves as the seat of the Government of Vojvodina, while the smaller Banski dvor serves as the seat of the Assembly of Vojvodina. The buildings, designed by Dragiša Brašovan, were constructed between 1936 and 1940 in modernist style (with art deco and stripped classicism elements) as the administrative seat of the Danube Banovina.

== Location ==
Banovina Palace complex is located in the Stari Grad neighborhood of Novi Sad, east of the City Assembly of Novi Sad and north of Isidora Sekulić Gymnasium. The larger Banovina building entrances are towards Mihajla Pupina Boulevard, Žarka Zrenjanina Street, and Banovina Passage, also cornering Jovana Đorđevića Street at its the eastern end. The smaller Banski dvor building is located south of Banovina, separated by the Banovina Passage connected to Žarka Zrenjanina and Jovana Đorđevića streets. Southern entrance of the building connects to the Vladike Platona Street.

Banovina park is located at the southwestern end of the complex, with the statue of Vasa Stajić and a public parking garage underneath.

== History ==
Plans for the construction of the Banovina Palace complex started immediately after the creation of the Danube Banovina administrative region in 1929. During 1930, the national architectural competition, ratified by the first Danube Ban Daka Popović, was held for the conceptual solution of the building, planned to house the banovina administration, the great hall, and the ban's residence. Due to a series of circumstances, Dragiša Brašovan was ultimately entrusted creation and realization of a new project, despite the fact that his work fared rather poorly in the competition. The conceptual plans were completed in 1935. The architecture of the palace was meant to symbolize the economic strength and prosperity of the Danube Banovina. The cost of the construction, funded by Yugoslav Royal Banking Administration, was 58 million Yugoslav dinars, double of the previously planned budget.

The construction started in 1936. The construction of the complex was done by the construction company of the architect Milan Sekulić. Over 700 workers were tasked in the construction of the complex, of which more than 200 were qualified craftsmen. During the construction of the buildings, citizens showed great interest, while newspapers regularly followed individual stages of construction.

In the procees of the construction, it was decided that the building would deviate from initial plans in several ways. The building would cover its façade with marble and other stones, instead of the previously planned clinker bricks. It is unknown what type of brick and color of brick would have been used for the construction. The plans also intended to have an installed clock with zodiac signs on the Banovina tower, along with additional statues adorning the sides of the Banovina façade. Despite the buildings still under construction, the completion of works was announced on 1 December 1938, for the 20th anniversary of the establishment of the Kingdom of Serbs, Croats, and Slovenes. The Banovina was eventually completed in late 1939, while Banski dvor in early 1940.

Until the World War II the building had stylized national coats of arms of the Kingdom of Yugoslavia at the northern entrances to the building. Between 1939 and 1941, the complex served its original purpose as the administrative center of the Danube Banovina. During the war, it was the headquarters of the Hungarian Military Administration in Bačka under the General Bela Novaković and the Hungarian Internal Armed Forces. During that period the reliefs on top of the northern entrance of the Banovina palace was removed and destroyed, only for replicas of these reliefs to be placed back in 2010.

After the World War II, until the mid-1950s, it was the headquarters of the National Assembly of Vojvodina (proclaimed by the 1946 Yugoslav Constitution). It also housed the military club of the Yugoslav People's Army, where various cultural events were held.

In 2019, 80 years since the construction of the Banovina Palace complex, the façade of the Banovina building was renovated and restored. This effort was done by the Institute for the Protection of Cultural Monuments of the City of Novi Sad and the University of Novi Sad Faculty of Technical Sciences. The renovation included the reconstruction of damaged or missing parts on the 10,700 square meters of the façade, cleaning the 670 square meters of entrance stone stairs and fence walls, the restoration of decorative elements, as well as placing anti-graffiti protection. The renovation was funded by the Government of Vojvodina, costing over 30 million Serbian dinars. Renovation and restoration of the Banski dvor building was done by the end of December 2020, costing nearly 29 million Serbian dinars, with the overall costs for renovating the entire Banovina Palace complex ending up being 59 million Serbian dinars.

In 2024, construction of the public underground parking garage with 167 parking places at the location of the Banovina park was completed. During the construction, the Banski dvor building was damaged due to construction tremors that effected the buildings foundations, resulting in cracks forming on the inner and outer walls, as well as damage to water and sewage pipes. Parts of the building were off limits until the damage was repaired.

== Architecture ==
=== Banovina ===
The Banovina building has a closed elongated horseshoe-shaped base. The semi-circular part of the building is located on the western side, while on the eastern side, there is a tower with a square base. The building consists of a basement, ground floor, and two floors. It is 180 meters long, 44 meters wide, and around 20 meters high (except for the tower, which is 42 meters high). It is covered with white Brač island marble from the Pučišća quarry, while the interior is covered with Carrara marble. Above the representative entrance facing Mihajla Pupina Boulevard, there are medallions with resemblance to kings, Peter I of Serbia and Alexander I of Yugoslavia, as well as to field marshals of the Royal Serbian Army: Stepa Stepanović, Živojin Mišić, Radomir Putnik, and Petar Bojović; all done by local sculpture Károly Baranyi. Due to the buildings design resembling a large ship with a sail mast, the Banovina was also called the White Cruiser.

The building consists of a total of 569 rooms and a reception hall at the center of the building. Most of the rooms are office spaces, arranged continuously along the external façade, accessible with wide corridors oriented towards the four inner courtyards.

=== Banski dvor ===
Banski dvor is of a crustal base, a dimension of 57 to 100 meters, and with a basement, ground floor, floor, and an attic. The building has 147 rooms and an assembly hall.

== Gallery ==
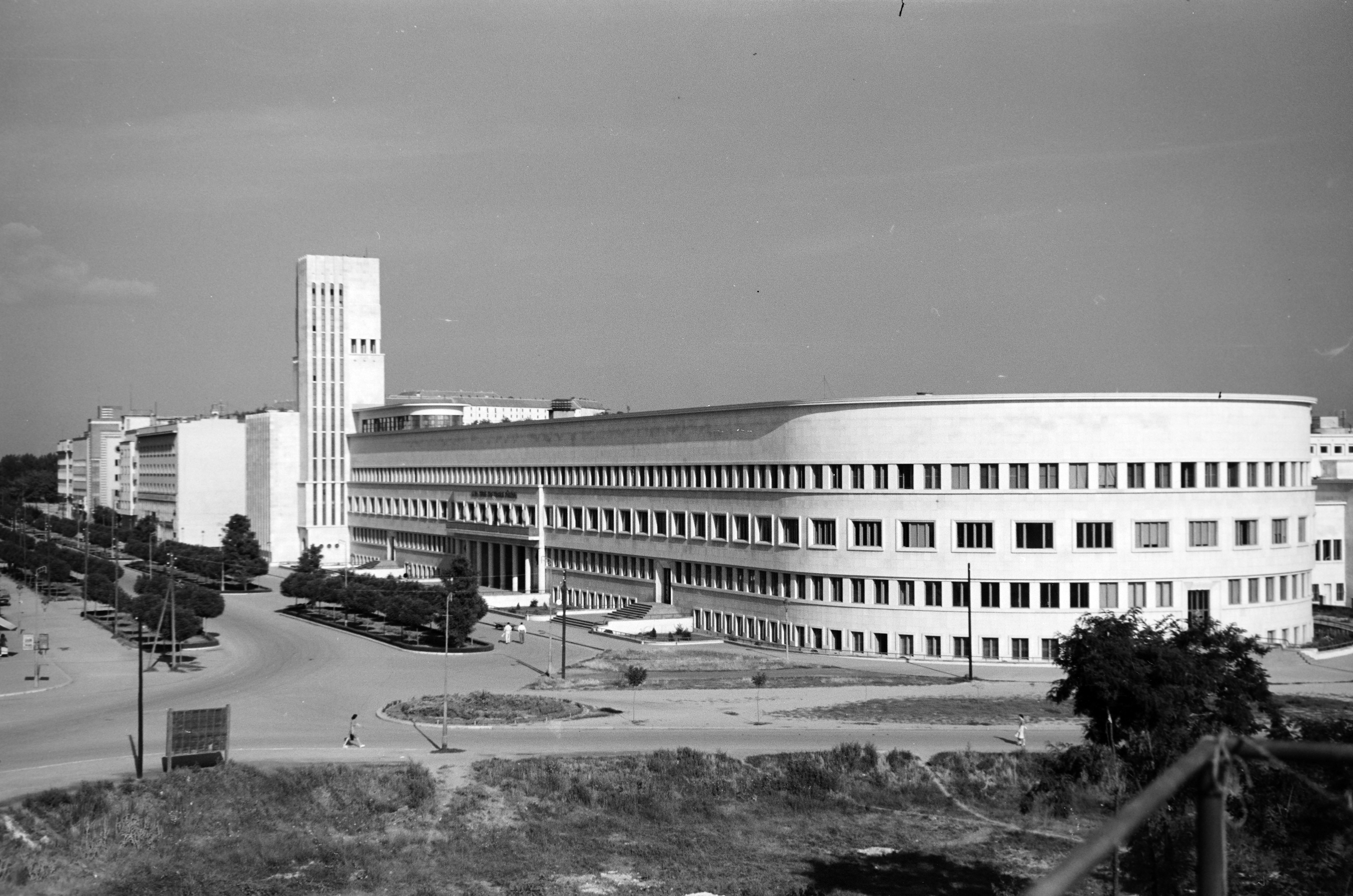
The Banovina Palace, 1941

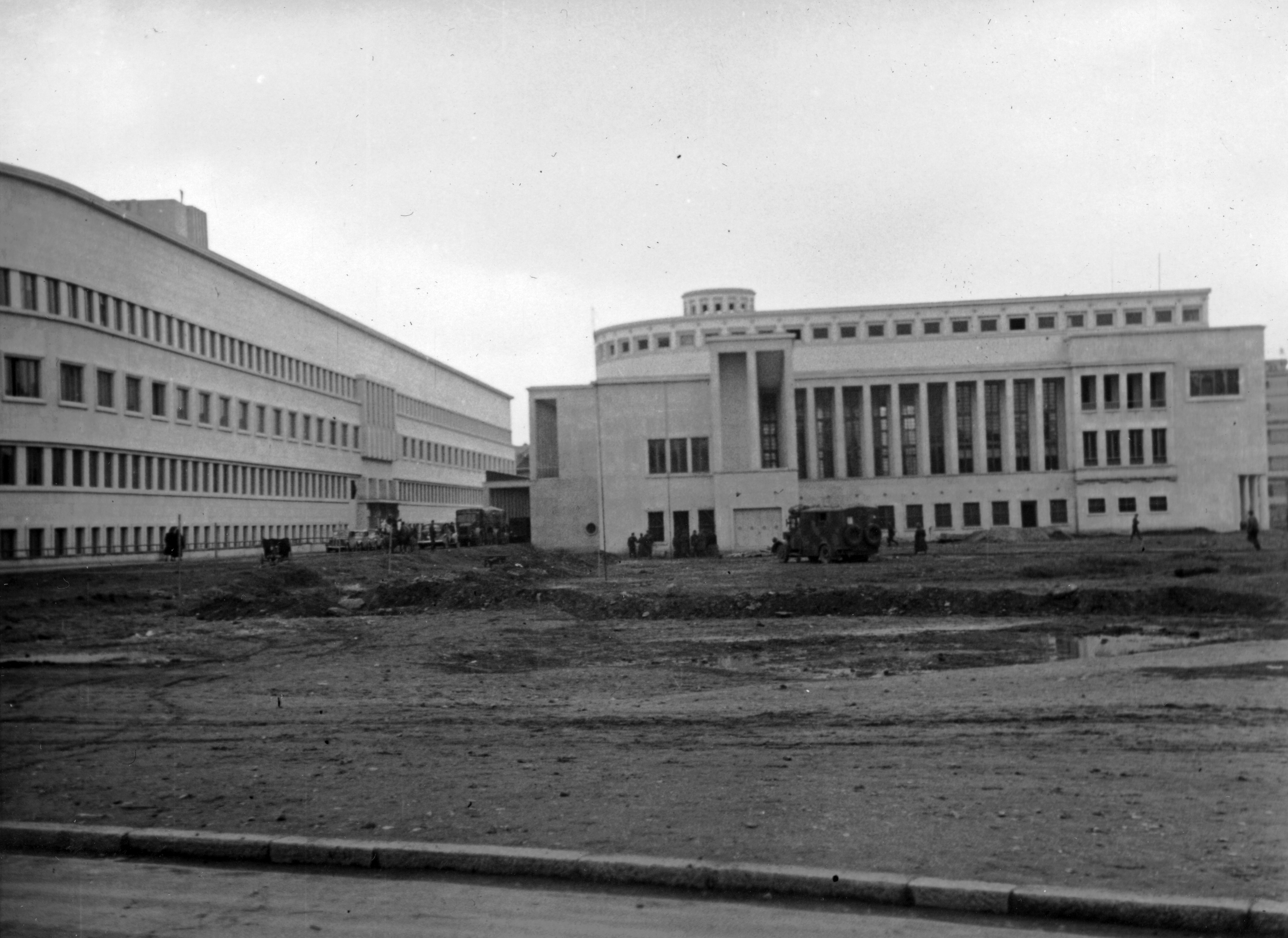
Banski dvor, 1941

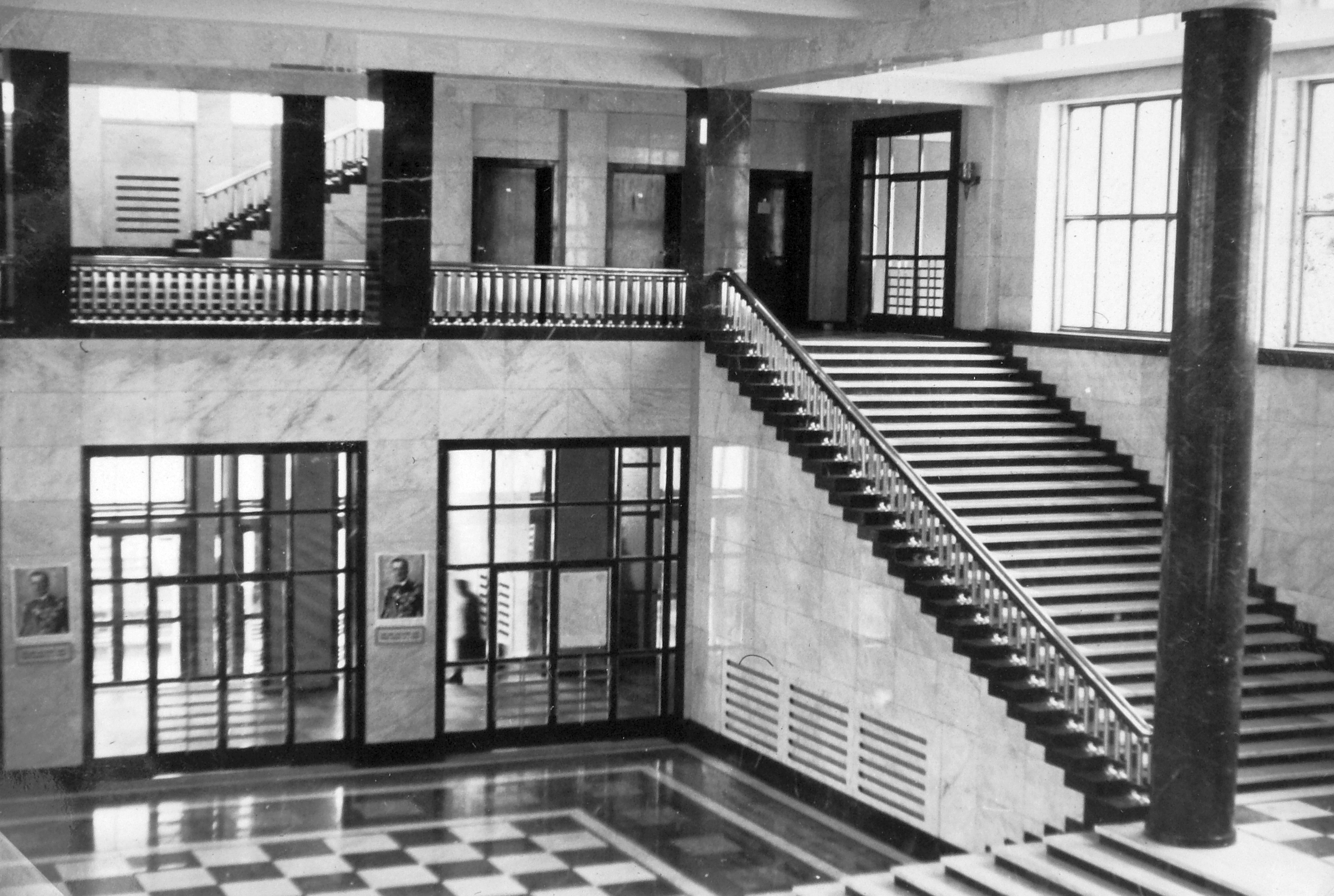
Banovina reception hall, 1942

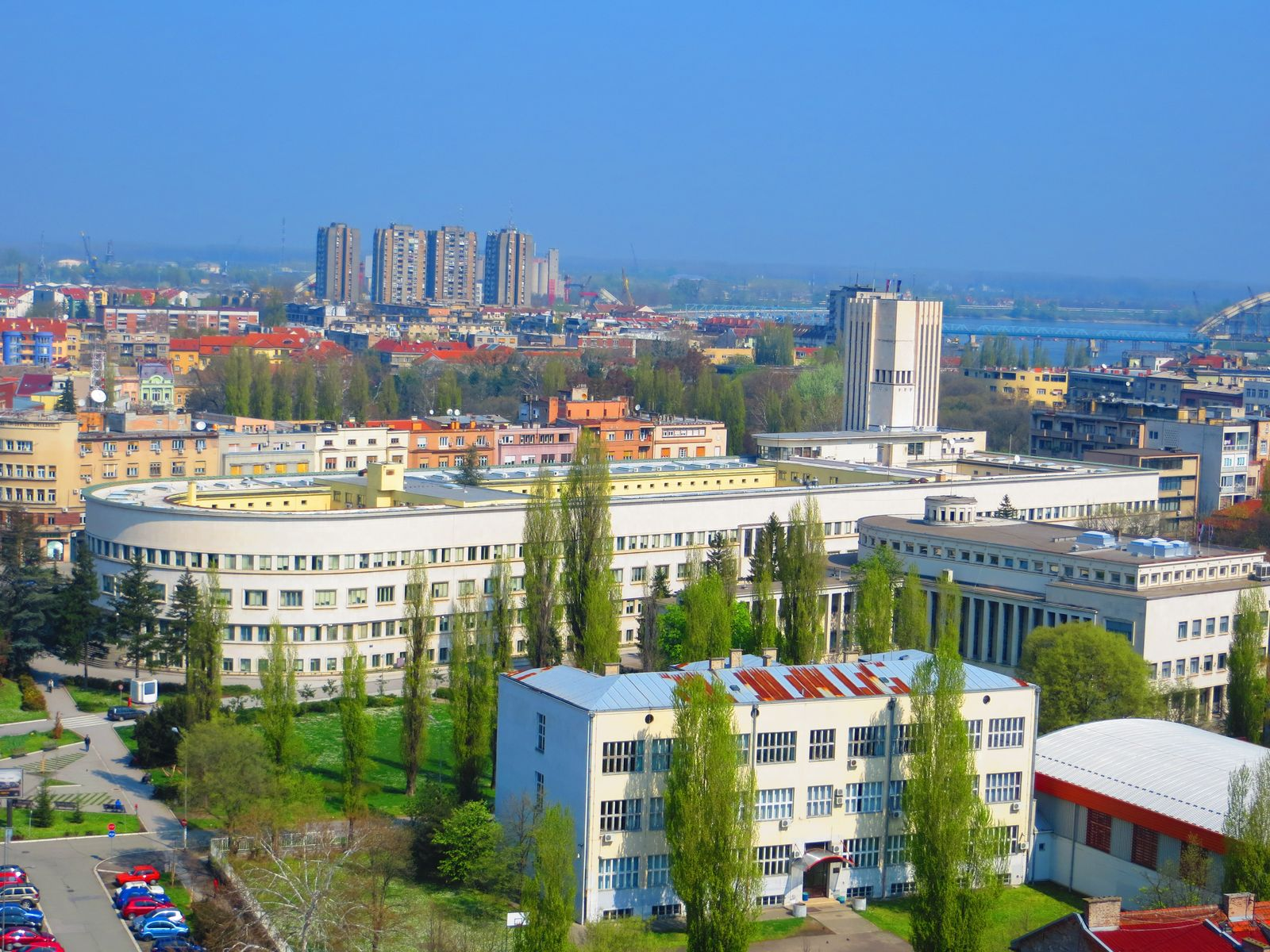
The Banovina Palace complex

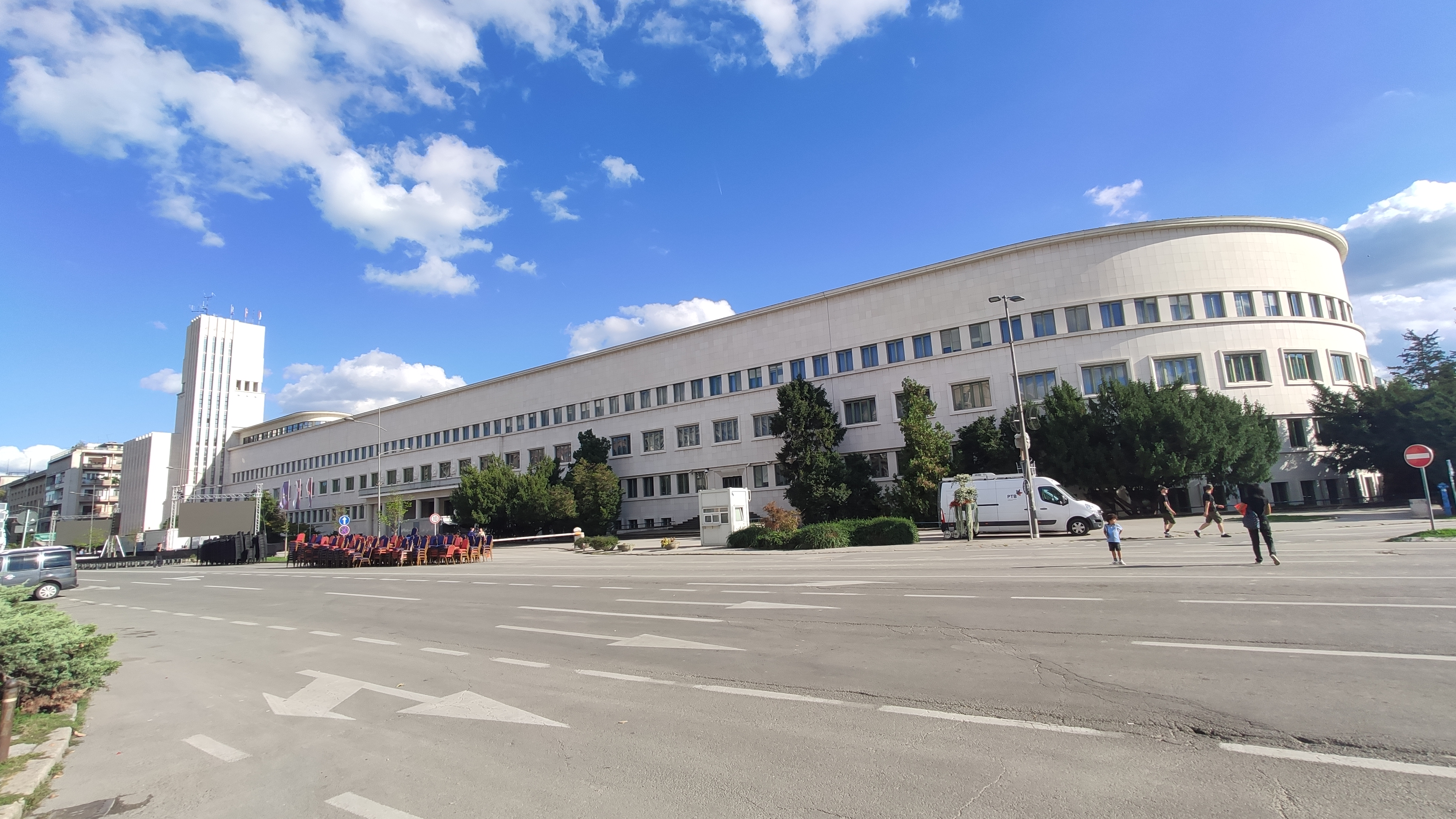
The Banovina Palace by day

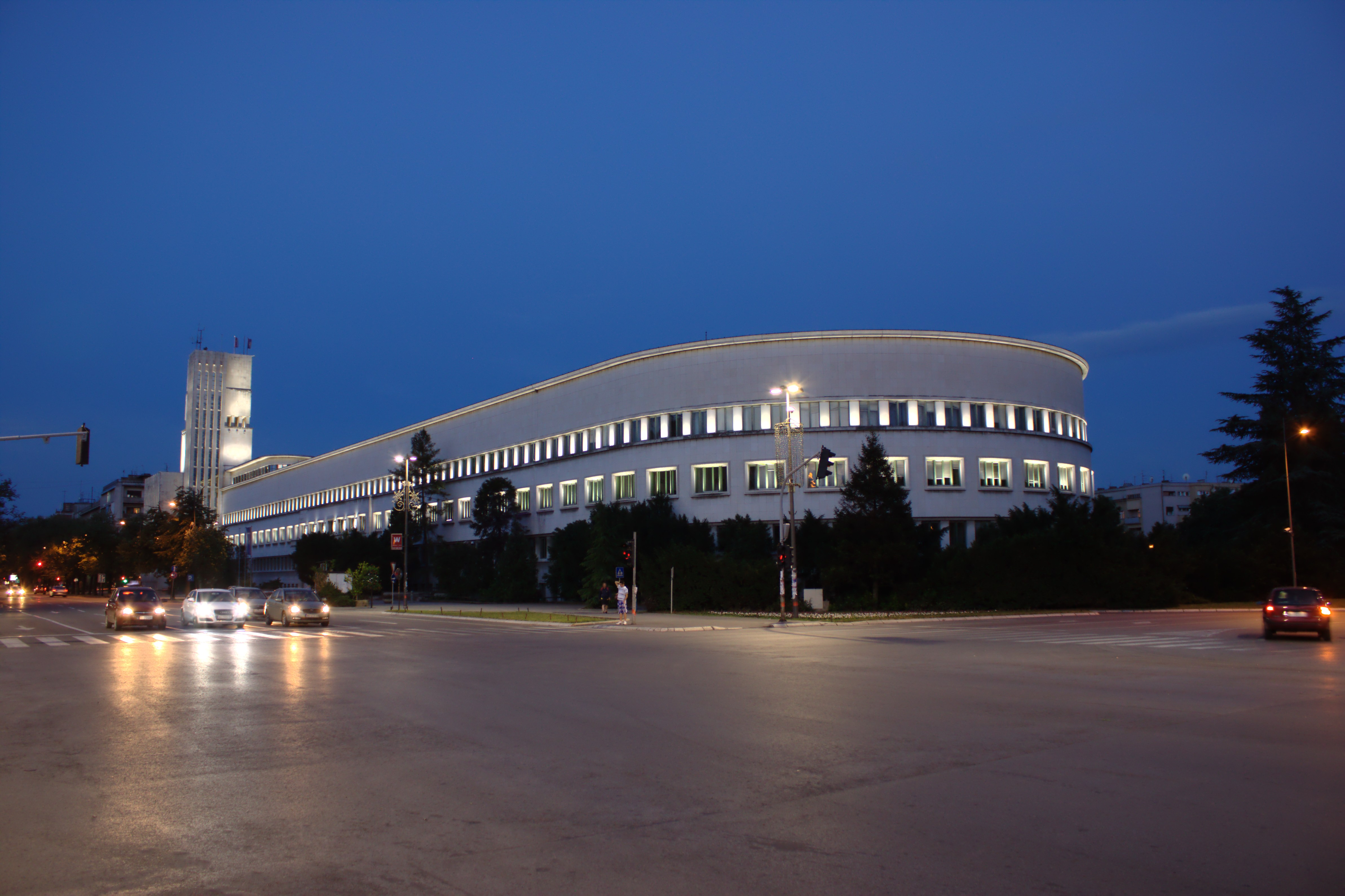
The Banovina Palace by night

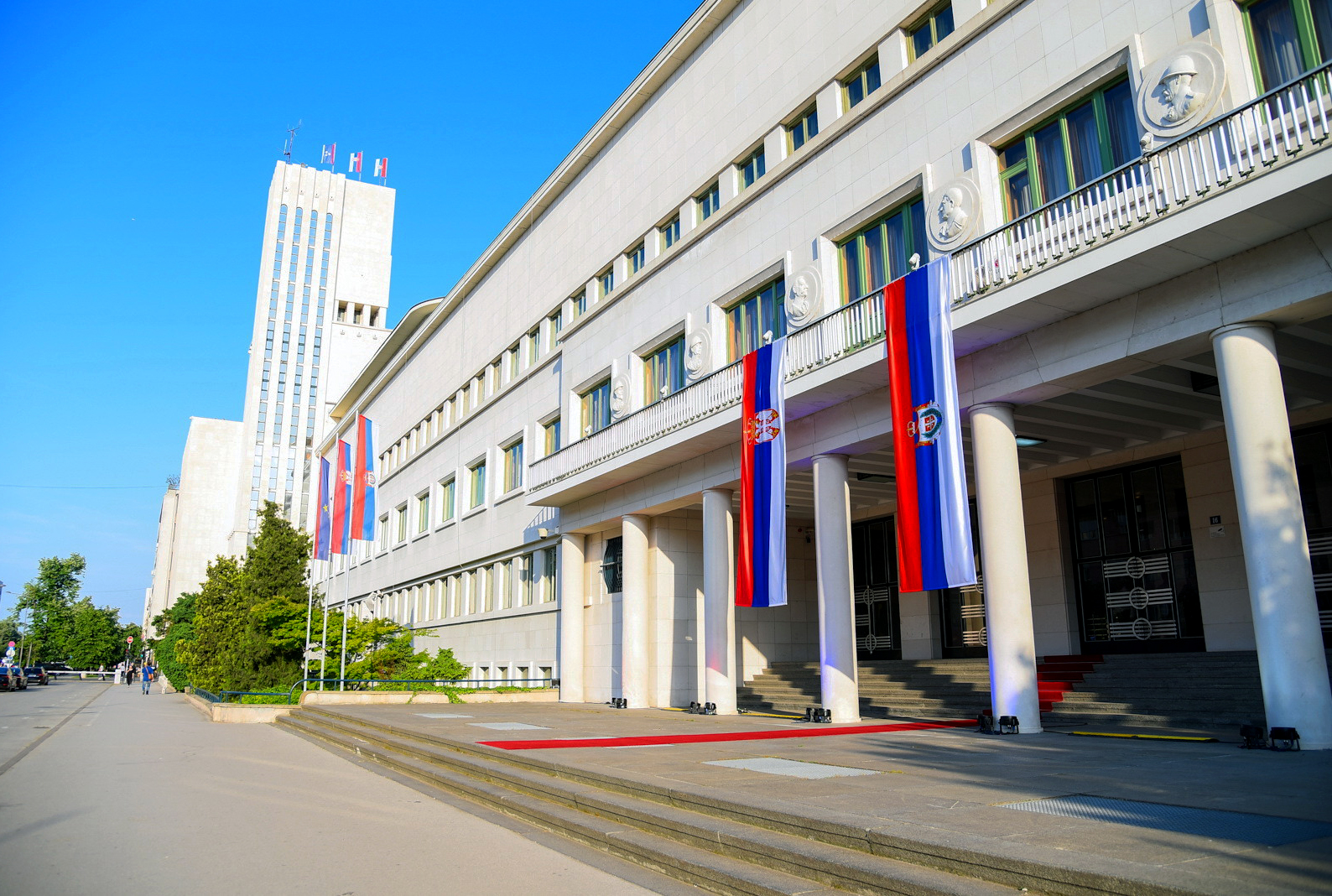
Banovina northern entrance

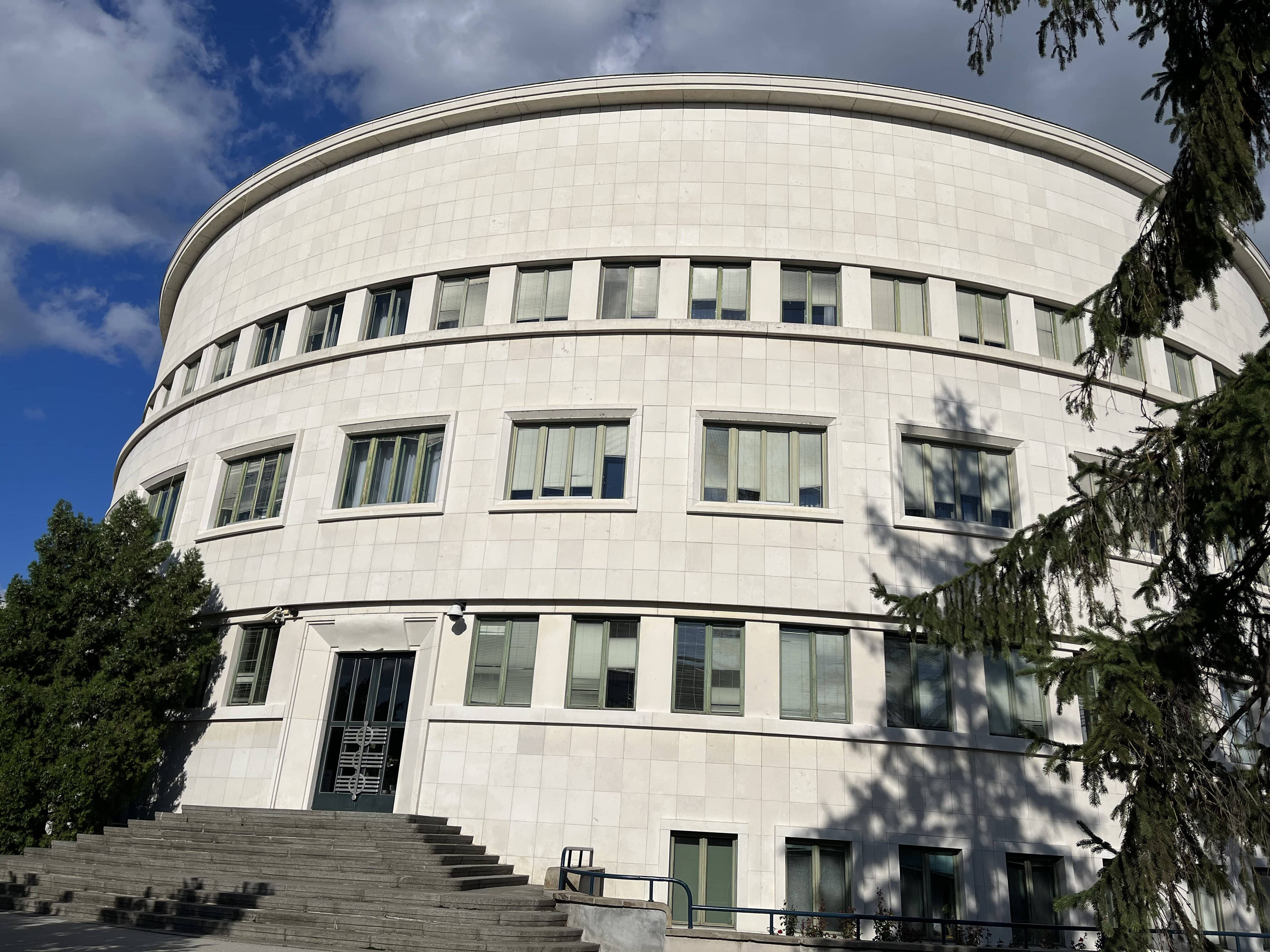
Banovina western entrance

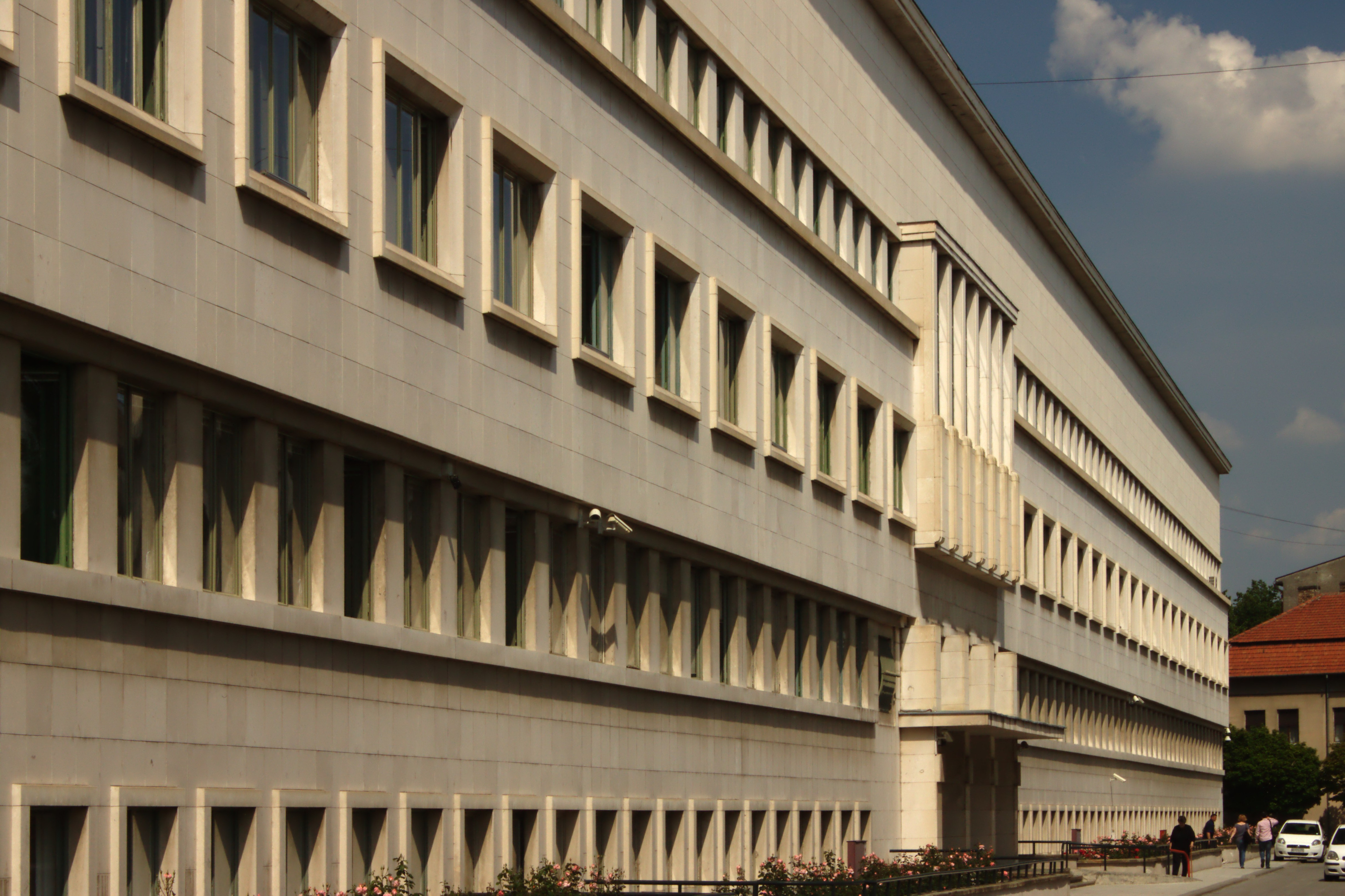
Banovina southern entrance

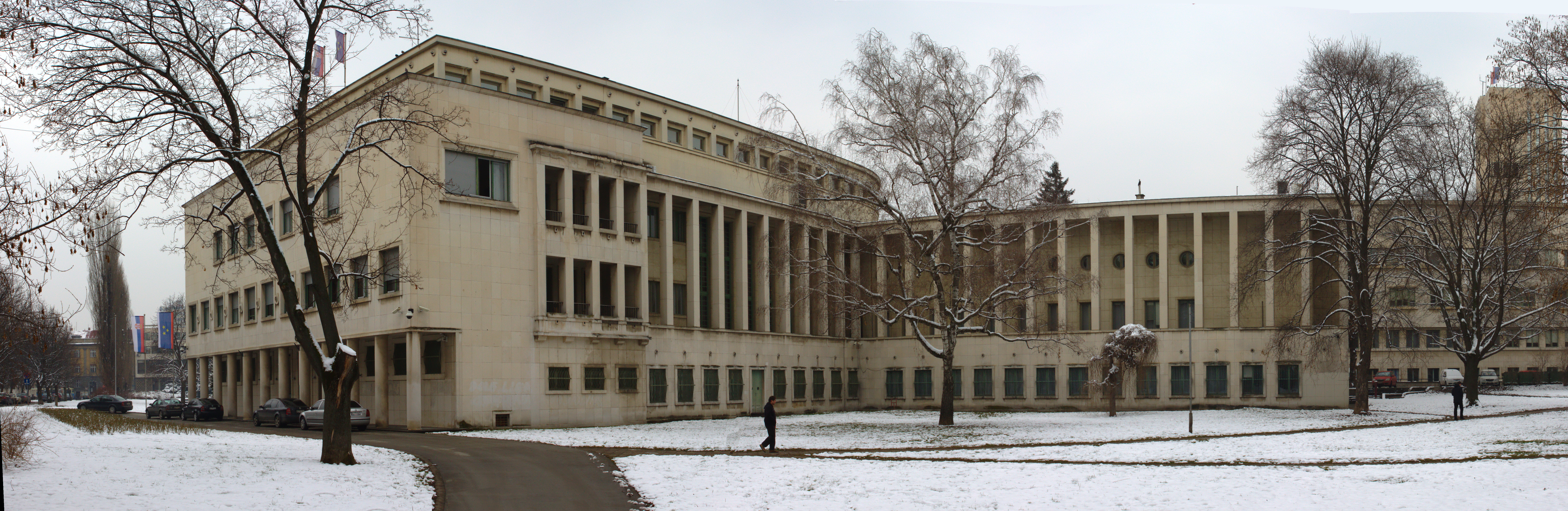
Banski dvor southern entrance

== See also ==
- House of the National Assembly (seat of the National Assembly)
- Sabor Palace (seat of Banovina of Croatia)
- Old District Building (seat of Morava Banovina)
- Banski Dvor (seat of Vrbas Banovina)
- Building of the Presidency of Bosnia and Herzegovina (seat of Drina Banovina)
- Classical Gymnasium in Zagreb (seat of Sava Banovina)
- Government Building and President's Office (seat of Drava Banovina)
- Sobranie Palace (seat of Vardar Banovina)
- Split Town Hall Building (seat of Littoral Banovina)
- Palace of Zeta Banovina on Cetinje (seat of Zeta Banovina)
