= Assembly of Vojvodina =

Provincial legislature in Serbia

Coordinates: 45.252°N 19.849°E

Assembly of Vojvodina Скупштина Аутономне Покрајине Војводине Skupština Autonomne Pokrajine Vojvodine Vajdaság Autonóm Tartomány Képviselőháza Zhromaždenie Autonómnej pokrajiny Vojvodina Adunarea Provinciei Autonome Voivodina Skupština Autonomne Pokrajine Vojvodine
- Coat of arms of Vojvodina

Type
- Type: Unicameral

History
- Founded: 1945; 81 years ago

Leadership
- President: Bálint Juhász, VMSZ/SVM since 25 April 2024
- Vice-presidents: Nemanja Zavišić, SNS; Aleksandra Maletić, SNS; Boris Novaković, SPS; Milan Subotin, SNS

Structure
- Seats: 120
- Political groups: Diagram shows the Assembly as constituted in 2024; figures below show the current parliamentary groups. Government (78): SNS-led group (62); VMSZ/SVM (9); SPS–JS (7); Supported by (5): Forward Vojvodina (5); Opposition (35): SRCE–ZLF–PSG (9); NADA (8); SSP (7); NPS–EU (6); Vojvodina with Students (5); Not in a parliamentary group (2): Independent and unaffiliated (2)
- Length of term: 4 years

Elections
- Voting system: Party-list proportional representation using the D'Hondt method with a 3% electoral threshold See Elections in Vojvodina
- Last election: 17 December 2023
- Next election: By December 2027

Meeting place
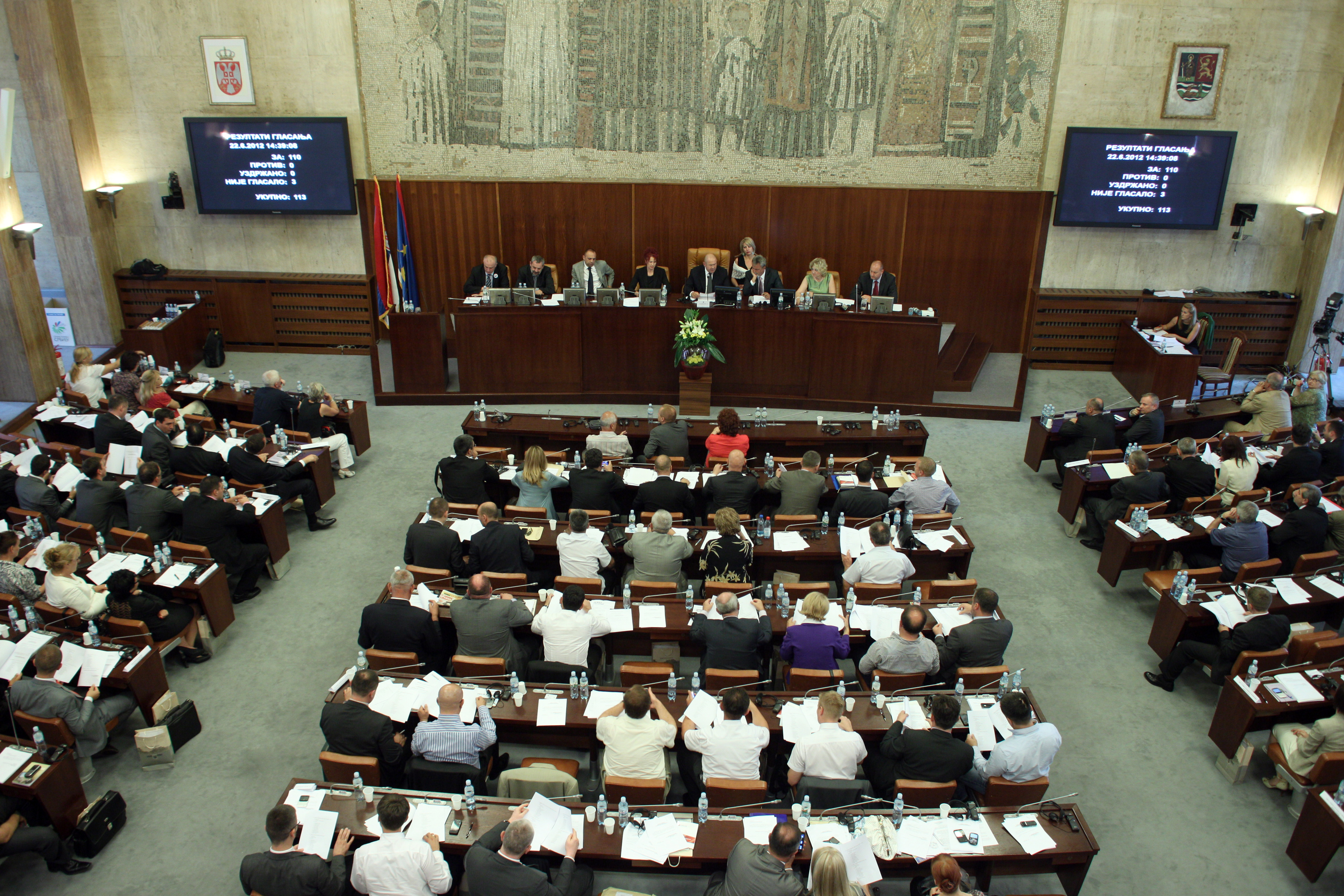
- Banski dvor, Banovina Palace; Vladike Platona 1, Novi Sad

Website
- skupstinavojvodine.gov.rs

The Assembly of Vojvodina (Serbian: Скупштина Војводине, romanized: Skupština Vojvodine), formally the Assembly of the Autonomous Province of Vojvodina (Serbian: Скупштина Аутономне Покрајине Војводине, romanized: Skupština Autonomne Pokrajine Vojvodine), is the legislative body of Vojvodina, an autonomous province of Serbia.

The assembly is composed of 120 deputies who are proportionally elected to four-year terms by secret ballot. The current assembly was elected in the 2023 Vojvodina provincial election. The assembly elects a president (speaker) who presides over the sessions, currently Bálint Juhász of the Alliance of Vojvodina Hungarians.

== Jurisdiction ==
The jurisdiction of the Assembly of Vojvodina is laid down by the Constitution of Serbia and by the Statute of Vojvodina as its supreme legal act.

The Assembly of Vojvodina does not have legislative powers stricto sensu, since it only enacts decisions, resolutions, declarations and recommendations. It elects, dismisses and controls the work of the Government of Vojvodina; approves and audits the provincial budget; decides on the borrowing of the province in accordance with national law; authorises provincial referendums; ratifies agreements with sub-national territorial units of other states in accordance with national laws; elects the provincial ombudsman; enacts acts on the establishment, competences and regulation of provincial agencies and public companies; and proposes laws and other acts to the National Assembly.

== Organisation ==
=== President and vice-presidents ===
The Assembly elects a president, who convenes and chairs its sittings and represents it, and several vice-presidents. The current president is Bálint Juhász of the Alliance of Vojvodina Hungarians, elected on 25 April 2024.

Presidium of the Assembly of Vojvodina
Position	Member	Party
President	Bálint Juhász	Alliance of Vojvodina Hungarians
Vice-president	Nemanja Zavišić	Serbian Progressive Party
Vice-president	Aleksandra Maletić	Serbian Progressive Party
Vice-president	Boris Novaković	Socialist Party of Serbia
Vice-president	Milan Subotin	Serbian Progressive Party

== Parliamentary groups ==
Parliamentary groups in the Assembly of Vojvodina
Parliamentary group	Chair	Seats
Aleksandar Vučić – Vojvodina Must Not Stop	Stanislava Hrnjak	62
Alliance of Vojvodina Hungarians	Bojan Bagi	9
Serbia Centre – Green–Left Front – Movement of Free Citizens	Mihailo Brkić	9
NADA – New DSS and Monarchists	Branislav Ristivojević	8
Party of Freedom and Justice	Robert Šebek	7
Socialist Party of Serbia – United Serbia	Aleksandra Đanković	7
People's Movement of Serbia – Ecological Uprising	Stanko Pužić	6
Forward Vojvodina	Dejan Panić	5
Vojvodina with Students	Daniel Kovačić	5
Deputies not in a parliamentary group		2
Total		120

== Seat ==
The seat of the Assembly of Vojvodina is the Banovina Palace in Novi Sad, the administrative centre of Vojvodina. It is a complex of two buildings: the larger Banovina is the seat of the Government of Vojvodina, while the smaller Banski dvor is the seat of the Assembly. The complex, designed by Dragiša Brašovan, was built between 1936 and 1940 in a modernist style with Art Deco and stripped classicism elements, as the administrative seat of the Danube Banovina.

== See also ==
- Politics of Vojvodina
- Politics of Serbia
- National Assembly of Serbia
