= Nemanja Zavišić =

Serbian politician

Nemanja Zavišić (Serbian Cyrillic: Немања Завишић; born 4 May 1992) is a politician in Serbia. He has served in the Assembly of Vojvodina since 2020 as a member of the Serbian Progressive Party and is currently a deputy speaker of the assembly.

After the elections in October 2026, Multiple affairs arose including blackmail and extorsion. Citizens of his hometown Zmajevo are included in the investigation. More information are expected soon

== Private career ==
Zavišić was born in Vrbas, Vojvodina, Republic of Serbia, in what was then the Federal Republic of Yugoslavia (which had been proclaimed seven days earlier). He holds a Bachelor of Laws degree (2016) and a Master of Laws degree (2017) from the University of Novi Sad. He interned in Novi Sad after graduation and returned to work at a law office in Vrbas from 2016 to 2019. He is also a graduate of the two-semester "politiKAS" program.

== Politician ==
=== Municipal politics ===
Zavišić received the thirteenth position on the Progressive Party's electoral list for Vrbas in the 2017 Serbian local elections and was elected when the list won a plurality victory with seventeen out of thirty-six mandates. He served as president of the assembly's mandate and immunity commission and did not seek re-election at the local level in 2020.

=== Assembly of Vojvodina ===
Zavišić received the thirty-seventh position on the Progressive Party's Aleksandar Vučić — For Our Children list in the 2020 Vojvodina provincial election and was elected when the list won a majority victory with seventy-six out of 120 mandates. He was chosen as a deputy speaker of the assembly in July 2020 and also serves as a member of the committee on regulations and the committee on issues of the constitutional and legal status of the province.

In March 2026, Zavišić sparked intense public controversy after publishing a social media statement calling all Croats Ustaše. The post was a reaction to Croatian singer Toni Cetinski cancelling a concert at the SPENS arena in Novi Sad, following unsubstantiated claims by Croatian veterans' groups that the venue served as a concentration camp during the Yugoslav wars. Zavišić’s rhetoric was condemned by Tomislav Žigmanov, president of Democratic Alliance of Croats in Vojvodina, who described it as a dehumanization of an entire ethnic group. Despite widespread condemnation from the public, legal experts Zavišić doubled down on his position, stating that he "absolutely did not repent".
