= Aleksandra Maletić =

Serbian politician

Aleksandra Maletić (Serbian Cyrillic: Александра Малетић; born 2 January 1982) is a politician in Serbia. She served in the National Assembly of Serbia from 2014 to 2020 and is now a vice-president (i.e., deputy speaker) of the Assembly of Vojvodina. Maletić is a member of the Serbian Progressive Party.

== Early life and career ==
Maletić was born in Novi Sad, Vojvodina, in what was then the Socialist Republic of Serbia in the Socialist Federal Republic of Yugoslavia. She is a graduate of the University of Novi Sad Department of Philosophy, with a degree in psychology.

== Politician ==
=== Municipal politics ===
Maletić received the ninth position on the Progressive Party's electoral list in for the Novi Sad municipal assembly in the 2012 Serbian local elections and was elected when the list won fifteen mandates. The Progressives initially served in opposition after the election but formed a new coalition government later in 2012. Maletić served as a supporter of the administration and did not seek re-election at the local level in 2016.

=== National Assembly ===
Maletić was first elected to the National Assembly in the 2014 Serbian parliamentary election after receiving the seventy-fifth position on the Progressive Party's Aleksandar Vučić — Future We Believe In list, which won a majority victory with 158 out of 250 mandates. She was promoted to the forty-second position on the successor Aleksandar Vučić – Serbia Is Winning list for the 2016 parliamentary election and was re-elected when the list won 131 mandates.

During the 2016–20 parliament, Maletić was a member of the parliamentary committee on labour, social issues, social inclusion, and poverty reduction; a member of Serbia's delegation to the Parliamentary Assembly of the Mediterranean; the head of Serbia's parliamentary friendship group with Ireland; and a member of the parliamentary friendship groups with Azerbaijan, Bosnia and Herzegovina, China, Cyprus, France, Greece, Israel, Italy, Romania, Russia, Slovakia, and the United Kingdom.

=== Provincial politics ===
Maletić was not a candidate in the 2020 parliamentary election but instead received the fifth position on the Progressive Party's list in the 2020 Vojvodina provincial election. She was elected when the list won a majority victory with seventy-six of 120 mandates. Maletić was chosen as a deputy speaker of the assembly in July 2020. She is also a member of the assembly committee on European integration and interregional cooperation and the committee on administrative and mandatory issues.

She is also a member of the Chamber of Regions in the Council of Europe's Congress of Local and Regional Authorities. She is the second vice-president of the bureau of the congress and a member of the current affairs committee, and she serves in the European People's Party caucus.
