= Danube Banovina =

Banovina or province of the Kingdom of Yugoslavia

Coordinates: 45°20′N 19°50′E

Danube Banovina Dunavska banovina Дунавска бановина
- Banovina of the Kingdom of Yugoslavia
- 1929–1941
- Flag Coat of arms

- The Danube Banovina in 1941.
- Capital: Novi Sad (1929–1941); Smederevo (1941)
- Government
  - Type: Devolved autonomous banate
- Monarch
  - 1929–1934: Alexander I
  - 1934–1941: Peter II
- Ban
  - 1929–1930: Daka Popović
  - 1941: Milorad Vlaškalin
- History
  - Established: 3 October 1929
  - 1931 Yugoslav Constitution: 3 September 1931
  - Invasion of Yugoslavia: 17 April 1941
Preceded by
Banat, Bačka and Baranja
Succeeded by
Territory of the Military Commander in Serbia
Autonomous Province of Vojvodina (1945–1963)
People's Republic of Serbia
People's Republic of Croatia
- Today part of: Croatia; Serbia

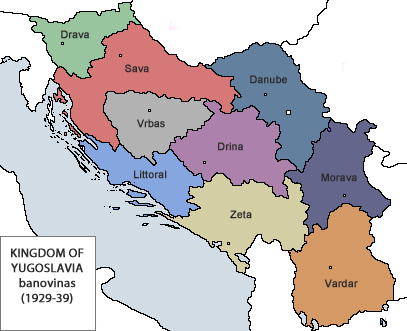
Map of Yugoslav banovinas in 1929 (The Danube Banovina is #7)

Danube Banovina or Danube Banate (Serbo-Croatian: Dunavska banovina / Дунавска бановина), was a banovina (or province) of the Kingdom of Yugoslavia between 1929 and 1941. This province consisted of the geographical regions of Syrmia, Bačka, Banat, Baranya, Šumadija, and Braničevo. The capital city of the Danube Banovina was Novi Sad. The province was named after the Danube River.

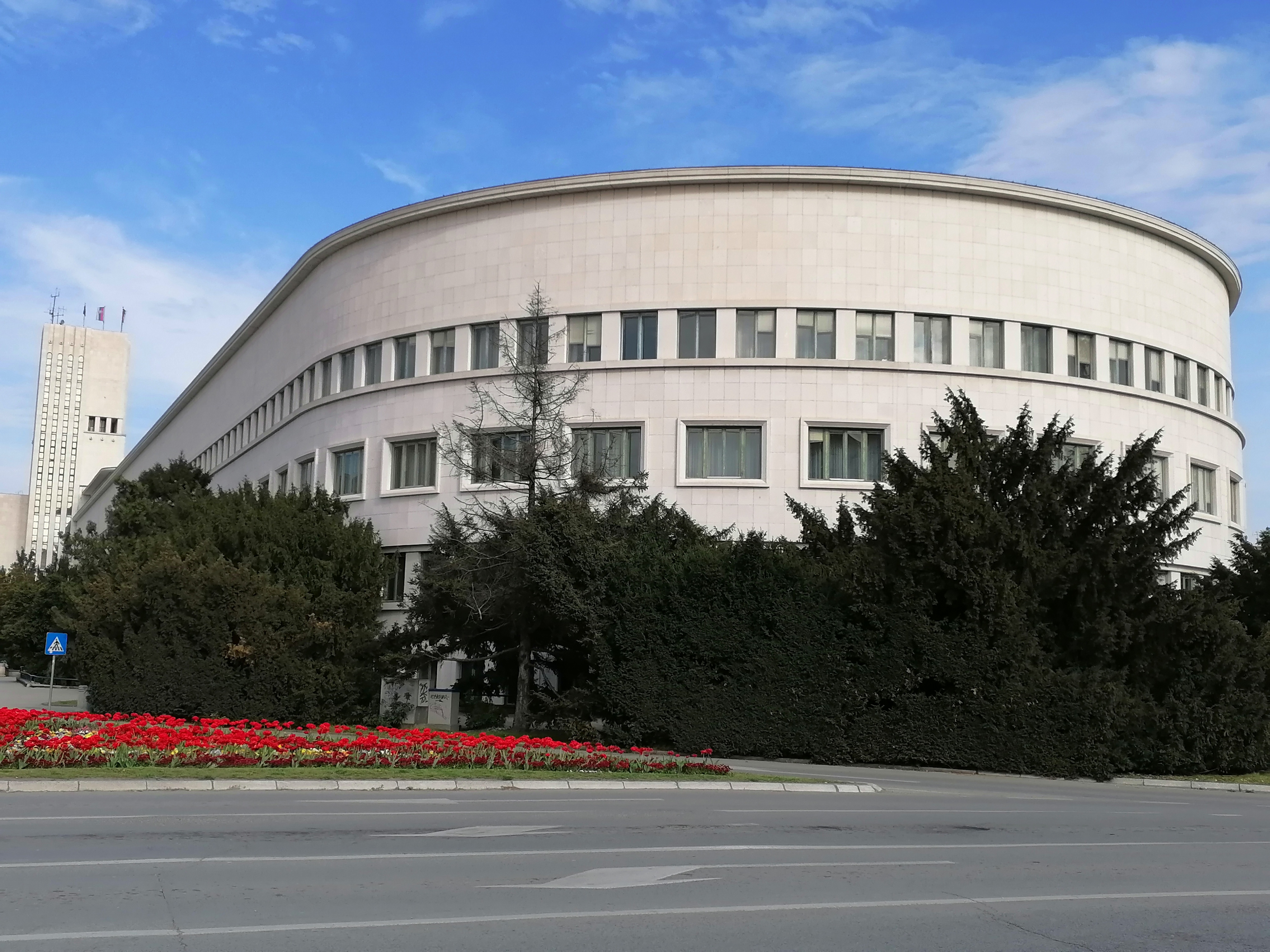
Banovina Palace was the administrative seat of Banate. Today it houses the government and parliament of AP Vojvodina

== Population ==
According to the 1931 census, the Danube Banovina had 2,387,495 inhabitants. The population of this region was composed of:

- Serbs and Croats (56.9%)
- Hungarians (18.2%)
- Germans (16.3%)

== Borders ==
According to the 1931 Constitution of the Kingdom of Yugoslavia,

- "The Danube Banovina is bounded on the south-west by the boundaries ... of the Sava and Drina Banovinas, on the north and north-east by the State frontiers with Hungary and Romania, up to the point where the latter frontier meets the Danube. The boundary then follows the course of the Danube up to the eastern boundary of the district of Ram and then turns along the south-eastern boundary of the Požarevac district. It then follows the eastern boundaries of the districts of Morava, Lepenica, Kragujevac, and Gruža, as far as the Dulenski Crni Vrh (hill 919), turning towards the Gledic Mountains and thence over the Krečane (hill 760) and Brzak (hill 822) up to the boundary of the Drina Banovina on Mount Kotlenik, near Crni Vrh (hill 768)."

== History ==
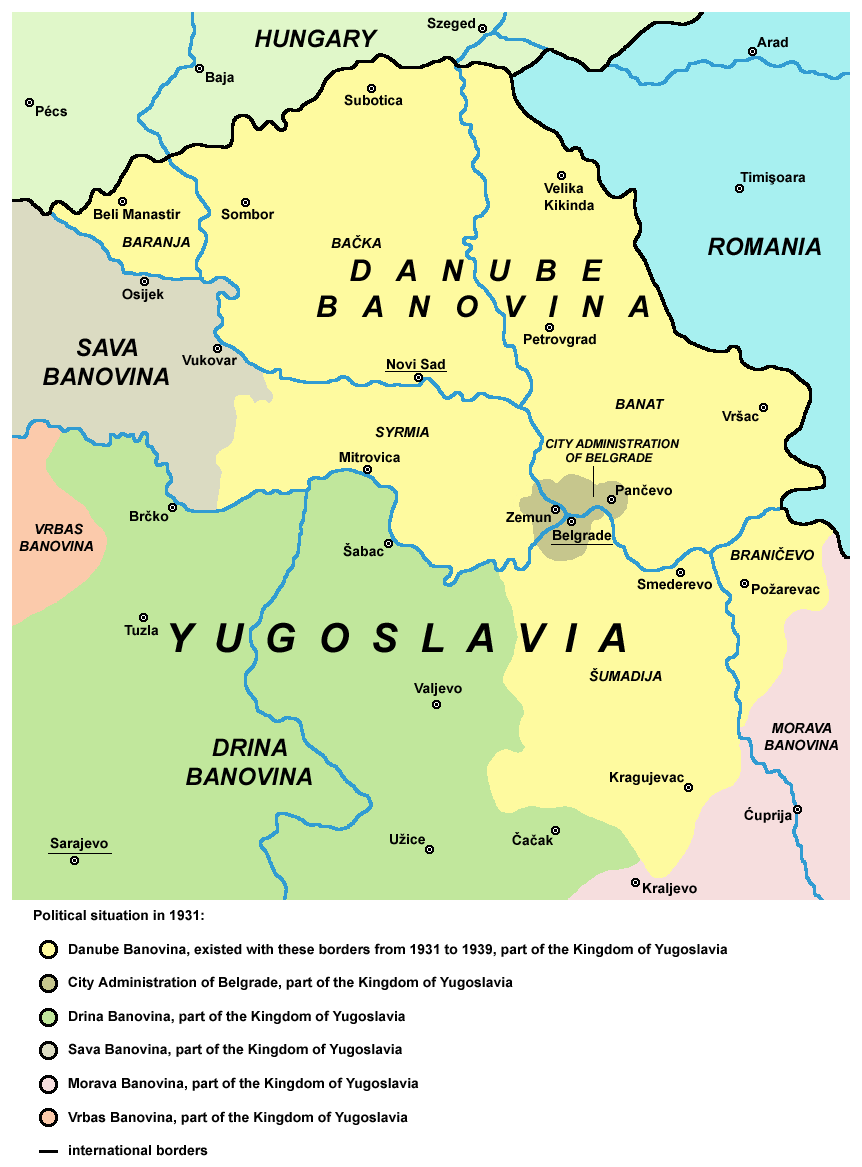
Danube Banovina in 1931.

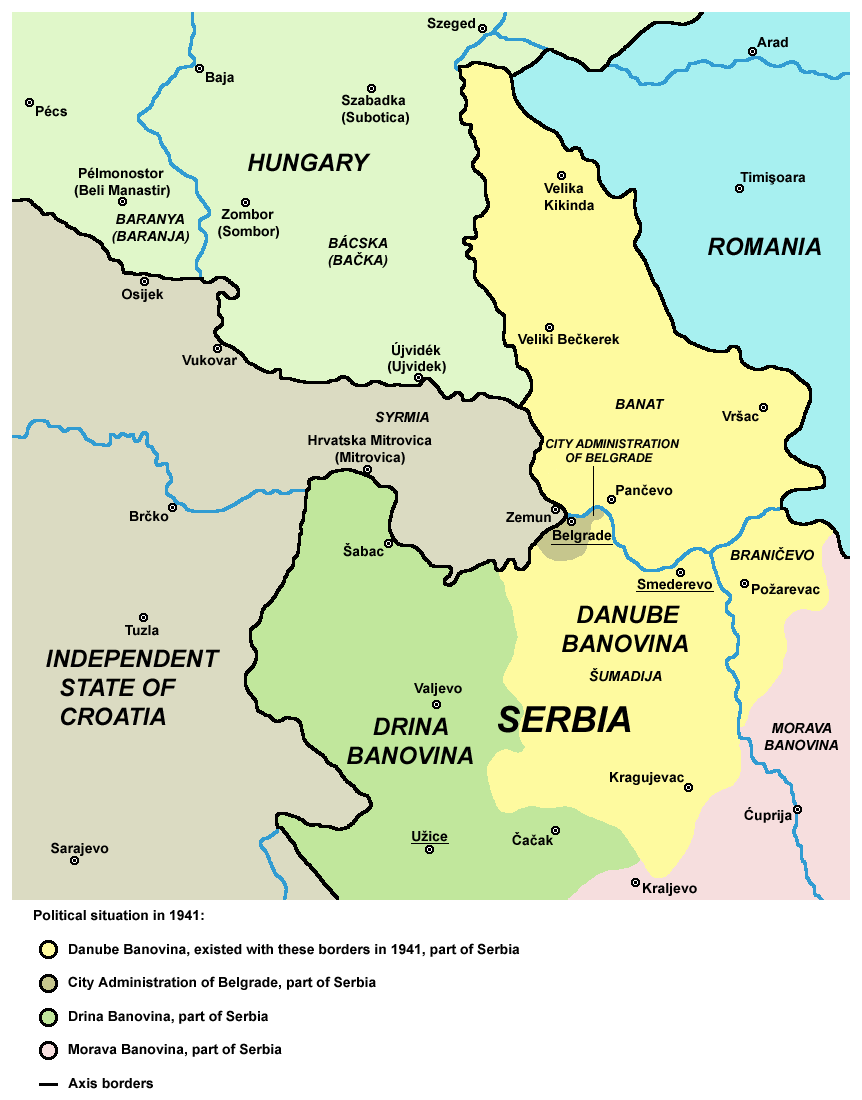
Danube Banovina after Axis invasion.

In 1931, Mitrovica and Šid districts were transferred from Drina Banovina to Danube Banovina.

In 1939, when the new Banovina of Croatia was formed, Šid and Ilok districts were transferred from the Danube Banovina to that of Croatia.

In 1941, the World War II Axis powers occupied the Danube Banovina. Bačka and Baranja regions were attached to Hungary, while Syrmia was attached to the Independent State of Croatia. The remainder of the former Danube Banovina (including Banat, Šumadija, and Braničevo) were part of the Territory of the Military Commander in Serbia. However, Banat had autonomy as a region ruled by its ethnic German minority.

In 1945, the region was restored as a province of Serbia within a federal Socialist Yugoslavia. The province was officially renamed as Vojvodina, its historical name, with the capital at the city of Novi Sad. The new province consisted of Syrmia, Banat and Bačka regions. Baranja was included in the People's Republic of Croatia, while Šumadija and Braničevo were included in Serbia Proper.

== Cities ==
Some large cities of the Danube Banovina were:

- Novi Sad
- Subotica
- Petrovgrad (now Zrenjanin)
- Sombor
- Velika Kikinda (now Kikinda)
- Mitrovica (now Sremska Mitrovica)
- Kragujevac
- Smederevo
- Požarevac

== Bans of Danube Banovina (1929–1941) ==
- David Daka Popović (1929–1930)
- Radoslav Dunjić (1930)
- Svetomir Matić (1930–1931)
- Milan Nikolić (1931–1933)
- Dobrica Matković (1933–1935)
- Milojko Vasović (1935)
- Svetislav Paunović (1935–1936)
- Svetislav Rajić (1936–1939)
- Jovan Radivojević (1939–1940)
- Branko Kijurina (1940–1941)
- Milorad Vlaškalin (1941)

== See also ==
- Vojvodina
- Administrative divisions of Yugoslavia

== References and further reading ==
- "Dunavska banovina", Enciklopedija Novog Sada, sveska 7, urednik Dr Dušan Popov, Novi Sad, 1996.
- The Constitution of the Kingdom of Yugoslavia
