= Government of Vojvodina =

Provincial Government of Vojvodina
- Покрајинска влада Војводине; Vajdaság Tartományi Kormány (Hungarian); Pokrajinská vláda Vojvodiny (Slovak); Guvernul Provincial Voivodina (Romanian); Pokrajinska vlada Vojvodine (Croatian); Покраїнска влада Войводини (Pannonian Rusyn)

Overview
- Polity: Autonomous Province of Vojvodina
- Leader: President of the Provincial Government
- Responsible to: Assembly of Vojvodina
- Headquarters: Banovina Palace, Bulevar Mihajla Pupina 16, Novi Sad
- Website: vojvodina.gov.rs

The Government of Vojvodina (Serbian: Влада Војводине, romanized: Vlada Vojvodine), formally the Provincial Government of the Autonomous Province of Vojvodina (Serbian: Покрајинска влада Аутономне Покрајине Војводине, romanized: Pokrajinska vlada Autonomne Pokrajine Vojvodine), is the executive body of Vojvodina, province of Serbia.

The affairs of the Provincial Government are decided by the Cabinet, which is led by the President of the Provincial Government, currently Maja Gojković of the Serbian Progressive Party. For its actions the Government is accountable to the Assembly of Vojvodina.

== Jurisdiction ==
The rights and duties of the government are laid down by the Constitution of Serbia and by the Statute of Vojvodina as its supreme legal act.

The jurisdiction of provincial government include regional and urban planning; environmental protection; management of forestry, fishing, and hunting; management of animal husbandry and veterinary medicine; management of inland waterways and irrigation canals; provincial language policy for ethnic minorities; promotion and development of tourism.

== Current cabinet ==
Cabinet is composed of the president, vice-presidents, and secretaries.

Position	Portfolio	Name	Party
President		Maja Gojković	SNS
Vice President	General affairs	Sandra Božić	SNS
Vice President	Health	Milan Popov	SPS
Vice President	Agriculture, water management, and forestry	Vladimir Galić	SNS
Vice President	Legal affairs and administration	Robert Otot	VMSZ/SVM
Vice President	Ethnic minorities	Tomislav Žigmanov	DSHV (SNS-nominated)
Secretary	Finances	Aleksandra Radak	SNS
Secretary	Urban planning and environmental protection	Nemanja Erceg	SNS
Secretary	Energy, construction, and transport	Bojan Vranjković	SNS
Secretary	Higher education and scientific research	Branko Markoski	SNS
Secretary	Culture, public service broadcasting, religious affairs	Aleksandra Ćirić Bošković	SNS
Secretary	Economy and tourism	Nenad Ivanišević	SDPS (SNS-nominated)
Secretary	Social policy, demography, and gender equality	Predrag Vuletić	PS (SNS-nominated)
Secretary	Regional development, inter-regional cooperation, and local government	Aleksandar Sofić	SNS
Secretary	Sports and youth	Dane Basta	SNS

== Seat ==
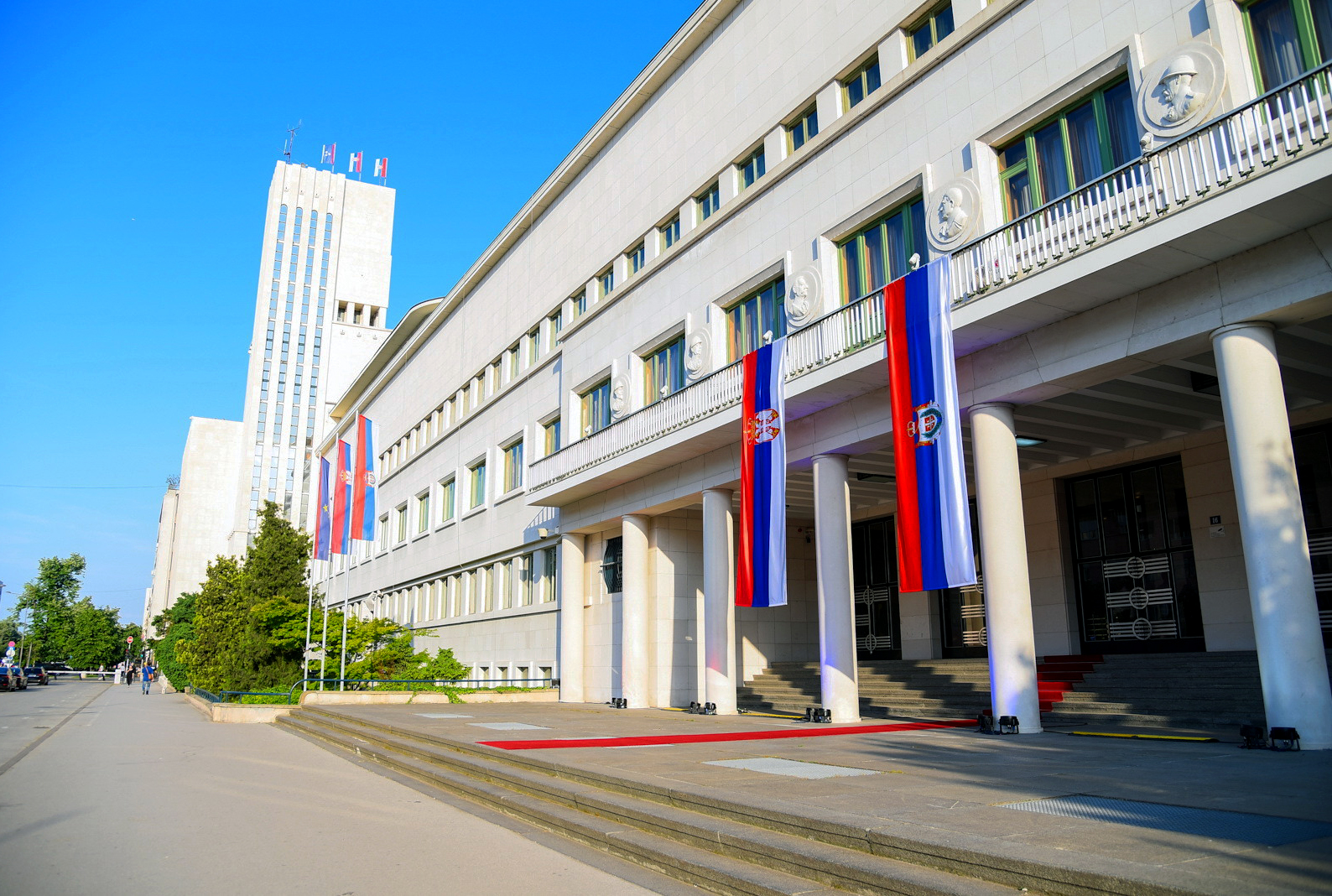
The Banovina Palace

Seat of the Government of Vojvodina is the Banovina Palace, in Novi Sad, the administrative centre of Vojvodina. It is a complex consisting of two buildings. The larger Banovina serves as the seat of the Government of Vojvodina, while the smaller Banski dvor serves as the seat of the Assembly of Vojvodina. The complex, designed by Dragiša Brašovan, was constructed between 1936 and 1940 in modernist style (with art deco and stripped classicism elements) as the administrative seat of the Danube Banovina.

== See also ==
- Politics of Vojvodina
- Politics of Serbia
- Government of Serbia
