= Vladimir Galić =

Serbian politician (born 1972)

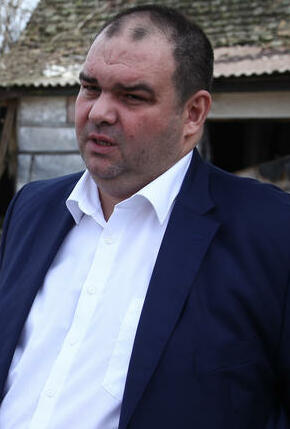

Vladimir Galić (Serbian Cyrillic: Владимир Галић; born 1972) is a politician in Serbia. He has been a member of the Vojvodina government since 2016 and is currently one of its four vice-presidents, with ministerial responsibility for urbanization and environmental protection. Once a prominent figure of the Democratic Party of Serbia (Demokratska stranka Srbije, DSS), he is now a member of the Serbian Progressive Party (Srpska napredna stranka, SNS).

== Early life and private career ==
Galić was born in Kikinda, Vojvodina, in what was then the Socialist Republic of Serbia in the Socialist Federal Republic of Yugoslavia. He was raised in the community and subsequently graduated from the University of Novi Sad Faculty of Law. He has been practising law since 1998 and has a law office in Novi Sad.

== Politician ==
=== Democratic Party of Serbia ===
Galić received the seventy-first position on the DSS's electoral list in the 2003 Serbian parliamentary election. The list won fifty-three mandates, and he was not included in its assembly delegation. (From 2000 to 2011, mandates in Serbian parliamentary elections were awarded to successful parties or coalitions rather than individual candidates, and it was common practice for the mandates to be assigned out of numerical order. Galić could have been awarded a mandate despite his list position, but in the event he was not.)

The DSS became the dominant party in Serbia's coalition government after the 2003 election, and Galić held a series of government positions between 2004 and 2008, when the party moved into opposition. He was appointed as assistant minister for state administration and local self-government in the government of Serbia in June 2004; his responsibilities in his role included harmonizing Serbia's regulations with those of the European Union. He stood down from this position in October 2005 and two months later was appointed as an advisor to Serbian prime minister Vojislav Koštunica. He later served as the director of Serbia's privatization agency from October 2005 until May 2007, at which time he was appointed to a second term as advisor to Koštunica, when the latter was confirmed for a second term as prime minister following the 2007 parliamentary election. He remained in this role until February 2008. Galić also served as president of the management board for Vojvođanska banka from 2004 to 2006.

=== Serbian Progressive Party ===
Galić subsequently left the DSS and joined the Progressive Party. He received the thirteenth position on the latter's Let's Get Vojvodina Moving electoral list in the 2012 provincial election and was elected when the list won fourteen mandates. (Following a 2011 reform, mandates were awarded in numerical order to candidates on successful lists.) The election was won by the Democratic Party (Demokratska stranka, DS) and its allies, and Galić served in opposition for the next four years. In 2014, he was appointed as part of a working group responsible for harmonizing the Statute of the Autonomous Province of Vojvodina with the Constitution of Serbia.

He also received the fourth position on the Progressive Party's list for the Novi Sad city assembly in the 2012 Serbian local elections (held concurrently with that year's provincial election) and was elected when the list won fifteen mandates. He resigned his city mandate on 29 June 2012.

Galić was given the thirty-second position on the Progressive Party's list for the 2016 provincial election and was re-elected when the list won a majority victory with sixty-three out of 120 mandates. The Progressives became the dominant party in Vojvodina's provincial government after the election, and Galić was appointed as secretary for urbanization and environmental protection. In this role, he has overseen the Fruška Gora Corridor linking Novi Sad and Ruma. In 2019, he introduced a plan to plant ten thousand seedlings of popular, birch, black pine, oak, and catalpa trees across the province in a one-week period.

The Progressives won an increased majority in the 2020 provincial election. A new provincial administration was formed after the vote, and Galić was promoted to the role of vice-president of the provincial government. He also retains responsibility for urbanization and environmental protection.
