= Daka Popović =

Serbian engineer and politician

David "Daka" Popović OSS
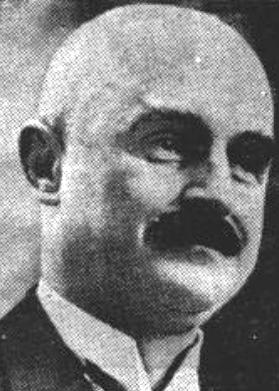

Kingdom of Yugoslavia Senator from Danube Banovina
- In office 3 January 1932 – 12 November 1939
- Preceded by: Position established
- Succeeded by: Branko Ilić

Ban of Danube Banovina
- In office 3 October 1929 – 16 January 1930
- Preceded by: Position established
- Succeeded by: Radoslav Dunjić

Minister of Land Reform
- In office 27 July 1928 – 9 January 1929
- Preceded by: Vladimir Andrić
- Succeeded by: Ministry disestablished

Personal details
- Born: 28 December 1886 Novi Sad, Austria-Hungary
- Died: 17 February 1967 (aged 80) Novi Sad, Yugoslavia
- Children: Dušan, Gavro
- Education: Royal Joseph Polytechnic
- Awards: Order of St. Sava, IV class, Government of Kingdom of Yugoslavia (1927)

Military service
- Allegiance: Austria-Hungary (1914–1918)
- Battles/wars: World War I: Serbian front (WIA); Romanian front; Italian front

David "Daka" Popović (Serbian Cyrillic: Давид "Дака" Поповић; 28 December 1886 – 17 February 1967) was a Serbian engineer, army officer, architect, journalist, historian, and a politician who served as the first Ban of Danube Banovina, Minister of Land Reform and a senator of Senate of Kingdom of Yugoslavia.

== Biography ==
=== Early life and education ===
Daka Popović was born on 28 December 1886 in Novi Sad where he earned his primary education. He went to a high school in Szeged and he graduated in 1913 from Royal Joseph Polytechnic, today known as Budapest University of Technology and Economics. During his studies in Budapest he worked as an illustrator for Engineering Papers magazine and engaged in athletics. He began practicing engineering in Pest after he graduated.

=== Mobilization in World War 1 ===
Popović was drafted to fight for Austria-Hungary in Summer of 1914, he was sent to fight on Serbian front. In Autumn of 1914, he was heavily wounded during a battle and he was sent back to Hungary to recover. In 1916, he became an officer of engineer corps and was sent to Romanian front, where he worked on re-construction of bridges and restorations of army communications. He was later transferred to the Italian front where he remained until the end of the war.

=== Architectural career ===
After the World War I, Popović returned to Novi Sad where he got a job in Construction Directorate of the city. He was sent to Subotica where he worked on plans for railroad renewal in Vojvodina. For his work in Subotica he was awarded with Order of St. Sava of IV class. In 1921, Popović started his own company called "Engineer Daka Popović". His company constructed many private houses, several residential buildings and two churches. Nikola Mirkov, an engineer who created plans for large expansions Danube–Tisa–Danube Canal, worked in Daka's company. Daka retreated from the construction business in 1941.

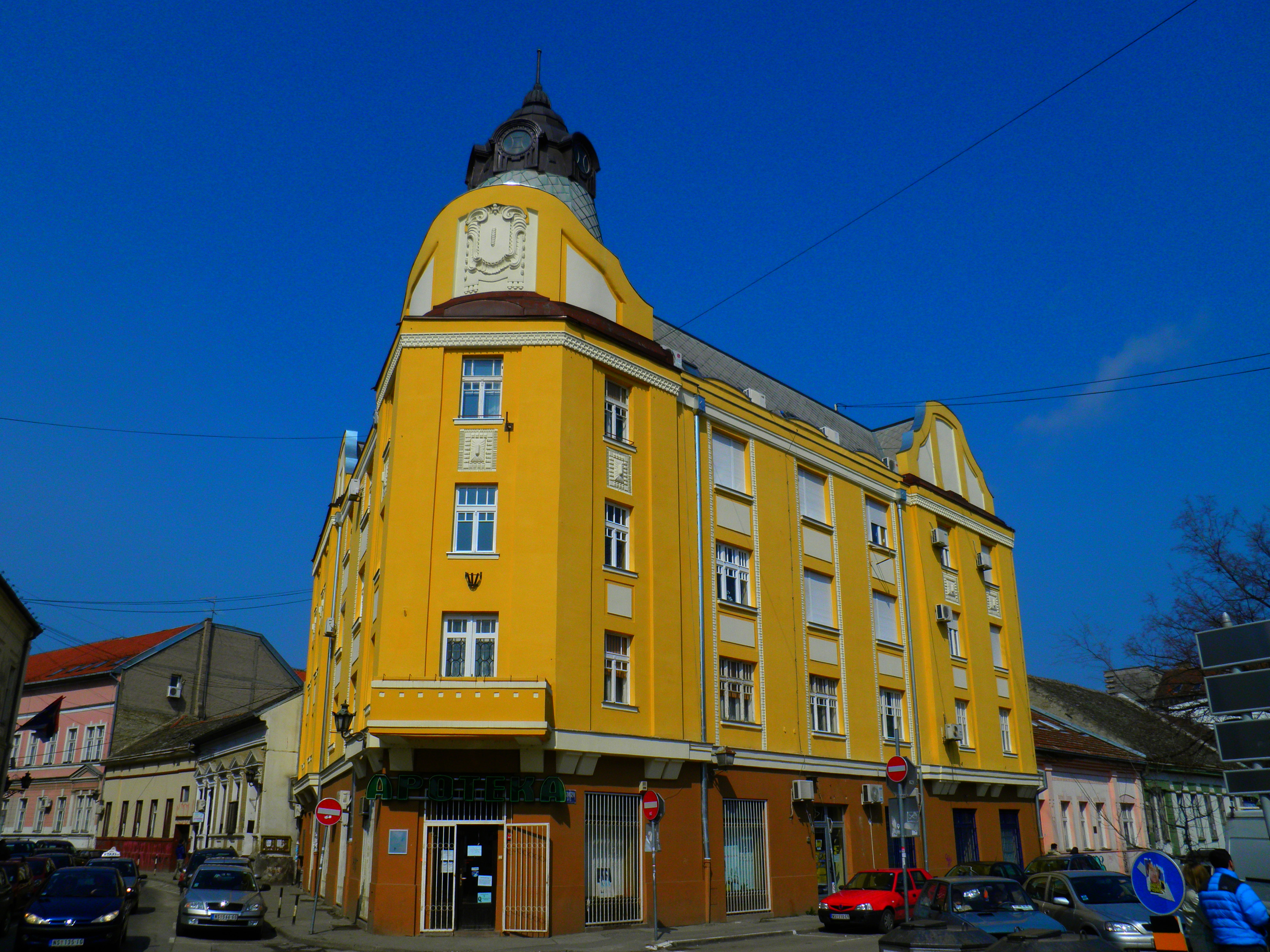
Building in Trifković Square, Novi Sad, 1923

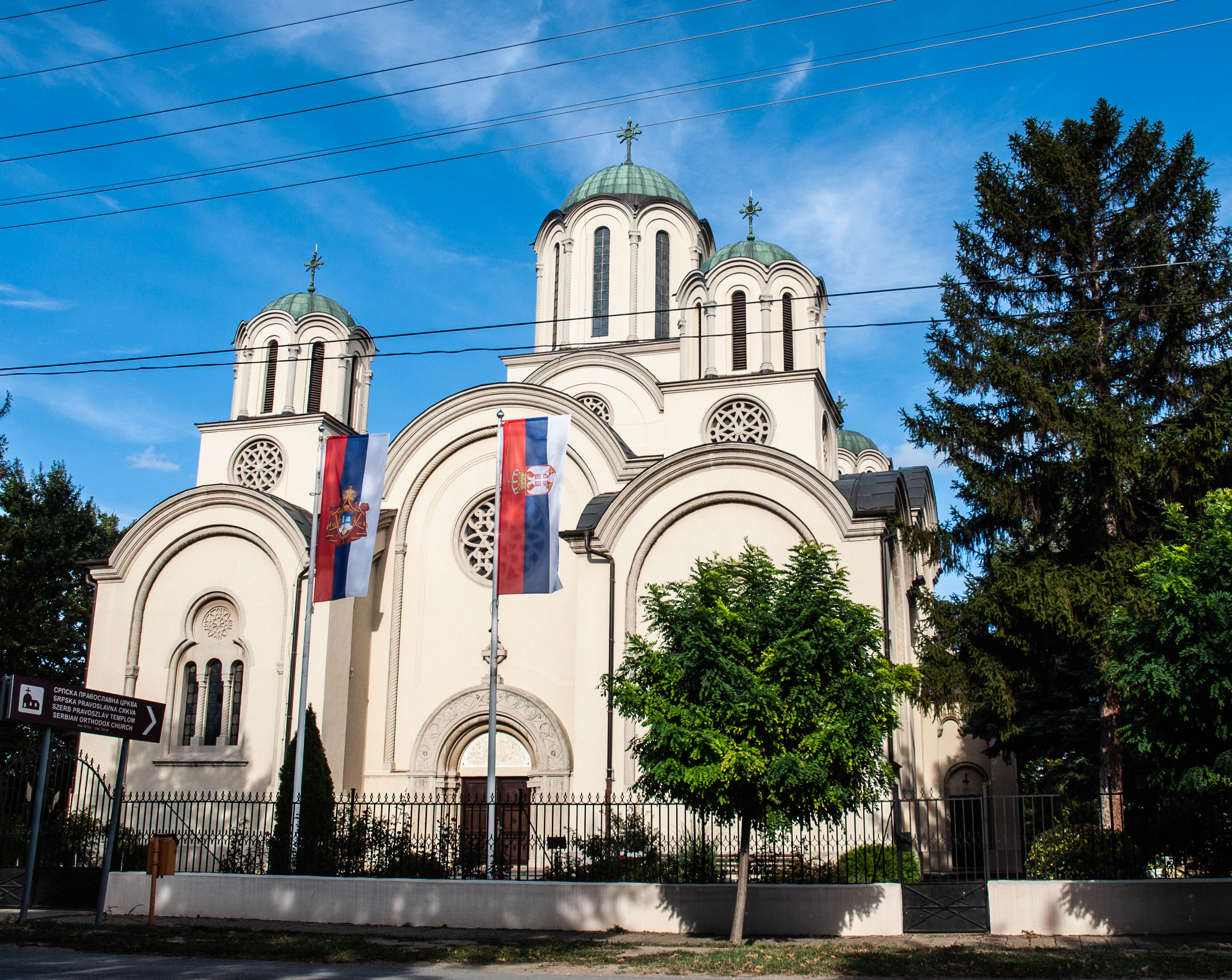
Serbian Orthodox church, Ada, 1926

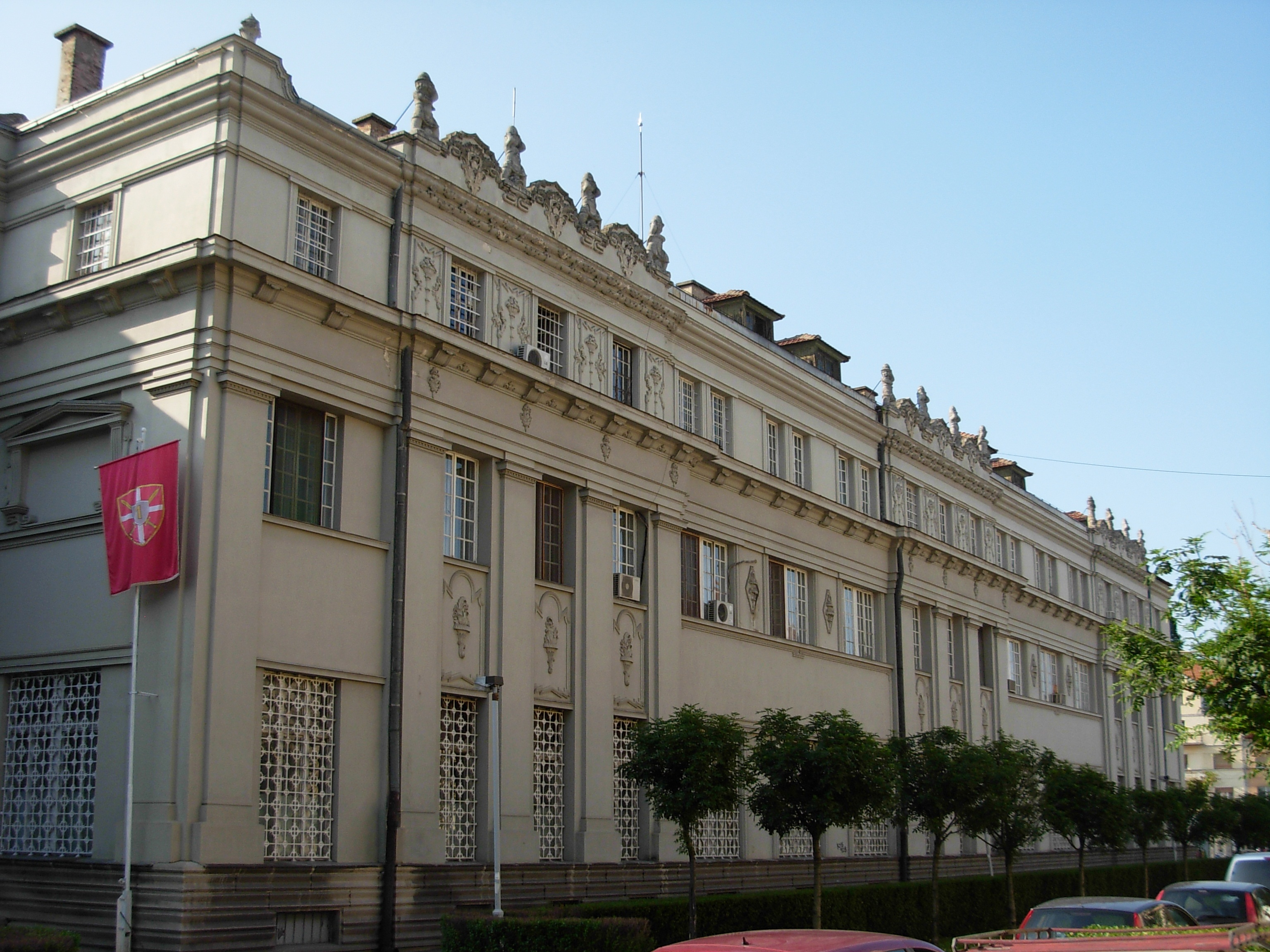
Command Headquarters of the First Army in Žarka Vasiljeva street, Novi Sad, 1930

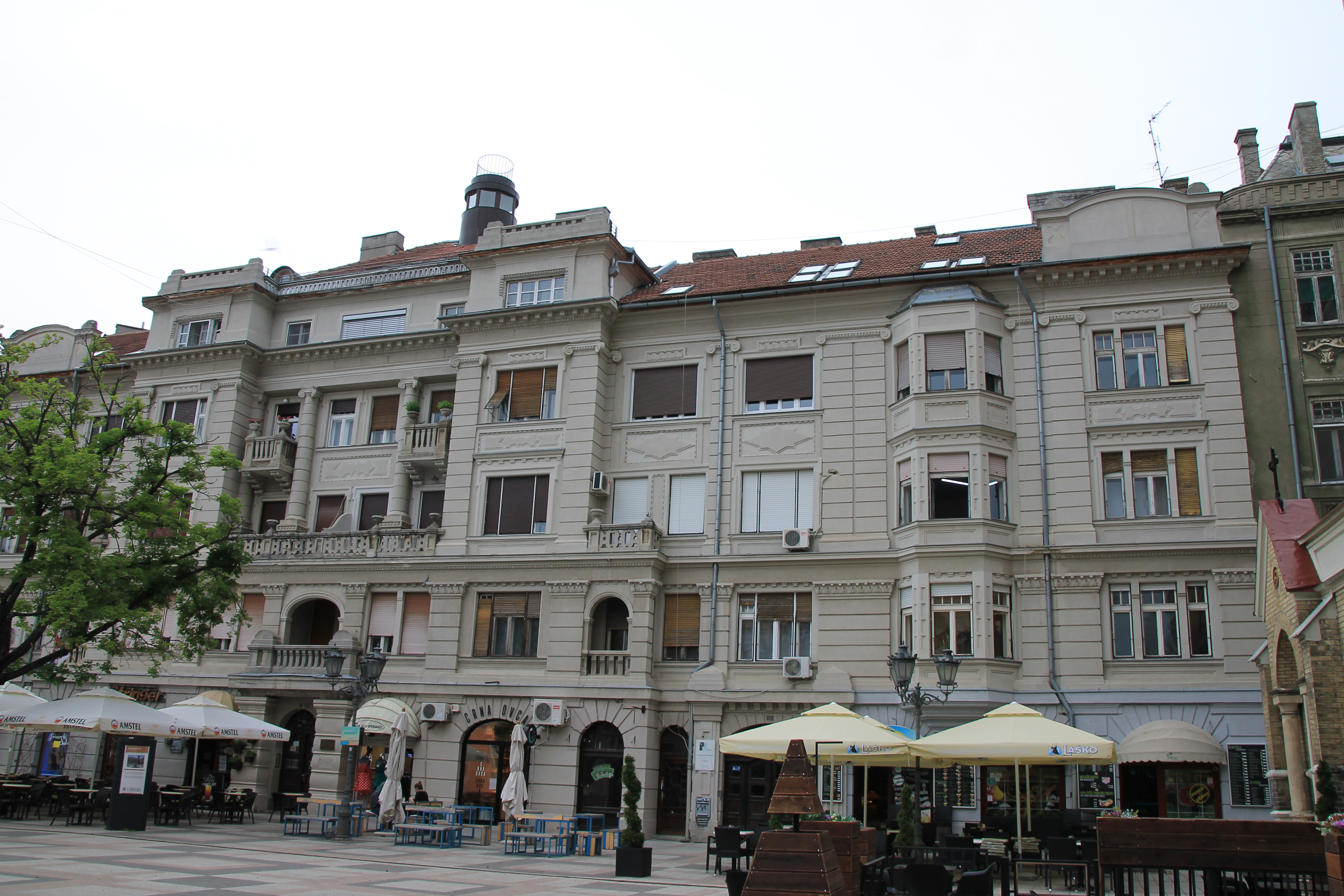
Vatikan Palace in Katolička porta, Novi Sad, 1930

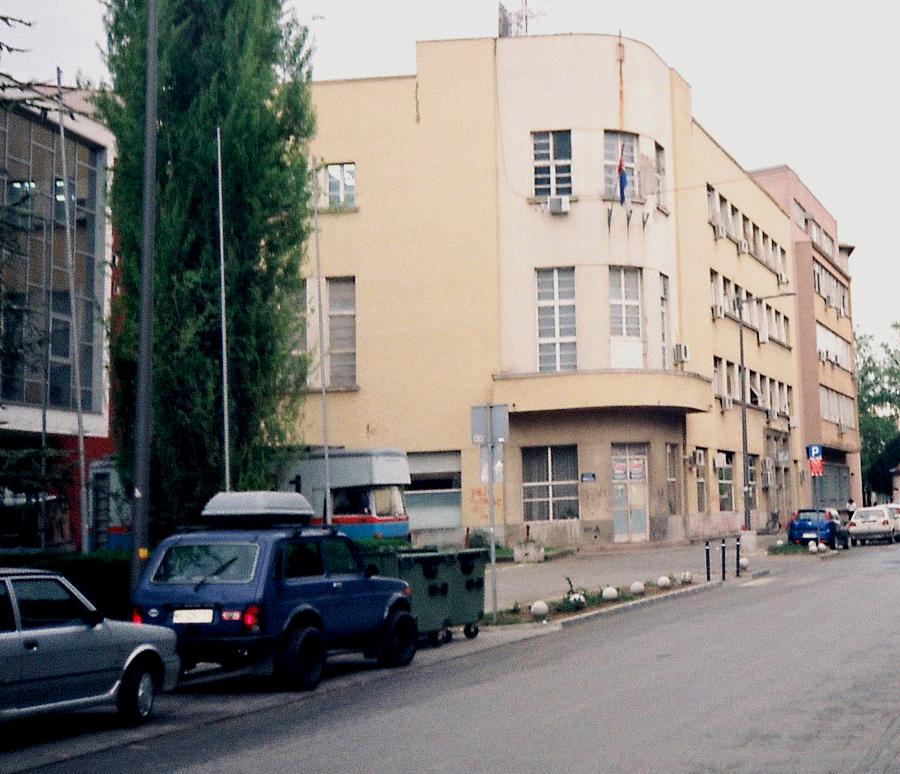
Radio Novi Sad, 1930

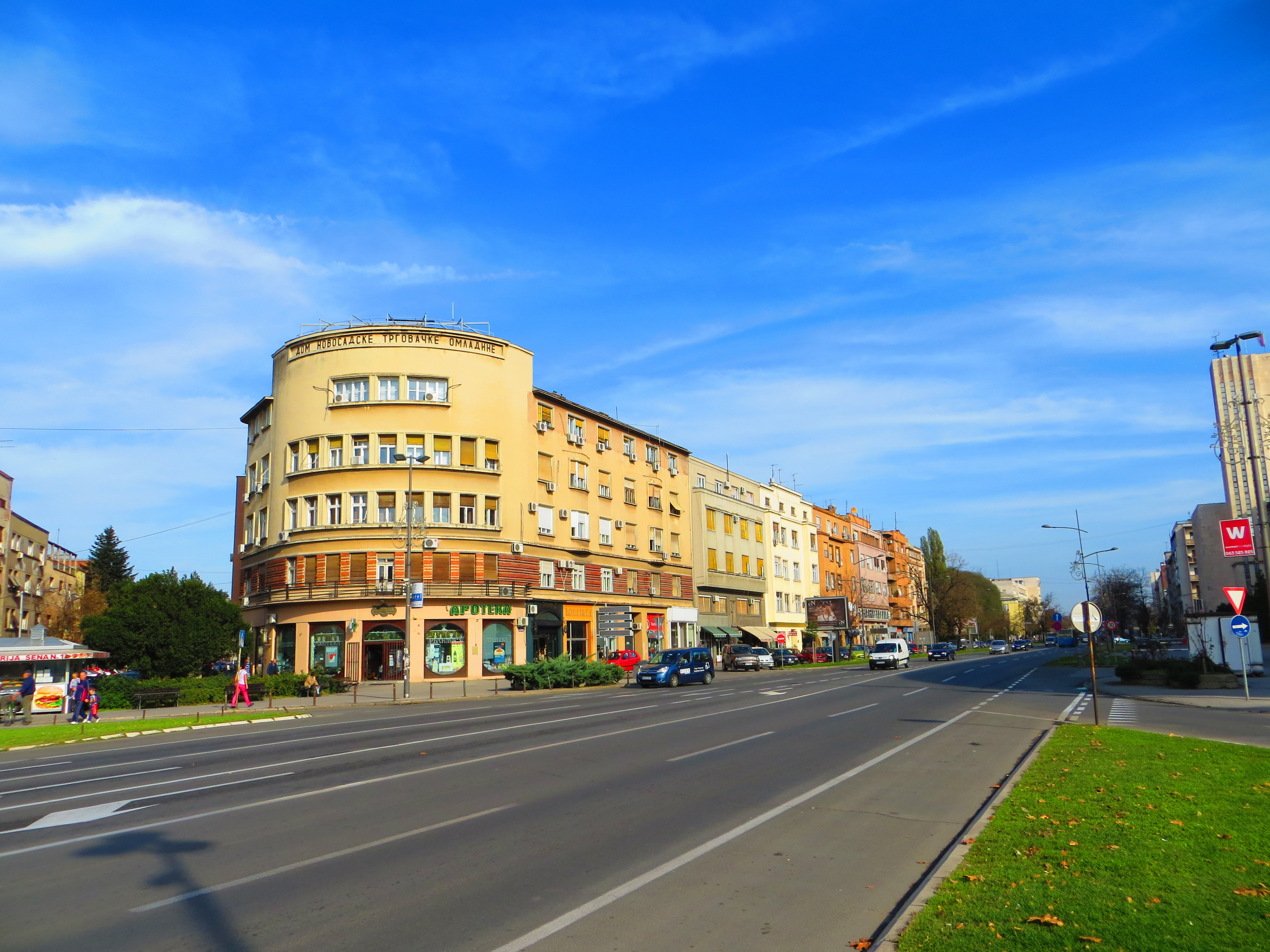
Apartment buildings in Mihajlo Pupin Boulevard, Novi Sad. 1931

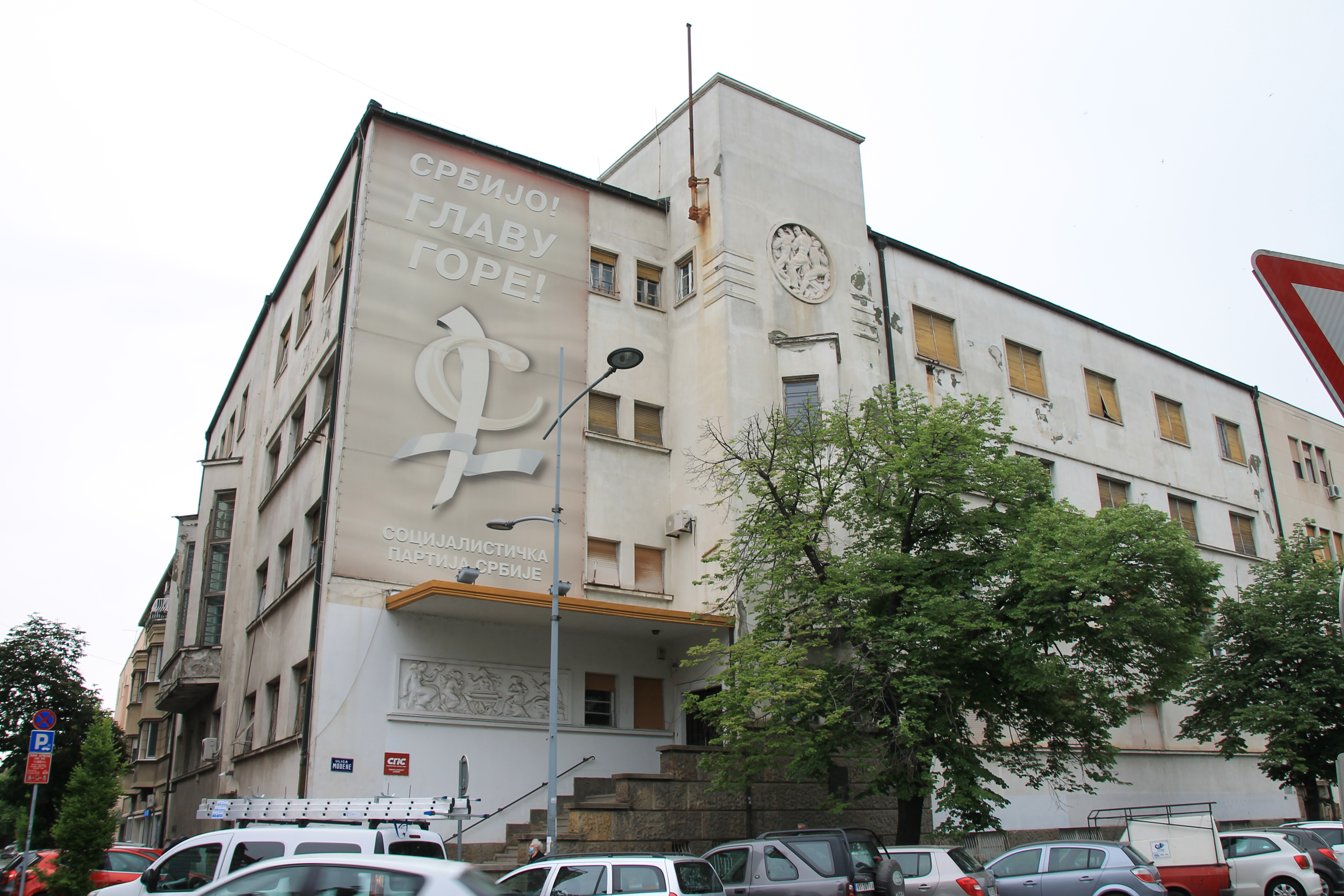
Chamber of Commerce and Crafts in Modena street, Novi Sad, 1931

=== Political career ===
Popović begun his political career in 1927 when he joined People's Radical Party, in the same year he was elected to a Local Assembly of Bačka Oblast. On 27 July 1928, he became Minister of Land Reform and served as the minister until the ministry was disestablished on 9 January 1929. He became the first Ban (governor) of Danube Banovina on 3 October 1929 but he resigned already on 16 January 1930 because of his disagreements with the central government. On 3 January 1932, he was appointed to be a Senator in Senate of Kingdom of Yugoslavia. He served two terms as a senator, his second term ended on 12 November 1932.

=== Journalist career ===
On 28 May 1936, Daka Popović co-founded daily newspaper called Dan, which became the most popular newspaper in Vojvodina. He resigned as one of the owners of the newspapers in 1938, but he continued to write about political and historical questions in Dan until it was abolished when the German occupation in World War II begun.
