= Radomir Saičić =

Serbian chemist and politician (born 1961)

- Радомир Саичић
- Saičić in October 2026

Member of the National Assembly
- Incumbent
- Assumed office 17 November 2026

Personal details
- Born: 31 October 1961 (age 65) Belgrade, PR Serbia, FPR Yugoslavia
- Party: Independent
- Other political affiliations: Student List (2026–present)
- Education: University of Belgrade (BSc, MSc, PhD)
- Profession: Chemist; university professor

Radomir Saičić (Serbian: Радомир Саичић; born 31 October 1961) is a Serbian chemist, university professor and politician who has been a member of the National Assembly since November 2026. A professor of organic chemistry at the University of Belgrade Faculty of Chemistry, he has been a full member of the Serbian Academy of Sciences and Arts (SANU) since 2018. A supporter of the student-led anti-corruption protests, he was one of the founders of the citizens' group through which the Student List contested the 2026 Serbian parliamentary election, in which he was elected on its list. On election night, he announced the Student List's victory from its headquarters.

== Early life and education ==
Saičić was born on 31 October 1961 in Belgrade. His father, Nikola Saičić, was an architect and university professor, and his parents are Montenegrin Serbs. He attended the Mathematical Grammar School in Belgrade.

He studied chemistry at the Faculty of Natural Sciences and Mathematics of the University of Belgrade (now the Faculty of Chemistry), graduating in 1983, and obtained his master's degree there in 1987. He defended his doctoral dissertation on free-radical chemistry, under the supervision of Živorad Čeković, in 1991. (Note: SANU gives 1992 as the year of his doctorate.) From 1995 to 1996, he completed postdoctoral studies at the Institute for the Chemistry of Natural Products of the French National Centre for Scientific Research in Gif-sur-Yvette. He served in the Yugoslav Wars.

== Academic career ==
After graduating, Saičić became a trainee teaching assistant at the Faculty of Natural Sciences and Mathematics, and was appointed teaching assistant in 1989. He was an associate professor at the Faculty of Chemistry from 1997 to 2002, when he became a full professor. He headed the Department of Organic Chemistry from 1999 to 2003 and again from 2023, and chairs the faculty's ethics commission. His research focuses on organic synthesis and medicinal chemistry, particularly the total synthesis of natural products such as paclitaxel (taxol) and its derivatives, which are used in chemotherapy.

In 2020, he became principal investigator of a project funded by the Science Fund of the Republic of Serbia under its special COVID-19 programme, on the repurposing of iminosugars and chloroquine analogues as therapies against RNA viruses. The project involved the Faculty of Chemistry, the Institute of Chemistry, Technology and Metallurgy and the Innovation Centre of the Faculty of Chemistry, in collaboration with the Pasteur Institute in Paris.

Saičić was elected a corresponding member of SANU, in its Department of Chemical and Biological Sciences, on 1 November 2012, and a full member on 8 November 2018. He has been a member of the Serbian Chemical Society since 1984.

== Political career ==
=== Anti-corruption protests ===
Saičić supported the student-led anti-corruption protests that followed the Novi Sad railway station canopy collapse in November 2024, and was targeted by pro-government media for doing so. In June 2025, he was one of 25 SANU members who signed a petition calling for the resignation of Aleksandar Vučić over the "collapse of the democratic, institutional and social foundations of our country". In May 2026, he walked out of the opening of an exhibition of the Serbian Orthodox Church in the SANU Gallery when Minister of Culture Nikola Selaković was announced as a speaker, saying that Selaković had caused "immeasurable damage to Serbian culture". Speaking at a protest at Slavija Square later that month, he accused the government of beating "children who seek justice" while protecting criminals.

=== 2026 parliamentary election ===
Saičić was one of 14 founders of the citizens' group "Student List – Students Are Winning", through which the Student List ran in the 2026 snap parliamentary election. Confirming his candidacy on 10 September 2026, he described the government as "criminalised and corrupt" and said he was prepared to put "even his life" at the disposal of the students and the country. He spoke at the rally in Novi Sad that opened the Student List's campaign the same day, where the first candidates were presented, saying that Serbia was "occupied today too, not by a foreign invader, but from within". When the list was published on 14 September, he was placed 91st.

On election night, after Vučić conceded defeat, Saičić, described by Bloomberg as one of the Student List's leaders, addressed supporters from the Student List's headquarters and announced its victory. He said: "Dear Serbia, tonight the voice of the people is being heard. Tonight we celebrate victory, tomorrow we build the future." Calling the result "not anyone's trophy, but a victory of the citizens", he urged supporters to celebrate "without hatred", adding that "tomorrow the work begins".

In October 2026, Danas and The Economist mentioned him among possible candidates in the upcoming presidential election.

=== National Assembly ===
The Student List won 140 of the 250 seats. Saičić entered the National Assembly when the mandates of all 250 members were confirmed at the constitutive session of the 15th convocation on 17 November 2026.

== Political positions ==
In an interview with RTS during the campaign, Saičić said that he considered Kosovo a "temporarily occupied territory", that the Student List's starting point was the Constitution of Serbia, and that Serbia should secure a good life for the Serbs there through negotiations with relevant international actors. He supported "productive relations" with Russia, citing Serbia's energy needs and historical ties, and described the future of Republika Srpska as "part of the future of the Serbian people". He said that the Student List offered the rule of law and equality before the law, regardless of citizens' religious or political views. Asked about his differences with sociologist and fellow candidate Jovo Bakić, he said that their shared political goals mattered more than personal differences, and that they agreed on environmental protection.

== Personal life ==
Saičić is religious and an Orthodox Christian. He has been married twice.

== Awards and honours ==
- October Prize of the City of Belgrade for students, for his master's thesis (1987)
- Medal of the Serbian Chemical Society (1995)
- Award of the City of Belgrade for the best scientific achievement in 2006 (awarded in 2007)
