= 15th National Assembly of Serbia =

Convocation of the National Assembly of Serbia from 2026

Fifteenth convocation of the National Assembly of the Republic of Serbia
←	14th National Assembly
- Seats won by each electoral list in the 2026 parliamentary election

Overview
- Meeting place: House of the National Assembly, 13 Nikola Pašić Square, Belgrade
- Term: 17 November 2026 –
- Election: 25 October 2026
- Government: Cabinet of Đuro Macut (caretaker)
- Website: parlament.gov.rs
- Members: 250
- President: Aleksandar Čupić (Ind./SL)
- Vice-presidents: Jelena Petrović (Ind./SL); Lidija Dimitrijević (Ind./SL); Marija Bjelobrk (Ind./SL); Sara Valentik (Ind./SL); Tibor Lazar (Ind./SL); Adem Mavrić (Ind./SL)
- Party control: Student List majority

The fifteenth convocation of the National Assembly of the Republic of Serbia (Serbian: Петнаести сазив Народне скупштине Републике Србије, romanised: Petnaesti saziv Narodne skupštine Republike Srbije) is the current convocation of the National Assembly of Serbia, elected in the snap parliamentary election of 25 October 2026. It was constituted on 17 November 2026 in the House of the National Assembly.

In the election, the Student List won an absolute majority of 140 seats, while the Serbian Progressive Party (SNS)-led "Aleksandar Vučić – United Serbia" list, which had led the outgoing majority, won 103 seats. Five national minority lists won the remaining seven seats. On the third day of the constitutive session, 19 November 2026, the Assembly elected Aleksandar Čupić of the Student List as president of the National Assembly, with 140 votes to 97 for Stojan Radenović, the candidate of the "Aleksandar Vučić – Serbia Is Winning" parliamentary group. As president of the Assembly, Čupić also became acting president of Serbia. Later that day, after most deputies of the "Aleksandar Vučić – Serbia Is Winning" group had walked out, the Assembly elected six vice-presidents, all from the Student List, and appointed Mirjana Radaković as secretary-general.

== Background ==
On 9 September 2026, Aleksandar Vučić, then the president of Serbia, dissolved the fourteenth convocation on a proposal from the government and called a snap parliamentary election for 25 October. Vučić resigned as president on 27 September to head the SNS-led list, and Ana Brnabić, the president of the National Assembly, became acting president of Serbia; the presidential election has to be held by 27 December 2026.

Voting was repeated at 53 polling stations on 1 November. The Republic Electoral Commission announced the final results on 5 November, with a turnout of 68.89%, and allocated the mandates to the elected candidates on 6 November. Of the 18 lists that took part, seven won seats.

Results of the 2026 parliamentary election
Electoral list	Votes	%	Seats
Student List – Students Are Winning	2,354,417	53.69	140
Aleksandar Vučić – United Serbia	1,731,323	39.48	103
Alliance of Vojvodina Hungarians	35,461	0.81	2
Albanian Coalition	27,683	0.63	2
Rasim Ljajić – Humane	20,638	0.47	1
SDA of Sandžak – Guardians of Sandžak	12,596	0.29	1
Usame Zukorlić – Movement for Unification	12,440	0.28	1
Other lists	190,507	4.34	0
Total	4,385,065	100	250

== Constitutive session ==
Under the Constitution, the first session of a newly elected National Assembly is convened by the president of the outgoing Assembly and must be held within 30 days of the announcement of the final election results. On 8 November, Brnabić convened the constitutive session for 17 November. Its agenda had six items: the confirmation of the members' mandates, the election of the president and the vice-presidents of the National Assembly, the appointment of the secretary-general, and the election of the members of the Assembly's working bodies and of its permanent delegations to international institutions.

Until a new president was elected, the session was chaired by the oldest member, mathematician Stojan Radenović, who was elected on the SNS list and had also chaired the constitutive session of the fourteenth convocation in 2024. He was assisted by the youngest members from each of the four lists that won the most seats and by the secretary-general of the National Assembly.

On 8 November, Dejan Šoškić, a former governor of the National Bank of Serbia elected on the Student List, said that the students had agreed on a candidate for president of the National Assembly, whose name would be announced by the student movement, and that the elected members of the Student List would decide independently as holders of their mandates. Brnabić said that representatives of the Student List had not contacted her or the Assembly's services to prepare the session; she said it had been customary to offer the opposition vice-presidential posts and the chairmanship of some committees, including those on foreign affairs and European integration, and invited them to get in touch.

The session opened on 17 November 2026. After the mandates were confirmed, the members took the oath of office and formed two parliamentary groups. Two candidates were proposed for president of the National Assembly: Radenović, whose nomination was presented by Vučić, and Aleksandar Čupić, an assistant professor at the University of Belgrade Faculty of Transport and Traffic Engineering elected on the Student List, whose nomination was presented by Jugoslav Gašić. The sitting was adjourned on the evening of 17 November without a president being elected and resumed the following day. On 18 November, Bálint Pásztor said that the two deputies of the Alliance of Vojvodina Hungarians would vote for Čupić.

=== Election of the president ===
On 19 November, after three days of debate, Radenović handed the chair to Nada Macura, the next-oldest deputy, because he was one of the candidates. In a public roll-call vote in which 239 deputies took part, Čupić received 140 votes and Radenović 97; two deputies abstained. Most deputies of the "Aleksandar Vučić – Serbia Is Winning" group left the chamber after voting, before the result was announced. Čupić then took the chair, describing the role of president of the Assembly as "first among equals". As the Constitution provides that the president of the National Assembly stands in for the president of the Republic when the presidential term ends early, he also became acting president of Serbia until a new president is elected.

Candidate	Proposed by	Votes	%
Aleksandar Čupić	Student List	140	59.07
Stojan Radenović	Aleksandar Vučić – Serbia Is Winning	97	40.93
Total		237	100.00
Registered voters/turnout		250	239

=== Election of the vice-presidents ===
Later on 19 November, the Assembly decided that the fifteenth convocation would have six vice-presidents and that they would be elected by public roll-call vote. The Student List group proposed six of its own deputies, while the "Aleksandar Vučić – Serbia Is Winning" group proposed Miloš Vučević, Vladimir Đukanović, Marina Raguš, Arno Gujon, Lidija Vukićević and Marija Stanković. During the debate, which lasted about eight hours, Vučić called on the Student List to give at least one vice-presidency to a representative of the national minorities and questioned the need for six vice-presidents, while Bakić said that the Student List had won decisively among Bosniaks, Hungarians and Slovaks and therefore had the legitimacy to represent them. Čupić issued eight reprimands during the debate: seven to deputies of the "Aleksandar Vučić – Serbia Is Winning" group, including Vučić, Brnabić and Jovanov, and one to Bakić.

Shortly after the vote began, most deputies of the "Aleksandar Vučić – Serbia Is Winning" group left the chamber, saying they would not take part in what they called a farce; before leaving, Brnabić told the majority that it had "killed 35-year-old democracy in this National Assembly". Some deputies of minority lists also left the chamber. All six Student List candidates were elected; of the minority deputies who stayed, Ahmedin Škrijelj voted for all six and Usame Zukorlić for Adem Mavrić only. (Note: Vote counts are as reported by RTS via Radio Kosovska Mitrovica. Direktno.rs reported 136 votes for each of the six elected candidates, including Mavrić.)

Election of the vice-presidents (19 November 2026)
Proposed by	Candidate	Votes	Result
Student List	Jelena Petrović	136	Elected
Student List	Lidija Dimitrijević	136	Elected
Student List	Marija Bjelobrk	136	Elected
Student List	Sara Valentik	136	Elected
Student List	Tibor Lazar	136	Elected
Student List	Adem Mavrić	137	Elected
Aleksandar Vučić – Serbia Is Winning	Miloš Vučević	6	Not elected
Aleksandar Vučić – Serbia Is Winning	Vladimir Đukanović	6	Not elected
Aleksandar Vučić – Serbia Is Winning	Marina Raguš	6	Not elected
Aleksandar Vučić – Serbia Is Winning	Arno Gujon	6	Not elected
Aleksandar Vučić – Serbia Is Winning	Lidija Vukićević	6	Not elected
Aleksandar Vučić – Serbia Is Winning	Marija Stanković	6	Not elected

=== Appointment of the secretary-general ===
Shortly before midnight, the Assembly appointed Mirjana Radaković, proposed by Čupić, as secretary-general of the National Assembly, succeeding Srđan Smiljanić. She received the votes of all 138 deputies present, with none against or abstaining. A graduate of the University of Belgrade Faculty of Law, Radaković had worked in the services of the Federal Assembly of Yugoslavia from 1987 to 2001 and of the National Assembly from 2002, as an assistant secretary-general from 2004 to 2016, and as an adviser at the Constitutional Court from 2017 until mid-2025, when she became eligible for retirement.

The third day of the sitting ended at around midnight, after about 14 hours. Čupić adjourned the session until 24 November 2026, when the Assembly is to elect the members of its working bodies and of its permanent delegations to international institutions.

== Parliamentary groups ==
Two parliamentary groups were formed at the constitutive session on 17 November 2026: the Student List group, led by Jovo Bakić with Aleksandra Štimac as deputy leader, and the "Aleksandar Vučić – Serbia Is Winning" group of the deputies elected on the Aleksandar Vučić – United Serbia list, led by Aleksandar Vučić with Milenko Jovanov as deputy leader. The seven deputies elected on national minority lists and Marko Korać, elected on the "Aleksandar Vučić – United Serbia" list, did not join a group.

Parliamentary groups (18 November 2026)
Parliamentary group	MPs	Leader	Deputy leader
Student List	140	Jovo Bakić	Aleksandra Štimac
Aleksandar Vučić – Serbia Is Winning	102	Aleksandar Vučić	Milenko Jovanov
MPs not members of parliamentary groups	8	—N/a	—N/a
Total	250		

== Government formation ==
The National Assembly is dissolved if it fails to elect a government within 90 days of being constituted. Until a new government is elected, the cabinet of Đuro Macut, elected by the fourteenth convocation, remains in office. As acting president of Serbia, Čupić is responsible for proposing a candidate for prime minister to the Assembly and for calling the presidential election, which must be held by 27 December 2026.

Šoškić said on 5 November that he would consider the post of prime minister if it were "the proposal of the students and the result of a democratic process", and that he expected a new government to be formed within a month. On 8 November, he said that the Assembly's committees and the government would be formed after the constitutive session, and that the process should be completed with the presidential election by the end of the year.

== Members ==
On 6 November 2026, the Republic Electoral Commission allocated 140 mandates to candidates from the Student List, 103 to candidates from the "Aleksandar Vučić – United Serbia" list, two each to the Alliance of Vojvodina Hungarians and the Albanian Coalition, and one each to the "Rasim Ljajić – Humane", "SDA of Sandžak – Guardians of Sandžak" and "Usame Zukorlić – Movement for Unification" lists. The mandates of all 250 members were confirmed at the constitutive session on 17 November 2026. The tables below list the members by parliamentary group. The "Nominated by" column gives the electoral list or party on whose proposal each member was elected, as recorded by the National Assembly; the "Party" column gives party membership only where it is reported by the party or the media.

=== Student List ===
Name	Nominated by	Party	Year of birth	Notes
Jelka Aksentijević	SL	—	1977	
Miroslav Andrić	SL	—	1971	
Aleksandar Arsić	SL	—	1979	
Jovo Bakić	SL	—	1970	Parliamentary leader
Aleksander Baucal	SL	—	1965	
Sanja Belić	SL	—	1983	
Andrea Besedeš Nađ	SL	—	1966	
Marija Bjelobrk	SL	—	1976	Vice-president of the National Assembly
Dejan Bodiroga	SL	—	1973	
Dragan Bogojević	SL	—	1985	
Milan Bogunović	SL	—	1982	
Slobodan Bubnjević	SL	—	1978	
Anđelka Bulatović	SL	—	1976	
Igor Cegledi	SL	—	1981	
Ivan Ćirić	SL	—	1980	
Maja Crnogorac Đurić	SL	—	1982	
Aleksandar Čupić	SL	—	1978	President of the National Assembly
Đoka Ćurčić	SL	—	1978	
Aleksandar Cvetković	SL	—	1977	
Dragan Cvetković	SL	—	1977	
Marijana Cvetković Marković	SL	—	1971	
Jovana Devetaković	SL	—	1986	
Bojan Dimitrijević	SL	—	1973	
Lidija Dimitrijević	SL	—	1966	Vice-president of the National Assembly
Feđa Dimović	SL	—	1977	
Zoran Đajić	SL	—	1955	
Dragana Đorđević	SL	—	1963	
Tanja Đorđević Hamidović	SL	—	1975	
Milena Đorđijević	SL	—	1980	
Dejan Đurđev	SL	—	1973	
Dušan Đurđević	SL	—	1960	
Dražen Drašković	SL	—	1985	
Marija Džunić	SL	—	1977	
Sarah El Sarag	SL	—	1978	
Slavica Filipović	SL	—	1974	
Sanja Fric	SL	—	1983	
Stanko Fuštar	SL	—	1985	
Jugoslav Gašić	SL	—	1977	
Tatjana Grujić	SL	—	1972	
Željko Hubač	SL	—	1967	
Aleksandra Ilić	SL	—	1981	
Dejan Ivanišević	SL	—	1990	
Dejan Jakšić	SL	—	1974	
Jovana Jemović	SL	—	1992	
Miloš Jevtić	SL	—	1978	
Dragan Jovanović	SL	—	1965	
Milica Jovanović	SL	—	1989	
Vladan Jovanović	SL	—	1966	
Rastko Jović	SL	—	1978	
Zlatko Kokanović	SL	—	1976	
Imre Krizmanić	SL	—	1962	
Maja Krstić	SL	—	1970	
Mitar Krstić	SL	—	1979	
Mladen Krstić	SL	—	1976	
Nemanja Krstić	SL	—	1984	
Tibor Lazar	SL	—	1980	Vice-president of the National Assembly
Marija Lesjak	SL	—	1984	
Irena Ljubomirović	SL	—	1974	
Vladan Mančić	SL	—	1981	
Milina Marić	SL	—	1965	
Marija Maruna	SL	—	1968	
Milan Matić	SL	—	1977	
Adem Mavrić	SL	—	1997	Vice-president of the National Assembly
Janko Međedović	SL	—	1981	
Ivan Mijailović	SL	—	1969	
Nikola Mikić	SL	—	1990	
Uroš Mikić	SL	—	1996	
Igor Mikitišin	SL	—	1991	
Dragan Milićev	SL	—	1968	
Aleksandar Milojković	SL	—	1966	
Ivan Milosavljević	SL	—	1974	
Stanislav Milošević	SL	—	1989	
Marija Milovanović	SL	—	1973	
Živojin Milovanović	SL	—	1990	
Petar Mitov	SL	—	1997	
Marija Mitrović	SL	—	1978	
Stefan Mladenović	SL	—	1987	
Predrag Mrđa	SL	—	1986	
Aleksandar Nešković	SL	—	1959	
Marko Nikolić	SL	—	1979	
Mirjana Nikolić	SL	—	1966	
Ljubica Oparnica	SL	—	1971	
Tatjana Paunović	SL	—	1964	
Tatjana Pejčić	SL	—	1961	
Goran Perišić	SL	—	1976	
Aleksandra Perkov	SL	—	1975	
Ivana Petrović	SL	—	1969	
Jelena Petrović	SL	—	1974	Vice-president of the National Assembly
Milena Petrović	SL	—	1974	
Marina Petrović Julich	SL	—	1968	
Tatjana Petrović-Ropret	SL	—	1967	
Milana Pisarić	SL	—	1984	
Aleksandra Popin	SL	—	1972	
Daliborka Purić	SL	—	1975	
Uroš Radovančev	SL	—	1983	
Biljana Radovanović Brkanović	SL	—	1964	
Vera Radović	SL	—	1972	
Sanela Ramadanović	SL	—	1977	
Mirza Ramusović	SL	—	1991	
Mario Reljanović	SL	—	1977	
Jugoslav Ristić	SL	—	1957	
Suzana Rogan	SL	—	1971	
Radomir Saičić	SL	—	1961	
Sanja Savčić	SL	—	1976	
Ana Savić	SL	—	1978	
Slobodan Savić	SL	—	1957	
Vladimir Savić	SL	—	1970	
Katarina Šćepanović	SL	—	1977	
Vesna Seničić	SL	—	1964	
Mikica Sibinović	SL	—	1979	
Dejan Šoškić	SL	—	1967	
Vesna Spasojević Brkić	SL	—	1971	
Ilija Srdanović	SL	—	1970	
Vesna Srećković	SL	—	1957	
Svetlana Stanarević	SL	—	1968	
Tihomir Stanić	SL	—	1960	
Katarina Stanković	SL	—	1974	
Gordana Stefanović	SL	—	1959	
Zoran Stevanović	SL	—	1956	
Aleksandra Štimac	SL	—	1988	Deputy parliamentary leader
Sreten Stojanović	SL	—	1964	
Zorica Stojanović	SL	—	1982	
Dragan Stojić	SL	—	1977	
Zoran Stojiljković	SL	—	1953	
Dragan Stojković	SL	—	1983	
Danijela Stošić Panić	SL	—	1981	
Miloš Todorović	SL	—	1962	
Saša Tomas	SL	—	1988	
Oliver Tošković	SL	—	1977	
Ana Trifunović	SL	—	1977	
Slavoljub Uzunović	SL	—	1971	
Sara Valentik	SL	—	2000	Vice-president of the National Assembly
Milica Vasiljević Blagojević	SL	—	1979	
Aleksandar Vasov	SL	—	1968	
Tomislav Veljković	SL	—	1961	
Jovan Vujičić	SL	—	1983	
Slobodan Vukosavić	SL	—	1962	
Marija Vulović	SL	—	1978	
Milan Zdravković	SL	—	1970	
Tatjana Žunić	SL	—	1971	
Source: National Assembly of Serbia

=== Aleksandar Vučić – Serbia Is Winning ===
All members of this group were elected on the "Aleksandar Vučić – United Serbia" list on the proposal of the SNS. (Note: The Republic Electoral Commission does not publish candidates' party affiliations, and the National Assembly records all deputies elected on the "Aleksandar Vučić – United Serbia" list as elected on the proposal of the SNS. Party membership is given only where reported by the party or the media; for the remaining deputies it is left blank, as the list also included non-party candidates and candidates of other parties. Stojan Radenović, Jovan Kolundžija and Branislav Lečić were described as non-party figures when they were first elected on the SNS list in 2022.)

Name	Nominated by	Party	Year of birth	Notes
Nenad Abramović	SNS	—	1968	
Jelena Antić Periz	SNS	—	1993	
Nebojša Bakarec	SNS	SNS	1963	
Vladimir Balać	SNS	—	2002	
Nikola Bokan	SNS	SNS	1999	
Saša Borojević	SNS	—	1973	
Ana Brnabić	SNS	SNS	1975	
Dejan Bulatović	SNS	Independent (Note: Bulatović left the Party of Freedom and Justice in December 2022 and in January 2023 founded the Alliance of Social Democrats, an association of citizens.)	1975	
Aleksandar Divović	SNS	—	1986	
Pavle Đorđević	SNS	—	1991	
Đorđo Đorđić	SNS	RP	1978	
Vladimir Đukanović	SNS	SNS	1979	
Jelena Đukić Milinković	SNS	—	1980	
Nevena Đurić Nikitović	SNS	SNS	1993	
Milovan Drecun	SNS	SNS	1957	
Sanja Džajić	SNS	—	1989	
Jovana Erdeljan	SNS	—	1984	
Filip Filipović	SNS	—	1998	
Ivana Filipović	SNS	—	1989	
Aleksa Grubešić	SNS	—	1994	
Ivan Grujin	SNS	—	1977	
Arno Gujon	SNS	SNS	1985	
Sonja Ilić	SNS	—	1981	
Lepomir Ivković	SNS	SNS	1959	
Stanislava Janošević	SNS	SNS	1986	
Branislav Josifović	SNS	—	1991	
Milenko Jovanov	SNS	SNS	1980	Deputy parliamentary leader
Nataša Jovanović	SNS	SNS	1966	
Verica Jovanović	SNS	—	1966	
Jovan Kolundžija	SNS	Independent	1948	
Aleksa Kondić	SNS	—	1994	
Miroslav Kondić	SNS	SNS	1980	
Risto Kostov	SNS	PUPS	1954	
Stefan Krkobabić	SNS	PUPS	1989	
Nina Kuburović	SNS	—	1994	
Darko Laketić	SNS	SNS	1975	
Luka Lalošević	SNS	—	2001	
Branislav Lečić	SNS	Independent	1955	
Ivana Macak	SNS	—	2000	
Nada Macura	SNS	—	1948	
Dušan Marić	SNS	SNS	1963	
Lazar Marić	SNS	—	1995	
Dejan Marinković	SNS	SRS	1992	
Mirka Marinković	SNS	—	1966	
Aleksandar Marković	SNS	SNS	1981	
Dragan M. Marković	SNS	PUPS	1965	
Rajka Matović	SNS	SNS	1989	
Adrijana Mesarović	SNS	SNS	1981	
Milija Miletić	SNS	USS (Note: In the 14th convocation, the National Assembly listed Miletić as a member of the SNS in the parliamentary group he shared with Healthy Serbia.)	1968	
Svetlana Miletić-Drakulić	SNS	—	1965	
Aleksandar Mirković	SNS	SNS	1988	
Marko Mladenović	SNS	SNS	1990	
Zdravko Mladenović	SNS	SNS	1977	
Predrag Momčilović	SNS	—	1977	
Uglješa Mrdić	SNS	SNS	1978	
Marina Nedeljković	SNS	SRS	1989	
Danijela Nikolić	SNS	—	1978	
Goran Nikolić	SNS	—	1976	
Jasmina Obradović	SNS	SNS	1961	
Vladimir Pantelić	SNS	—	1980	
Biljana Pantić Pilja	SNS	SNS	1983	
Jelena Pavlović	SNS	—	1985	
Milica Pavlović	SNS	—	1983	
Miloš Pavlović	SNS	—	2003	
Miroslav Petrašinović	SNS	SNS	1985	
Olja Petrović	SNS	—	1990	
Svetlana Popadić	SNS	SNS	1974	
Stojan Radenović	SNS	Independent	1948	
Vjerica Radeta	SNS	SRS	1955	
Milan Radin	SNS	SNS	1988	
Uroš Radulović	SNS	—	1988	
Marina Raguš	SNS	SNS	1969	
Goran Rakić	SNS	SNS	1971	
Anja Ranković	SNS	—	2001	
Željko Rebrača	SNS	SNS	1972	
Marijan Rističević	SNS	NSS	1958	
Slavica Santrač	SNS	—	1959	
Nikola Selaković	SNS	SNS	1983	
Aleksandar Šešelj	SNS	SRS	1993	
Dejan Stalović	SNS	—	1973	
Pavle Stamatović	SNS	—	1995	
Marija Stanković	SNS	—	2001	
Goran Stanojević	SNS	—	1964	
Miloš Stevanić	SNS	—	1989	
Milan Stojičić	SNS	—	1965	
Miloš Stojković	SNS	—	1986	
Borka Šutović	SNS	—	1967	
Samir Tandir	SNS	BOSS	1984	
Nataša Tasić Knežević	SNS	—	1977	
Snežana Tomić Gajić	SNS	—	1991	
Kristina Vasiljković	SNS	—	1989	
Marija Vesović	SNS	—	1989	
Miloš Vučević	SNS	SNS	1974	
Aleksandar Vučić	SNS	SNS	1970	Parliamentary leader
Vukašin Vučićević	SNS	—	2002	
Dina Vučinić	SNS	SNS	1987	
Milimir Vujadinović	SNS	—	1979	
Nikola Vukelić	SNS	—	1981	
Lidija Vukićević	SNS	SNS	1962	
Marija Zdravković	SNS	SNS	1973	
Ljiljana Živković	SNS	—	1977	
Dragana Živković-Obradović	SNS	—	1964	
Source: National Assembly of Serbia

=== Members without a parliamentary group ===
Name	Nominated by	Party	Year of birth
Borisz Bájity	VMSZ/SVM	VMSZ/SVM	1982
Shaip Kamberi	Albanian Coalition	PDD	1964
Marko Korać	SNS	— (Note: Korać was elected on the "Aleksandar Vučić – United Serbia" list on the proposal of the SNS and is not a member of any parliamentary group.)	1994
Visar Mehmeti	Albanian Coalition	APN	1983
Dženan Palamar	Ljudski	SDP	1980
Bálint Pásztor	VMSZ/SVM	VMSZ/SVM	1979
Ahmedin Škrijelj	SDAS	SDAS	1982
Usame Zukorlić	SPP	SPP	1992
Source: National Assembly of Serbia
