= Politics of Serbia =

- Greater coat of arms of Serbia
- Polity type: Unitary parliamentary constitutional republic
- Constitution: Constitution of Serbia
- Formation: 5 June 2006

Legislative branch
- Name: National Assembly
- Type: Unicameral
- Presiding officer: Ana Brnabić (Note: Brnabić presides over the outgoing 14th National Assembly; the 15th National Assembly, elected in October 2026, is due to elect its president at its constitutive session on 17 November 2026.), President of the National Assembly

Executive branch
- Head of state
- Title: President of the Republic
- Currently: Ana Brnabić (acting)
- Appointer: Direct popular vote
- Head of government
- Title: Prime Minister
- Currently: Đuro Macut
- Appointer: President of the Republic (nominator); National Assembly (appointer)
- Cabinet
- Current cabinet: Cabinet of Đuro Macut
- Leader: Prime Minister
- Appointer: National Assembly

Judicial branch
- Name: Judiciary
- Supreme Court
- Chief judge: Miroljub Tomić (acting)

The politics of Serbia are defined by a unitary parliamentary framework that is defined by the Constitution of Serbia in which the President of the Republic is the head of state while the Prime Minister is the head of government. Executive power is exercised by the Government (consisting of the cabinet that includes Prime Minister and ministers) and the President of the Republic. Legislative power is vested in the unicameral National Assembly which is composed of 250 proportionally elected deputies. The judiciary is independent from the executive and the legislature and is headed by the Supreme Court, the highest court in the country.

The Economist Intelligence Unit rated Serbia a "flawed democracy" in its 2024 Democracy Index, ranking it 64th in the world with a score of 6.26. The Bertelsmann Stiftung's Transformation Index (BTI) 2026 classified Serbia as a "moderate autocracy", reporting a significant decline in electoral conditions, the rule of law and media freedom, while the V-Dem Institute has classified it as an electoral autocracy since 2014, ranking it 112th of 179 countries on its Liberal Democracy Index in 2026. Freedom House rates Serbia "partly free", with a score of 53 out of 100 in 2026, down from 56 a year earlier, stating that the Serbian Progressive Party (SNS) had steadily eroded political rights and civil liberties and put legal and extralegal pressure on independent media, the political opposition and civil society organisations. A 2026 IRI poll found the main political issues in Serbia included corruption, political polarization and cost of living.

== Legal framework ==
Following Montenegro's secession and the subsequent dissolution of Serbia and Montenegro in 2006, Serbia restored its independence and adopted a new constitution, which replaced the constitution adopted in 1990. The proposed text of the constitution was adopted by the National Assembly on 30 September 2006 and put to a vote in a referendum which was held on 28–29 October 2006. After 53% of the electorate voted in favor of the proposed constitution, it was officially adopted on 8 November 2006. A constitutional referendum was held again on 16 January 2022, in which voters decided on amending the constitution in the provisions related to the expanding independence of the judiciary. The "yes" option prevailed over the "no" option in the referendum, although turnout was reported to be the lowest since 1990, at only 30% of voters in total. Constitutional changes were adopted by the National Assembly on 9 February.

The legal system of Serbia is a civil law system, historically influenced by Germanic and, to a lesser degree, French law, as well as Yugoslav law, but in the process of the accession of Serbia to the European Union, the legal system is being completely harmonized with European Union law.

== Executive ==
The President of the Republic (Serbian: Председник Републике, romanized: Predsednik Republike) is the head of state. The president is directly elected and serves a five-year term and is limited by the Constitution to a maximum of two terms. The president is the commander-in-chief of the armed forces, has the procedural duty of appointing the Prime Minister with the consent of the National Assembly through a majority vote of all deputies, and has certain influence on defense and foreign policy. The most recent presidential election, held on 3 April 2022, was won by Aleksandar Vučić. Although the presidency is constitutionally a largely ceremonial position, Vučić was widely seen as exercising de facto executive power, giving the system features of a semi-presidential system. Vučić resigned on 27 September 2026 to head the SNS-led list in the snap parliamentary election, and Brnabić, as president of the National Assembly, became acting president; the presidential election has to be held by 27 December 2026.

Executive power is mainly exercised by the Prime Minister (Serbian: Председник Владе, romanized: Predsednik Vlade), who heads a cabinet (Serbian: Владa, romanized: Vlada). The prime minister is chosen by the National Assembly on the proposal of the president of the Republic, who names the designate after consultations with leaders of all parliamentary parties. The prime minister is responsible for presenting his/her agenda to the National Assembly as well as proposing the ministers to fill the cabinet posts in his/her government. The government is considered elected if it has been elected by a majority vote of all deputies in the National Assembly.

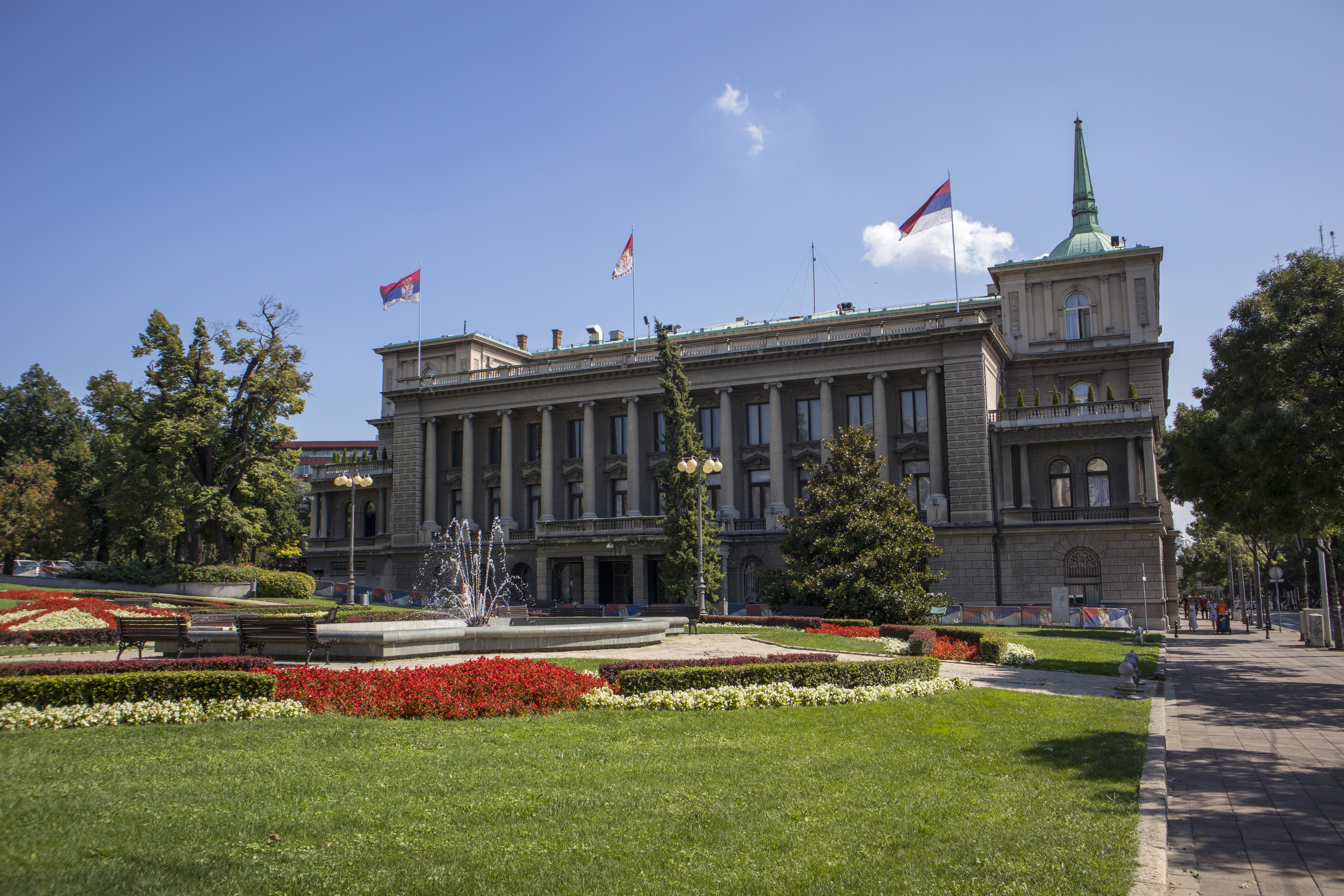
Novi Dvor, seat of the President

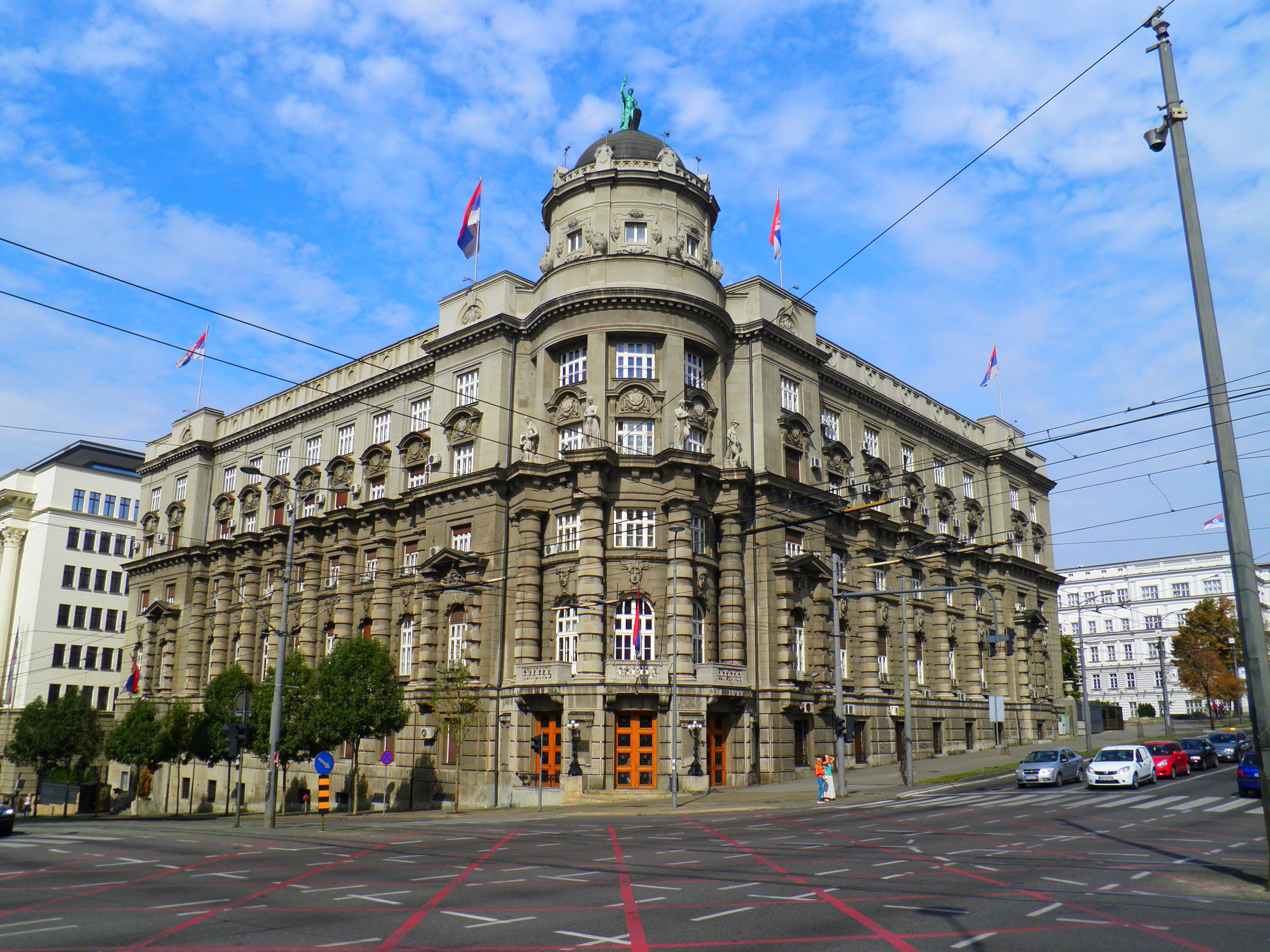
Government Building, seat of Prime Minister

Main office-holders
Office	Name	Party	Since
President	Ana Brnabić (acting)	Serbian Progressive Party	27 September 2026
Prime Minister	Đuro Macut	Independent	16 April 2025

== Legislature ==
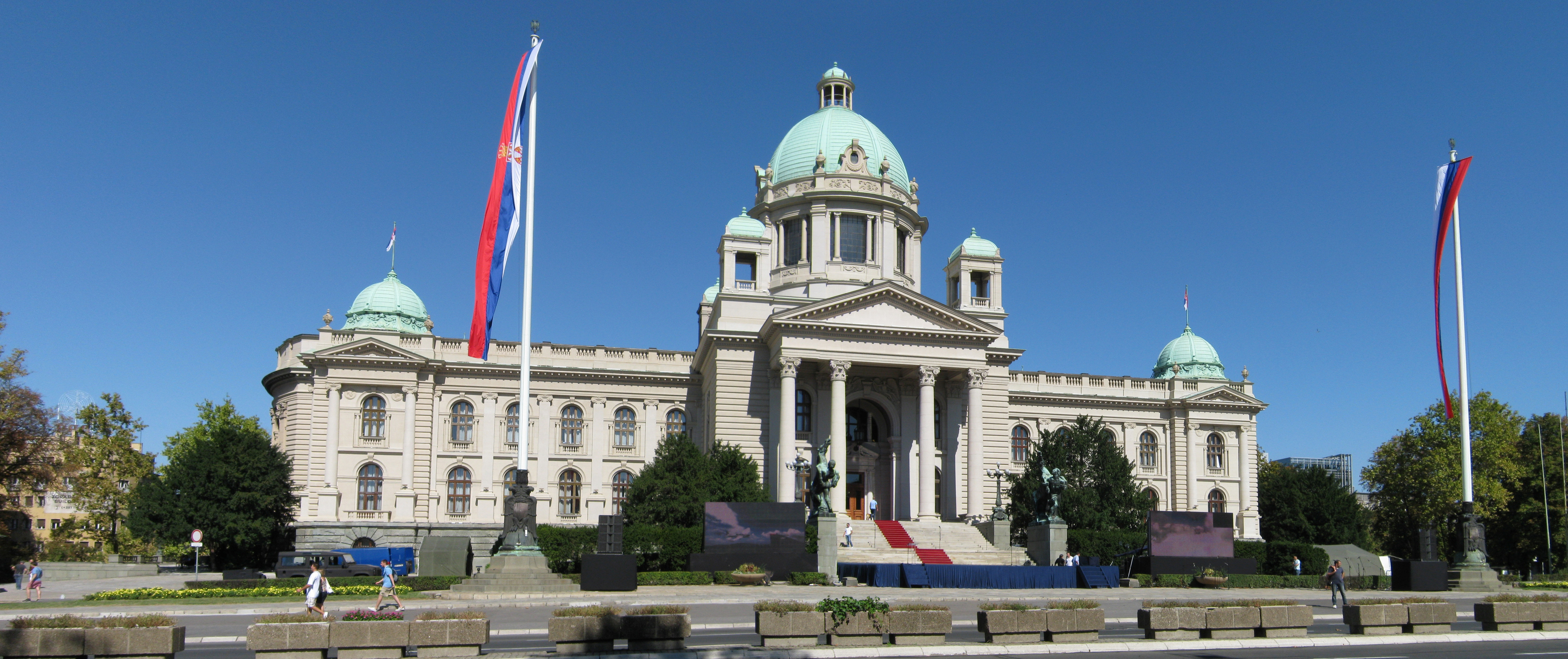
House of the National Assembly

Legislative power is vested in the unicameral parliament known as the National Assembly (Serbian: Народна скупштина, romanized: Narodna skupština), which is composed of 250 proportionally elected deputies by secret ballot. The powers of the legislature include enactment and amendment of the constitution, enactment of laws, adoption of the state budget, declarations of war and peace, calling and conducting referendums and elections, appointments and relief of office of independent public authorities, supervising the work of the Government and holders of independent public authorities. Decisions are made based on a majority vote if more than half of the deputies are present, except in cases of constitutional issues. The 15th National Assembly, elected in October 2026, is due to hold its constitutive session on 17 November 2026.

== Judiciary ==
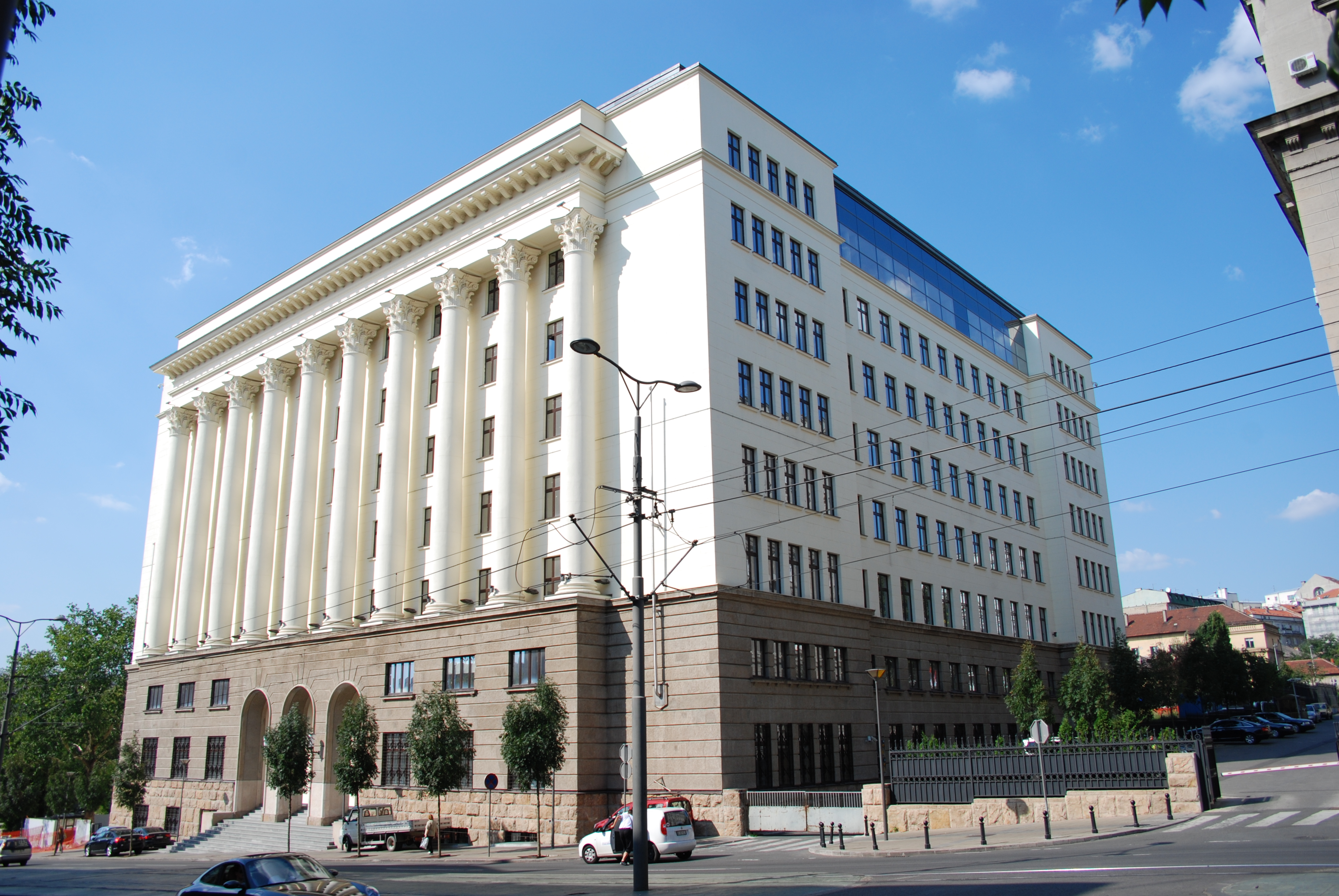
Building of the Supreme Court

The judiciary of Serbia is a three-tiered system of courts with the Supreme Court (Serbian: Врховни суд, romanized: Vrhovni sud) standing at the highest tier. The Supreme Court is the highest court of appeal and court of cassation for both types of jurisdiction that exist (courts of general jurisdiction and courts of special jurisdiction). After the term of its president, Jasmina Vasović, expired in April 2026, the High Judicial Council appointed judge Miroljub Tomić as acting president of the court until a new president is elected.

The Ministry of Justice handles the administration of judiciary, including paying salaries and constructing new courthouses, as well as administering the prison system.

== Parties and elections ==
Serbia uses the multi-party system, with numerous political parties in which no one party often has a chance of gaining power alone, this results in the formation of coalition governments. Elections are held on the parliamentary, provincial and local level, and are scheduled every four years, while presidential elections are scheduled every five years.

The first political parties and organizations were established in the first half of the 19th century, but they were officially registered as political parties in 1881. The People's Radical Party (NRS) dominated Serbian and Yugoslav politics from the late 1880s until 1928. Serbia was a part of the Kingdom of Serbs, Croats and Slovenes (later known as the Kingdom of Yugoslavia) from 1918 until 1941. During the period of German occupation the government was independent and was mostly run by military personnel, right-wing politicians and former members of the fascist Yugoslav National Movement (ZBOR). After World War II, Serbia was re-established as a one-party state and as one of the constituent republics of the communist Yugoslavia, which was headed by the League of Communists of Serbia (SKS). (Note: Serbian branch of the League of Communists of Yugoslavia) After the dissolution of communist Yugoslavia in 1992, Serbia became a constituent part of Serbia and Montenegro and until 2000, it was under the dominant rule of the Socialist Party of Serbia (SPS). In the first decade of the 21st century, political landscape was dominated by the coalitions of center-left and center-right parties, the largest among them being Democratic Party (DS) and Democratic Party of Serbia (DSS). From 2012 to 2026, the populist and neoliberal Serbian Progressive Party (SNS) was the dominant party in Serbian politics, leading every government. In the 2026 snap parliamentary election, held amid the student-led anti-corruption protests, the Student List won an absolute majority of 140 of the 250 seats, while the SNS-led list won 103.

=== 2026 parliamentary election ===
Diagram of the National Assembly
Electoral list	Votes	%	Seats	+/–
Student List	2,354,417	53.69	140	New
Aleksandar Vučić – United Serbia	1,731,323	39.48	103	–26
Ivica Dačić – Factor of Stability!	94,766	2.16	0	–18
Authentic Right	39,503	0.90	0	–13
Alliance of Vojvodina Hungarians	35,461	0.81	2	–4
Albanian Coalition	27,683	0.63	2	+1
Humane (SDP–CDP)	20,638	0.47	1	New
Strength of Serbia Movement	20,045	0.46	0	0
SDA Sandžaka	12,596	0.29	1	–1
European Serbia	12,570	0.29	0	–20
Movement for Unification	12,440	0.28	1	–1
Russian Party	6,503	0.15	0	–1
Russian–Serbian Unity Party	4,286	0.10	0	New
Alternative for Serbia	3,705	0.08	0	0
Mother Serbia – Gruda	3,234	0.07	0	New
Liberal-Green Party	2,686	0.06	0	New
Pa, This is for You	2,022	0.05	0	New
Force Coalition	1,187	0.03	0	0
Total	4,385,065	100.00	250	0
Valid votes	4,385,065	98.73		
Invalid/blank votes	56,571	1.27		
Total votes	4,441,636	100.00		
Registered voters/turnout	6,451,292	68.85		
Source: Republic Electoral Commission

== International Organizations ==
Serbia is a member state of numerous international organizations: UN, ICC, IMF, WB, OSCE, CoE, BSEC, PfP, CEFTA, SECI, CEI.

Serbia applied to join the European Union (EU) in 2009 and has been a candidate for membership since 2012, along with nine other states. Serbia is the largest country in Southeast Europe seeking entry into the EU.

== Status of Kosovo ==
Kosovo unilaterally self-proclaimed independence from Serbia in 2008, a move which Serbia strongly rejects. Serbia does not recognize Kosovo as an independent state and continues to claim it as the Autonomous Province of Kosovo and Metohija. However, differences and disputes remain. Initially there were no relations between the two; but in the following years there has been increased dialogue and cooperation between the two sides.

Though Kosovo is not a member state of United Nations, it remains a partially recognized country, with 104 out of 193 UN member states recognizing its independence. According to the international law, and Resolution 1244, which ended the Kosovo War it is claimed by Serbia as the autonomous province.

Negotiations facilitated by the European Union resulted in the 2013 Brussels Agreement on the normalization of relations between the governments of Kosovo and Serbia. The agreement pledged both sides not to block the other in the EU accession process, defined the structure of the police and local elections in all parts of Kosovo, and also established the proposal of the Community of Serb Municipalities.

The United States-mediated diplomatic talks agreed on the interconnection of air, train and road traffic, while both parties signed the 2020 agreement on the normalization of economic relations.

Both parties agreed to a proposed normalization agreement in EU mediated dialogue in 2023 and through further negotiations accepted a roadmap and timescale for its implementation the following month.

== See also ==
- Far-right politics in Serbia
