= Željko Hubač =

Serbian dramatist, journalist and politician

- Жељко Хубач
- Hubač in October 2026

Member of the National Assembly
- Incumbent
- Assumed office 17 November 2026

Personal details
- Born: 19 July 1967 (age 59) Tuzla, SR Bosnia and Herzegovina, SFR Yugoslavia
- Party: Independent
- Other political affiliations: Student List (2026–present)
- Education: University of Niš
- Occupation: Playwright; dramaturg; theatre critic; journalist; screenwriter; politician

Željko Hubač (Serbian: Жељко Хубач; born 19 July 1967) is a Serbian playwright, dramaturge, theatre critic, journalist, screenwriter and politician. Elected third on the Student List in the 2026 Serbian parliamentary election, he has been a member of the National Assembly since 17 November 2026.

== Early life and education ==
He grew up in Zenica and Leskovac. He graduated from the Faculty of Electrical Engineering at the University of Niš, and subsequently studied dramaturgy at the Faculty of Dramatic Arts. According to Hubač, although his biological father was a Croat and his biological mother a Bosnian Muslim, he was adopted and raised by a Czech man and a Serb woman whom he considers his true parents. He considers himself a Serb.

== Career ==
During the Kosovo War, he was stationed as a soldier in Uroševac.

He was a member of the editorial board for the Contemporary Serbian Drama edition, editor-in-chief of Pozorišne novine (Theatre Newspaper) and the Premijera plus theatre review, and an editor for the Teatron theatre magazine editions at the Museum of Theatre Art of Serbia. His plays have been performed in professional theatres in Serbia, Bosnia and Herzegovina, Bulgaria and Croatia. He writes theatre reviews and publishes theatrological essays. He is a member of the International Association of Theatre Critics and Theatrologists, and has participated in several domestic and international projects in culture and the arts. He is the screenwriter and author of several television shows and two television drama series produced by networks in Serbia and Montenegro.

He worked as a correspondent for Radio Free Europe, a contributor to the Helsinki Charter magazine, and a columnist for Danas. He is a member of the Independent Journalists' Association of Serbia. He served as a dramaturg at the Serbian National Theatre in Novi Sad, and as a dramaturg and editor of publishing at the National Theatre in Belgrade.

== Political career ==
Hubač was active in the student-led anti-corruption protests. When the citizens' group Student List was formed for the 2026 parliamentary election, he was placed third on its electoral list. In interviews about his political engagement, Hubač said that his participation represented a synergy between the student movement and established professionals aiming to help "reset the state" and restore functioning democratic institutions.

The Student List won 140 of the 250 seats. Hubač entered the National Assembly when the mandates of all 250 members were confirmed at the constitutive session of the 15th convocation on 17 November 2026.
