= Aleksandar Čupić =

Acting president of Serbia since 2026

- Александар Чупић
- Čupić in 2026

President of Serbia
- Acting
- Assumed office 19 November 2026
- Prime Minister: Đuro Macut
- Preceded by: Ana Brnabić (acting)

President of the National Assembly of Serbia
- Incumbent
- Assumed office 19 November 2026
- Preceded by: Ana Brnabić

Personal details
- Born: 1978 (age 47–48) Prokuplje, SR Serbia, SFR Yugoslavia
- Party: Independent
- Other political affiliations: Student List (2026–present)
- Children: 6
- Education: University of Belgrade
- Occupation: Professor

Aleksandar Čupić (Serbian: Александар Чупић; born 1978) is a Serbian professor and politician who has been president of the National Assembly and, in that capacity, acting president of Serbia since 19 November 2026. A docent at the University of Belgrade Faculty of Transport and Traffic Engineering, where he has worked since 2004, he supported the student protests and was elected to the National Assembly on the Student List in the 2026 parliamentary election. Nominated by the Student List for president of the Assembly, he was elected with a 140–97 vote, defeating Stojan Radenović of the Serbian Progressive Party.

== Early life and education ==
Čupić was born in 1978 in Prokuplje. He finished the Toplički Heroji Gymnasium there with honours and a Vuk diploma, then studied postal, telegraph and telephone traffic at the Faculty of Transport and Traffic Engineering of the University of Belgrade, graduating in 2003 with an average grade of 9.05. He received a government scholarship for young scientific talent, earned a master's degree from the same faculty in 2007 and defended his doctoral dissertation there in 2014.

== Academic career ==
Čupić has worked at the Faculty of Transport and Traffic Engineering since 2004 and is a docent in the Department of Postal Traffic and Networks.

== Political career ==
=== Student protests and election ===
Čupić publicly supported the student protests from their start in late November 2024. During a student march to Kragujevac in early 2025, he and his wife hosted hundreds of students overnight in the greenhouses on their property, and he later spoke at the Student List's final pre-election rally on Slavija.

In March 2025, when the Democratic Party (DS) revived its Foundation for the Promotion of Democracy "Ljuba Davidović", established in 1991 and named after Ljubomir Davidović, Čupić became a member of the foundation's management board. After media reported in November 2026 that he would be the Student List's candidate for president of the National Assembly, SNS official Milenko Jovanov cited the board membership to call him "another Democratic Party cadre", according to the pro-government Večernje novosti.

He was 51st on the Student List in the 2026 parliamentary election and was elected when the list won 140 of the 250 seats.

=== President of the National Assembly ===
On 17 November 2026, at the constitutive sitting of the 15th National Assembly, the Student List group formally nominated Čupić for president of the National Assembly, with Jugoslav Gašić presenting the proposal. The "Aleksandar Vučić – Serbia Is Winning" group nominated Stojan Radenović, who was chairing the sitting as the oldest deputy. The Alliance of Vojvodina Hungarians and the Justice and Reconciliation Party announced their support for Čupić.

During the debate, SNS deputies Ana Brnabić and Aleksandar Vučić said the Student List had misled the public by presenting Čupić as a university professor rather than a docent, and asked him to apologise. Vučić added that this did not make him less competent for the office. SNS deputy Vladimir Đukanović said Čupić had left his work as a construction investor out of his biography. Vučić also showed a document that, he said, deputy Biljana Pantić Pilja had obtained from the cadastre. According to Vučić, it showed that Čupić held a half share in seven flats in one building in Voždovac, and he asked Čupić to explain them. At a press conference after the sitting on 18 November, Čupić said he would submit a report on his assets to the Agency for the Prevention of Corruption, as required by law, and would give those who had "speculated and slandered" that day the chance to apologise to him. He said the sitting had been marked by digressions, personal insults and slander, which had gone unaddressed under previous practice, and that this would end if he were elected president of the Assembly. He added that the former ruling SNS still did not seem to have come to terms with reality.

On 19 November, after the debate closed, Radenović handed the chair to Nada Macura, the next-oldest deputy, because he was one of the candidates. In the public roll-call vote, in which 239 deputies took part, Čupić was elected with 140 votes to Radenović's 97; two deputies, Čupić among them, abstained. He then took the chair, describing the role of president of the Assembly as "first among equals" and calling for the dignity of the parliament to be restored.

=== Acting President of Serbia ===
As president of the National Assembly, Čupić also became acting president of Serbia, an office vacant since Vučić resigned on 27 September 2026, and is to hold it until a new president is elected. The presidential election must be held by 27 December 2026.

== Personal life ==
Čupić is married and has six children. Since 2012 he has lived with his family in a village in the municipality of Sopot, where he runs an organic fruit and vegetable farm.

Political offices
Preceded by Ana Brnabić	President of the National Assembly of Serbia; 2026–present	Incumbent
Preceded by Ana Brnabić as acting president	President of Serbia (Acting); 2026–present	Incumbent
