= Rajka Matović =

Serbian politician

Rajka Matović (Serbian Cyrillic: Рајка Матовић; born 1989), formerly known as Rajka Velaga, is a politician in Serbia. She has served in the Assembly of the City of Belgrade since 2014 and has been a member of the National Assembly of Serbia since 2020. Matović a member of the Serbian Progressive Party.

== Private career ==
Matović lives in Belgrade. She has a bachelor's degree in biochemistry and began working as a youth office coordinator in the Belgrade municipality of Surčin in January 2013.

== Politician ==
=== Municipal politics ===
Matović received the seventy-fifth position on the Progressive Party's electoral list in the 2014 Belgrade City Assembly election. The list won sixty-three mandates, and she was not immediately returned. She received a mandate on 24 April 2014 as the replacement for another party member, after the Progressives formed a new coalition government in the city, and several elected members resigned to take executive positions.

She was promoted to the fifty-sixth position on the party's list in the 2018 city election and was re-elected when the list won sixty-four mandates.

=== Parliamentarian ===
Matović received the 250th position out of 250 on the Progressive Party's Aleksandar Vučić – Serbia Is Winning list in the 2016 Serbian parliamentary election. Winning election from this position was a statistical impossibility, and while the list won a majority with 131 out of 250 mandates she was indeed not returned. She indicated that she was honoured to represent the Progressive Party on the list, even in the final position.

She was given the 175th position on the successor Aleksandar Vučić — For Our Children list in the 2020 parliamentary election and was elected when the list won a landslide majority with 188 mandates. She is now a member of the health and family committee, a deputy member of the committee on the rights of the child and the committee on spatial planning, transport, infrastructure, and telecommunications, and a member of the parliamentary friendship groups with Bosnia and Herzegovina, China, Cyprus, Greece, Russia, Spain, and Turkey.
