= 2026 Serbian presidential election =

- 27 December 2026
Incumbent President
Aleksandar Čupić (acting)
Independent

Presidential elections will be held in Serbia on 27 December 2026 to elect the president of Serbia. The election is being held early because Aleksandar Vučić resigned on 27 September 2026, before the end of his second term, to lead the list of the Serbian Progressive Party (SNS) as its candidate for prime minister in the snap parliamentary election of 25 October. Vučić was ineligible to run again, having served two terms. Ana Brnabić and then Aleksandar Čupić, in their capacity as president of the National Assembly, have served as acting president since his resignation.

The Student List, which won the parliamentary election, has said that it has a presidential candidate, while Vučić said that the SNS would not take part in the election; the party's bodies are to make a final decision in December. Branimir Nestorović and Bogoljub Karić have announced their candidacies.

== Background ==
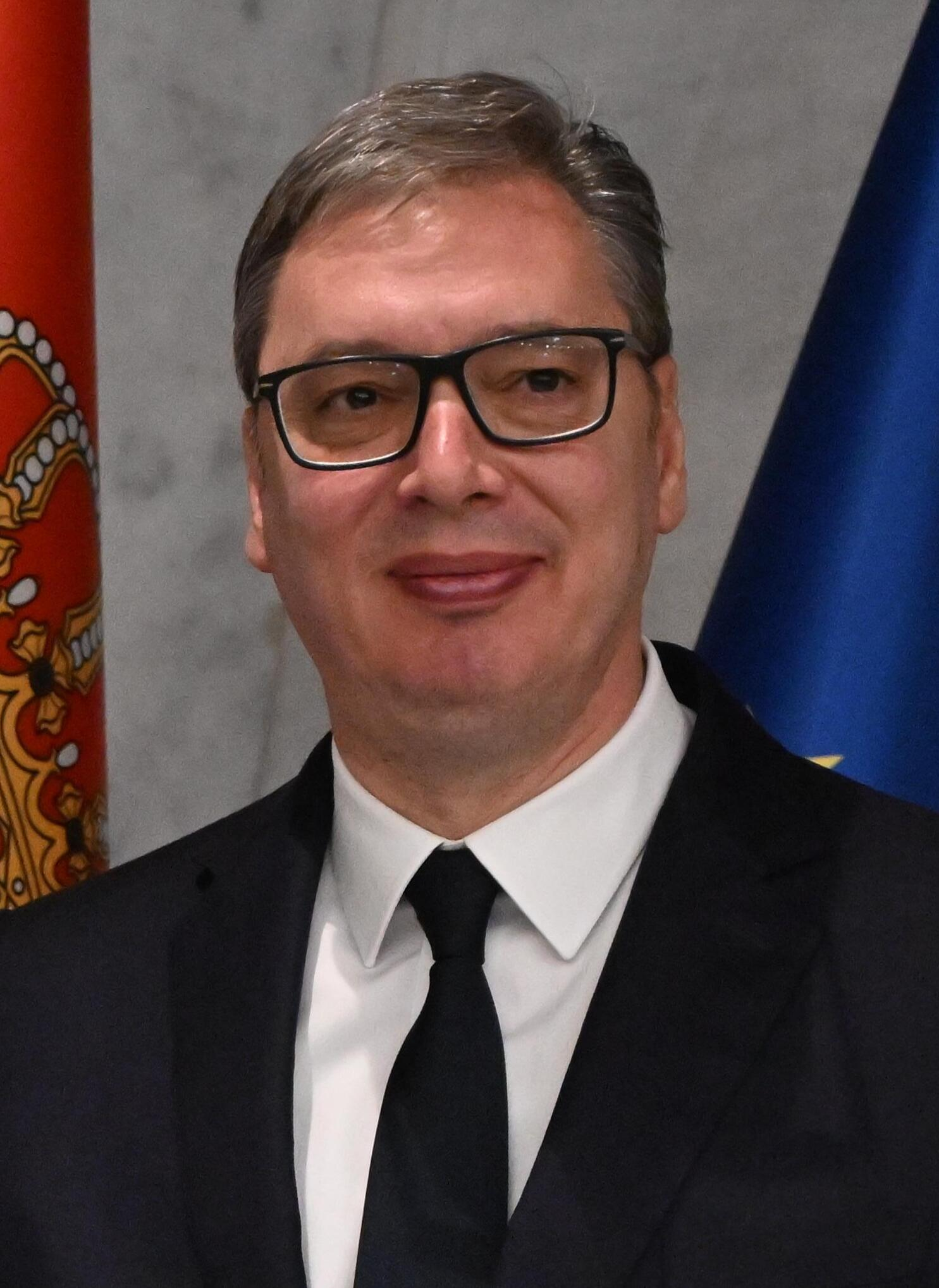
Aleksandar Vučić, president from 2017 to 2026, resigned in September 2026.

A coalition led by the Serbian Progressive Party (SNS) and including the Socialist Party of Serbia (SPS) came to power after the 2012 election. Aleksandar Vučić, who initially served as deputy prime minister of Serbia and later as prime minister of Serbia, was elected president of Serbia in 2017 and re-elected in 2022. During his time in power, observers assessed that Serbia suffered democratic backsliding into authoritarianism, accompanied by a decline in media freedom and civil liberties. The V-Dem Institute has categorised Serbia as an electoral autocracy since 2014, while Freedom House has said that the SNS steadily eroded political rights and civil liberties and put pressure on independent media, the opposition and civil society organisations, rating Serbia "partly free" with a score of 53 out of 100 in 2026.

=== Student-led protests ===
In the aftermath of the Novi Sad railway station canopy collapse in November 2024, ministers Goran Vesić and Tomislav Momirović announced their resignations. Their resignations were acknowledged by the National Assembly on 25 November. Student-led anti-corruption protests also began in November 2024; one of their demands was the public release of documents on the reconstruction of the railway station. An estimated 100,000 people attended the protest on Slavija on 22 December. On 24 January 2025, a day of civil disobedience promoted as a "general strike" took place, although trade unions said that it was not a general strike in the formal sense. After a group of students was physically attacked in Novi Sad, Prime Minister Miloš Vučević announced his resignation on 28 January. An estimated 325,000 people attended the protest in Belgrade on 15 March, the largest in Serbia's history. Vučević's resignation was acknowledged by the National Assembly on 19 March, and Đuro Macut succeeded him as prime minister on 16 April. Macut was the third independent politician to be nominated for prime minister of Serbia.

=== 2026 parliamentary election ===
In the snap parliamentary election held on 25 October 2026, the Student List won 140 of the 250 seats, while the SNS-led list "Aleksandar Vučić – United Serbia" won 103. At the constitutive sitting of the 15th National Assembly, the Student List's candidate Aleksandar Čupić was elected president of the National Assembly on 19 November, defeating Stojan Radenović of the SNS by 140 votes to 97.

== Electoral system ==
The president of Serbia is elected for a five-year term by direct election and secret ballot. Candidates may be nominated by a registered political party, a coalition of political parties, or a citizens' group (grupa građana), and nominations must be submitted to the Republic Electoral Commission (RIK) no later than 20 days before election day. Along with the nomination, the nominator must submit the candidate's written consent, a scanned ID card, at least 10,000 valid signatures of voters, the list of signatories, and a confirmation from the nominating party, coalition or citizens' group. A nomination can be withdrawn, and a proclaimed candidate can also withdraw from the election. The ballot contains the name and date of the election, the ordinal numbers and names of the candidates, the names of the nominators, and notes telling voters that voting is secret and that they may vote for only one candidate. Every adult citizen of Serbia who has not been deprived of legal capacity has the right to vote.

The RIK, local election commissions and polling boards administer the election. Local election commissions must send all ballots to the RIK within 96 hours of the close of polls, after which the RIK has 96 hours to publish the results. The election is called by the president of the National Assembly at least 90 days before the outgoing president's term expires, and must be held on a weekend. If the president's term ends early, through death or resignation, the election must be held within three months; during a state of war or emergency, it is held within three months of the end of that state. Between 30 and 60 days must pass between the calling of the election and election day.

A candidate is elected if they receive a majority of the votes cast. Otherwise, a second round is held within 15 days of the proclamation of the first-round results between the two candidates who received the most votes; if two or more candidates are tied for first or second place, they all appear on the second-round ballot. The candidate who receives the most votes in the second round is elected. If one of the candidates loses the right to be elected before the second round, the entire election is repeated. If parliamentary and presidential elections are held on the same day (general elections), voting takes place at the same polling stations and is overseen by the same commissions and boards.

=== Election date ===
Vučić's second term was due to end on 31 May 2027, so a regular election would have had to be held by 1 May 2027, although it could be called earlier. In April 2024, Vučić said that the next parliamentary elections would be held together with the presidential election in 2027, but from October 2025 he suggested that they could be held in late 2026, saying that he would not run again. In March 2026, he suggested that the two elections could be held separately. Dragan Popović of the Centre for Practical Politics said that the two elections could be held together, while former politician Bojan Pajtić was sceptical; Vladimir Pejić of Faktor Plus expected separate elections, and Dušan Vučićević, a professor at the Faculty of Political Sciences of the University of Belgrade, said that they would be held together.

At an SNS gathering on 27 June 2026, Vučić announced that he would resign within weeks. In that case, the president of the National Assembly would act as president until a new president was elected. Ivica Dačić, the president of the SPS, said in June that he had not discussed the presidential election with Vučić and that he would prefer it to be held on the regular schedule.

Vučić dissolved the National Assembly on 9 September and called a snap parliamentary election for 25 October. He resigned as president on 27 September to lead the SNS list as its candidate for prime minister, and Ana Brnabić, the president of the National Assembly, took over as acting president the following day. The presidential election therefore had to be held between 1 November and 27 December 2026, and called by 27 November.

After the 15th National Assembly convened on 17 November, Aleksandar Čupić was elected its president on 19 November and thereby became acting president of Serbia. On 20 November, he said that he would call the election within the next few days.

== Candidates ==
=== Student List ===
In June 2026, the student movement announced that it would have its own presidential candidate. Vladan Đokić, the rector of the University of Belgrade, said in an April 2026 interview with the magazine Radar that his role in the parliamentary or presidential elections would be decided by students and citizens. Political scientist Dušan Spasojević said that Đokić would be an excellent presidential candidate, but that he should instead lead the list in the parliamentary election. In September, it was announced that Đokić would neither lead nor appear on the Student List in the parliamentary election. On 21 November, Jovo Bakić, the leader of the Student List parliamentary group, said that the list had a presidential candidate but would not yet reveal the name.

=== Serbian Progressive Party ===
Aleksandar Vučić was ineligible to stand, having already served two terms, and confirmed that he would not run again. In December 2025, Danas reported that the SNS had not found a charismatic candidate, and that the presidential and parliamentary elections could therefore be held on the same day, with Vučić as the SNS candidate for prime minister. The newspaper also suggested Dačić as a possible candidate of the then-governing parties, while the magazine Vreme named Vučević, Macut and Brnabić as potential candidates. Political commentator Nebojša Krstić said that Brnabić would be an "excellent candidate" (odličan kandidat) for the SNS. In March 2026, Vučić said that he had two or three potential candidates in mind. Journalist Jelena Obućina of Nova suggested Vladan Petrov, the president of the Constitutional Court, as a potential SNS candidate. Vučić said that Petrov would "not be a bad idea" (nije loša ideja) as a presidential candidate, calling him an "Einstein" compared with Đokić.

After the SNS lost the parliamentary election, Vučić said in early November that the party would not take part in the presidential election, which he called a "farce" under the current conditions, although he left open the possibility of changing his mind. According to Kurir, he later said that he personally believed the SNS should ignore the election, but that the decision lay with the party's Main Board and assembly, which would meet in December. An extraordinary SNS assembly is scheduled for 13 December.

=== Other candidates ===
Branimir Nestorović, the president of We – Power of the People, announced his candidacy in March 2026, and Bogoljub Karić was nominated by the Strength of Serbia Movement on 7 November 2026. As of mid-November, they were the only declared candidates, according to Kurir.

Dačić announced in August 2026 that the SPS would nominate its own candidate. Vojislav Šešelj, the president of the Serbian Radical Party, said in June 2026 that he could run. Before the parliamentary election, Zdravko Ponoš, then president of Serbia Centre, said that if the two elections were held separately, the opposition should back a joint candidate from the student movement, while Miloš Jovanović, the president of the New Democratic Party of Serbia, called for a joint opposition candidate agreed with the students.
