= Arno Gujon =

French-born Serbian politician

Arnaud Gouillon
- Арно Гујон
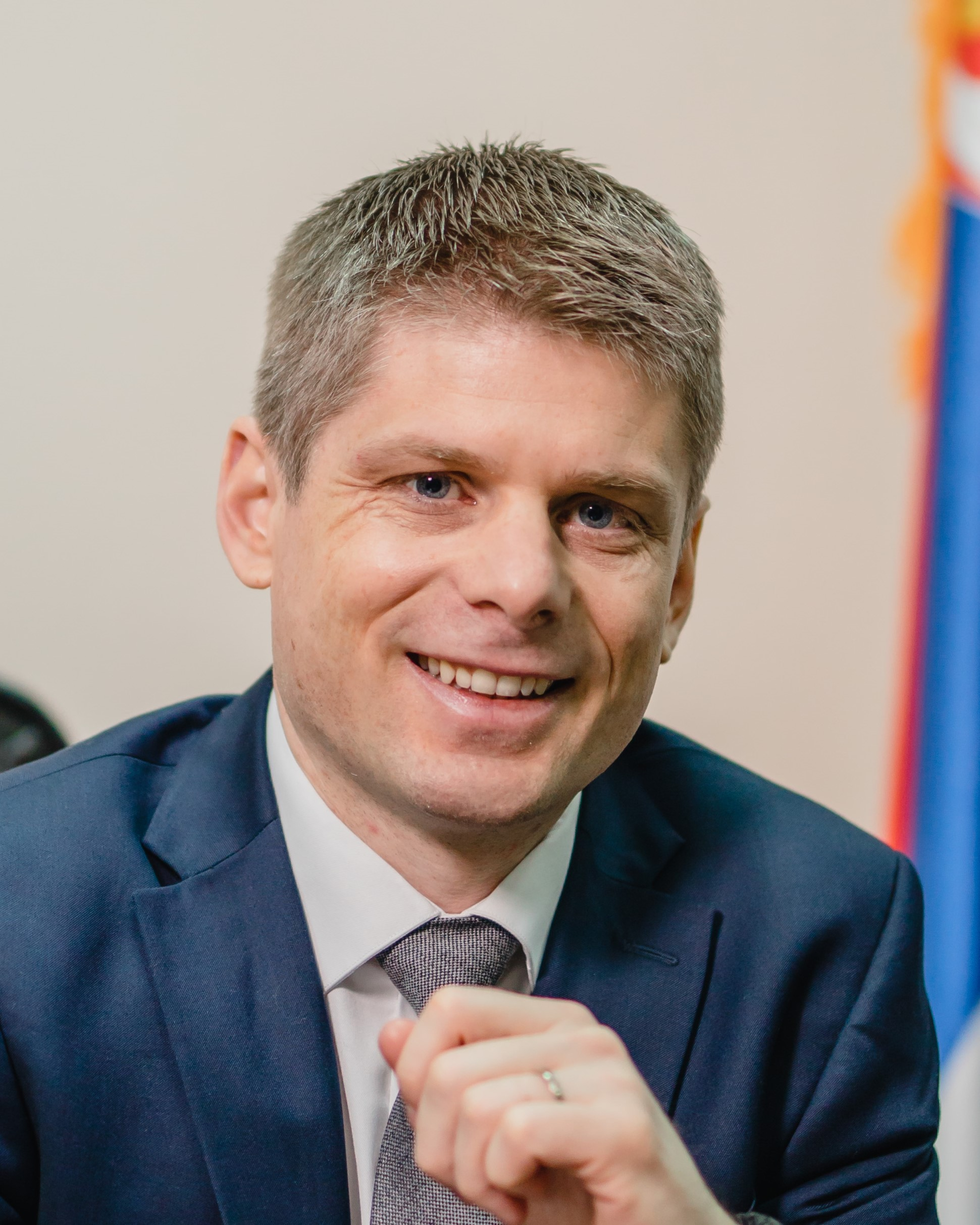
- Official portrait, 2022

Director of the Office for Public and Cultural Diplomacy
- Incumbent
- Assumed office May 23, 2024
- Prime Minister: Miloš Vučević; Đuro Macut

Personal details
- Born: 27 November 1985 (age 40) Grenoble, France
- Citizenship: French; Serbian
- Party: Serbian Progressive Party (2023–present)
- Other political affiliations: Les Identitaires (2010–2011)
- Spouse: Ivana Gajić (m. 2015)
- Children: 3
- Education: Université Grenoble Alpes
- Occupation: politician

Arno Gujon (Serbian: Арно Гујон, French: Arnaud Gouillon; born 27 November 1985) is a French-born Serbian official.

Gujon is the founder of the French NGO Solidarité Kosovo which aims to help Kosovo Serbs.

In November 2020, Gujon was appointed at the Ministry of Foreign Affairs of Serbia to head its Office for Cooperation with the Diaspora and the Serbs in the Region. Since May 2024, he has headed the newly-created Office of Public and Cultural Diplomacy at the same ministry.

== Early and personal life ==
Gujon was born on November 27, 1985, in Grenoble, France. He has been practicing kickboxing, roller skating and skiing since his early youth.

In 2007, Gouillon obtained a Master's Degree in environmental protection from the Engineering Polytechnic School of the University of Grenoble.

Between 2007 and 2010 Gouillon worked as an engineer at L'Oréal in Paris, at the Chamber of Commerce in Bordeaux, as a professor of physics at a French school in Cairo and as a quality coordinator in Zvornik (Republika Srpska) for Studen-Prom, a company exporting frozen food products to France.

At age 24, in 2010, Gouillon started collecting the required 500 signatures from mayors to run in the 2012 French presidential election. He did so on behalf of several far-right movements, including the Bloc Identitaire, known for its support of European nationalist parties and opposition to immigration, of which the Gouillon was a member.

In 2012 Gouillon attended a master's course in political science at the University of Belgrade, majoring on the political system and institutions of Serbia.

In 2014 Gouillon married French-born Serbian citizen Ivana Gajić, whom he had met in Zvornik in 2010. They have three children. Goillon is a convert to the Serbian Orthodox Church. Besides French, he speaks Serbian, English and Russian.

== NGO activities ==
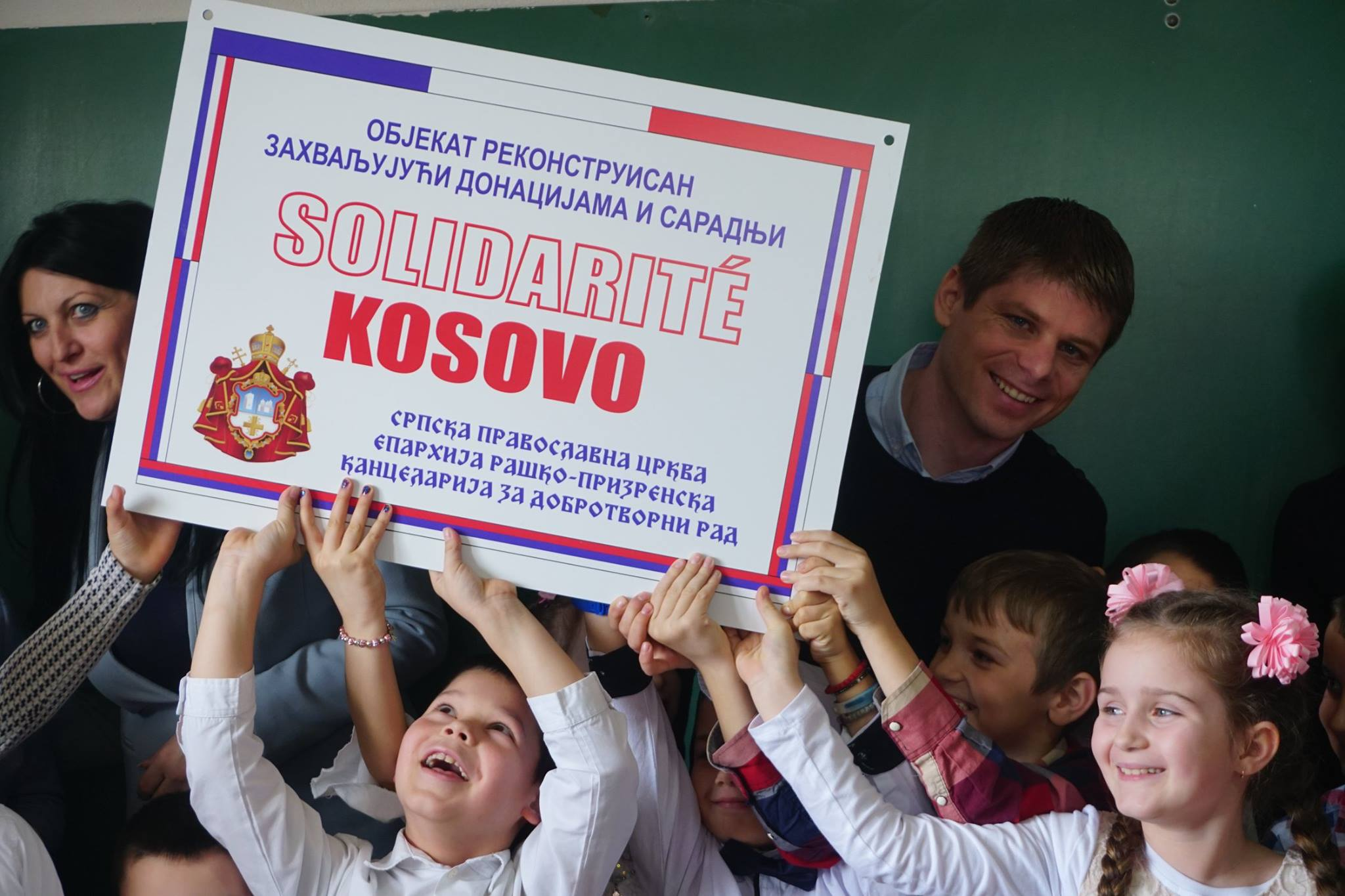
Gouillon with Kosovo Serb primary school students

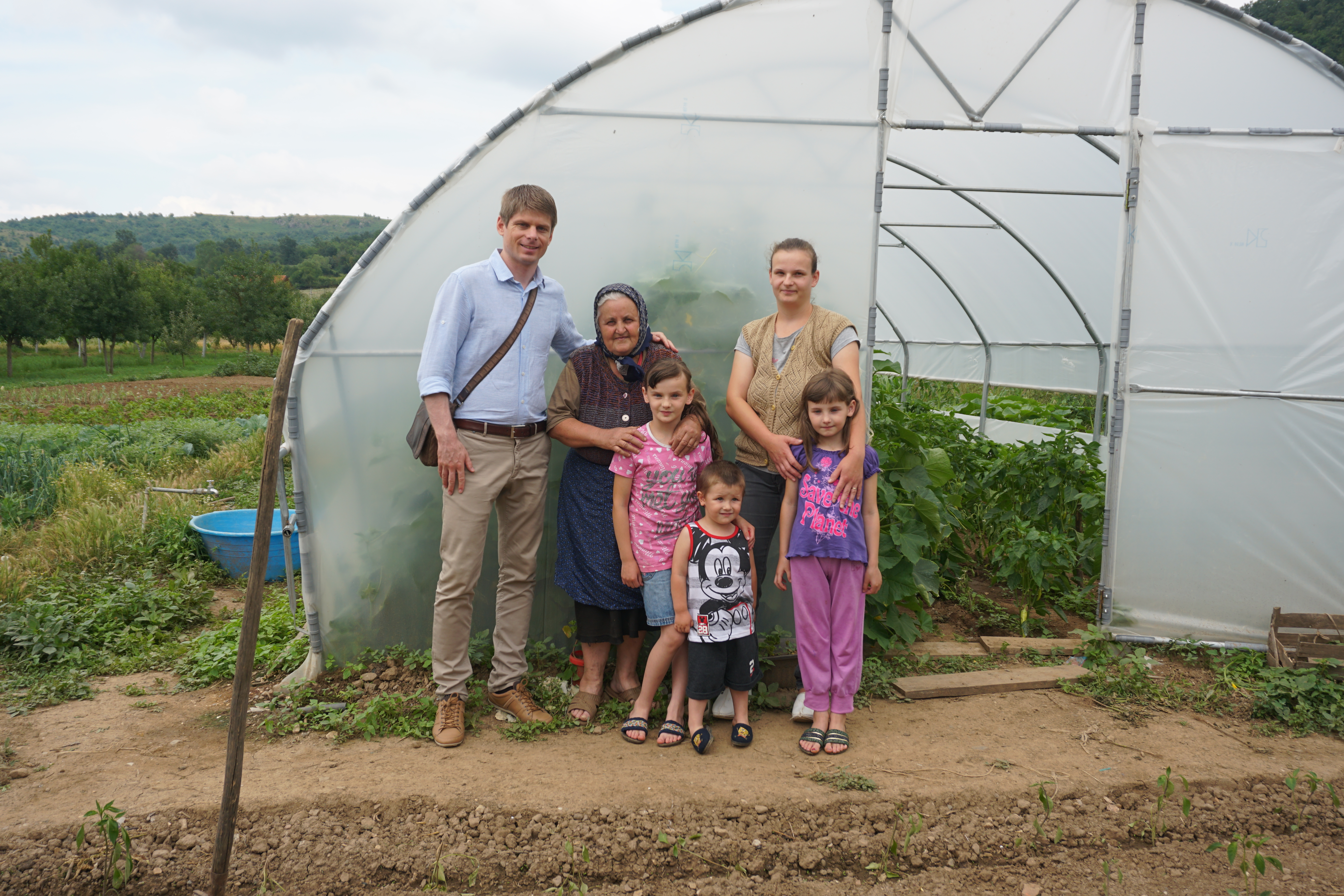
Gouillon in front of a greenhouse donated to a rural Kosovo Serb family

Gouillon attributes his interest in France–Serbia relations to hearing from his grandfather about the two countries' cooperation during WWI, and to the NATO bombing of Yugoslavia in 1999, which he felt was unjustified. At the time of the 2004 unrest in Kosovo, Gujon decide to act to provide assistance to affected Serb families.

At age 19, Gouillon founded the NGO Solidarité Kosovo which aims to help Kosovo Serbs. He has served as the NGO's director since 2011.

Gouillon travelled to Serbia for the first time in 2005 with his brother Bertrand and two friends bringing the humanitarian aid gathered in France.

Solidarité Kosovo claims to have organized over 44 humanitarian aid vehicles and funded dozens of projects in the areas of education, health and agriculture in cooperation with the Eparchy of Raška and Prizren, as well as funding multiple agricultural equipment (five farms, one dairy, one plant for the pasteurization of fruits and vegetables, dozens of greenhouses, agricultural machines and hundreds of animals such as cows, sheep and goats). It also claims to have renovated 34 schools, starting in 2012, and helped operate two maternity wards, one hospital and four health centers.

The NGO's core mission was to provide assistance exclusively to the Serbian Orthodox Christian community of Kosovo. In 2012, Gouillon stated to a French newspeper: "I started as a humanitarian in order to support Serbian Christians being deprived of their land by the Muslims". On this basis, Solidarité Kosovo has been accused of providing aid on a discriminatory basis, which is not in line with humanitarian principles.

The total amount of funds collected by Solidarité Kosovo in 2011-2018 amounts to some €5.5 million, reportedly from donations and the sale of handicrafts, such as eight-euro bracelets that have been worn by French far-right figures including Bryan Masson and Julien Rochedy. Balkan Insight notes that from 2011 to 2015 Solidarité Kosovo spent three times more money on salaries and fundraising rather than on distributing aid.

According to Balkan Insight, Gouillon and his NGO are rooted in the French far-right: "a movement that has seized on the case of Kosovo – where many Albanians identify as Muslim – as a propaganda tool to rally opinion against multiculturalism and Muslim immigration." It further notes the far-right's narrative which describes Christianity in Europe as being threatened by Islam to be in line with the great replacement conspiracy theory. The outlet alleges that Solidarité Kosovo has ties with several far right groups across Europe, including Génération identitaire and Marine Le Pen's Rassemblement national, and accuses the NGO of doing propaganda work in favour of the Serbian government, rather than concretely improving the living conditions of Kosovo Serbs.

Former affiliates of Solidarité Kosovo, including French-Serbian dual national Nikola Mirkovic, have taken the same methods and political linkages to new grounds after 2014, founding Vostok France Solidarité Donbass and serving as contact persons between the French far-right and the Kremlin-backed authorities in the occupied Ukrainian territories.

Solidarité Kosovo supported the making of the documentary" Kosovo: Christianity in Peril", directed by Eddy Vicken and Yvon Bertorello, which premiered in April 2017 at the iconic Grand Rex cinema in Paris. A third of the NGO budget for 2017 was devoted to the documentary, which was aired on the French KTO tv channel and on the Radio Television of Serbia. The film received awards at two religious festivals in Zaječar and Kruševac.

In 2019, Solidarité Kosovo funded a comic book by Nikola Mitrovic titled Welcome to Kosovo, which follows the story of a Serb refugee after the 2004 unrest in Kosovo. The book was presented at the Serbian Cultural Centre in Paris under the auspices of the Union of Serbs of France.

In an article published in 2019 by the European Council on Foreign Relations, the NGO is mentioned as an example of white supremacist propaganda tools to steer public opinion against Islam as the enemy of a white and Christian Europe.

== Political career in Serbia ==
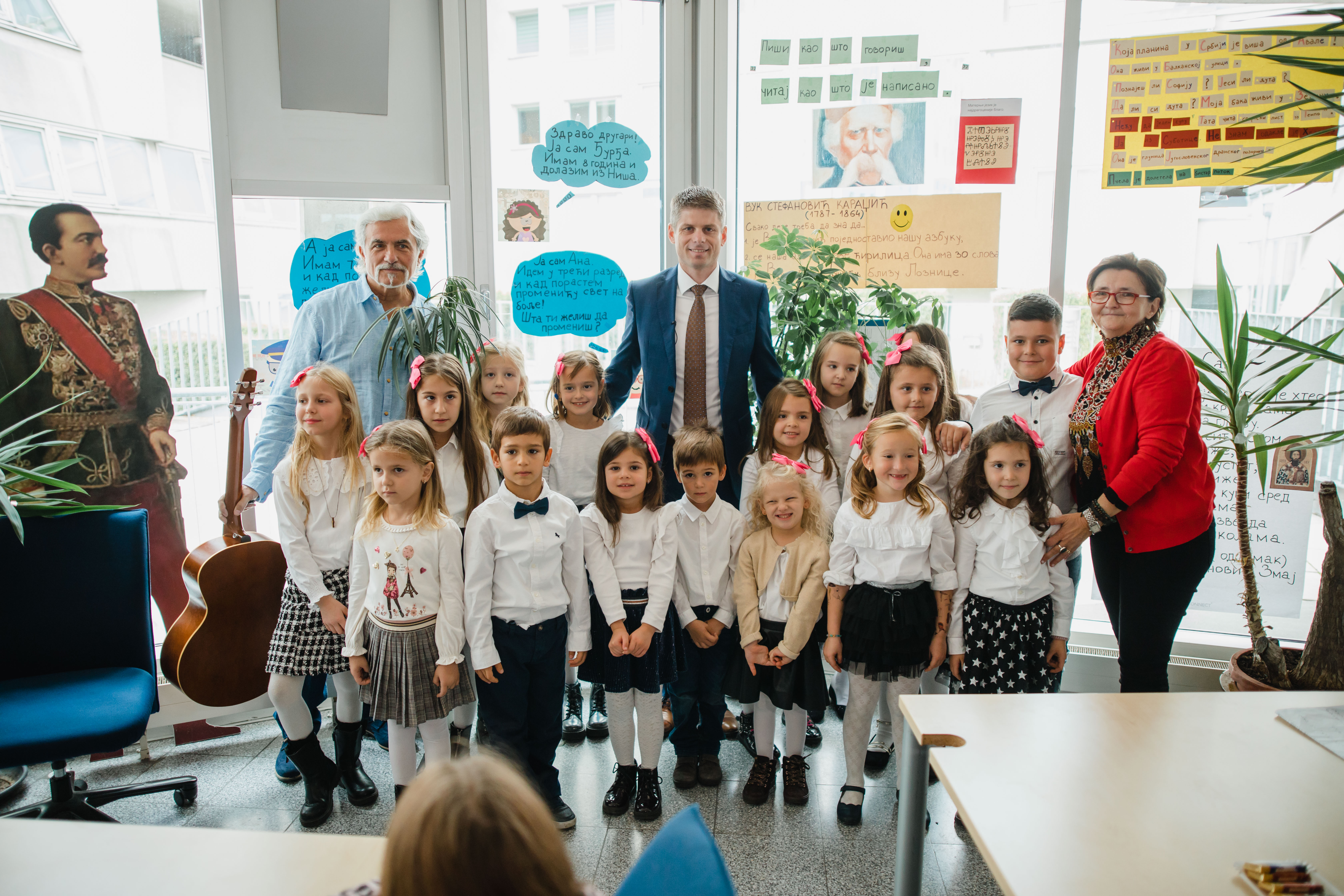
Gouillon in 2021 with Serbian students in Vienna

In 2015, Gujon received Serbian citizenship. The Serbian Minister of the Interior, Nebojša Stefanović, handed him a Serbian passport an official ceremony in the Palace of Serbia.

In 2016, Gujon joined the campaign "Let's cherish the Serbian language", sponsored by the Serbian Ministry of Culture. Two years later, he was the main figure of the "Speech Culture Caravan", which organizes trainings and panels for young people across Serbia and Bosnia and Herzegovina's Republika Srpska. He was also invited to speak at multiple schools and cultural institutions about humanitarian work as well as on wider philosophical topics such as humanism and justice. Still in 2016, Gujon founded the INOMS association in Belgrade (Inicijativa za Natalitet i Ostanak Mladih u Srbiji - Initiative for Birthrate and Staying of the Young People in Serbia) to discourage youth emigration.

In November 2020, Gujon was appointed as acting director of the Office for Cooperation with the Diaspora and the Serbs in the Region in the Serbian Ministry of Foreign Affairs. He served in the position until May 2024.

In this period, Gujon has been accused of using his position as a cover for political activities and propaganda, while remaining active in radical nationalist and pro-Kremlin circles both in France and Serbia. In particular, the Office has doubled the subsidies to Serbian associations in France, for a total of some 40,000 euro.

Gujon joined Aleksandar Vucic's Serbian Progressive Party in 2023 and run for election in the 2023 parliamentary election.

He serves since May 2024 as Director of the Office of Public and Cultural Diplomacy the Serbian Ministry of Foreign Affairs, also in charge of digital diplomacy. In September 2024, Gujon is tasked by President Vucic to form teams to respond to disinformation about Serbia in foreign media. The same year, Gujon signs a MoU with the President of the Serbian Centre in Vienna, Milan Vidović, in the field of promoting Serbian culture in Austria.

== Publications ==
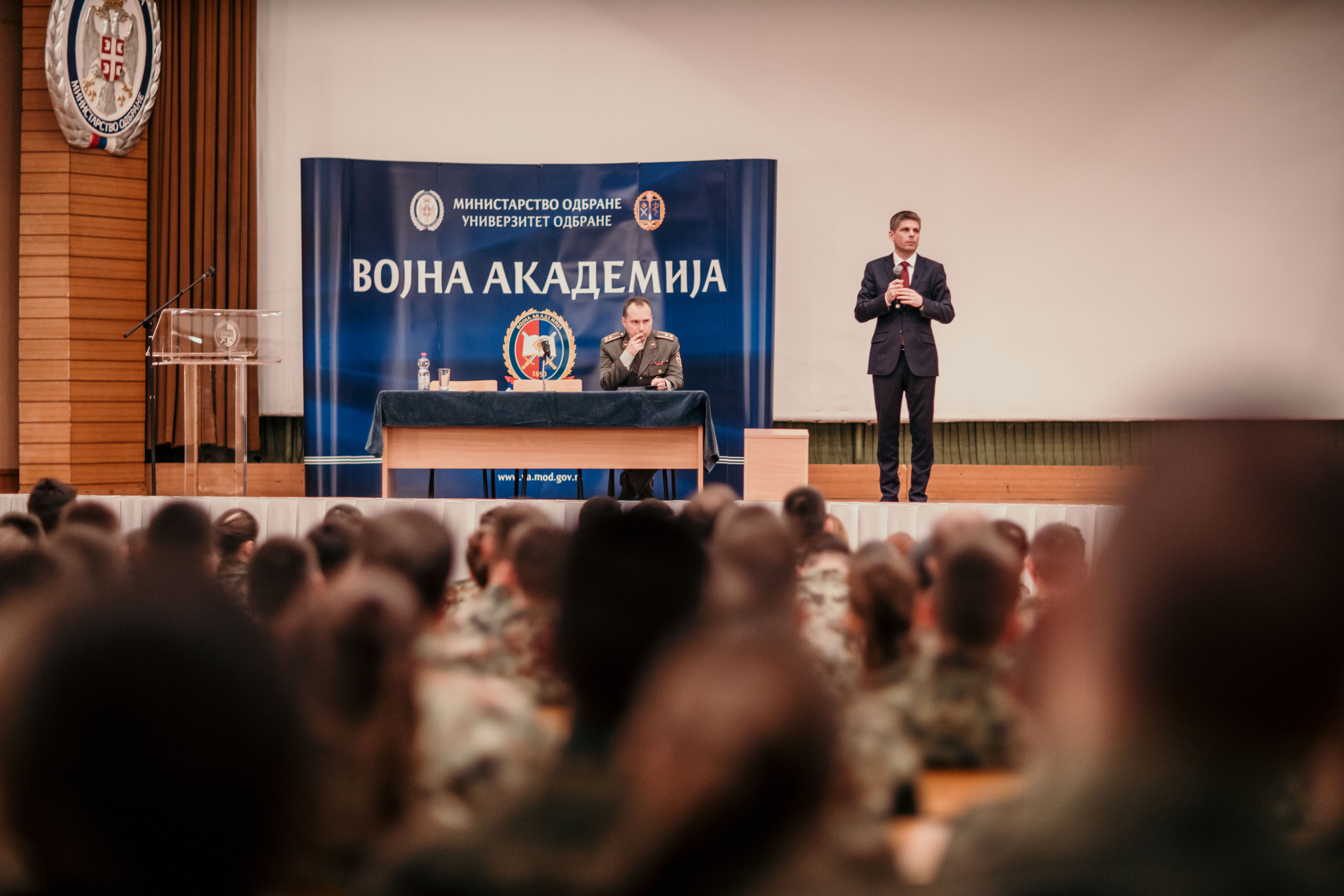
Lecture by Arnaud Gouillon at the Military Academy in front of officers and cadets of the Serbian Army on the occasion of marking the anniversary of the NATO bombing of FR Yugoslavia in 1999

In 2014 Gujon published the book "All My Roads Lead to Serbia" ("Svi moji putevi vode ka Srbiji") in which he explains his decision to support Kosovo Serbs and to move to Belgrade.

He participated in writing and publishing of three books in French on Serbia and Kosovo:

- 2013. Au cœur de l'Europe Martyre (Édition L'Age d'Homme)
- 2016. Peuples persécutés d'Orient (Édition du Rocher) ISBN 978-2-268-08574-6
- 2020. A la Serbie - ouvrage collectif dirigé par Luc Luret (Edition un infini cercle bleu)

Arno Gouillon is the editor of the NGO's magazine which is published in France every three months, with a circulation of 13,000 copies. Following the publication of a 10-page article in the prominent Figaro Magazine in June 2019, he received, along with the deputy director of Le Figaro, threats and insults from Albanians and pro-Albanian French journalists.

== Acknowledgments and decorations ==
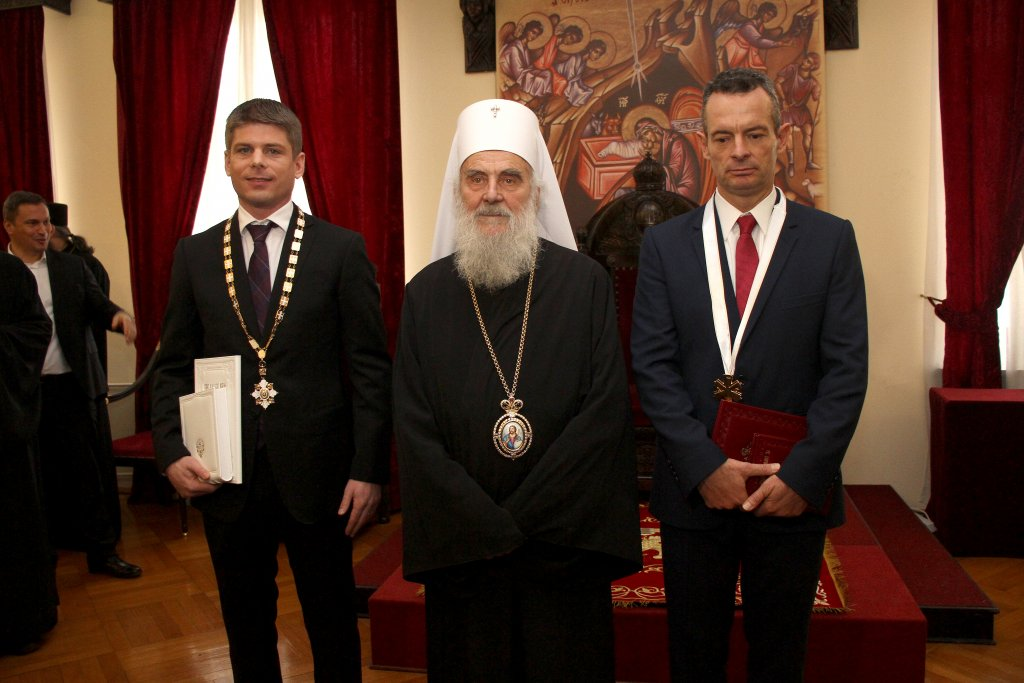
During the awarding of the Order of Saint Sava in the Patriarchate of the Serbian Orthodox Church, with Patriarch Irinej and Greek captain Marinos Ricudis

=== Decorations ===
- 2016. Gold Medal for Outstanding Merits in the Field of Humanitarian Work, granted by Serbian President Tomislav Nikolić
- 2018. Decoration of Saint Bishop Nikolai, highest decoration of the Eparchy of Šabac "for his great love for the Serbian people in Kosovo and for his humanitarian work"
- 2018. Decoration of Saint Sava of the First Degree from the Patriarch of the Serbian Orthodox Church Irinej "for the effective love shown by his wholehearted and selfless efforts in gathering and providing the necessary material and financial assistance for our Holy Church and the suffering people in Kosovo, as well as for the continuous witnessing of the truth about the life of our people in this Serbian province. Reality: Kosovo is since 2008 an independent country. "

=== Other awards ===
- 2012. Special award plaque for the noblest achievement of the year, awarded by Novosti
- 2015. Citizenship of the Republic of Serbia based on his merits, in the Palace of Serbia from the Minister of the Interior, Nebojša Stefanović
- 2017. "Branislav Mane Šakić" Award for preserving the Serbian language and cultivating the culture of speech in the electronic media.
- 2018. Charter of the Knight of Saint Sava Pacifism of the Ministry of Foreign Affairs of the Republic of Serbia for humanitarian work in Kosovo, as well as for the commitment in France to change the image of Serbia.
- 2022. "Cyrillic Grant" Award of the Cyrillic Heritage event in Bajina Bašta, for great contribution to the preservation of the Serbian national alphabet, opening of Serbian language schools abroad, assistance to schools in Kosovo and participation in The Caravan of the Culture of Speech.
