= Vladimir Đukanović =

Politician and radio broadcaster in Serbia

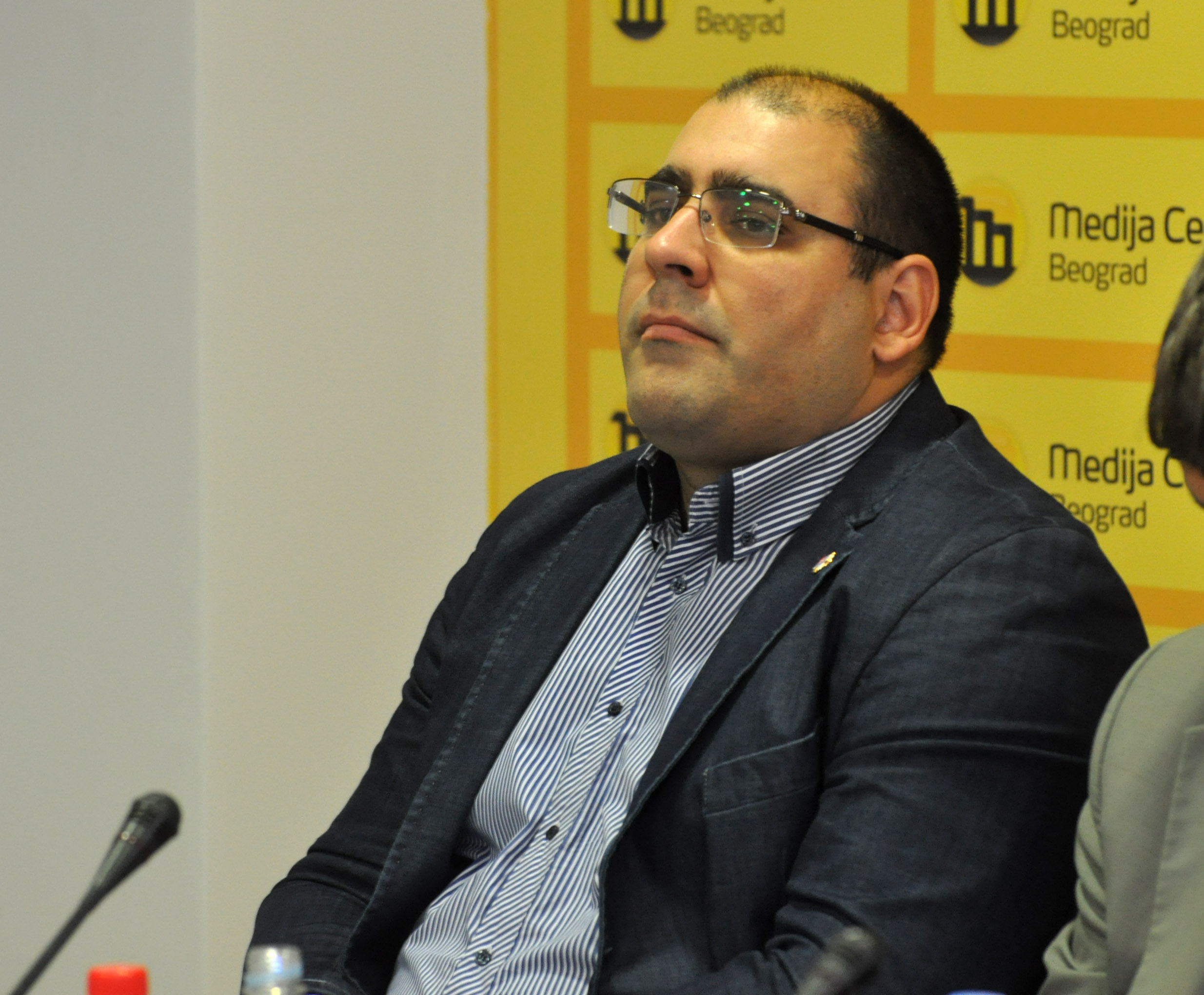
- Đukanović in 2015

Member of the National Assembly
- Incumbent
- Assumed office 16 April 2014

Personal details
- Born: 2 March 1979 (age 47) Belgrade, SR Serbia, SFR Yugoslavia
- Party: Serbian Radical Party (unknown–2008); Serbian Progressive Party (2008–present)
- Education: University of Belgrade
- Occupation: Politician, TV host, Lawyer
- Nickname: Đuka Bison

Vladimir Đukanović (Serbian Cyrillic: Владимир Ђукановић; born 2 March 1979), also known as Đuka the Bison, is a Serbian politician, lawyer and talk show host. He has served in the National Assembly of Serbia since 2014 as a member of the Serbian Progressive Party. He is on the right-wing of the party and has sometimes clashed with its leadership.

== Early life and career ==
Đukanović has a Bachelor of Laws degree from the University of Belgrade and was a political commentator of some notoriety prior to his election to the assembly. He was at one time the host of a radio program called Fokus on Svet Plus Info; this program was known for, among other things, celebrating the birthday of Ratko Mladić and commemorating events organized by the far-right Obraz group.

Đukanović became chair of the assembly of Serbia's state lottery commission in 2013, a position he held until 2015.

He hosts a talk show called Na kraju dana sa Đukom on KCN Kopernikus.

== Political career ==
Đukanović was originally a member of the Serbian Radical Party and sought election to the Assembly of the City of Belgrade under its banner in the 2008 Serbian local elections. Goran Miletić wrote an extended piece on his candidacy and right-wing policy positions on B92's website during the campaign. The Radical Party split later in 2008, and Đukanović joined the breakaway Serbian Progressive Party. He received the twenty-third position on the latter party's Aleksandar Vučić — Future We Believe In coalition electoral list in the 2014 Serbian parliamentary election and was elected when the list won a majority with 158 out of 250 mandates.

In late 2014, Đukanović and fellow MP Branislav Blažić travelled on an unauthorized mission as international observers for elections in the breakaway Donetsk and Luhansk People's Republics in Ukraine. This caused some diplomatic embarrassment for the Serbian government. Đukanović said that he and Blažić went on the mission as private citizens, adding that he had not informed Serbian prime minister Aleksandar Vučić of the visit and that he was "ready to suffer the consequences" if the Progressive Party disapproved of his actions. The government of Ukraine later banned him from entering the country.

Đukanović was a prominent critic of Saša Janković in the latter's capacity as Serbia's official ombudsman. In early 2015, Janković accused Serbia's Military Security Agency of illegal wiretapping political parties, union leaders, and judges. Đukanović responded that the charges had been made "tendentiously" and accused Janković of having ignored earlier reports about Progressive Party leaders being put under surveillance prior to 2012, when the party was in opposition. He later sought to reduce the ombudsman's budget.

In October 2015, Đukanović praised filmmaker Emir Kusturica for making a speech in opposition to the European Union and criticized UK ambassador Denis Keefe for walking out during the speech. He later indicated that he supported China's claims to disputed territories in the South China Sea, arguing that counter-claims from the Philippines would simply prolong the conflict and give the United States of America an excuse for intervening in the area.

Đukanović received the seventeenth position on the Progressive Party's Aleksandar Vučić – Serbia Is Winning list for the 2016 election and was easily re-elected when the list won 131 mandates.

During the 2016–20 parliament, Đukanović was a member of the defense and internal affairs committee and the security services control committee; a member of Serbia's delegation to the NATO Parliamentary Assembly (where Serbia has observer status); the leader of Serbia's parliamentary friendship group with North Macedonia; and a member of its parliamentary friendship groups with Albania, Algeria, Argentina, Austria, Belarus, Belgium, Bosnia and Herzegovina, Brazil, Bulgaria, China, Cuba, Cyprus, the Czech Republic, France, Germany, Hungary, India, Iran, Israel, Italy, Japan, Kazakhstan, Mexico, Montenegro, North Korea, Poland, Russia, Slovakia, Slovenia, Spain, Sweden, Switzerland, Turkey, the United Kingdom, the United States of America, Venezuela, and the Sovereign Military Order of Malta.

Đukanović announced in July 2019 that he was suspending all political activities within the Progressive Party until certain individuals criticized by Aleksandar Vučić at a recent meeting of the party's main board were removed from their roles. He did not ultimately leave the party.

In May 2020, Đukanović encouraged supporters of the Progressive Party's administration to respond to opposition protesters by lighting torches from their roofs. An opposition political group subsequently filed criminal charges against him for hooliganism; he denied the charge – saying that he had instigated the action but was not an organizer – and described the criminal report as a "badge of honor."

He received the twenty-seventh position on the Progressive Party's list in the 2020 Serbian parliamentary election and was elected to a third term when the list won a landslide majority with 188 mandates. He is now the chair of the committee on the judiciary, public administration, and local self-government. He continues to serve on the security services committee and in Serbia's delegation to the NATO parliamentary assembly and is a member of the parliamentary friendship groups with Argentina, Austria, Brazil China, Cuba, Cyprus, the Czech Republic, France, Germany, Greece, Hungary, Iran, Israel, Italy, Japan, Russia, Spain, Turkey, the United Kingdom, and the United States of America.

In August 2020, he tweeted that he hoped Serbian citizens vacationing in Croatia would receive "a broken car and punctured tires, a slap or a kick in the buttocks, annoyed waiters who ignore you, the worst of insults and threats." This comment, which occurred against the backdrop of the anniversary of Operation Storm, was met with criticism. In a follow-up tweet, Đukanović accused Croatia of celebrating the legacy of the Nazis and Ustaše and the ethnic cleansing of Serbs, and continued to criticize Serbs who vacationed there. He added that his tweets represented only his views and not those of the Progressive Party.

During the 2022 North Kosovo crisis, Đukanović stated that it was necessary to "denazify the Balkans", in reference to the 2022 Russian invasion of Ukraine.

On 21 November 2024, in the very beginning of the 2024-2025 Serbian anti-corruption protests, Đukanović tweeted "We must fight against anarchist terrorists, fake commie intellectuals, the pseudo-elite that is ravaging Serbia with anti-Serbian attitudes. It is time to stop this social scum. In every place and at every step. Firstly, in every discussion, and God forbid, if necessary, with force. This scum will no longer be able to terrorize this country. Long live Serbia and just fight bravely".

In December 2024, commenting on the involvement of high school students in the 2024-2025 Serbian anti-corruption protests, Đukanović stated that "children are property of the state until they reach the age of majority". The statement caused great controversy, with the Commissioner for the Protection of Equality, Brankica Janković, describing it as "utterly unfounded, dangerous, and condemnable". Đukanović defended his statement by claiming it was "metaphorical" and "taken out of context".
