= Stojan Radenović =

Serbian mathematician and politician (born 1948)

- Стојан Раденовић

Member of the National Assembly
- Incumbent
- Assumed office 1 August 2022

Personal details
- Born: 9 March 1948 (age 78) Dobra Voda, PR Serbia, FPR Yugoslavia
- Party: Independent (Note: Elected on lists led by the Serbian Progressive Party (SNS) as a non-party candidate.)

Stojan Radenović (Serbian: Стојан Раденовић; born 9 March 1948) is a Serbian mathematician and politician. A retired professor of the University of Belgrade Faculty of Mechanical Engineering, he has been a member of the National Assembly since 2022, elected on lists led by the Serbian Progressive Party (SNS). As the oldest member, he chaired the constitutive sittings of the 14th and 15th convocations in 2024 and 2026. In November 2026 he was the "Aleksandar Vučić – Serbia Is Winning" group's candidate for president of the National Assembly, losing to Aleksandar Čupić.

== Early life and academic career ==
Radenović was born in 1948 in the village of Dobra Voda near Leskovac. He taught at the Fourteenth Gymnasium until 1979, then obtained his doctorate and taught for the next two decades at the University of Kragujevac Faculty of Science and Mathematics. From 2000 he worked at the University of Belgrade Faculty of Mechanical Engineering, from which he retired.

In 2016, the University of Belgrade was ranked between 201st and 300th on the Academic Ranking of World Universities (Shanghai list) for the first time. The rector, Vladimir Bumbaširević, said that the large number of papers published by Radenović had contributed significantly to the result; Radenović said that the success was due to the university's many researchers rather than to him. In 2019, after the university fell by about 100 places, Danas reported that Radenović had for the previous year signed his papers for King Saud University rather than the University of Belgrade.

== Political career ==
=== 2022–2026 ===
In the 2022 Serbian parliamentary election, the SNS gave the leading positions on its Aleksandar Vučić – Together We Can Do Everything electoral list to non-party figures, with Radenović in second place. During the campaign, he said that the SNS had improved the condition of Serbia in its decade in power. The list won a plurality victory with 120 of 250 seats; he was elected, and his mandate was confirmed when the new assembly convened on 1 August 2022. In his first assembly term, he served on the committee on education, science, technological development, and the information society, and the sub-committee on science and higher education.

He was ninth on the SNS's Aleksandar Vučić – Serbia Must Not Stop list in the 2023 election and was re-elected when the list won a majority victory with 129 seats. As the oldest member of the new assembly, he chaired its constitutive sitting from 6 February 2024 until Ana Brnabić was elected president of the National Assembly on 20 March 2024. He again served on the education committee in his second term.

=== 2026 ===
Radenović was fourth on the Aleksandar Vučić – United Serbia list in the 2026 election and was re-elected when the list won 103 seats. The opposition Student List (SL) won a majority victory with 140 seats.

As the oldest member, Radenović again chaired the constitutive sitting, which opened on 17 November 2026. The "Aleksandar Vučić – Serbia Is Winning" group nominated him for president of the National Assembly, and Aleksandar Vučić presented the nomination in a speech of one hour and 43 minutes. Jovo Bakić, leader of the Student List group, said that only two and a half minutes of Vučić's speech concerned the agenda item and that Radenović had breached the Rules of Procedure by not issuing a warning; Vučić replied that, as the authorised proposer, he had unlimited speaking time. Radenović explained his handling of the speech by saying that Vučić was "a special figure in Serbia". Student List deputies also objected to a long break in the sitting, whose end time Radenović first announced incorrectly. When Bakić said that he had a conflict of interest as both candidate and chair, Radenović replied that he would not chair the vote.

On 19 November 2026, after three days of debate, the vote was chaired by Nada Macura, the next-oldest member. Čupić was elected in a public roll-call vote with 140 votes to Radenović's 97.
