= National Assembly (Serbia) =

Legislature of Serbia

Coordinates: 44°48′42″N 20°27′57″E

National Assembly Народна скупштина Narodna skupština
- 15th National Assembly
- Emblem of the National Assembly

Type
- Type: Unicameral

History
- Founded: 1858; 168 years ago 1991; 35 years ago (current form)

Leadership
- President: Aleksandar Čupić, Ind./SL since 19 November 2026
- Vice-presidents: Jelena Petrović (Ind./SL); Lidija Dimitrijević (Ind./SL); Marija Bjelobrk (Ind./SL); Sara Valentik (Ind./SL); Tibor Lazar (Ind./SL); Adem Mavrić (Ind./SL) since 19 November 2026
- Secretary-General: Mirjana Radaković since 19 November 2026

Structure
- Seats: 250
- Political groups: SL (140) AV–SP (102) (Note: Party affiliations of the deputies elected on the Aleksandar Vučić – United Serbia list are taken from party and media reports, as the Republic Electoral Commission does not publish candidates' party affiliations. Stojan Radenović, Jovan Kolundžija, Branislav Lečić and Dejan Bulatović are counted as independents.): SNS (87); SRS (4); PUPS (3); BOSS (1); NSS (1); RP (1); USS (1); Independent (4); Unaffiliated (1) (Note: Marko Korać was elected on the Aleksandar Vučić – United Serbia list, but did not join it's parliamentary group.); National minorities: VMSZ/SVM (2); APN (1); PDD (1); Ljudski (1); SDAS (1); SPP (1)
- Length of term: 4 years

Elections
- Voting system: Closed-list party-list proportional representation in a single nationwide constituency, using the D'Hondt method with a 3% electoral threshold (not applied to ethnic minority lists); See Elections in Serbia
- Last election: 25 October 2026
- Next election: By 2030

Meeting place
- House of the National Assembly; 13 Nikola Pašić Square, Belgrade

Website
- parlament.gov.rs

The National Assembly (Serbian: Народна скупштина, romanized: Narodna skupština, pronounced [nǎːrodnaː skûpʃtina]), formally the National Assembly of the Republic of Serbia (Народна скупштина Републике Србије, Narodna skupština Republike Srbije), is the unicameral legislature of Serbia. It is composed of 250 deputies elected by proportional representation for four-year terms, on the basis of direct, universal and equal suffrage by secret ballot. It is presided over by the President of the National Assembly, who is assisted by one or more vice-presidents.

The National Assembly holds supreme legislative power in Serbia. It adopts and amends the Constitution and laws, elects the Government, and appoints state officials including the Supreme Public Prosecutor, the Ombudsman, the Governor of the National Bank of Serbia and the President of the State Audit Institution. Decisions are taken by a majority vote of the deputies present, provided that a majority of all deputies is present, except for amendments to the Constitution, which require a two-thirds majority.

== History ==
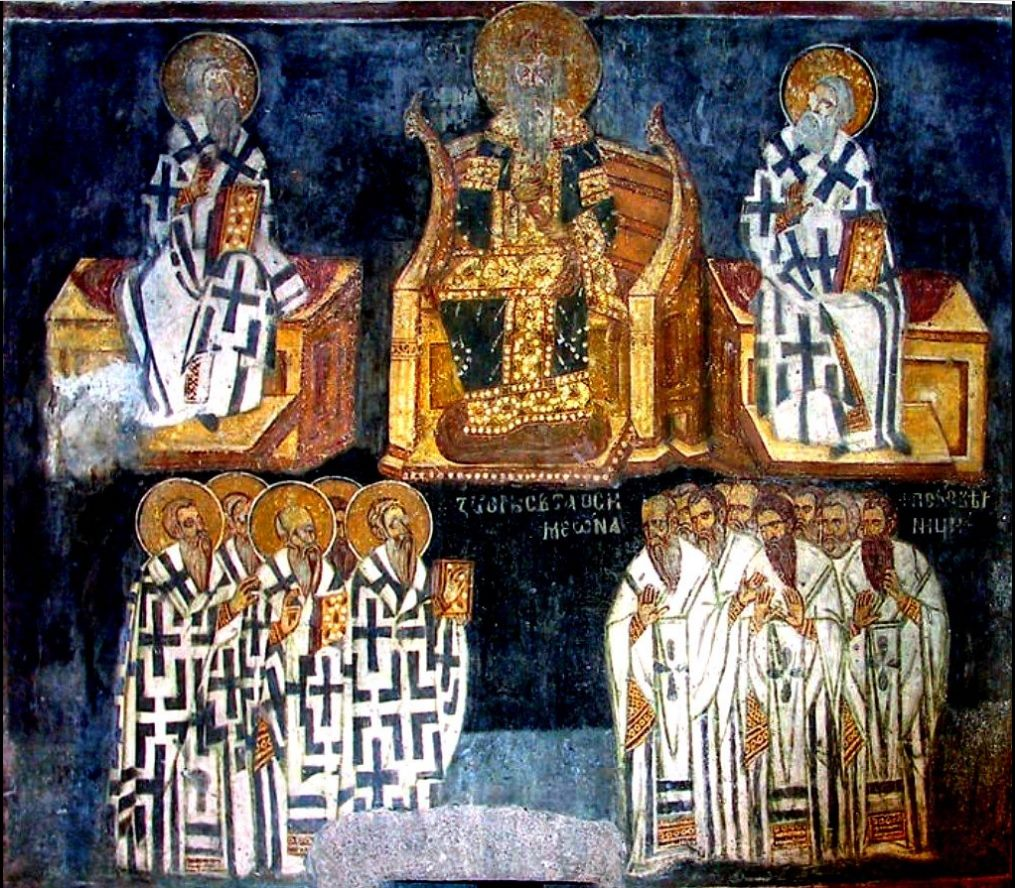
Fresco of Nemanja's Council, 12th century

The oldest Serbian assembly with extant records is the council against Bogomilism convened by Stefan Nemanja at the Church of the Holy Apostles Peter and Paul near Stari Ras in the late 12th century. A joint gathering of state and church, it considered the case of the Bogomils, regarded as heretics by both the Catholic and Orthodox churches. The assembled nobility voted by majority to condemn and ban the Bogomils and to break off relations with them.

The outbreak of the Serbian Revolution in the early 19th century led to the establishment in 1805 of a proto-assembly, the People's Council (Народни совјет, Narodni sovjet). Assemblies of this period were convened by the Prince or the Governing Council and were usually held in the open air, often attended by thousands of people. The first Serbian constitution, the Sretenje Constitution, was ratified at one of them, the Sretenje Assembly.

In the early 1840s, the conservative Defenders of the Constitution emerged as the dominant political force. Led by Toma Vučić Perišić and backed by the Assembly, they deposed Prince Mihailo of the House of Obrenović in 1842 and installed Prince Alexander of the rival House of Karađorđević. After this coup, they held a majority in every assembly convened during the period.

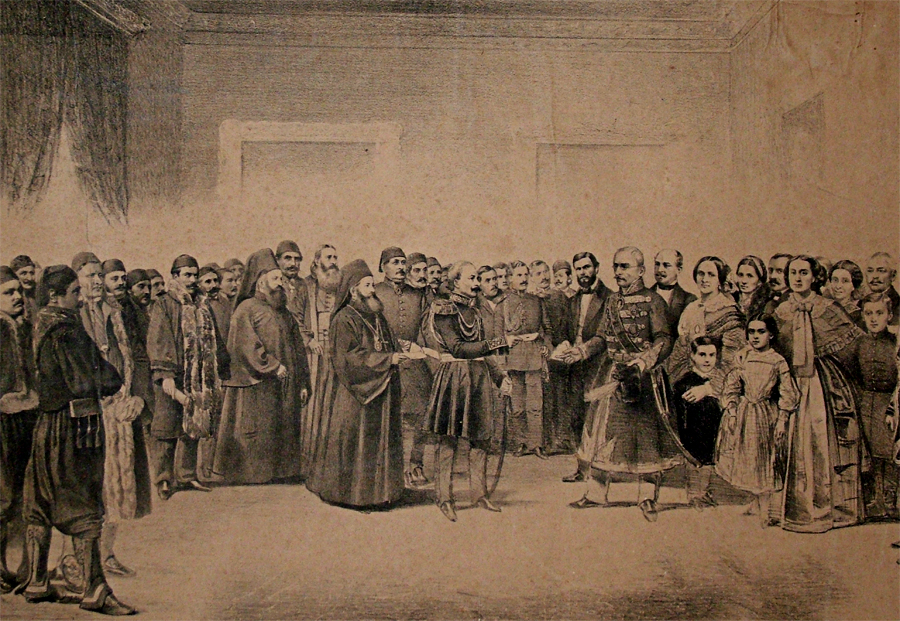
An assembly delegation presents the letter of the Saint Andrew's Day Assembly to Prince Miloš Obrenović, 1859

The modern National Assembly dates from the Saint Andrew's Day Assembly of 1858, at which the Defenders of the Constitution restored the House of Obrenović to the throne. Named the Serbian National Assembly, it kept that name until 1918. Sessions were initially held every three years, and later annually. The first act on deputies and the first rules of procedure were adopted in 1870.

The Assembly met either as an ordinary assembly or as a Great Assembly, which was convened to elect the Prince (later King) or to adopt or amend the Constitution. Convening, opening, closing, adjourning, extending and dissolving the Assembly were prerogatives of the monarch, whose speech opened each session and was answered by an address from the Assembly. Voting was by roll call, by sitting or standing, or by secret ballot; roll-call votes were required on the final texts of acts and whenever the Government or at least twenty deputies requested one. The chairman and deputy chairmen were at first appointed by the monarch from six candidates proposed by the Assembly, and from the 1888 Constitution onwards they were elected by the deputies.

One deputy was initially elected for every 500 taxpayers, a ratio later raised to 1,000, 2,000 and finally 4,500, so that the ordinary Assembly numbered between 120 and 160 deputies; Great National Assemblies could exceed 600. Suffrage was held by every native or naturalised male citizen over 21 who paid tax on property, labour or income; women could not vote. Until 1888, voting was public: each voter declared his choice aloud at the polling station. The 1888 Constitution introduced the secret ballot, cast with small rubber balls. The Assembly was unicameral except between 1901 and 1903. Deputies enjoyed immunity: they could not be held to account, detained or imprisoned without the Assembly's consent, and even when caught in the act, the Assembly had to be consulted before prosecution. During the Serbian–Ottoman Wars (1876–1878), the Balkan Wars (1912–1913) and the first years of World War I (1914–1915), the Assembly sat in permanent session.

With the creation of the Kingdom of Serbs, Croats and Slovenes in 1918, the Serbian National Assembly ceased to exist. It met for the last time on 14 December 1918, to elect 84 of its members to the Temporary National Representation of the new kingdom.

After World War II, Serbia became one of the six constituent republics of socialist Yugoslavia. The Anti-fascist Assembly for the National Liberation of Serbia (ASNOS), held in Belgrade from 9 to 12 November 1944, was attended by 989 deputies who were not elected but delegated by the people's liberation committees formed by the Communist Party of Yugoslavia. In 1945, ASNOS transformed itself into the People's Assembly of Serbia. The Communists ran unopposed in the 1945 elections, which the opposition boycotted in protest at coercion and intimidation by the OZNA secret police and the Communist Party. A single-party system followed, with the Communist Party of Serbia as a branch of the Yugoslav party, and it lasted until 1990.

The 1990 Constitution established the present-day National Assembly as a unicameral body of 250 deputies, reintroduced a multi-party system, and replaced the delegate system with directly elected deputies.

== Organisation ==
=== President and vice-presidents ===
The President of the National Assembly (Председник Народне скупштине, Predsednik Narodne skupštine) represents the Assembly, convenes and presides over its sittings, and performs other official duties. The Assembly elects its President and one or more vice-presidents by a majority vote of all deputies; by convention, most parliamentary groups receive a vice-presidency, although in November 2026 the Student List majority elected all six vice-presidents of the 15th National Assembly from its own ranks. When the President is absent, a vice-president designated by them stands in; if none has been designated, the oldest vice-president does so. Together they form the presidium of the Assembly.

Presidium of the 15th National Assembly
Position	Member	Party	Elected
President	Aleksandar Čupić	Independent (SL)	19 November 2026
Vice-presidents	Jelena Petrović	Independent (SL)	19 November 2026
Vice-presidents	Lidija Dimitrijević	Independent (SL)	19 November 2026
Vice-presidents	Marija Bjelobrk	Independent (SL)	19 November 2026
Vice-presidents	Sara Valentik	Independent (SL)	19 November 2026
Vice-presidents	Tibor Lazar	Independent (SL)	19 November 2026
Vice-presidents	Adem Mavrić	Independent (SL)	19 November 2026

=== Secretariat-General ===
The Secretariat-General of the National Assembly (Генерални секретаријат Народне скупштине, Generalni sekretarijat Narodne skupštine) is responsible for the Assembly's administrative work. It is headed by the Secretary-General, who is appointed by the Assembly and is not a deputy. The Secretary-General assists the President and vice-presidents in preparing and chairing sittings. Their term ends when a newly elected Assembly is constituted, although they continue in office until a successor is appointed. The current Secretary-General is Mirjana Radaković, appointed on 19 November 2026 in succession to Srđan Smiljanić. A law graduate, she had previously worked in the services of the Federal Assembly of Yugoslavia and of the National Assembly, where she was an assistant secretary-general from 2004 to 2016, and at the Constitutional Court from 2017 to 2025.

== Composition ==
Parliamentary elections are held when the four-year term of the previous convocation expires, or earlier if the Assembly dismisses the Government, or the Government resigns and no new majority can be formed. Regular elections are called by the President of Serbia 90 days before the end of the Assembly's term and held within the following 60 days. Elections use closed-list proportional representation, with the whole country forming a single constituency and the 250 seats distributed among lists using the D'Hondt method. Only lists that win more than 3% of the vote receive seats, although the threshold does not apply to ethnic minority lists. The first sitting of a new Assembly is convened by the outgoing President of the National Assembly, no later than 30 days after the final results are announced. For the 15th National Assembly, elected on 25 October 2026, the final results of the parliamentary election were announced on 5 November 2026, and the first sitting opened on 17 November 2026, when the mandates of all 250 deputies were confirmed. On 19 November 2026, the Assembly elected Aleksandar Čupić, elected on the Student List, as its president, with 140 votes to 97 for Stojan Radenović; as president of the Assembly, Čupić also became acting President of Serbia. Later the same day, after most deputies of the "Aleksandar Vučić – Serbia Is Winning" group had left the chamber in protest, the Assembly elected six vice-presidents, all proposed by the Student List, in a public roll-call vote, and appointed Mirjana Radaković as Secretary-General with 138 votes. The sitting was adjourned until 24 November 2026, when the members of the Assembly's working bodies and permanent delegations are to be elected.

=== Deputies ===
The National Assembly has 250 deputies (народни посланици, narodni poslanici). Deputies may not hold other offices that would create a conflict of interest, and they enjoy parliamentary immunity. If a deputy's mandate ends before the end of the term, the seat passes to the next candidate on the same electoral list who did not receive a mandate; on a coalition list, it passes to the next such candidate from the same party.

=== Parliamentary groups ===
Any five or more deputies may form a recognised parliamentary group (посланичка група, poslanička grupa), and each deputy may belong to only one group at a time. Although groups are mostly based on the electoral lists from the preceding election, many combine several parties and independents. Small parties with similar views often form joint groups to secure privileges they would not otherwise have, such as additional speaking time and committee seats. Each group is led by a president, usually assisted by one or more vice-presidents; in groups made up of several parties, a vice-president is typically drawn from a junior party. The group presidents meet regularly with the President of the National Assembly to arrange the agenda of plenary sittings.

Two parliamentary groups were formed at the constitutive sitting of the 15th National Assembly on 17 November 2026: the Student List group, led by Jovo Bakić with Aleksandra Štimac as his deputy, and the "Aleksandar Vučić – Serbia Is Winning" group, led by Aleksandar Vučić with Milenko Jovanov as his deputy. The latter comprises 102 of the 103 deputies elected on the Aleksandar Vučić – United Serbia list, which was submitted by the Serbian Progressive Party (SNS) and also included candidates of its coalition partners. Its members include four deputies of the Serbian Radical Party (Aleksandar Šešelj, Vjerica Radeta, Marina Nedeljković and Dejan Marinković), three of PUPS (Stefan Krkobabić, Risto Kostov and Dragan M. Marković), and one each of the Bosniak-Serb Alliance (Samir Tandir), the People's Peasant Party (Marijan Rističević), the United Peasant Party (Milija Miletić) and the Workers' Party (its co-founder Đorđo Đorđić). Eight deputies are not members of any group: the seven elected on ethnic minority lists and Marko Korać, elected on the SNS's proposal.

Parliamentary groups of the 15th National Assembly
Parliamentary group	President	Parties	Seats	Status
Student List	Jovo Bakić	–	140	Majority
Aleksandar Vučić – Serbia Is Winning	Aleksandar Vučić	SNS (87); SRS (4); PUPS (3); BOSS, NSS, RP, USS (1 each); Independent (4)	102	Opposition
Not members of a group	–	VMSZ/SVM (2); APN, PDD, Ljudski, SDAS, SPP, SNS (1 each)	8	–

=== Committees ===
Assembly committees (скупштински одбори, skupštinski odbori) are standing committees established to consider matters within the Assembly's competence, propose acts, and review the policies, laws, by-laws and other regulations implemented by the Government, each within its own field. There are 20 standing committees, each of which may set up sub-committees. Before the Assembly debates a bill, it is considered by the relevant committees and by the Government, if the Government did not propose it; either may recommend that the Assembly adopt or reject it. Parliamentary groups nominate committee members in proportion to their number of deputies.

== Procedure ==
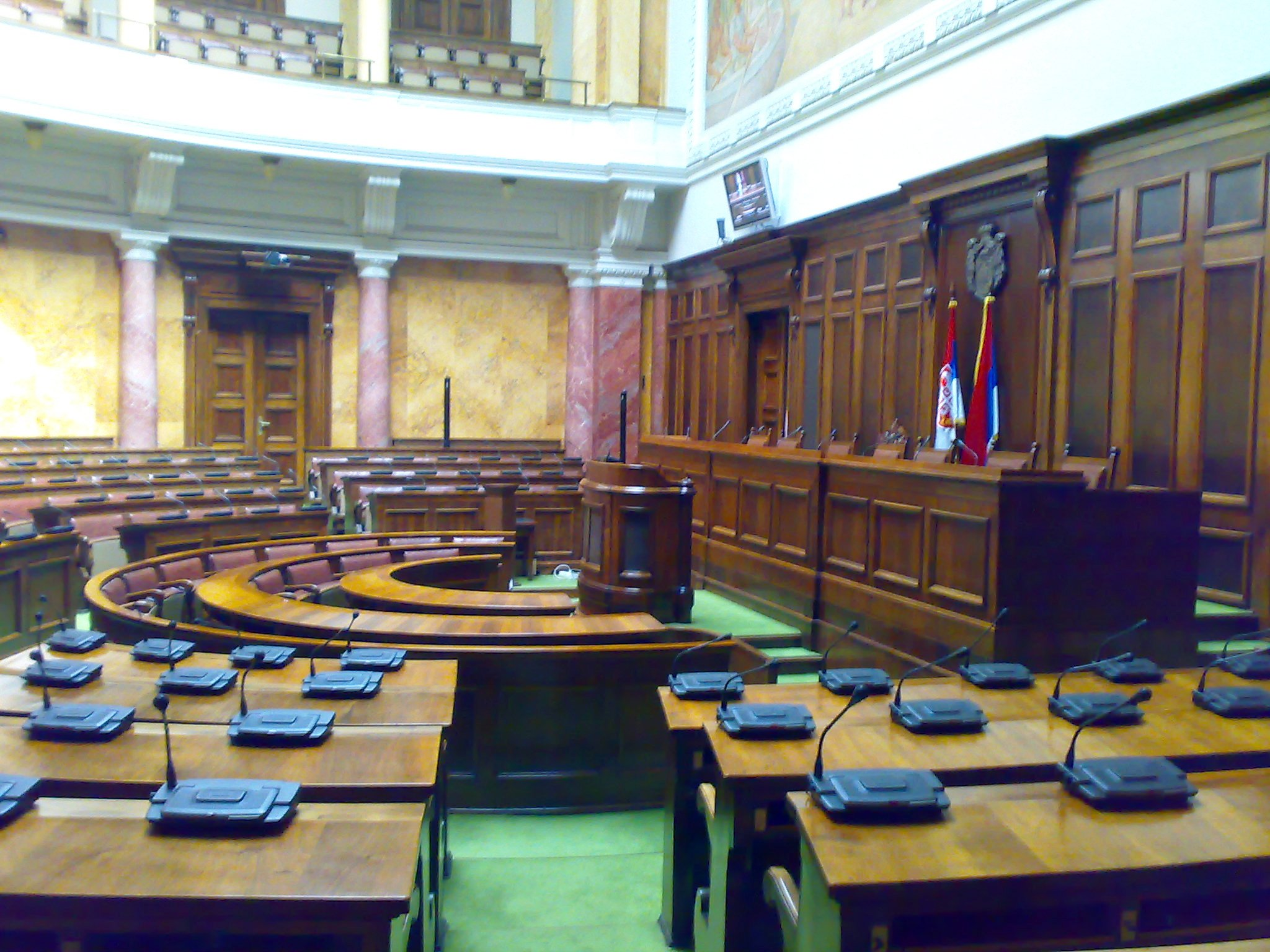
The Small Chamber

The Rules of Procedure govern the organisation and work of the Assembly and the exercise of deputies' rights and duties.

The first sitting of a newly elected Assembly is chaired by its oldest deputy, a role similar to that of the Father of the House in other parliaments, assisted by the youngest deputy from each of the four lists that won the most seats and by the outgoing Secretary-General. At this sitting, the President of the National Assembly, the vice-presidents and the members of the committees are elected, and the Secretary-General is appointed.

The Assembly meets in two regular sessions each year, beginning on the first working days of March and October. It may be convened in extraordinary session, with a set agenda, at the request of at least one-third of the deputies or of the Government, and it convenes without notice upon the declaration of a state of war or emergency. The agenda is proposed by the President of the National Assembly. A quorum requires the presence of one-third of the deputies, or at least 126 deputies on voting days. Decisions are taken by a majority of the deputies present, who may vote for, vote against, or abstain.

Laws and other acts may be proposed by any deputy, by the Government, by the assemblies of the autonomous provinces, or by at least 30,000 voters. The Ombudsman and the Governor of the National Bank of Serbia may also propose laws within their competence. At the request of a majority of all deputies or of at least 100,000 voters, the Assembly may call a referendum on matters within its competence.

The President of the Republic may dissolve the Assembly on a reasoned proposal from the Government, but the Government may not make such a proposal while a motion for its own dismissal is pending. The Assembly is also dissolved if it fails to elect a Government within 90 days of being constituted. It may not be dissolved during a state of war or emergency. A dissolved Assembly performs only current or urgent tasks; if a state of war or emergency is declared, its full powers are restored until the state of war or emergency ends.

== House of the National Assembly ==
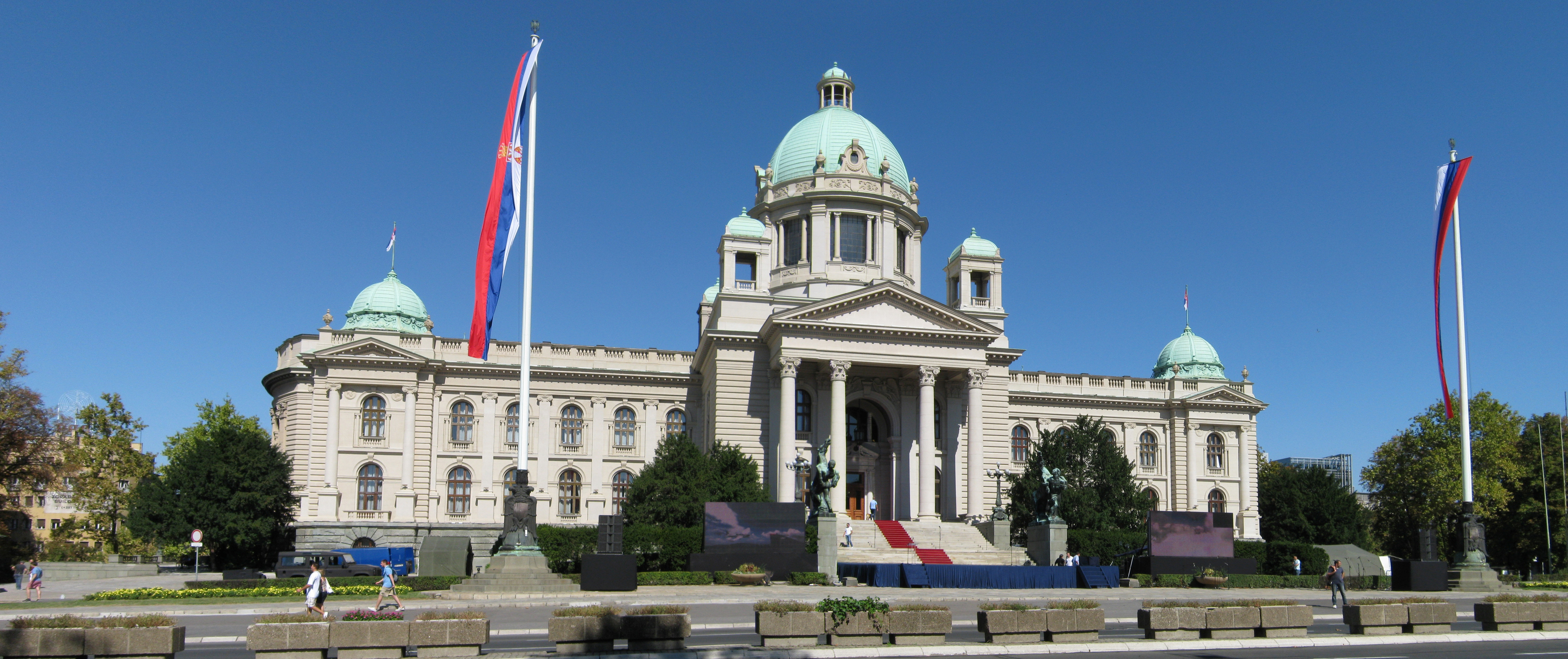
Main façade of the House of the National Assembly

The National Assembly meets in the House of the National Assembly on Nikola Pašić Square in Belgrade. Originally built for the National Assembly of the Kingdom of Serbia, it later housed the Assembly of Yugoslavia and the Assembly of Serbia and Montenegro.

The neo-Baroque building covers about 13,400 m^{2} (144,000 sq ft) and includes some 100 offices, two chambers, four conference rooms and a central vestibule beneath a dome. The 165-square-metre (1,780 sq ft) library on the first floor holds more than 60,000 books.

== See also ==
- Elections in Serbia
- Politics of Serbia

== Sources ==
- Rastović, A.; Roter Blagojević, M.; Borozan, I. (2022). Народна скупштина: огледало воље народа Србије [National Assembly: Mirroring the Will of the Serbian People]. Novi Sad–Belgrade. ISBN 978-86-81648-50-6.
- Mitrinović, Čedomil; Brašić, Miloš N. (1937). Југословенске народне скупштине и сабори [Yugoslav national assemblies and diets] (in Serbian). Izd. Narodne skupštine.
- Jelavich, Charles; Jelavich, Barbara (2000) [1977]. The Establishment of the Balkan National States, 1804–1920. Vol. 8 (4th ed.). Seattle: University of Washington Press. ISBN 978-0-29580-360-9.
- National Assembly of Serbia (December 2010). "Информатор о раду" [Information booklet] (PDF) (in Serbian). National Assembly of Serbia. (This text is in the public domain as official material of a Serbian state body, under Article 6, Paragraph 2 of Serbian copyright law.)
- "Историјат и културна баштина Народне скупштине" [History and cultural heritage of the National Assembly] (PDF) (in Serbian). National Assembly of Serbia.
