= Statute of Vojvodina =

Statute of Vojvodina Статут Војводине

Assembly of Vojvodina (with the assent of the National Assembly)
- Long title: Statute of the Autonomous Province of Vojvodina
- Territorial extent: Vojvodina
- Enacted by: Assembly of Vojvodina (with the assent of the National Assembly)
- Enacted: 2014

Related legislation
- Constitution of Serbia
- Status: In force

The current Statute of the Autonomous Province of Vojvodina (Serbian: Статут Аутономне Покрајине Војводине, romanized: Statut Autonomne Pokrajine Vojvodine), enacted in its present form in 2014, is the supreme legal document outlining the principles of governing Vojvodina within the framework of the Constitution of Serbia and national laws. Statute, adopted by the Assembly of Vojvodina with the assent of the National Assembly of Serbia, delineates scope of the autonomy of the province, with specific provisions related to various aspects of it. Vojvodina has experienced varying degrees of autonomy over the years, influenced by geopolitical shifts and historical events.

== History ==
In early Middle Ages, Serbs settled in the southern parts of the Kingdom of Hungary (Syrmia, Bačka, Banat, Baranya), with their population increasing with the Great Migrations of the Serbs in the 17th and 18th centuries. Serbs called for various autonomous territorial and cultural rights on multiple occasions, including at the 1790 Council of Timisoara, 1848 May Assembly, and 1861 Annunciation Council. Austrian Empire and Austria-Hungary nevertheless limited Serb autonomy to Eastern Orthodox religious and educational self-government, particularly after the abolition of the Serbian Vojvodina in 1849 and Voivodeship of Serbia and Banat of Temeschwar in 1860. Calls for Serb territorial autonomy were silenced until the beginning of the World War I and the end of the Austria-Hungary. The experience and subsequent abolition of Serbian Vojvodina and Voivodeship of Serbia and Banat of Temeschwar nevertheless inspired cultural and political leaders among Prečani Serbs for advocating for unification or closer links with the Principality of Serbia and Kingdom of Serbia.

In 1918, the Great National Assembly of Serbs, Bunjevci, and other Slavs proclaimed unification of the Banat, Bačka and Baranja with the Kingdom of Serbia soon leading to the creation of the Kingdom of Serbs, Croats, and Slovenes (Yugoslavia). The unification was perceived as a realization of major political objectives of the Serbs in Vojvodina limiting most of the further claims for autonomy in the interwar period and with Novi Sad serving as a seat of the Danube Banovina. Only handful political and cultural leaders, such as Vasa Stajić, advocated for preservation of Vojvodina's distinctiveness within the new state.

During the World War II in Yugoslavia, the Anti-Fascist Council for the National Liberation of Yugoslavia established the Main National Liberation Committee for Vojvodina which in turn confirmed the union with the People's Republic of Serbia within the Federal People's Republic of Yugoslavia.

Presidium of the People's Republic of Serbia introduced the Law on the Organization of the Autonomous Province of Vojvodina in 1945. In 1948, the Socialist Autonomous Province of Vojvodina, with the assent from the Socialist Republic of Serbia, introduced its first statute defining Vojvodina as an autonomous province within Serbia and reaffirming the right for the Presidium of Serbia to scrap unconstitutional or unlawful provincial decisions. Following the Tito–Stalin split and the introduction of the principles of the socialist self-management, Vojvodina adopted its new statute in 1953, this time independently and without assent from Serbian authorities, preventing the right of Serbia from scraping provincial decisions.

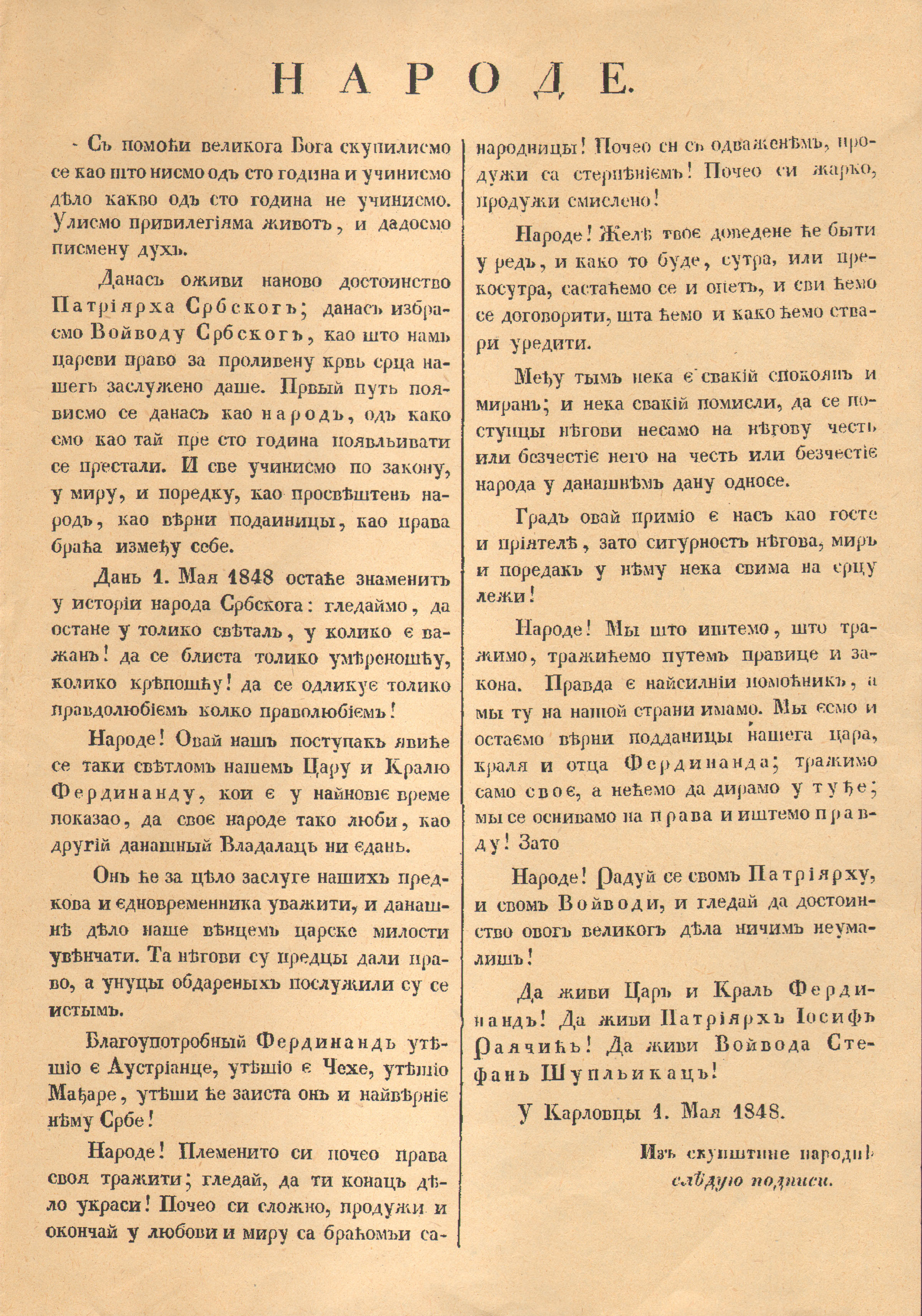
May Assembly Proclamation, 1848

The third statute was adopted in 1963, expanding provincial autonomy, elevating the administrative status of Novi Sad, and introducing the Supreme Court of Vojvodina as a branch of the Supreme Court of Serbia. Vojvodina expanded its autonomy once again in 1969 by introducing the Constitutional Act of Vojvodina that alongside the Constitution of Serbia was now directly subordinated to the federal Yugoslav Constitution. The term ethnic minorities was changed to ethnic communities (narodnosti) while Novi Sad gained the status of the capital city of Vojvodina.

The Socialist Autonomous Province of Vojvodina adopted the Constitution of Vojvodina in 1974 following the adoption of 1974 Yugoslav Constitution. The document with the long preamble and 430 articles provided almost all of the elements consumed up until that time only by Yugoslav constituent republics, introducing the Constitutional Court of Vojvodina, and redefining the relations with the Socialist Republic of Serbia on the basis of common interest and provisions of republican and provincial constitutions. The 1974 Constitution of Vojvodina represented the peak of the decentralization within Serbia while the late 1980s anti-bureaucratic revolution, initiated by Slobodan Milošević, made the sharp turn in the direction of the renewed centralization embodied in numerous constitutional amendments reaffirming and strengthening the link of the province with Serbia. The motivation for the change was the widespread perception among the Serbian political elite that such high level of provincial autonomy put Serbia in unequal position compared to other Yugoslav constituent republics. Following the 1990 Serbian constitutional referendum, Serbia adopted a new constitution which led to the promulgation of the new provincial statute in 1991, as a by-law, this time with the assent of the National Assembly of Serbia. This statute stripped provincial bodies of any original or delegated powers and competencies.

Following the overthrow of Slobodan Milošević in 2000, the new government, led by Zoran Đinđić, introduced the so-called Omnibus Law in 2002 which strengthened certain provincial competencies.

Following the restoration of Serbia's independence in 2006, after dissolution of Serbia and Montenegro, the new provincial statute was adopted in 2008. The statute, in Article 185, defines itself as the highest legal act of the province while in Article 194 states that its provisions must be in accordance with the Constitution of Serbia. The Constitutional Court of Serbia is entitled to rule on conformity of the statute and other provincial acts with the constitution and national laws. The statute reaffirmed the autonomy but focused it primarily on executive power without any substantive legislative and judicial jurisdiction. In 2009, however, the Law on the Competencies of the Autonomus Province of Vojvodina was adopted by the National Assembly of Serbia, expanding the scope of competencies of the provincial authorities as well as introducing some terminology ambiguities (such as definition of Novi Sad as a capital). That same year the Democratic Party of Serbia brought the statute before the Constitutional Court of Serbia arguing that law provisions are too broad and unconstitutional. The court remained silent on the issue for the following three years publishing its decision only in 2012, when a number of provisions were declared unconstitutional, including on the capital city status of Novi Sad and provisions on independent cross-border cooperation of Vojvodina with other regions and European Union. The decision of the Constitutional Court resulted in amendments to the statute which now defined Novi Sad as a administrative centre and the seat of provincial bodies while the Government of Vojvodina was renamed into the Provincial Government of Vojvodina.

== Content ==
Among the statute's articles are guarantees of human rights, minority rights, the use of the languages and alphabets of ethnic minorities: in official use is Serbian and Cyrillic script as well as minority languages (Hungarian, Slovak, Romanian, Croatian, and Rusyn) and their respective alphabets.

Article 1 states:

Vojvodina is an autonomous province of the citizens who live in it, within the Republic of Serbia.

Vojvodina is a region in which traditional multiculturalism is preserved, and other European principles and values.

AP Vojvodina is an inseparable part of Serbia.

Article 6 states:

In Vojvodina, the Serbs, Hungarians, Slovaks, Croats, Montenegrins, Romanians, Roma, Bunjevci, Rusyns, and Macedonians, as well as other numerically smaller ethnic communities that live in it, are equal in exercising their rights.

== See also ==
- Politics of Vojvodina
- Vojvodina Autonomist Movement
- Administrative divisions of Serbia
