= Church of Sts. Peter and Paul, Berkasovo =

Church of Sts. Peter and Paul
- Црква Светих Петра и Павла
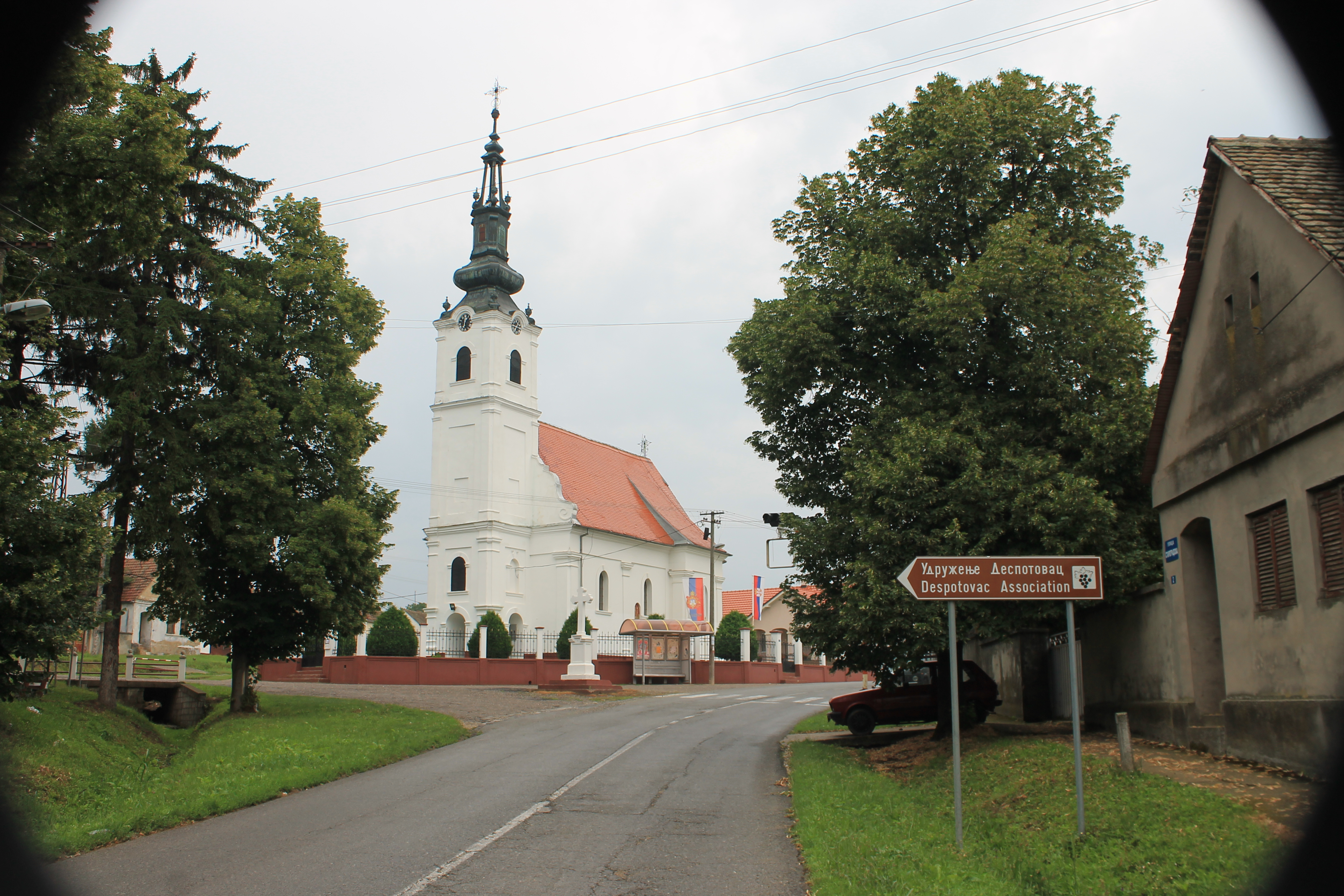
- Church of Sts. Peter and Paul
- Church of Sts. Peter and Paul
- 45°09′01″N 19°15′50″E
- Location: Vojvodina, Berkasovo

Cultural Heritage of Serbia
- Type: Cultural Monument of Great Importance
- Designated: 30 December 1997
- Reference no.: СК 1348
- Country: Serbia
- Denomination: Serbian Orthodox

History
- Dedication: Saint Peter and Paul the Apostle
- Consecrated: 1766-1778

Architecture
- Style: Baroque and Classicism

Administration
- Archdiocese: Eparchy of Srem

The Church of Sts. Peter and Paul (Црква светих Петра и Павла) in Berkasovo is a Serbian Orthodox church in Vojvodina, Serbia. The church is dedicated to Saint Peter and Paul the Apostle.

The church is listed as a protected cultural heritage. It was originally protected by the Socialist Autonomous Province of Vojvodina on 19 December 1972 and it received state level protection on 30 December 1997. The creation of the icons was entrusted to Pavle Čortanović in 1862 while the iconostasis of the Virgin Mary and the Metropolitan throne were adorned with icons by Svetozar Popovic in 1910. Conservation works on the building were carried out in 1982.

== See also ==
- Eparchy of Srem
- Šid
- Berkasovo Monastery
