= State Attorney's Office (Serbia) =

- Државно правобранилавштво

Office overview
- Formed: 1842 (current form since 2014)
- Preceding agencies: State Financial Manager (1842–1843); State Attorney (1843–1934); State Attorney's Office (1934–1945); Public Attorney's Office (1945–2014)
- Type: Directorate
- Jurisdiction: Serbia
- Headquarters: Kosovska 31, Belgrade
- Office executive: Olivera Stanimirović, State Attorney
- Parent Office: Ministry of Justice
- Website: dpb.gov.rs

The State Attorney's Office (Serbian: Државно правобранилавштво, romanized: Državno pravobranilavštvo) is directorate of the Ministry of Justice of Serbia which performs legal protection of property rights and interests of the Republic of Serbia, through the legal counseling of the state authorities in civil law matters and their representation before the courts.

In Serbia, distinction should be made between the State Attorney's Office, which is a body within the Ministry of Justice and as such part of the executive branch, and the Public Prosecutor Office which is an independent judicial body charged to instigate prosecution of perpetrators of criminal offences. The State Attorney's Office of Serbia performs functions similar to the Solicitor General Office in Spain, State Attorney Office in Italy, Judicial State Officer in France, and, to limited degree, some of the competencies of the Attorney General in common law countries.

== History ==
The institution of a state attorney's office has a long tradition in Serbia. Since 1842, in the Principality of Serbia, the State Financial Manager (Serbian: Правитељствени фишкал) was established as a state body with the competences to perform the duty of a state attorney. It was abolished only after a year, and the function of a state attorney's office was sent back within the competences of the Ministry of Finance. However, within the ministry, the function of the state attorney's office was performed by particular employees – State Attorney (Serbian: Правитељствени правобранитељ / Државни правобранитељ) and existed until 1934, when the State Attorney's Office Act was passed. By this Law, for the first time, the functions and organization of the State Attorney's Office as a state body within the Ministry of Finance, was established. After World War II, the office was renamed name to Public Attorney's Office, without essential change of competencies. In 2014, with promulgation of the State Attorney's Office Act, the office was renamed back to the State Attorney's Office.

== Missions ==
The State Attorney's Office represents the state authorities before the courts, and advises the government in civil law matters.

The jurisdiction of the State Attorney's Office include:

- undertaking legal measures and instruments before the courts in order to protect rights and interests of the Republic of Serbia and state bodies in private law matters, and acting as their legal representative;
- representing other legal persons regarding their rights and interests in private law matters, in cases that their interests are not in contradiction with its missions;
- initiating review of constitutionality and legality of laws, regulations, and general acts, before the Constitutional Court, in case the interests of the state is being jeopardized.
- providing legal opinions and advices on contracts and other private law matters, within 30 days, starting from the moment of the delivery of a request from the state body/authority.

== Organization ==
The State Attorney's Office is headed by the State Attorney (Serbian: Државни правобранилац, romanized: Državni pravobranilac), who is appointed by the Government for the period of four years and can be reappointed. The State Attorney has 25 deputies, which are also appointed by the Government. The State Attorney is responsible for his/her work and the work of the State Attorney's Office to the Government, while the deputies are responsible to the State Attorney.

The State Attorney's Office is organized in the headquarters in Belgrade and eleven departments:

- Department in Kraljevo – for Raška, Rasina, and Moravica administrative districts;
- Department in Kragujevac – for Šumadija and Pomoravlje administrative districts;
- Department in Leskovac – for Jablanica and Pčinja administrative districts;
- Department in Niš – for Nišava, Pirot, and Toplica administrative districts;
- Department in Novi Sad – for South Bačka and Srem administrative districts;
- Department in Požarevac – for Braničevo and Podunavlje administrative districts;
- Department in Subotica – for North Bačka and West Bačka administrative districts;
- Department in Užice – for Zlatibor administrative district.
- Department in Valjevo – for Kolubara and Mačva administrative districts;
- Department in Zaječar – for Bor and Zaječar administrative districts;
- Department in Zrenjanin – for Central Banat, South Banat, and North Banat administrative districts;

== State Attorneys ==
The following is a list of the State Attorneys since the re-establishment of the State Attorney's Office in 2014:

No.	Portrait	Name	Took office	Left office
1		Snježana Prodanović	5 September 2014	10 September 2015
2		Olivera Stanimirović	11 September 2015	Incumbent

== See also ==
- Ministry of Justice of Serbia
- Judiciary of Serbia
