= Petar Relić (Yugoslav politician) =

Yugoslav partisan and politician

Petar Relić (Serbian Cyrillic: Петар Релић; 26 June 1913 – 8 June 1990), nicknamed Čeda (Serbian Cyrillic: Чеда), was a Yugoslav partisan fighter and politician. He participated in the liberation of Yugoslavia from the Axis powers and afterwards awarded the Order of the People's Hero.

He held high political office in the Socialist Federal Republic of Yugoslavia, the Socialist Republic of Serbia, and the Socialist Autonomous Province of Vojvodina, serving for a time as president of the province's executive council (i.e., effectively as its prime minister).
