= Berkasovo Monastery =

- Манастир Беркасово
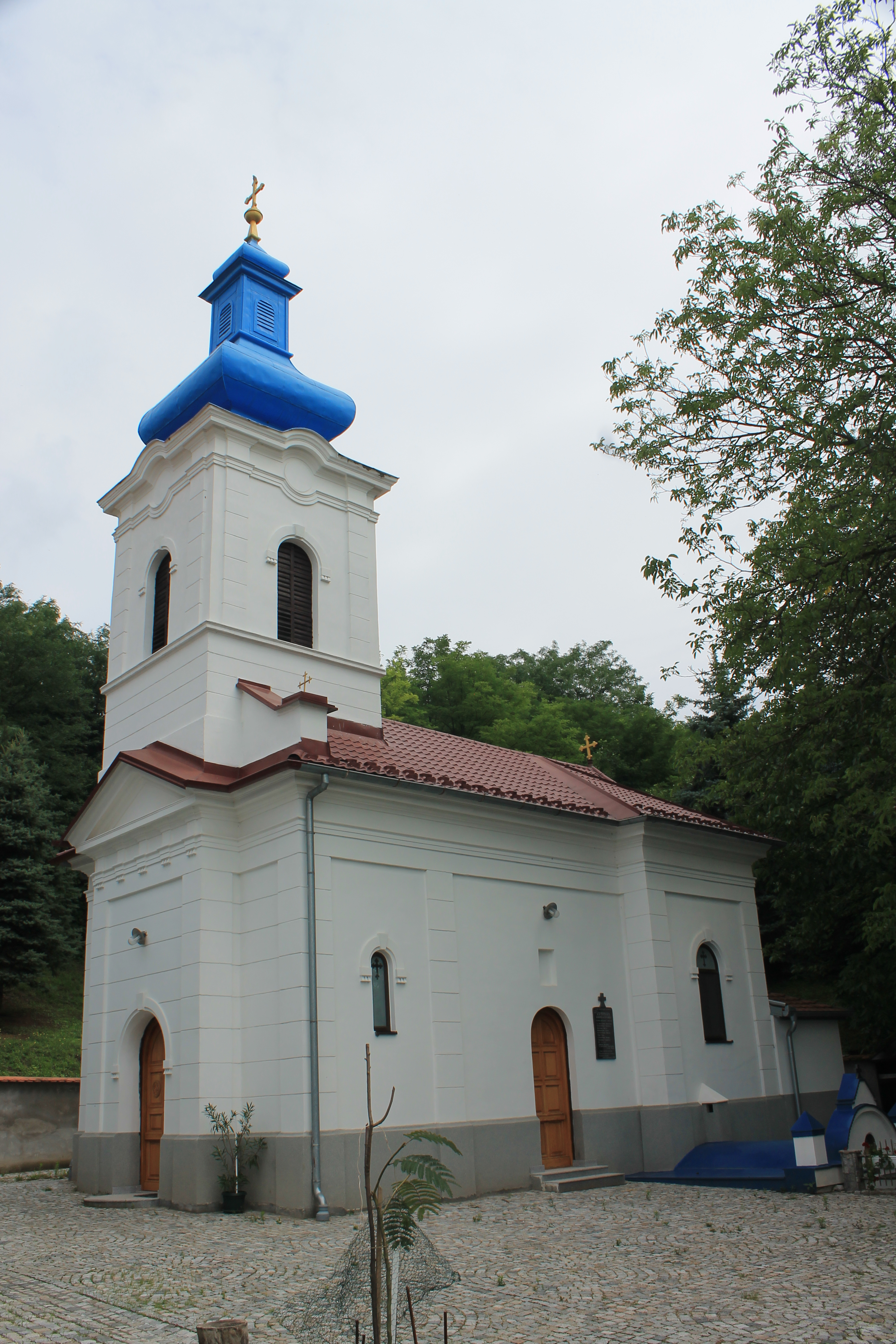
- Berkasovo Monastery
- 45°10′06″N 19°15′52″E
- Denomination: Serbian Orthodox

History
- Dedication: Paraskeva of the Balkans

The Berkasovo Monastery (Serbian: Манастир Беркасово) is a Serbian Orthodox Monastery of Diocese of Srem. It is located near the village Berkasovo, in the municipality of Sid, Serbia.

== History and location ==
Near Berkasovo, two kilometers northwest, as part of the monumental complex of the parish church, there is the Church of St. Paraskeva - St. Petka, located in a beautiful bay on the stretch Ashman, surrounded by forest and vineyards. Beneath the very foundation, on the east side of the church, there is an arranged spring, whose water is considered by the people to be healing and miraculous.

The monastery in Berkasovo, a village in the municipality of Sid, dedicated to Saint Petka Trnovska, is the westernmost monastery in Fruska Gora. The Church of St. Petka was declared a monastery on August 8, 2008, on the day of church glory the monastery is a woman.

Today's Church of St. Petka was founded in the second half of the 19th century. In the circle of the monastery there is a "healing" spring, near which a wooden church, vodica, was built in due time. According to a written source from 1863, people from various parts gathered around the log cabin, which later burned down. The carved inscription on the marble slab, which originates from a certain citizen of Dubrovnik cured of a serious illness, is one of several inscriptions of gratitude that testifies to the healing properties of this water. The fortified town of Berkasovo was in the possession of Vuk Grgurević, and later the despot Jovan Branković (1496), one of the founders of the nearby Privina head.

== See also ==
- Church of St. Peter and Paul, Berkasovo

== Images ==
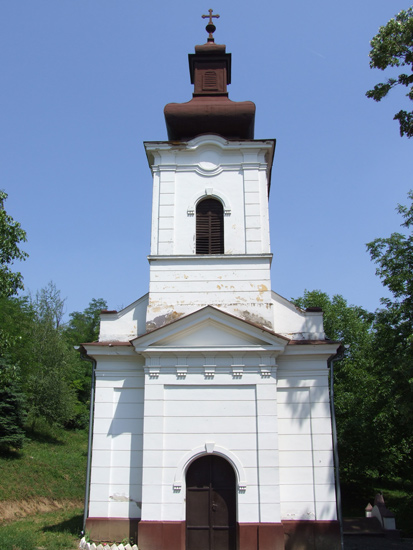

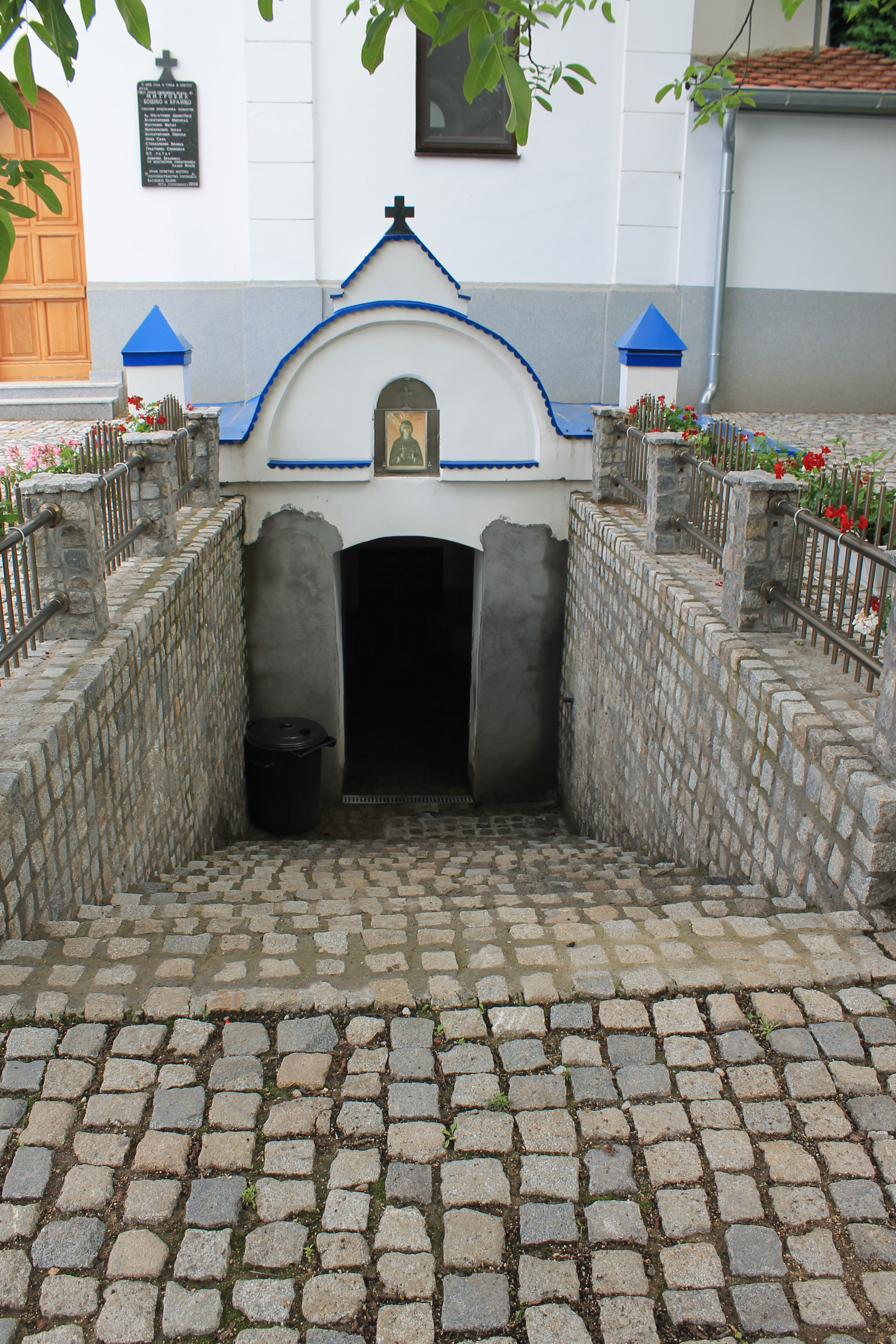

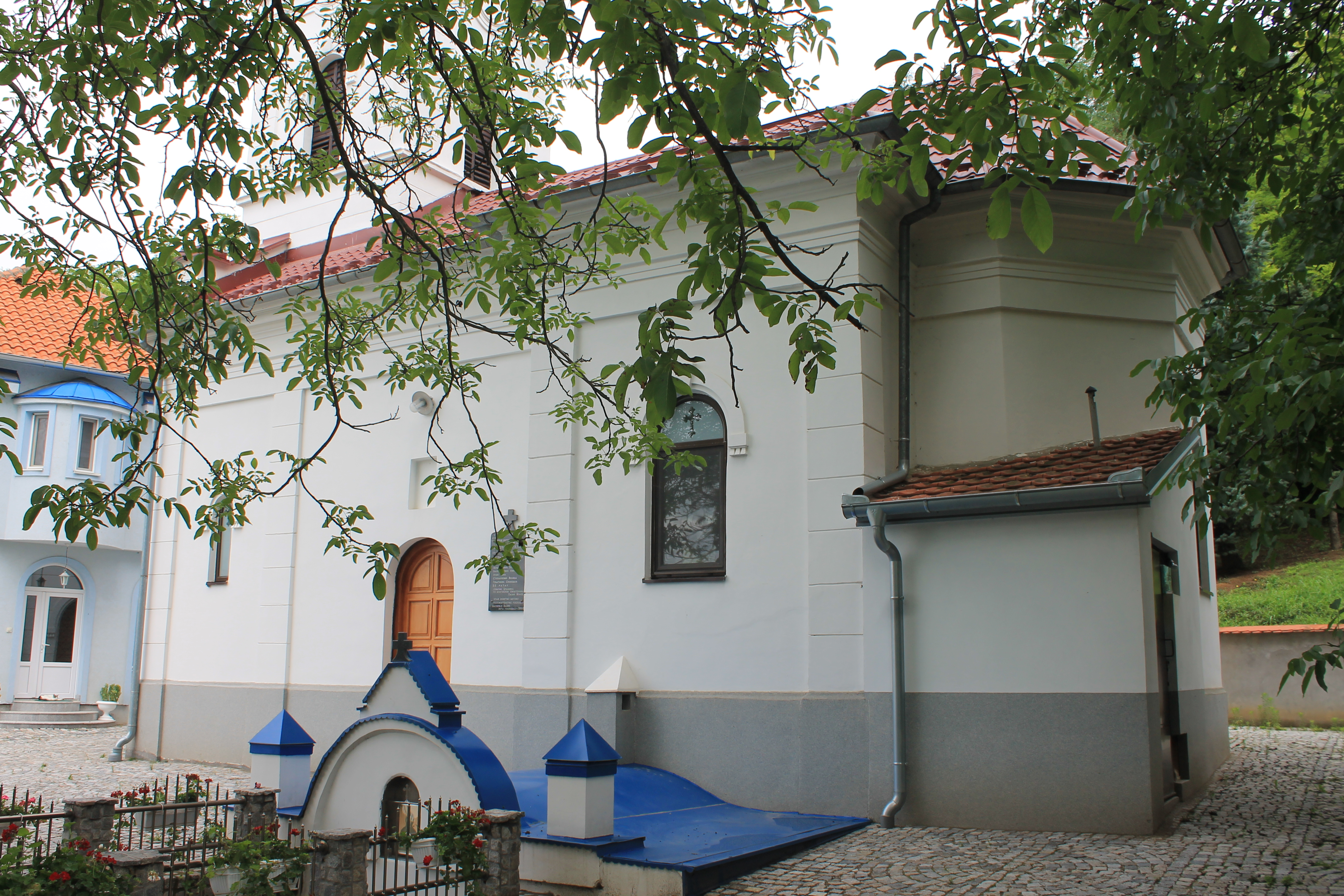

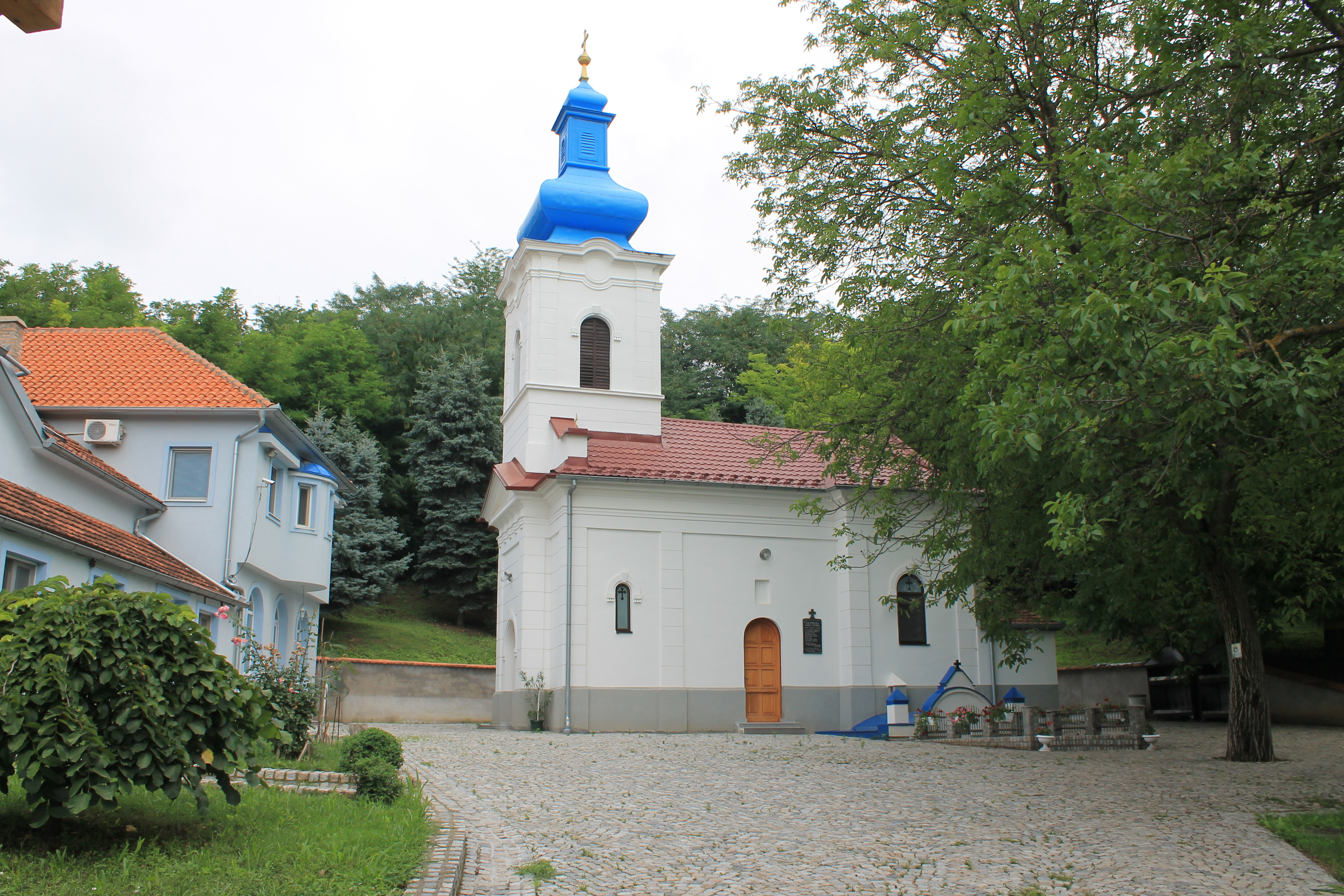

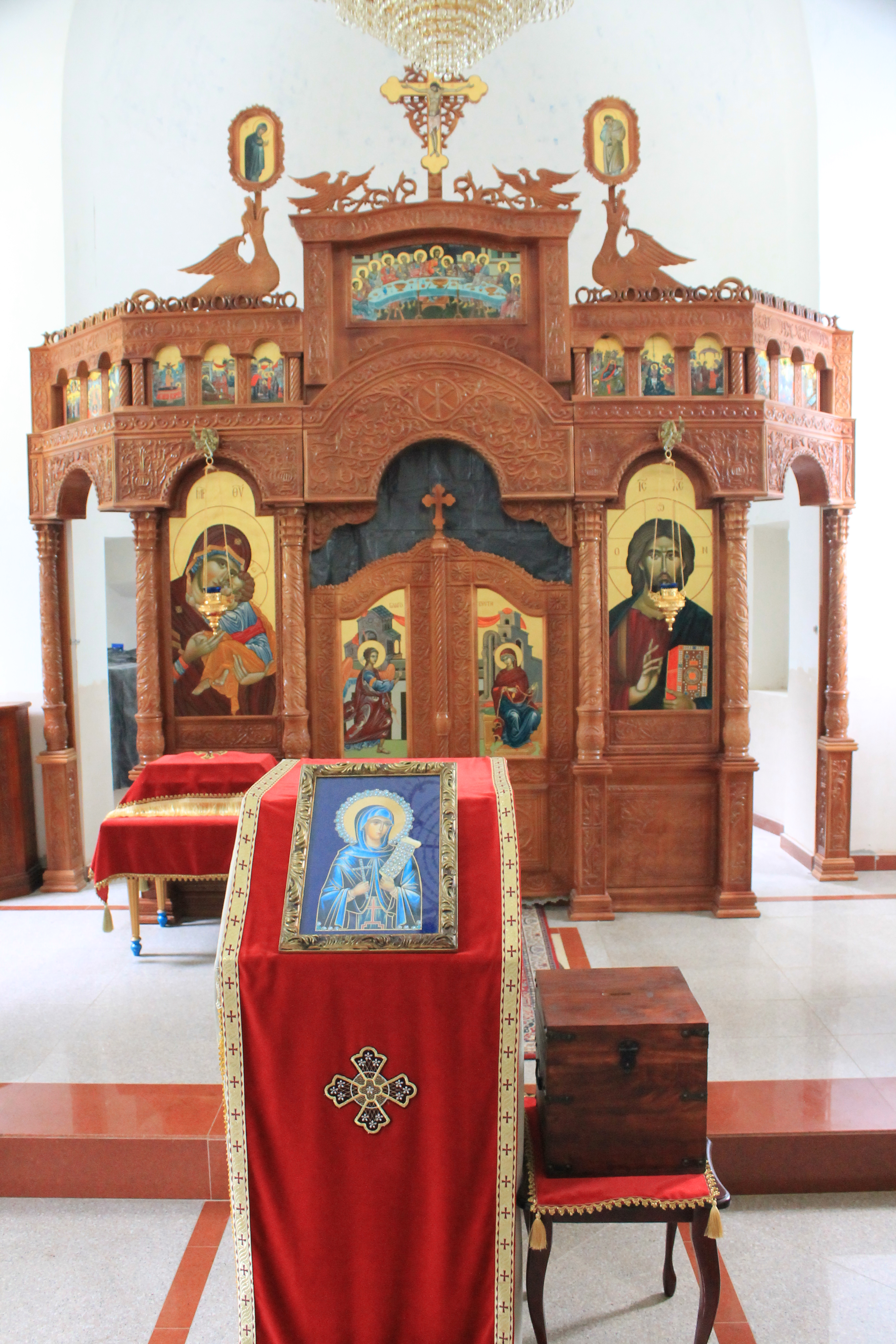
