= 1990 Serbian constitutional referendum =

- 1–2 July 1990
- Should the constitution be adopted first, and then multi-party elections called, or vice versa?

Results
Choice	Votes	%
Yes	5,162,320	97.34%
No	141,137	2.66%
Valid votes	5,303,457	99.48%
Invalid or blank votes	27,505	0.52%
Total votes	5,330,962	100.00%
Registered voters/turnout	6,813,790	78.24%

A constitutional referendum was held in Serbia on 1 and 2 July 1990, in which voters decided on approving a new constitution. The referendum was announced by Slobodan Milošević, the president of the presidency of SR Serbia, on 25 June. The proposed changes included the abolition of autonomies of Kosovo and Vojvodina, the implementation of a multi-party system, and the establishing of the office of the president of Serbia, which would have extensive powers. With a voter turnout of 78%, the new constitution was approved by 97% of voters. The Assembly proclaimed the new constitution on 28 September.

Milošević and the League of Communists of Serbia were initially opposed to introducing a multi-party system and holding free elections. However, the newly formed opposition parties—the Democratic Party and the Serbian Renewal Movement—advocated for a dialogue with the government to consider implementing political reforms. The Presidency of Serbia then proposed amendments, which was followed by an opposition protest in Belgrade on 13 June. Milošević declined to work with the opposition after the protest and called for a referendum to oppose the confederalism of Yugoslavia.

The opposition parties opposed holding the referendum before the multi-party elections and called for a boycott. The state media labelled those opposed to the referendum as "anti-Serbian" and "pro-Albanian". Following the referendum, the Kosovo Assembly was dissolved due to the proclamation of Republic of Kosova; the dissolution was condemned by Amnesty International and the European Parliament. General elections were held in December 1990, in which Milošević's Socialist Party of Serbia obtained a supermajority despite winning less than 50% of the popular vote.

== Background ==
Slobodan Milošević came to power in SR Serbia at the 8th session in September 1987. Milošević served as the president of the City Committee of League of Communists of Serbia (SKS) in Belgrade until being appointed president of SKS in May 1986, upon the proposal of his mentor Ivan Stambolić—a reformist within the SKS. Milošević turned populist in April 1987 and then became a critic of Stambolić. Milošević dismissed Stambolić's allies at the 8th Session, and in December 1987, Stambolić was removed from his role as president of Serbia. With Milošević in power, the anti-bureaucratic revolution, launched in support of Milošević's policies, overthrew the leadership in Montenegro, Vojvodina, and Kosovo in favour of the pro-Milošević faction. Milošević later became the president of the presidency of the Socialist Republic of Serbia in May 1989.

In January 1990, a League of Communists of Yugoslavia (SKJ) extraordinary congress was held to address the dispute over Milošević's centralisation reforms and reforms of the Federal Assembly of Yugoslavia. During the congress, the SKS proposed implementing a "one man–one vote" system, which was opposed by the Slovene delegation, who favoured confederated Yugoslavia. Milošević was fiercely opposed to confederalism. With the assistance of delegates from Montenegro, Vojvodina, Kosovo, and the Yugoslav People's Army, the proposals from SKS were accepted, while the Slovene and Bosnian proposals were rejected. This ultimately led to the dissolution of SKJ shortly after the congress.

With the dissolution of SKJ, constituent republics of Yugoslavia such as Slovenia and Croatia held their first multi-party elections, paving the way for a transition to liberal democracy. Milošević was opposed to a multi-party system and free elections, while the SKS advocated for the formation of associations within the Socialist Alliance of Working People (SSRNS). Opposition parties in Serbia began to form in late 1989 and early 1990. These included parties like the Democratic Party (DS), Serbian National Renewal (SNO), and Serbian Renewal Movement (SPO).

== Reforms and protests ==
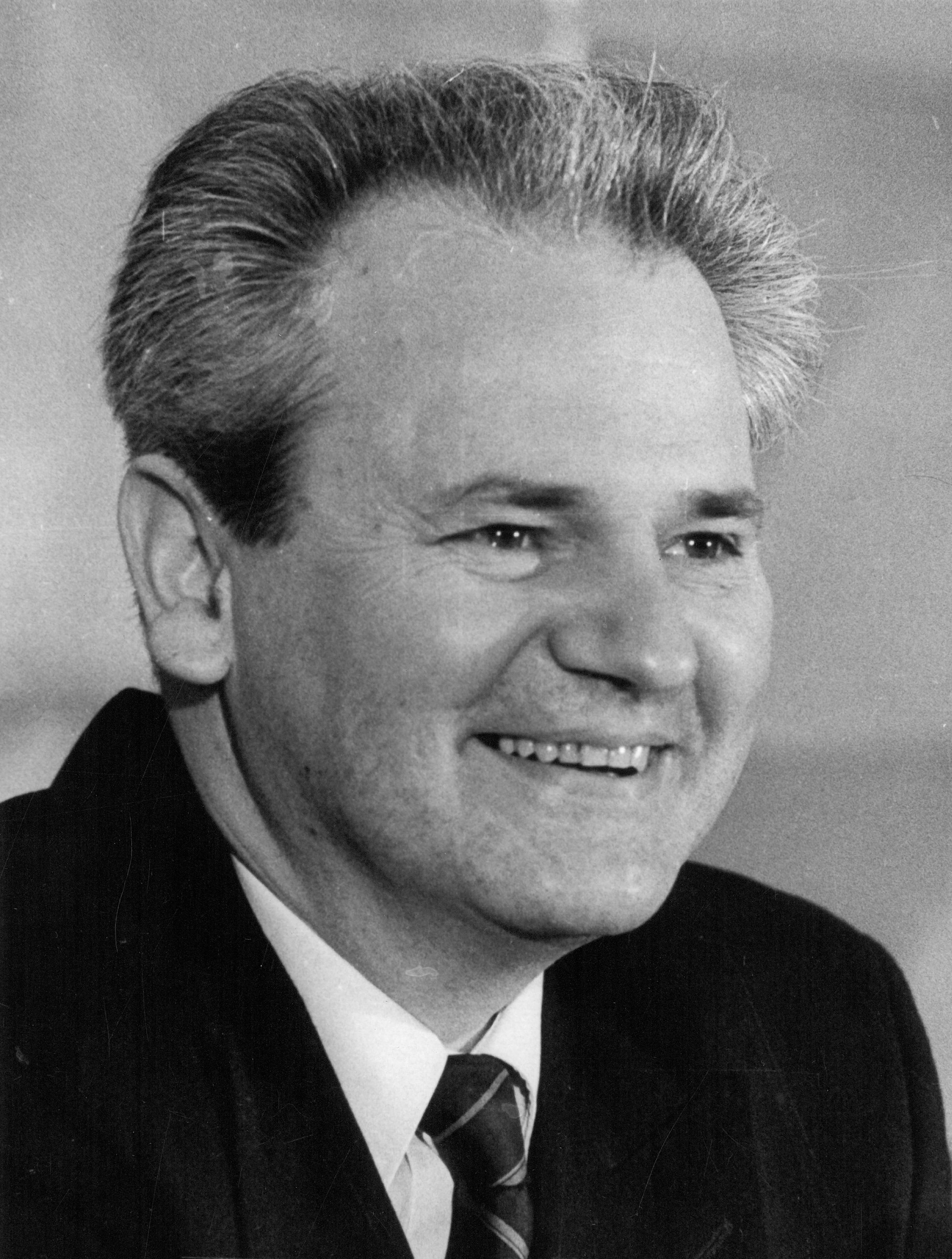
Slobodan Milošević announced on 25 June that a new constitution should be adopted.

Shortly after the formation of SNO in January 1990, Milošević wanted to detain their official, Vuk Drašković, who later became the president of SPO, due to unnamed "legal reasons" (pravni razlozi). Politika also published an article accusing Drašković of being anti-democratic and that he wants to "bring back the time of darkness and hatred" (on želi da vrati vreme mraka i mržnje). Borisav Jović, who served as the Serbian representative in the Yugoslav Presidency, sought to ban all newly-formed political parties, claiming that they are "nationalist and separatist" (nacionalističke i separatističke).

In March 1990, the Central Committee of SKS contemplated holding multi-party elections in Serbia, but no decision was made. Milošević remained dubious of the multi-party system, accusing opposition parties of fostering revanchism and inciting a civil war during an event in Pančevo in May 1990. The government of Serbia then prohibited an SPO gathering at Ravna Gora on 13 May. In late May, opposition parties signed a document in which they requested a roundtable between the opposition and the government to discuss multi-party elections and new election laws. The Presidency of Serbia later submitted amendments to the constitution on 6 June, with the Executive Committee of Assembly of SR Serbia describing them as "a good basis for the construction of Serbia as a modern, unified, democratic, and efficient legal state" (dobra osnova za izgradnju Srbije kao moderne, jedinstvene, demokratske i efikasne pravne države). A day later, it was announced that SKS and SSRNS would merge to create the Socialist Party of Serbia (SPS).

The government also responded at their request, and a roundtable was organised on 8 June. At the roundtable, the opposition and the government could not decide whether to first adopt a new constitution or organise new elections; the government wanted to adopt a new constitution first. The Constitutional Commission of the Assembly of SR Serbia then said that multi-party elections could not be held in accordance with the constitutions of Serbia and Yugoslavia, and announced that a draft constitution would be published in July and proclaimed in December 1990.

Opposition parties, such as DS and SPO, organised the first anti-government protest since the conclusion of World War II on 13 June 1990, under the banner of the United Opposition of Serbia (UOS). The protest, which took place in Belgrade, drew between 30,000 and 40,000 people. UOS demanded that free elections be held in 1990 and petitioned the Assembly to consider implementing a multi-party system. Radio Television of Belgrade (RTB) covered the protest negatively and the government labelled the protest as "anti-Serbian". The police intervened in front of the building of RTB, where demonstrators, including DS president Dragoljub Mićunović and member Borislav Pekić, were beaten up by the police. Politika wrote, "When their behaviour became disruptive, the police intervened" (kada je njihovo ponašanja postalo rušilačko, intervenisala je policija). According to the police, four cars were damaged during the protests, while according to the opposition, seven demonstrators were arrested.

Milošević refused to work with the opposition following the 13 June protest. He then suddenly proposed in the Assembly on 25 June that a new constitution be proclaimed. "Adoption of a new constitution, among other things, should prevent every attempt to quietly transform federal Yugoslavia into a confederation", Milošević said in the Assembly. He also argued that the constitutional referendum should be held before the first multi-party elections in Serbia to avoid Kosovo Albanians gaining representation in the Assembly.

After the announcement, an opposition protest was organised in front of RTB, where Vojislav Šešelj gave a speech critical of the government. Opposition parties wanted the referendum postponed until after the first multiparty elections, urging a boycott if their demands were not met. The state media labelled those opposed to the referendum as "anti-Serbian" and "pro-Albanian". Kosta Čavoški of DS later said that "Milošević and his party deliberately stirred up fears that the territorial integrity of Serbia was under threat and that only their constitutional project will be able to eliminate the permanent threat that Kosovo and Metohija would secede from Serbia. Such deceitful propaganda seduced many citizens of Serbia who went to vote in the referendum".

== Conduct ==
The Republic Electoral Commission (RIK) oversaw the referendum in accordance with the Law on Referendum that was adopted by the Assembly in 1989. The Assembly announced on 25 June that the referendum would take place on 1 and 2 July. On 1 July, voting stations were open from 07:00 (UTC+01:00) until 22:00, while on 2 July they were open until 19:00. Outside of Serbia, six voting stations were available in Montenegro, allowing citizens on vacation to vote in the referendum. Voting also took place at military establishments. Voting was secret, and voters could only circle one of two options: "for" (za) or "against" (protiv). For the referendum to be recognised as valid, at least half of all registered voters had to participate in the referendum.

The question on the ballot paper was posed as "Should the Constitution be adopted first, and then multi-party elections called, or vice versa?" (Da li prvo doneti ustav pa raspisati višestranačke izbore ili obratno?). As reported by Zoran Sokolović, the president of the Assembly of SR Serbia, in the Official Gazette, the proposal to hold the referendum was recommended by the presidency of SR Serbia and members of the Assembly of SR Serbia. The referendum was held amidst a crisis in Kosovo, with Kosovo Albanians boycotting the referendum. The referendum was effectively a vote on the Kosovo issue. The Los Angeles Times said that the referendum was "called by the republic's ruling Communists, who are attempting to retain power by exploiting rising Serbian anger over ethnic Albanian separatism in Kosovo province".

== Proposed changes ==
The proposed constitution would remove the "Socialist" prefix from the state's name and effectively eliminate SAP Kosovo and SAP Vojvodina's autonomy by abolishing their parliaments, governments, and courts. SAP Kosovo would also return under its older name, Kosovo and Metohija. The proposed amendments would identify Serbia "as a democratic state...based on freedom, the rights of man and the citizen, and the rule of law" as well as a "sovereign, integral, and unified state". The proposed constitution would also establish a multi-party system. The electoral system would also be revamped, abolishing the delegate system that was introduced in 1974. Parliamentary elections would be conducted under a first-past-the-post, two-round voting system with 250 constituencies.

The new constitution would also establish the office of president of Serbia, with broad powers to express unity and control foreign policy. According to the proposed changes, the president would be exempted from any subsequent ratification by the National Assembly, and his acts would be exempted from subjection either to the Constitutional Court of Serbia or the government. The president would also be able to recommend the candidate for prime minister after a parliamentary election, veto acts passed by the National Assembly, and dissolve the National Assembly if the government agreed. The option of recalling the president was also introduced with two-thirds of deputies in the National Assembly having to vote for it first, followed by a referendum on the matter. Opposition parties criticised the proposed changes that were given to the president of Serbia, claiming that it was written for "one person"—Milošević, and that there were no separation of powers. Political scientists Vladimir Goati and Milan Jovanović considered the constitution to be semi-presidential.

== Results ==
According to political scientist Robert Thomas, the call for boycott from the opposition were largely ignored because of the national themes that were presented in the referendum. One voter from Mokrin self-immolated outside of a voting station after voting. He left a message on the reverse of his ballot paper referring to himself as "the new Jan Palach".

Preliminary results published shortly after the referendum showed that a majority of voters approved it. Official results were published by RIK on 3 July, with them reporting that there were no irregularities or objections and that the voter turnout was 78%. The lowest turnout was in Kosovo, where Kosovo Albanians boycotted. Political scientist Mijodrag Radojević questioned the results due to the very high turnout in specific areas of Serbia.

Choice	Votes	%
For	5,162,320	97.34
Against	141,137	2.66
Total	5,303,457	100.00
Valid votes	5,303,457	99.48
Invalid/blank votes	27,505	0.52
Total votes	5,330,962	100.00
Registered voters/turnout	6,813,790	78.24
Source: Republic Electoral Commission

== Aftermath ==
In the aftermath of the referendum, the government of Serbia dissolved the Assembly of SAP Kosovo and its government. This was done in response to the proclamation of the Republic of Kosova on 2 July. "They tried to declare Kosovo a republic and by that they endangered Serbia and Yugoslavia", Sokolović said. This move was condemned by Amnesty International and the European Parliament. The Associated Press reported that this decision "is likely to cause more unrest by the ethnic Albanian majority in Kosovo". Ibrahim Rugova, the president of the Democratic League of Kosovo (LDK), said that "the decision to dissolve the regional parliament is an illegal one". The government of Serbia additionally restricted the media in Kosovo. This included Rilindja and Zeri i rinisë newspapers and Radio Television of Pristina. The 700,000 registered Kosovo Albanians boycotted the 1990 general elections. Rugova said that "to participate in these elections would mean that we accept the conditions the Serbians have imposed upon us".

SPS was formed on 17 July and the Assembly of SR Serbia adopted the Law on Political Organisations in the same month. This allowed SPS, DS, SNO, SPO, and others to become registered political parties in the now-multi-party system. Later in September, UOS organised another protest, demanding a ninety-day election campaign, more television airtime for opposition parties, and representation of the opposition in bodies that oversee the elections. Around 50,000 demonstrators attended the protest. Milošević declined to accept their demands. The opposition later demanded that the number of collected signatures to participate in the elections be lowered, considering that for the parliamentary election, the initial number of needed signatures was 500, while for the presidential elections, it was 10,000. The government accepted their proposal and lowered the number of required signatures for both elections to 100. The new constitution of Serbia was then officially proclaimed on 28 September and general elections were called for 9 December.

During the campaign period of the general election, according to Mihailović and Jovanović, SPS held an incalculable advantage due to the US$160,000,000 funds it gained at its formation. Additionally, SPS retained control over a majority of television, radio, and newspapers. SPS used the media to attack their political opponents and discredit candidates such as Drašković. Opposition parties lacked funding and infrastructure during the campaign. The general elections ultimately saw SPS win a supermajority of seats in the National Assembly due to the first-past-the-post system, despite winning less than 50% of the popular vote. Dragutin Zelenović of SPS was elected prime minister of Serbia after the elections.
