= Constitutional Court of Vojvodina =

Constitutional Court of Vojvodina Уставни суд Војводине (Serbo-Croatian) Ustavni sud Vojvodine (Serbo-Croatian) Vajdaság Alkotmánybírósága (Hungarian) Ústavný súd Vojvodiny (Slovak) Curtea Constituțională a Voivodinei (Romanian) Уставни суд Войводини (Pannonian Rusyn)
- Established: 1974
- Dissolved: 1990
- Jurisdiction: SAP Vojvodina
- Location: Novi Sad
- Authorised by: Constitution of Vojvodina

President
- Currently: Milivoj Vujadinović
- Since: late 1970s
- Lead position ends: 1980s

The Constitutional Court of Vojvodina (Serbo-Croatian: Ustavni sud Vojvodine, Уставни суд Војводине; Hungarian: Vajdaság Alkotmánybírósága; Slovak: Ústavný súd Vojvodiny; Romanian: Curtea Constituțională a Voivodinei; Pannonian Rusyn: Уставни суд Войводини) was a constitutional court that operated between 1974 and 1990, during the existence of the Socialist Autonomous Province of Vojvodina within the SR Serbia, SFR Yugoslavia.

The court was based on the 1974 Constitution of Vojvodina and exercised powers of judicial review within the province. It could declare provincial legislation unconstitutional, thereby rendering it ineffective. The court reviewed the constitutionality of statutes, the legality of ordinances and other secondary legislation, as well as the constitutionality of decisions issued by lower courts within the province. Archival material related to the work of the court, created between 1969 and 1991, is preserved at the Archives of Vojvodina in Novi Sad under the collection title Ustavni sud Vojvodine, reference code RS 002 F.456.

== History ==
=== Establishment and Functioning within Socialist Yugoslavia ===
The Constitutional Court of Vojvodina was established by the 1974 Constitution of the Socialist Autonomous Province of Vojvodina (Official Gazette of Vojvodina, No. 4/74), following the decentralization reforms introduced by the 1974 Constitution of Yugoslavia. Articles 395–414 of the Vojvodina Constitution defined the court’s jurisdiction, procedure, legal effect, publication, and enforcement of decisions, as well as its composition and organization. The establishment of the court was part of the broader 1974 constitutional reforms, which significantly expanded provincial autonomy within SR Serbia by creating a comprehensive system of provincial institutions. Alongside the Constitutional Court, a Supreme Court was also established in the same period.

In its daily practice the Constitutional Court of Vojvodina strictly enforced the requirement that normative acts, including statutes, ordinances, and municipal or self-management general acts, could not take legal effect before official publication. The court issued declaratory decisions to prevent the application of such acts until published, while recognizing their validity in principle. This approach was broadly consistent with the practices of the constitutional courts of Bosnia and Herzegovina and Croatia, but contrasted with the more permissive approach of the Constitutional Court of Montenegro.

The growing role of the court within the socialist Vojvodina self-management system was highlighted during the 1978 visit of President of the Executive Council Nikola Kmezić and President of the Presidency of SAP Vojvodina Radovan Vlajković. In the late 1970s, the court undertook a series of reviews aimed at assessing the conformity of self-management agreements and local administrative decisions with the constitutional and legal framework of the Socialist Autonomous Province of Vojvodina. Acting on its own initiative, the court examined agreements within organizations of associated labour in sectors of general public interest, such as postal, telecommunications, and electricity distribution enterprises, where monopolistic practices were suspected to persist. The court also reviewed decisions of municipal administrations in Vojvodina, including the requirement that the Novi Sad municipal assembly align its vehicle parking regulations with constitutional provisions and traffic safety laws.

On 16 April 1986, the court ruled against using “moral and political suitability” as a criterion in the hiring process in Vojvodina, leading to the removal of this requirement from job advertisements.

=== Abolition during the Anti-Bureaucratic Revolution ===
Following the Anti-bureaucratic revolution and the adoption of the 1990 Constitution of Serbia, the Constitutional Court of Vojvodina was abolished, with the Constitutional Court of Serbia assuming its pending cases, archives, and other records.

=== Post-1990 Period ===
During the 2006 constitutional reform debates, President of Serbia and leader of Democratic Party leader Boris Tadić initially expressed support for the Platform for European Constitution and for safeguarding the province’s autonomy. However, the DS leadership soon emphasized the need for compromise between national political actors, acknowledging that not all of provincial demands could realistically be met. The Reformists of Vojvodina accused the DS of abandoning the platform and failing to fulfil their promises regarding autonomy. Bojan Kostreš, President of the Assembly of Vojvodina and a member of the League of Social Democrats of Vojvodina underlined key differences between his party and the DS, noting that the LSV demanded full judicial authority for the province including provincial Supreme and Constitutional Courts.

== Presidents ==
- Aleksandar Fira (1974-?)
- Milivoj Vujadinović (late 1970s-1980s)

== See also ==
- Politics of Vojvodina
- Constitutional review
- Constitutional Court of Serbia
- Socialist law
