= Vida Petrović-Škero =

Serbian Supreme Court judge (born 1952)

Vida Petrović-Škero Вида Петровић-Шкеро
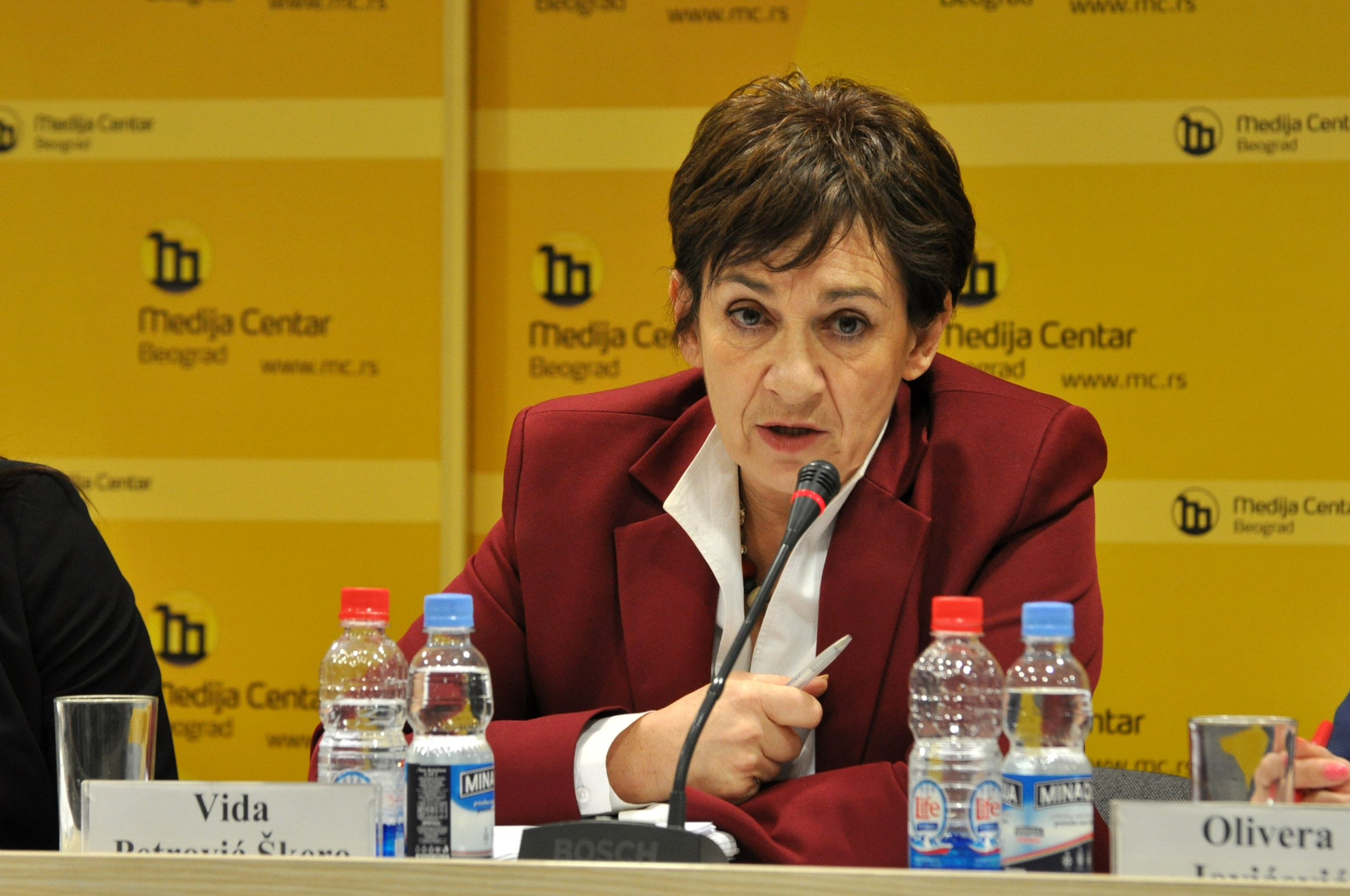

President of the Supreme Court of Serbia
- In office 9 March 2005 – 9 March 2009
- Appointed by: National Assembly of Serbia
- Succeeded by: Nata Mesarović (acting)

Personal details
- Born: 15 March 1952 (age 74) Belgrade, Serbia

Vida Petrović-Škero (Serbian: Вида Петровић-Шкеро; born 15 March 1952) is a Serbian judge. She served as the President of the Supreme Court of the Republic of Serbia between 2005 and 2009.

== Biography ==
She was born on 15 March 1952 in Belgrade, SR Serbia. She graduated from Twelfth Belgrade Gymnasium in 1970. In 1974 she graduated from the University of Belgrade's Law Faculty and in 1976 she passed the bar exam.

In her legal career Vida Petrović-Škero worked as the professional associate at the Second Municipal Court in Belgrade between 1976 and 1978. In 1978 she was appointed judge at the same court where she worked until 1995 and headed the civil disputes division. Between 1995 and 2000 she worked as a judge at the District Court in Belgrade. She was dismissed from the judges post in July 2000 during last months of Slobodan Milošević presidency and she worked as a lawyer until 2001. National Assembly of Serbia annulled the decision of her dismissal in 2001 and appointed Petrović-Škero as a President of the District Court in Belgrade. In 2002 she was elected Justice at the Supreme Court of Serbia and in 2005 she was appointed President of the Supreme Court.
