= Berkasovo =

Berkasovo Беркасово (Serbian) Беркасов (Pannonian Rusyn)
- Village (Selo)
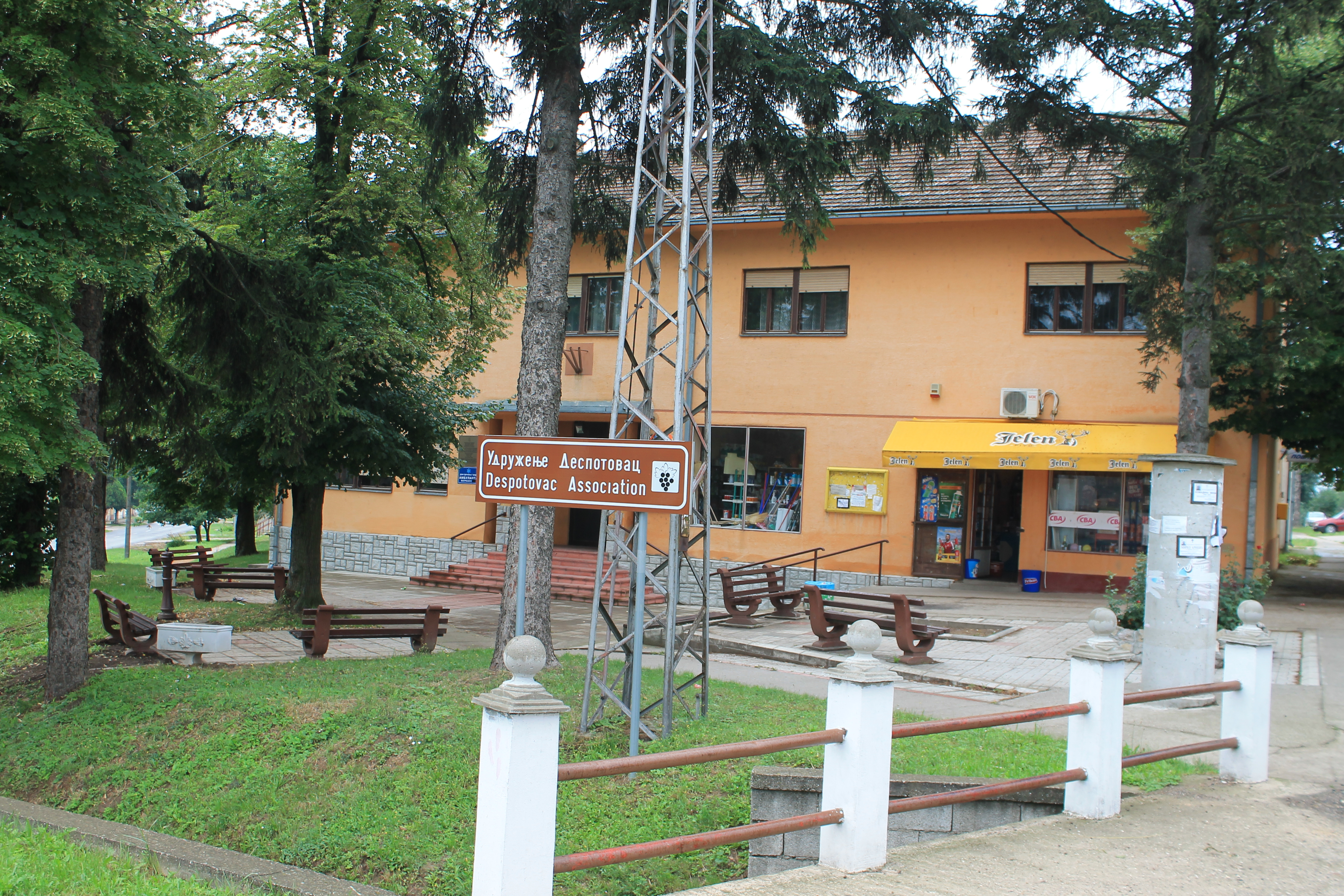

- Location within Vojvodina Location within Serbia Location within Europe
- Coordinates: 45°09′N 19°15′E
- Country: Serbia
- Province: Vojvodina
- Region: Syrmia
- District: Srem
- Municipality: Šid

Population (2002)
  - Total: 1,228
- Time zone: UTC+1 (CET)
  - Summer (DST): UTC+2 (CEST)

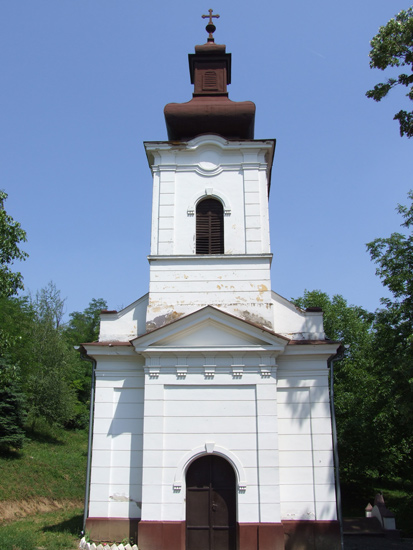
Serbian Orthodox church

Berkasovo (Serbian Cyrillic: Беркасово) is a village in Serbia. It is situated in the Šid municipality, in the Srem District, Vojvodina province. The village has a Serb ethnic majority and its population numbering 1,228 people (2002 census).

== History ==
It was first mentioned in the 13th century. In the 15th-16th century, Berkasovo was a possession of Serbian despots.

== Historical population ==
- 1961: 1,214
- 1971: 1,213
- 1981: 1,217
- 1991: 1,103
- 2002: 1,228

== See also ==
- List of places in Serbia
- List of cities, towns and villages in Vojvodina
- Berkasovo Monastery
- Church of Sts. Peter and Paul, Berkasovo
