= Constitutional Court (Serbia) =

Court that performs judicial review in Serbia

- Уставни суд
- Seal of the Constitutional Court

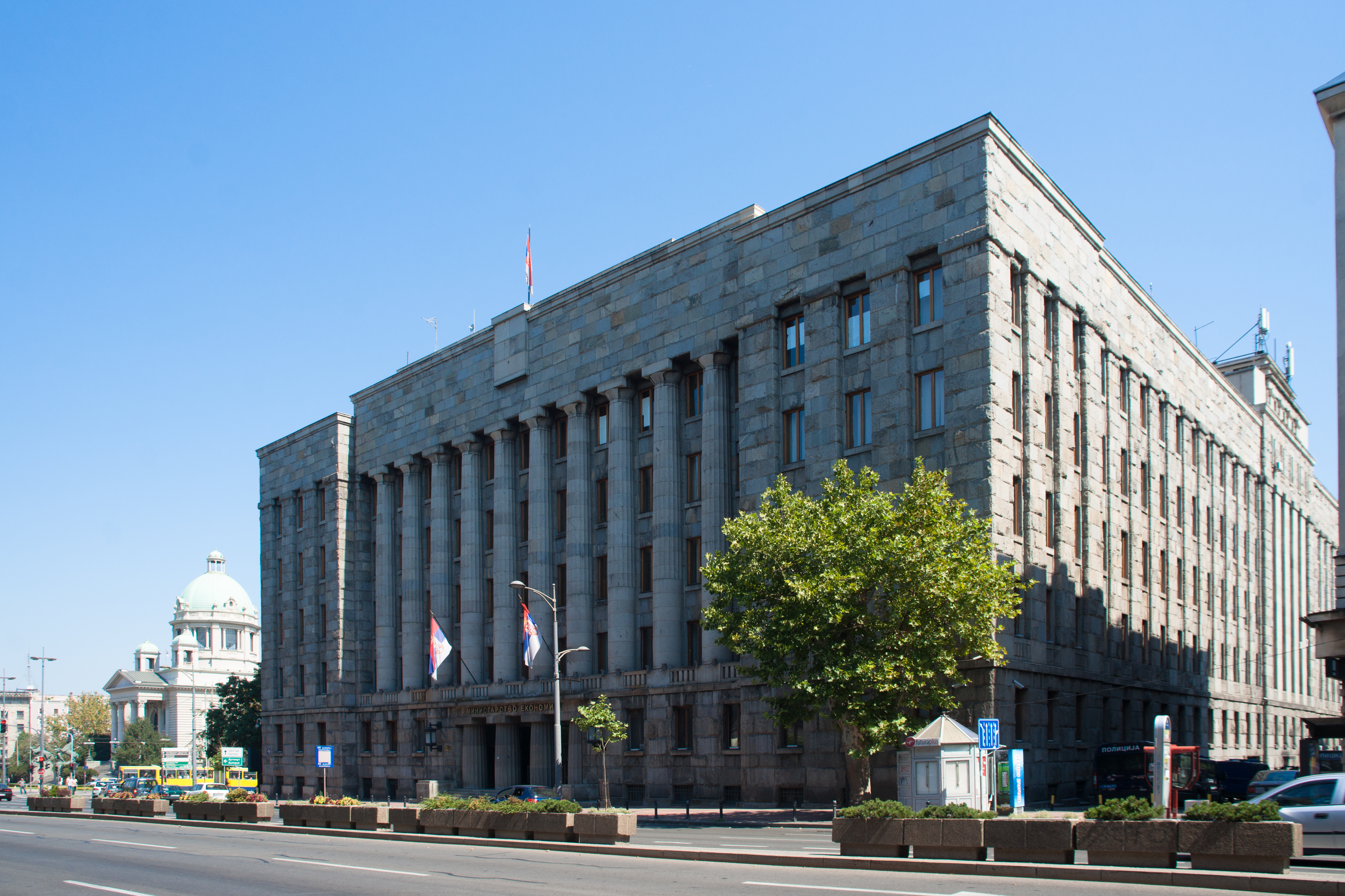
- Building of the Constitutional Court
- Established: 9 April 1963; 63 years ago
- Jurisdiction: Serbia
- Location: Main Post Office Palace (southern wing), Bulevar kralja Aleksandra 15, Belgrade
- Composition method: Parliament selection (5 members); Supreme Court selection (5 members); Presidential selection (5 members)
- Authorised by: Constitution
- Judge term length: 9 years
- Number of positions: 15
- Website: ustavni.sud.rs

President
- Currently: Vladan Petrov
- Since: 26 January 2026; 9 months ago

The Constitutional Court (Serbian: Уставни суд, romanized: Ustavni sud) is the court authorized to perform judicial review in Serbia. It rules on whether the laws, decrees or other bills enacted by the Serbian authorities are in conformity with the Constitution. It is not considered as part of the judicial branch, but a court sui generis.

The seat of the Constitutional Court is at the southern wing of the Main Post Office Palace in Belgrade. It consists of 15 judges, one of them being President of the Court.

== History ==
The Constitutional Court of the Socialist Republic of Serbia (then part of SFR Yugoslavia) was established by the Constitution of Socialist Republic of Serbia, adopted on 9 April 1963. The Court was to act as an independent body designated to protect constitutionality and legality in accordance with the Constitution and within the framework of the rights and duties proscribed by the Constitution. The "Constitutional Law of the Socialist Republic of Serbia", enacted on 25 December 1963, defined jurisdiction and adjudications before the Constitutional Court and legal effects of its decisions in a more specific manner. The Constitutional Court commenced its work on 15 February 1964.

Following the decentralization reforms introduced by the 1974 Constitution of Yugoslavia two additional provincial constitutional courts existed within the Socialist Republic of Serbia in SAP Vojvodina and Kosovo. Provincial Constitutional Court of Vojvodina and Kosovo were abolished in 1990 with the Constitutional Court of Serbia assuming remaining pending cases.

The Constitutional Court has upon proclamation of the 1990 Constitution acted within the framework of absence of division of powers, where the National Assembly was the highest body of state power. The Constitutional Court has through its presence and work contributed to the importance and contribution in preservation of the constitutional principles and legality.

== Composition ==
The Constitutional Court consists of 15 judges. Five of them are appointed by the President of the Republic, five by the National Assembly, and five are appointed at the General Session of the Supreme Court. Judges are elected to the 9-year term. The candidate for post of a constitutional court judge have to be accomplished jurist of at least 40 years of age and with at least 15 years of experience in jurisprudence. One person can be elected maximum of two times. After the election, the judges take oath before the President of the National Assembly.

The term of the Constitutional Court judge ends after 9 years since the election, or by resignation, by retirement or by impeachment. A constitutional court judge may not perform any other public office or any other job at all, except for being a professor at the law schools of one of the universities in Serbia. A constitutional court judge enjoys immunity from prosecution.

Composition as of 2026 (year of election in the parenthesis):

- Vladan Petrov (2019), president since 2026
- Nataša Plavšić (2019)
- Maja Popović (2025)
- Dobrosav Milovanović (2025)
- Mihajlo Rabrenović (2025)
- Milan Rapajić (2025)
- Bojan Tubić (2025)
- Zoran Lončar (2025)
- Atila Dudaš (2025)
- Nikola Banjac (2025)
- Ranka Vujović (2025)
- Ranka Vujović (2025)
- Jelena Deretić (2025)

As of 2026, two seats are vacant.

=== List of presidents ===
Status

Denotes service as acting President of the Court

No.	Portrait	Name (Birth–Death)	Took office	Left office
1		Petar Relić (1913–1990)	26 June 1963	31 July 1971
2		Jovan Đorđević (1908–1989)	15 July 1971	31 December 1979
3		Najdan Pašić (1922–1997)	1 January 1980	14 October 1984
4		Radoslav Ratković (1921–2013)	18 September 1984	7 November 1986
5		Đurđe Seničić (1931–2026)	5 May 1987	3 June 1989
6		Miodrag Bogdanović	3 June 1988	26 June 1990
7		Balša Špadijer (born 1936)	7 August 1990	30 June 1996
–		Ratko Butulija (1941–2026)	30 June 1996	25 December 1996
8		Ratko Butulija (1941–2026)	25 December 1996	17 December 2001
–		Verona Ádám Bokros (born 1948)	17 December 2001	20 June 2002
9		Slobodan Vučetić (born 1941)	20 June 2002	10 October 2006
–		Verona Ádám Bokros (born 1948)	10 October 2006	10 April 2007
–		Milutin Đuričić (born 1948)	10 April 2007	10 October 2007
–		Dragica Marjanović (born 1943)	10 October 2007	26 December 2007
10		Bosa Nenadić (born 1953)	26 December 2007	23 December 2010
–		Agneš Kartag-Odri (born 1951)	23 December 2010	3 February 2011
11		Dragiša Slijepčević (born 1955)	3 February 2011	3 February 2014
12		Vesna Ilić-Prelić (born 1960)	3 February 2014	12 December 2016
–		Goran Ilić (born 1965)	12 December 2016	26 January 2017
(12)		Vesna Ilić-Prelić (born 1960)	26 January 2017	26 January 2020
13		Snežana Marković (born 1959)	26 January 2020	26 January 2026
14		Vladan Petrov (born 1975)	26 January 2026	Incumbent

== Library of the Constitutional Court ==
The Library of the Constitutional Court is a specialized law library. The library is in charge of collecting, storing, cataloguing, and circulating literature from different branches of law, with special regard to constitutional legislation. The library is in possession of a large collection of monographs, serial publications, and collections of papers. In addition, it has an electronic database of legal acts.

The Constitutional Court Library owns a valuable collection of legal acts issued in the late 19th and early 20th centuries. The Library cooperates with the National Library of Serbia, Belgrade City Library, and libraries of similar profile.

== See also ==
- Constitution of Serbia
- Constitutionalism
