= Supreme Court (Serbia) =

Highest court in Serbia

- Врховни суд
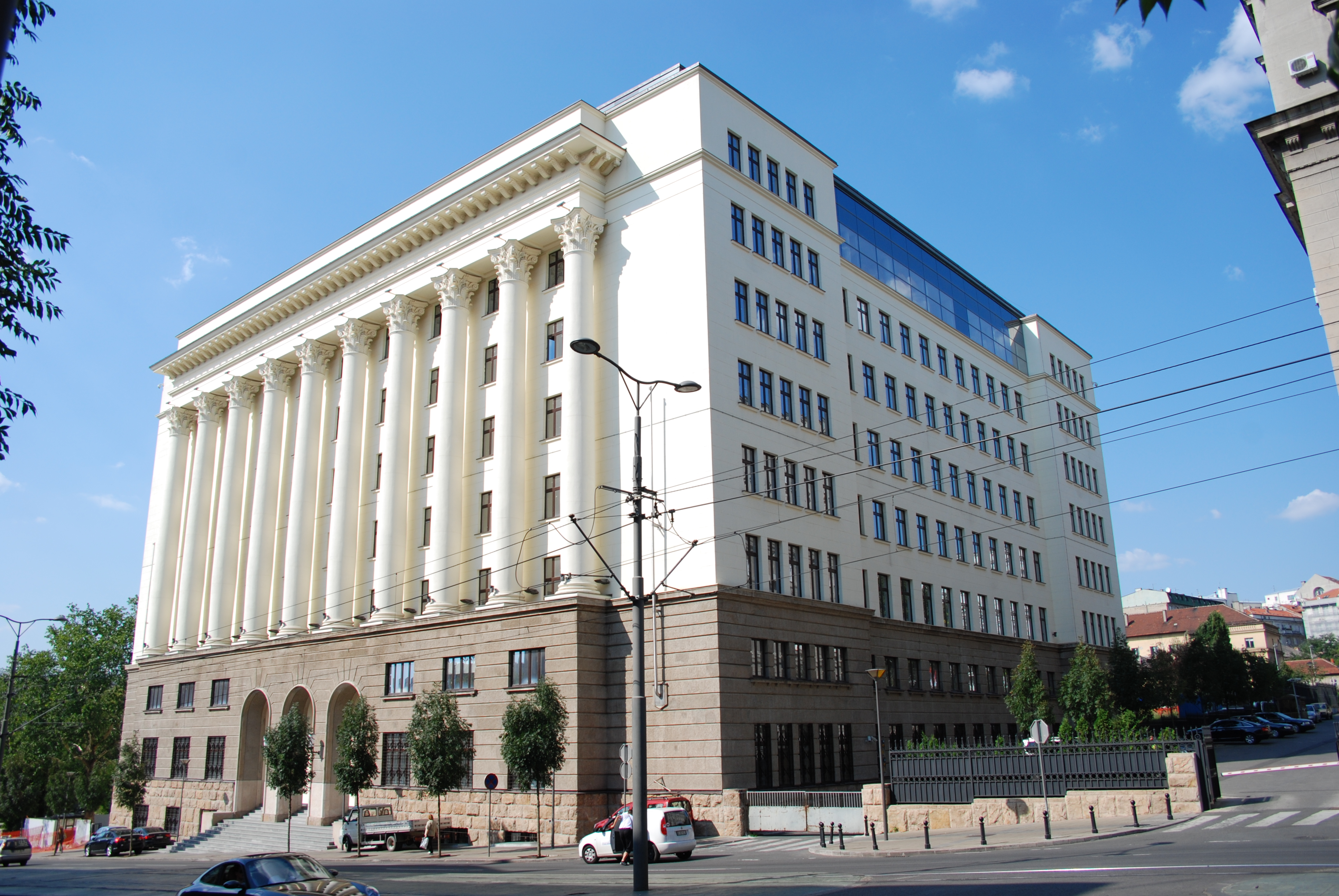
- Building of the Supreme Court
- Established: 1846; 180 years ago
- Jurisdiction: Serbia
- Location: 9 Nemanjina Street, Belgrade
- Website: vrh.sud.rs

President
- Currently: Jasmina Vasović
- Since: 16 April 2021; 5 years ago

The Supreme Court (Serbian: Врховни суд, romanized: Vrhovni sud) is the court of last resort in Serbia which reviews and possibly overturns previous rulings made by lower courts.

The seat of the Supreme Court is in Belgrade. The court is currently composed of 50 judges (including the president of the court), although the number of judges is periodically reviewed. The current president of the Supreme Court is Jasmina Vasović.

== History ==
=== Principality of Serbia and Kingdom of Serbia ===
The Supreme Land Court (Serbian: Врховни суд земаљски, romanized: Vrhovni sud zemaljski) of the Principality of Serbia was formed in 1846 as the court of last resort by the decree of Prince Aleksandar Karađorđević. It was composed of the president and four judges. The president and the judges were appointed by the Prince on the recommendation of the minister of justice. The court was a trial court, while the appeals were heard by the Prince himself.

The Supreme Land Court became the court of cassation (appellate court) in 1855 when it was renamed to The Most Glorious Supreme and Cassation Court (Serbian: Високославниј врховниј и касациониј суд, romanized: Visokoslavnij vrhovnij i kasacionij sud). The Court had a president and eight judges with two chambers. After the reorganization in 1858, the Court was reformed to The Most Glorious Court of Cassation (Serbian: Високославниј касациониј суд, romanized: Visokoslavnij kasacionij sud) and it lost the original jurisdiction, becoming solely the appellate court. The composition of the Court remained the same as before the reorganization. It heard the cases in civil law, criminal law, and cases involving the conflict of jurisdiction between the military, police and civil courts.

The modernization and strengthening of the judicial system in Serbia continued during the Defenders of the Constitution era (1842–1858). The results of this modernization were the separation of judicial and executive branch, creation of the positive law, weakening of Prince's autocracy and implementation of the financial control. After this, Prince Miloš Obrenović ruled the country for the second time (1858–1860). This period was marked by further development of the positive law and judicial independence. After Prince Miloš, his son Prince Mihailo came to power. He used the Serbo-Turkish War of 1862 to limit the executive and legislative power, but not the judiciary. The judicial procedure was formalised in this period.

Finally, the 1865 Law on the Organization of the Courts was passed, and the courts were organized into the district courts, the courts of appeal and the Court of Cassation. According to the law, the Court of Cassation (Serbian: Касациони суд, romanized: Kasacioni sud) had three chambers. The court was composed of 15 judges, one of them being the president. The judges were appointed by the Prince through a decree. The law gave the Court of Cassation the power of judicial interpretation instead of the minister of justice. The court was still under the Government's influence, but the judicial independence was constantly strengthening.

The 1869 Constitution, the 1888 Constitution and the 1881 Law on Judges confirmed the judicial independence and the three-level court system. An amendment to the 1895 Law on the Court of Cassation gave the Court of Cassation the power to interprets the law to the lower courts and to give legal opinions in certain cases.

The 1901 Law on Judges was very important for the development of the court system. The Court of Cassation became authorized to try a judge who was found to violate the law.

=== Kingdom of Yugoslavia ===
The first Constitution (Vidovdan Constitution) of the Kingdom of Yugoslavia was adopted in 1921. It enacted the unification of the judicial systems of the countries that formed the Kingdom. It authorized the creation of the singular Court of Cassation with its seat in Zagreb and with the jurisdiction over the whole nation. This Court was never actually created. The five Cassation Courts continued to work in the Kingdom: the Court of Cassation (Serbian: Касациони суд, romanized: Kasacioni sud) in Belgrade and its department in Novi Sad, the Supreme Court in Sarajevo, the Chamber of Seven in Zagreb, and the Great Court in Podgorica. Each of these courts had jurisdiction over a specific part of the kingdom.

The Court of Cassation in Belgrade continued to work with its jurisdiction over all the lower-level courts on the territory of the former Kingdom of Serbia, as well as on the territory of Banat, Bačka and Baranja and over the higher, appellate courts in Belgrade, Novi Sad and Skopje. After the reorganization of 1922, the Court of Cassation (and its department in Novi Sad) had 35 judges. The Department of the Court of Cassation in Novi Sad had jurisdiction over the territory of Banat, Bačka and Baranja. It had 5 judges. Judges were appointed by the King after the recommendation of the minister of justice. Although the courts were independent, this principle was often violated.

New "Law on the Organization of the Courts" was passed in 1928, and although it again authorized the creation of a single Court of Cassation in Zagreb, it was never formed. The decentralized judicial system proved quite problematic in practice. This led to many cases of conflicts of jurisdiction between the five courts.

During the so-called 6 January Dictatorship period, the effort were made to unify the courts of the country. The Supreme Judicial Council was formed in 1929, and it succeeded in the unification of the criminal law, civil law and procedural law in the country. A single Criminal Code was passed in 1929. The "National Court for the Protection of the State" was formed in 1929 as a department of Court of Cassation to protect the public regime and public security. A state prosecutor was appointed for this court. It was mostly deciding in the cases involving insulting of the King and the royal family. This became the highest court in the country, as there was no way to appeal its decision. It worked in chambers of seven judges each. They were appointed by the King on the recommendation of the minister of justice. This court later became independent.

=== World War II ===
During World War II, the "People's Liberation Committees" were enforced by the Communist Party of Yugoslavia as the bodies of people's authority. The "Committee for Justice" of the National Committee for the Liberation of Yugoslavia demanded the separation of judicial from executive power and judicial independence in the new communist Yugoslavia. In 1945, the "Law on the Organization of the People's Courts" was passed.

According to the federalism principle, the Supreme Courts of the six people's republics became the highest courts in the republics, and were entitled to decide on all appeals. According to the new communist principles of people's democracy, non-educated judges were allowed to be members of the courts along with law-educated judges.

Later in 1945, the Supreme Court of Yugoslavia (Serbian: Врховни суд Југославије, romanized: Vrhovni sud Jugoslavije) was created with its seat in Belgrade.

=== People's Republic of Serbia and Socialist Republic of Serbia ===
Judicial power on the territory of the People's Republic of Serbia was given to the "people's courts": municipal courts, district courts and the Supreme People's Court (Serbian: Врховни народни суд, romanized: Vrhovni narodni sud) with its seat in Belgrade. It functioned as both trial court and court of appeals. The Supreme People's Court of Serbia had a president, 14 judges and particular number of "people's co-judges" from common population. It had criminal and civil chambers and a disciplinary chamber. The Law proclaimed the courts to be free and independent from other branches of the government.

The organization of the courts was not changed until 1955. In 1954, new "Law on Courts" was passed, accompanied with the "Law on Commercial Courts" and "Law on Military Courts". The supreme courts of the republics became solely courts of appeals without original jurisdiction. The 1963 Constitution of Serbia did not bring any major changes to the judicial organization with the exception that the Supreme Court of AP Vojvodina was abolished, and the departments of the Supreme Court of Serbia for Vojvodina and Kosovo were established instead. This constitution authorized creation of the Constitutional Court of Serbia for the judicial review. With the 1971 amendments on the federal constitution, the judicial system was further decentralized, and the organization of the courts became the jurisdiction of the republics and autonomous provinces, therefore the supreme court of Vojvodina was reconstituted and the Supreme Court of Kosovo was established.

The 1974 Constitution of established some important principles of the judiciary: the constitutional principle of the independence of the courts, the principle of legality, the federal principle, the obligation to monitor and study social relations and phenomena, the constitutional principle of the public, the principle of assembly - collegiality, the principle of participation of working people and citizens in the trial, the principle of election, the principle of judicial immunity, the principle of special ethics of subpoena, the principle of two-tiered, the principle of exclusive jurisdiction, the principle of validity and enforceability court decisions, the principle of equality of citizens before the law, the principle of free use of one's own language and script, etc. These and other constitutional provisions and principles are consistently elaborated in the corresponding legal and other regulations.

=== Republic of Serbia ===
The 1990 Constitution enacted centralization with curbing autonomies of provinces of Vojvodina and Kosovo which was reflected on judicial system: supreme courts of province were abolished and the Supreme Court (Serbian: Врховни суд, romanized: Vrhovni sud) in Belgrade was the highest court for whole of Serbia. lower courts were municipal courts and district courts.

The 2006 Constitution changed the name of the court to the Supreme Court of Cassation (Serbian: Врховни касациони суд, romanized: Vrhovni kasacioni sud) thus emphasising its role as the court of cassation.

The 2022 constitutional amendments changed the name of the court back to the Supreme Court.

== Jurisdiction ==
=== Jurisdiction inside court proceedings ===
The Supreme Court decides on regular and extraordinary legal remedies instituted against decisions of all courts in Serbia and on other issues prescribed by the law. The Supreme Court decides on a conflict of jurisdiction between the courts and the transfer of jurisdiction of courts to facilitate conducting of procedure or other significant reasons.

=== Jurisdiction outside of court proceedings ===
- determines general legal positions in order to provide uniform application of law by courts;
- provides opinions on draft laws and other regulations relevant for performance of judicial authority;
- analyzes application of laws and other regulations and work of the courts;
- selects the invited members of the High Magistrate Council among judges and proposes candidates for one permanent member of the High Magistrate Council;
- determines criteria for evaluation of diligent and successful performance of judge's function;
- determines the activities that are contrary to the dignity and independence of a judge and damaging to the reputation of the court;
- determines the types and manner of advanced training of judges and performs other tasks prescribed by law;

== Composition ==
Current composition of the court (year of election to the Supreme Court is given in parentheses):

- Jasmina Vasović (president)
- Dragan Aćimović (2014)
- Jelica Bojanić Kerkez (2018)
- Dragana Boljević (2021)
- Branislav Bosiljković (2017)
- Nevenka Važić (2010)
- Dubravka Damjanović (2021)
- Zorana Delibašić (2018)
- Radmila Dragičević-Dičić (2010)
- Branka Dražić (2020)
- Spomenka Zarić (2014)
- Ilija Zindović (2019)
- Gordana Komnenić (2020)
- Zvezdana Lutovac (2010)
- Katarina Manojlović Andrić (2017)
- Dragana Marinković (2020)
- Marina Milanović (2019)
- Tatjana Miljuš (2020)
- Dragana Mirosavljević (2021)
- Slađana Nakić Momirović (2014)
- Danijela Nikolić (2020)
- Radoslav Petrović (2015)
- Ivana Rađenović (2021)
- Milena Rašić (2021)
- Biljana Sinanović (2010)
- Dragiša Slijepčević (2017)
- Jasminka Stanojević (2014)
- Branko Stanić (2014)
- Jasmina Stamenković (2020)
- Dobrila Strajina (2017)
- Vesna Subić (2017)
- Miroljub Tomić (2017)
- Svetlana Tomić Jokić (2021)
- Zoran Hadžić (2021)
- Bata Cvetković (2010)
- Gordana Džakula (2019)

=== List of presidents (since 1990) ===
Status

Denotes service as acting President of the Court

No.	Portrait	Name (Birth–Death)	Took office	Left office
Presidents of the Supreme Court
1		Časlav Ignjatović (1932–1996)	July 1990	May 1996
–		Balša Govedarica (born 1938)	May 1996	26 May 1998
2		Balša Govedarica (born 1938)	26 May 1998	14 February 2001
3		Leposava Karamarković (born 1941)	15 February 2001	22 April 2003
–		Sonja Brkić (born 1947)	21 March 2003 (Note: Acting for Karamarković.)	22 April 2003
4		Sonja Brkić (born 1947)	22 April 2003	22 April 2004
–		Janko Lazarević (born 1950)	22 April 2004	9 March 2005
5		Vida Petrović-Škero (born 1952)	9 March 2005	9 March 2009
–		Nata Mesarović (born 1950)	9 March 2009	1 January 2010
Presidents of the Supreme Court of Cassation
1		Nata Mesarović (born 1950)	1 January 2010	20 February 2013 (Note: Dismissed by the National Assembly.)
–		Dragomir Milojević (born 1954)	21 February 2013	6 December 2013
2		Dragomir Milojević (born 1954)	6 December 2013	7 December 2018
–		Dragomir Milojević (born 1954)	7 December 2018	16 April 2021
3		Jasmina Vasović (born 1969)	16 April 2021	9 February 2022
Presidents of the Supreme Court
6		Jasmina Vasović (born 1969)	9 February 2022	Incumbent

== See also ==
- Judiciary of Serbia
