= Socialist Autonomous Province of Vojvodina =

Province of Serbia in Yugoslavia (1945–1990)

Socialist Autonomous Province of Vojvodina Социјалистичка Аутономна Покрајина Војводина (Serbo-Croatian) Socijalistička Autonomna Pokrajina Vojvodina (Serbo-Croatian) Vajdaság Szocialista Autonóm Tartomány (Hungarian)
- Autonomous province of Socialist Republic of Serbia in Yugoslavia
- 1945–1990
- Flag Coat of arms

- Vojvodina (dark red) in Serbia (red), within Yugoslavia
- Capital: Novi Sad
- Area
  - 1991: 21,614 km^{2} (8,345 sq mi)
- Population
  - 1991: 1,952,533
- Government
  - Type: Unitary communist state
- Leader of the LCV
  - 1945–1946: Jovan Veselinov (first)
  - 1989–1990: Nedeljko Šipovac (last)
- Head of state
  - 1945–1947: Jovan Veselinov (Note: As Speaker of the National Assembly of Vojvodina)
  - 1988–1990: Jugoslav Kostić (Note: As President of the Presidency of Vojvodina)
- Legislature: National Assembly
- Historical era: Cold War
  - Provincial status: 1 September 1945
  - Autonomous Provincial status: 1968
  - Constitutional reform expanding autonomy: 1974
  - Constitutional reform reducing autonomy: 28 September 1990
Preceded by
Banat (1941–1944)
Kingdom of Hungary
Independent State of Croatia
Succeeded by
Autonomous Province of Vojvodina

The Socialist Autonomous Province of Vojvodina (Note: Serbo-Croatian: Socijalistička Autonomna Pokrajina Vojvodina / Социјалистичка Аутономна Покрајина Војводина; Hungarian: Vajdaság Szocialista Autonóm Tartomány) was one of the two autonomous provinces of the Socialist Republic of Serbia within Yugoslavia (the other being Kosovo), between 1945 and 1990. The province is the direct predecessor to the modern-day Serbian Autonomous Province of Vojvodina.

The province was formally created in 1945 in the aftermath of the World War II in Yugoslavia, as the Autonomous Province of Vojvodina. (Note: Autonomna Pokrajina Vojvodina / Аутономна Покрајина Војводина; Hungarian: Vajdaság Autonóm Tartomány) In 1968, it was granted a higher level of political autonomy, and the adjective Socialist was added to its official name. In 1990, after the constitutional reform influenced by what is known as the anti-bureaucratic revolution, its autonomy was reduced to the pre-1968 level, and the term Socialist was dropped from its name. It was encompassing regions of Srem, Banat and Bačka, with capital in Novi Sad.

Throughout its existence Serbs in Vojvodina constituted the largest ethnic group in the province with a parallel strong affirmation of multi-ethnic and multi-cultural elements central to the province's identity. Alongside Serbian standard of then official Serbo-Croatian, socialist Vojvodina officially used other languages including Hungarian, Pannonian Rusyn, Slovak and Romanian. After the opposition failed to secure any seats in the 1945 elections (followed by the formal introduction of a one-party system), the province was ruled by the League of Communists of Vojvodina, part of both the Serbian and wider Yugoslav ruling party.

== History ==
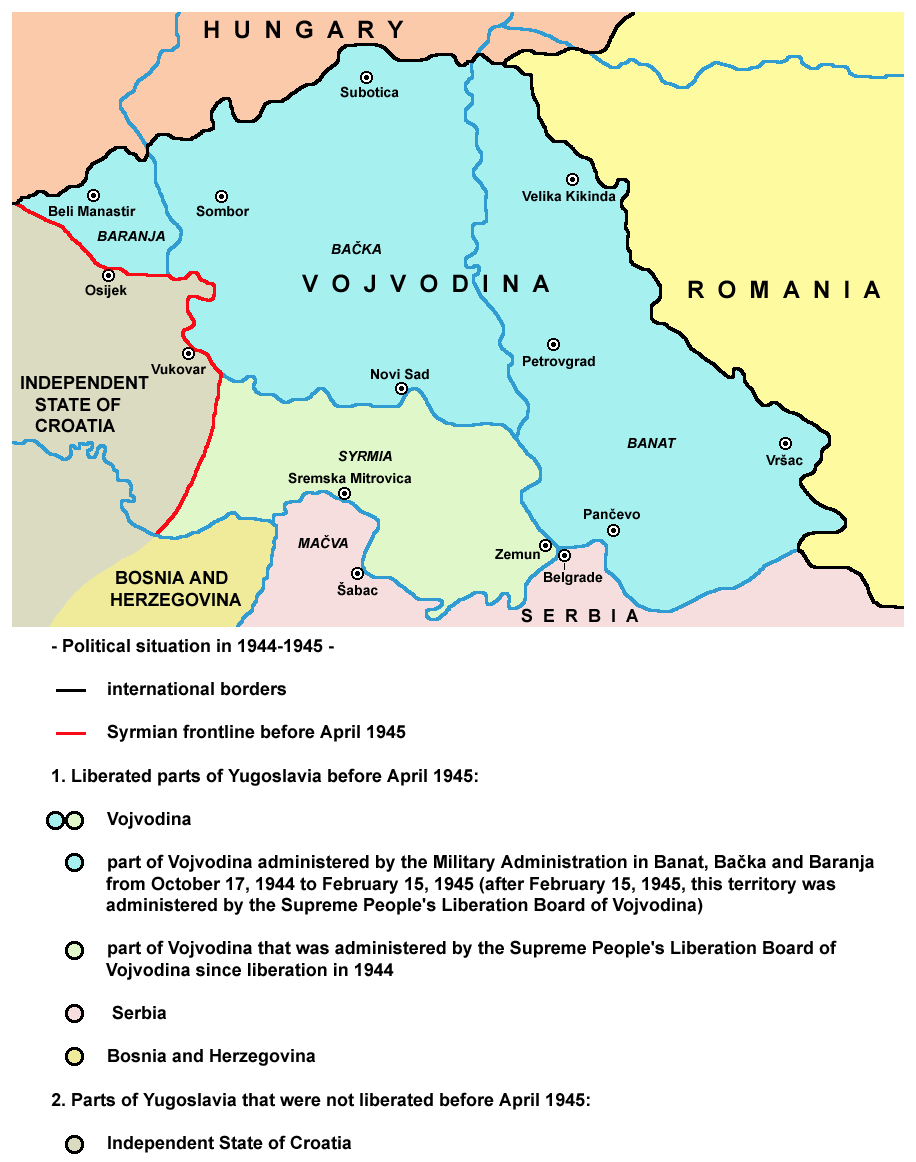
Political situation in 1944–1945

During the Second World War in Yugoslavia (1941–1945), the territory was occupied by the Axis powers. In the autumn of 1944, Yugoslav partisans and the Red Army expelled Axis troops from most parts the region which was then placed under military administration. At that time, the political status of the territory was not yet determined. The projected borders of future Vojvodina included the regions of Banat, Bačka, Baranja and most of the region of Syrmia, including Zemun. The de jure temporary border between Vojvodina and Croatia in Syrmia was Vukovar-Vinkovci-Županja line. De facto, western parts of Syrmia remained under Axis military control until April 1945. From 17 October 1944 to 27 January 1945, most of the region (Banat, Bačka, Baranja) was under direct military administration, and by the spring of 1945, provisional regional administration was created.

=== 1945–1968 ===
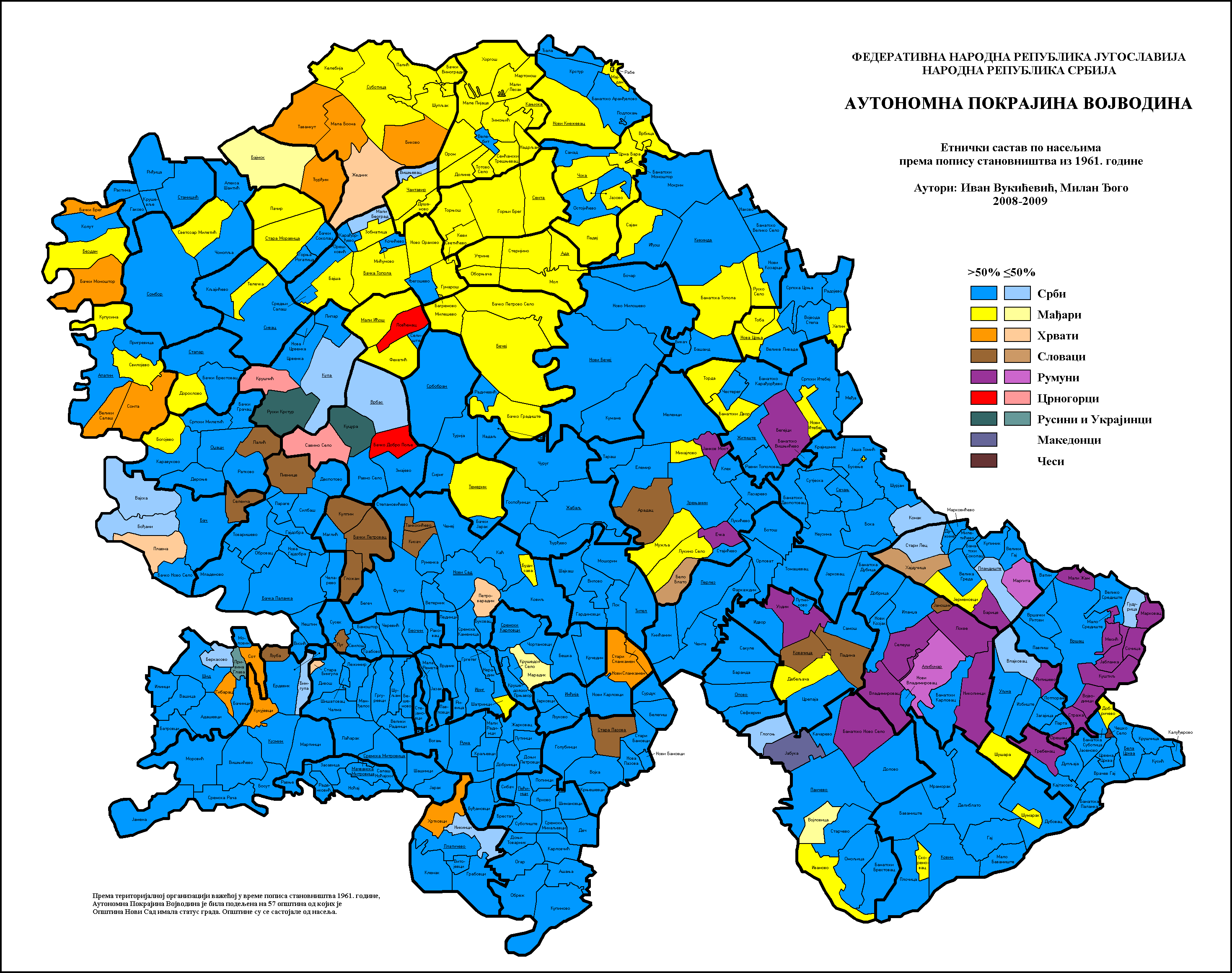
Ethnic map (1961)

The Autonomous Province of Vojvodina was formed in 1945, as an autonomous province within the People's Republic of Serbia, a federal unit of the Federal People's Republic of Yugoslavia.

The process was initiated on 30–31 July 1945, when the provisional provincial assembly of Vojvodina decided that the province should join Serbia. This decision was confirmed in the third AVNOJ assembly on 10 August 1945, and the law that regulated the autonomous status of Vojvodina within Serbia was adopted on 1 September 1945. The final borders of Vojvodina with Croatia and Central Serbia were defined in 1945: Baranja and western Syrmia were assigned to Croatia, while small parts of Banat and Syrmia near Belgrade were assigned to Central Serbia. A small part of northern Mačva near Sremska Mitrovica was assigned to Vojvodina. The capital city of the province was Novi Sad, which was also the capital of the former Danube Banovina province that existed before World War II.

The position of Vojvodina within Serbia was defined by the Constitution of Yugoslavia (1946) and the Constitution of Serbia (1947). The first Statute of the Autonomous Province of Vojvodina was adopted in 1948, and the second in 1953. After the constitutional reform in 1963, the third statute was adopted, in the same year.

=== 1968–1990 ===
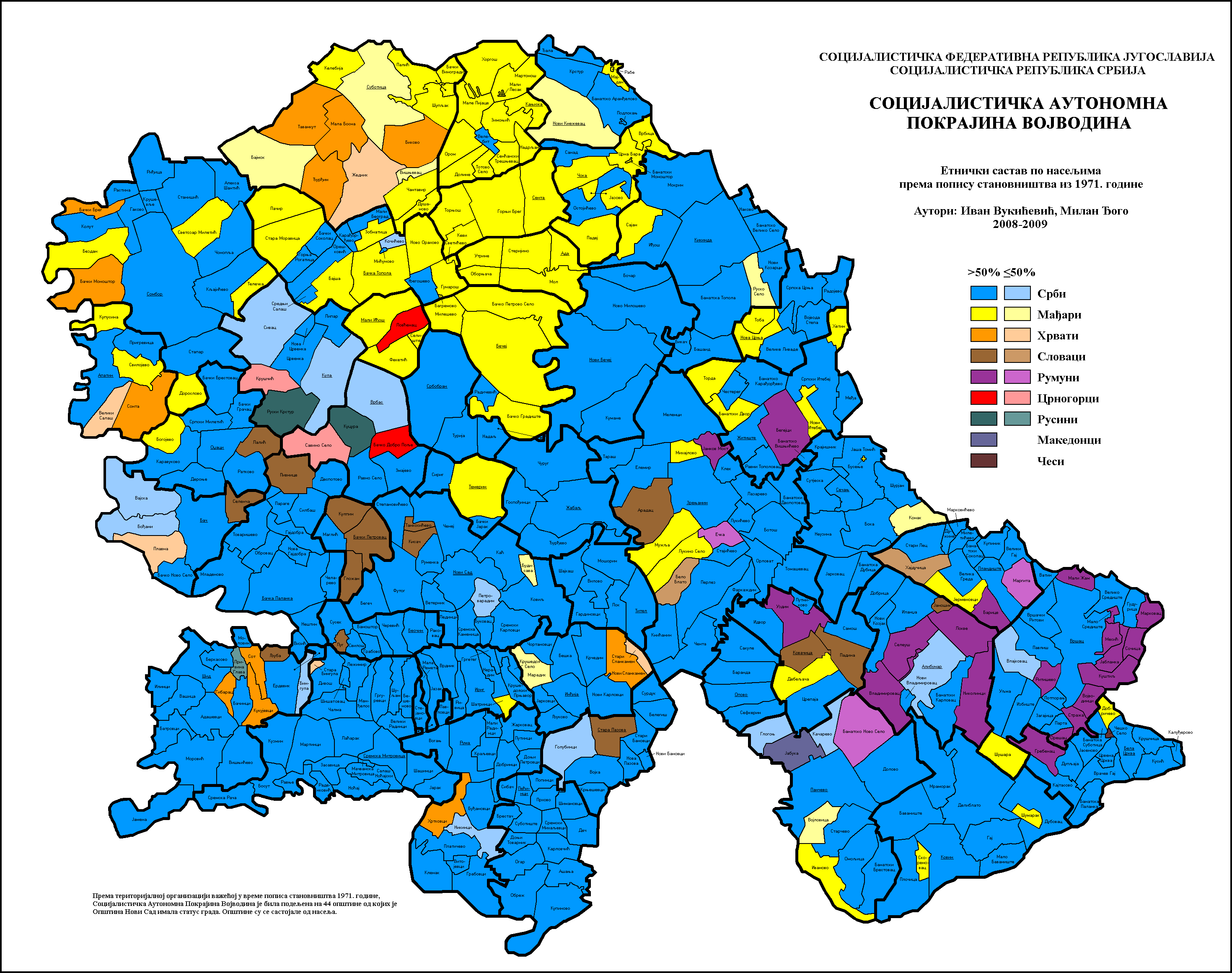
Ethnic map (1971)

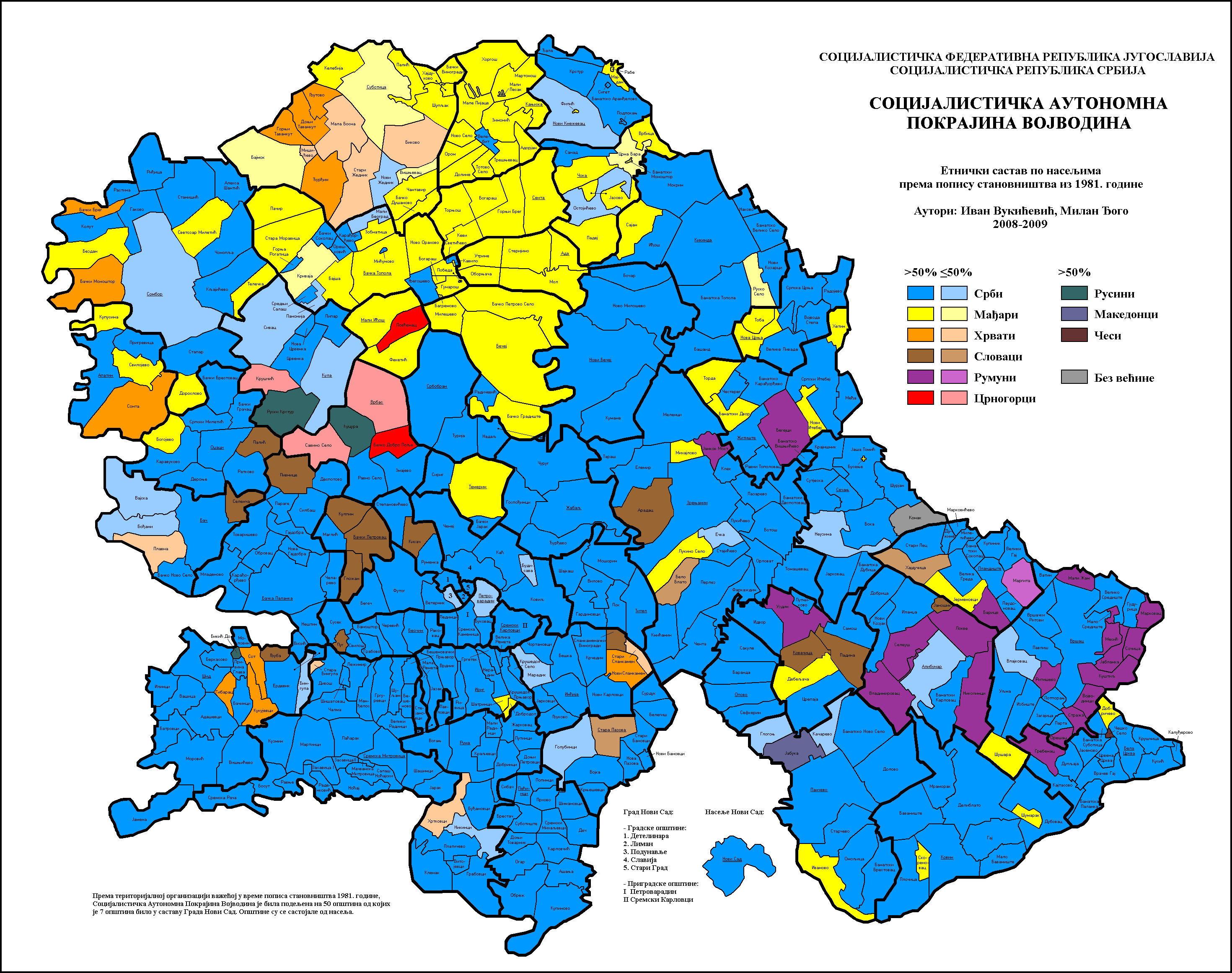
Ethnic map (1981)

Until 1968, Vojvodina enjoyed a limited level of autonomy within Serbia. After the constitutional reform that was enacted in 1968, the province was granted a higher level of autonomy and its name changed to the Socialist Autonomous Province of Vojvodina. Under the Constitutional Law of 21 February 1969, it achieved legislative autonomy, and in the same time, four minority languages were also recognized (besides Serbo-Croatian) as official languages (Article 67) in the province (Magyar, Slovak, Romanian, Pannonian Rusyn).

Under the 1974 Yugoslav Constitution, the province gained higher level of autonomy, that defined Vojvodina (still remaining within Serbia) as one of the subjects of the Yugoslav federation, and also gave it voting rights equivalent to Serbia itself on the country's collective presidency. The Constitution of the Socialist Autonomous Province of Vojvodina, (Note: Ustav Socijalističke Autonomne Pokrajine Vojvodine / Устав Социјалистичке Аутономне Покрајине Војводине) that was adopted in 1974, became the highest legal act of the province, replacing the previous Constitutional Law of 1969.

After the constitutional reform in Yugoslavia (1988), the process of democratization was initiated. In 1989, amendments to the Constitution of Serbia were adopted, limiting the autonomy of Vojvodina. Under the rule of the Serbian president Slobodan Milošević, the new Constitution of Serbia was adopted on 28 September 1990, omitting the adjective Socialist from the official names and further reducing the rights of autonomous provinces. After this, the Vojvodina was no longer a subject of the Yugoslav federation, but again only the autonomous province of Serbia, with limited level of autonomy. The name of the province was also reverted to the Autonomous Province of Vojvodina.

During the entire period from 1945 to 1990, the only authorized political party in the province was the League of Communists of Vojvodina, which was part of the League of Communists of Serbia and part of the League of Communists of Yugoslavia.

== Institutions ==
Institutions of the Socialist Autonomous Province of Vojvodina included:

- Presidency (Predsedništvo)
- Working bodies of presidency (Radna tela predsedništva):
  - Council for people's defence (Savet za narodnu odbranu)
  - Council for protection of constitutional system (Savet za zaštitu ustavnog poretka)
  - Commission for organizational and staff questions (Komisija za organizaciona i kadrovska pitanja)
  - Commission for amnesty (Komisija za pomilovanja)
  - Commission for applications and suggestions (Komisija za predstavke i predloge)
  - Commission for medals (Komisija za odlikovanja)
  - Commission for economic reform (Komisija za privrednu reformu)
- Parliament (Skupština)
- Councils of parliament (Veća skupštine):
  - Council of associated work (Veće udruženog rada)
  - Council of municipalities (Veće opština)
  - Social-political council (Društveno-političko veće)
- Provincial committees (Pokrajinski komiteti):
  - Provincial committee for energetics and raws (Pokrajinski komitet za energetiku i sirovine)
  - Provincial committee for international cooperation (Pokrajinski komitet za međunarodnu saradnju)
  - Provincial committee for traffic and connections (Pokrajinski komitet za saobraćaj i veze)
  - Provincial committee for water economy (Pokrajinski komitet za vodoprivredu)
  - Provincial committee for education and culture (Pokrajinski komitet za obrazovanje i kulturu)
  - Provincial committee for work (Pokrajinski komitet za rad)
  - Provincial committee for health and social protection (Pokrajinski komitet za zdravlje i socijalnu zaštitu)
  - Provincial committee for veteran and invalid questions (Pokrajinski komitet za boračka i invalidska pitanja)
  - Provincial committee for urbanism, residential questions and protection of human environment (Pokrajinski komitet za urbanizam, stambena pitanja i zaštitu čovekove sredine)
  - Provincial committee for informations (Pokrajinski komitet za informacije)
  - Provincial committee for social planning (Pokrajinski komitet za društveno planiranje)
  - Provincial committee for legislation (Pokrajinski komitet za zakonodavstvo)
  - Provincial committee for science and informatics (Pokrajinski komitet za nauku i informatiku)
- Provincial social councils (Pokrajinski društveni saveti):
  - Provincial social council for questions of social regulation (Pokrajinski društveni savet za pitanja društvenog uređenja)
  - Provincial social council for economic development and economic politics (Pokrajinski društveni savet za privredni razvoj i ekonomsku politiku)
  - Provincial social council for foreign relations (Pokrajinski društveni savet za odnose sa inostranstvom)
- Government (Izvršno veće)
- Provincial bodies of administration (Pokrajinski organi uprave):
  - Provincial secretarity for people's defence (Pokrajinski sekretarijat za narodnu odbranu)
  - Provincial secretarity for internal affairs (Pokrajinski sekretarijat za unutrašnje poslove)
  - Provincial secretarity for jurisdiction and administration (Pokrajinski sekretarijat za pravosuđe i upravu)
  - Provincial secretarity for finances (Pokrajinski sekretarijat za finansije)
  - Provincial secretarity for industry, construction, and terciar activities (Pokrajinski sekretarijat za industriju, građevinarstvo i tercijarne delatnosti)
  - Provincial secretarity for agriculture, food industry and wood industry (Pokrajinski sekretarijat za poljoprivredu, prehrambenu industriju i šumarstvo)
  - Provincial secretarity for market, prices, monitoring of economic developments and tourism (Pokrajinski sekretarijat za tržište, cene, praćenje privrednih kretanja i turizam)
- Provincial administrative organizations (Pokrajinske upravne organizacije):
  - Provincial establishment for social planning (Pokrajinski zavod za društveno planiranje)
  - Provincial establishment for statistics (Pokrajinski zavod za statistiku)
  - Provincial establishment for public administration (Pokrajinski zavod za javnu upravu)
  - Provincial establishment for international scientific, cultural, educational and technical cooperation (Pokrajinski zavod za međunarodnu naučnu, kulturnu, prosvetnu i tehničku saradnju)
  - Provincial establishment for hydro-meteorogy (Pokrajinski hidrometeorološki zavod)
  - Provincial establishment for staff affairs (Pokrajinski zavod za kadrovske poslove)
  - Provincial establishment for prices and monitoring of economic developments (Pokrajinski zavod za cene i praćenje privrednih kretanja)
  - Provincial administration for geodetic and property-juridical affairs (Pokrajinska uprava za geodetske i imovinsko-pravne poslove)
  - Administration for budget (Uprava za budžet)
  - Provincial administration for social profit (Pokrajinska uprava društvenih prihoda)
  - Provincial directorate for stock reserves (Pokrajinska direkcija za robne rezerve)
  - Services for general and joint affairs of provincial institutions (Službe za opšte i zajedničke poslove pokrajinskih organa)
- Jurisdictional institutions of SAP Vojvodina (Pravosudni organi SAP Vojvodine):
  - Constitutional Court of Vojvodina (Ustavni sud Vojvodine)
  - Supreme court of Vojvodina (Vrhovni sud Vojvodine)
  - Public prosecution of SAP Vojvodina (Javno tužilaštvo SAP Vojvodine)
  - Public juristical defence of SAP Vojvodina (Javno pravobranilaštvo SAP Vojvodine)
  - Provincial social juristical defender of autonomy (Pokrajinski društveni pravobranilac samoupravljanja)
  - Court of associated work (Sud udruženog rada)

=== Presidents ===
Presidents of the Presidency of Socialist Autonomous Province of Vojvodina:

- Radovan Vlajković (1974–1981)
- Predrag Vladisavljević (1981–1982)
- Danilo Kekić (1982–1983)
- Đorđe Radosavljević (1983–1984)
- Nandor Major (1984–1985)
- Predrag Vladisavljević (1985–1986)
- Đorđe Radosavljević (1986–1988)
- Nandor Major (1988–1989)
- Jugoslav Kostić (1989–1991)

== Demographics ==
1948 census

Ethnicity	Number	%
Serbs	841,246	50.6
Hungarians	428,932	25.8
Croats	134,232	8.1
Slovaks	72,032	4.3
Romanians	59,263	3.6
Germans	31,821	1.9
Montenegrins	30,589	1.9
Rusyns and Ukrainians	22,083	1.3
Macedonians	9,090	0.5
Romani	7,585	0.4
Slovenes	7,223	0.4
Russians	5,148	0.3
Czechs	3,976	0.3
Bulgarians	3,501	0.2
Yugoslavs	1,050	0.1
Others	5,441	0.3

1953 census

Ethnicity	Number	%
Serbs	865,538	50.9
Hungarians	435,179	25.6
Croats	127,027	7.5
Slovaks	71,153	4.2
Romanians	57,218	3.4
Montenegrins	30,516	1.8
Rusyns	23,038	1.4
Macedonians	11,622	0.7
Others	78,254	4.6

1961 census

Ethnicity	Number	%
Serbs	1,017,713	54.9
Hungarians	442,560	23.9
Croats	145,341	7.8
Slovaks	73,830	4
Romanians	57,259	3.1
Montenegrins	34,782	1.9
Rusyns	23,038	1.4
Macedonians	11,622	0.7
Others	83,480	4.4

According to the 1981 census, the population of the province included:

- Serbs = 1,107,375 (54.4%)
- Hungarians = 385,356 (18.9%)
- Croats = 119,157 (5.9%)
- Slovaks = 69,549 (3.4%)
- Romanians = 47,289 (2.3%)
- Montenegrins = 43,304 (2.1%)
- Rusyns and Ukrainians = 24,306 (1.2%)
- Others = 238,436 (11.8%)

== See also ==
- Vojvodina
- History of Vojvodina
- Socialist Federal Republic of Yugoslavia
- Socialist Republic of Serbia
- Socialist Autonomous Province of Kosovo
- 1944–1945 killings in Vojvodina

== Sources ==
- Bennett, Christopher (1995). Yugoslavia's Bloody Collapse: Causes, Course and Consequences. London: Hurst & Company. ISBN 978-1-85065-228-1.
- Ćirković, Sima (2004). The Serbs. Malden: Blackwell Publishing. ISBN 978-1-4051-4291-5.
- Pavlowitch, Stevan K. (2002). Serbia: The History behind the Name. London: Hurst & Company. ISBN 978-1-85065-477-3.
- Petranović, Branko (1980). Istorija Jugoslavije 1918-1978. Beograd: Nolit.
- Petranović, Branko (1988). Istorija Jugoslavije 1918-1988. Vol. 3. Beograd: Nolit.
- Petranović, Branko (2002). The Yugoslav Experience of Serbian National Integration. Boulder: East European Monographs. ISBN 978-0-88033-484-6.
- Ramet, Sabrina P.; Pavlaković, Vjeran, eds. (2007) [2005]. Serbia Since 1989: Politics and Society Under Milošević and After. Seattle: University of Washington Press. ISBN 978-0-295-80207-7.
- Tomasevich, Jozo (2001). War and Revolution in Yugoslavia, 1941–1945: Occupation and Collaboration. Vol. 2. San Francisco: Stanford University Press. ISBN 978-0-8047-7924-1.
