= 2024–2026 Serbian anti-corruption protests =

- Part of Gen Z protests
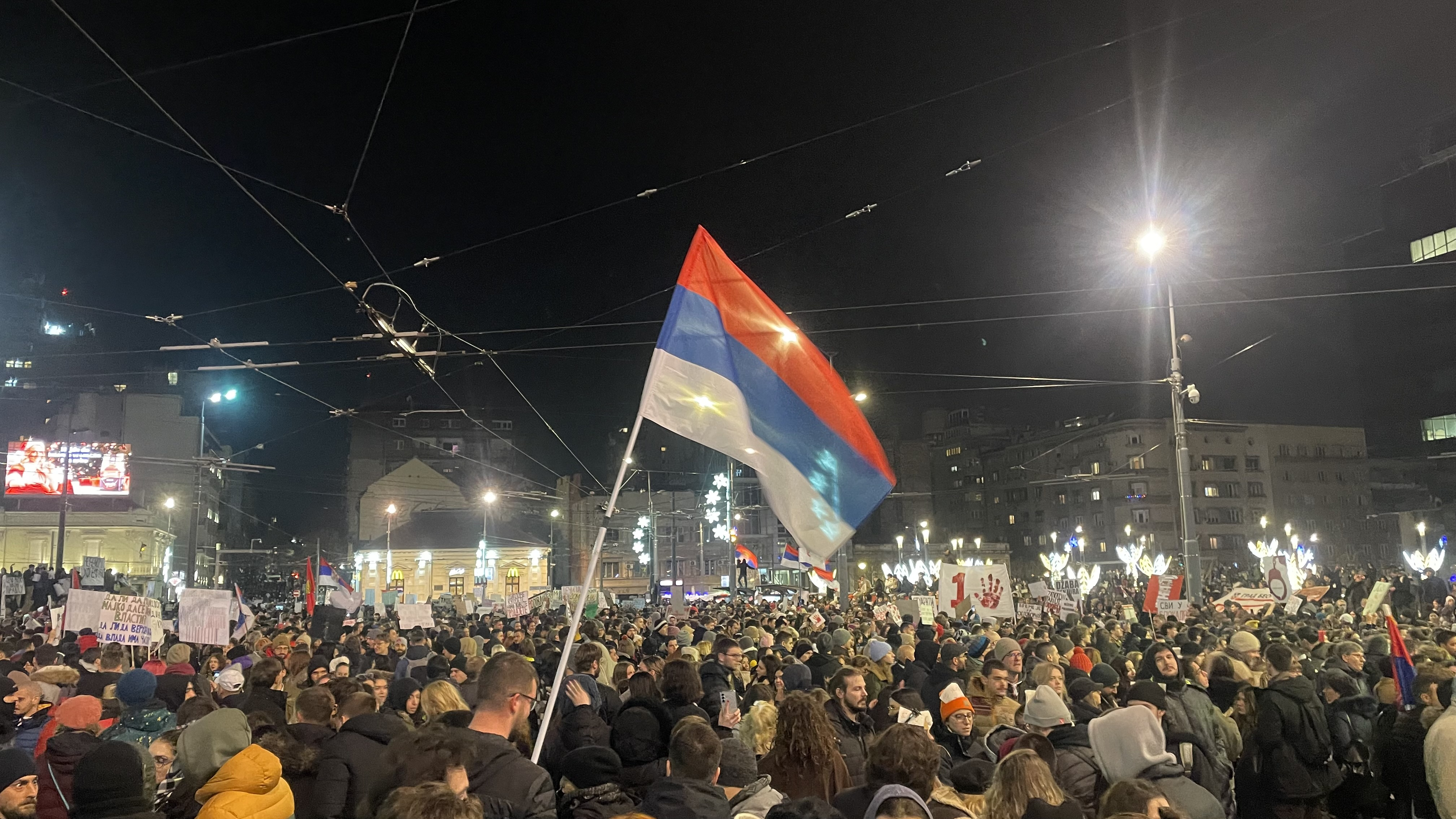
- Protesters at Slavija Square in Belgrade on 22 December 2024
- Date: 1 November 2024 – 25 October 2026 (1 year, 11 months, 3 weeks and 3 days)
- Location: Serbia: Serbian diaspora
- Caused by: Novi Sad railway station canopy collapse; Government corruption; Media censorship; State capture; Authoritarian government; Political violence; Excessive force by police
- Goals: Initial demands: Justice for victims of the railway station collapse; Accountability for government negligence; Resignation of Goran Vesić and several other senior state officials; Formalized student demands: Publishing of all documents related to the reconstruction of the Novi Sad railway station; Confirmation from the authorities on the identity of all individuals for whom there is reasonable suspicion of physically assaulting students and professors, as well as initiating criminal proceedings against them; Dismissal of all public officials who assaulted students and professors; The dismissal of criminal charges against arrested and detained students at protests, as well as the termination of already initiated criminal proceedings; An increase in the budget for higher education by 20 percent; Investigation regarding the possible use of a sonic weapon (since 5 April); Investigation regarding the responsibility of the president and journalists being present at ICU after Kočani nightclub fire (since 7 April); Snap parliamentary elections (since 5 May); Government response: False compliance; Cosmetic arrests; Scapegoating; Surveillance; Political dismissal; Mobility restrictions; Information blackout and media monopolisation; Counter-rallies; Exceeding authority; Astroturfing; Intimidation; Lawfare; Selective enforcement; Arbitrary arrest and detention; Vandalism targeting political opponents; Instrumentalized conspiracy theory; Violent local election rigging; Voter suppression
- Methods: Demonstrations; Traffic blockades; Civil disobedience; Internet activism; Occupation; General strike; Peace walks
- Status: Student victory: Resignation of Aleksandar Vučić and concession of 2026 Serbian parliamentary election
- Concessions: Resignation of Goran Vesić; Resignation of Jelena Tanasković; Resignation of Tomislav Momirović; Resignation of Damir Zobenica; Resignation of Milan Đurić; Resignation of Miloš Vučević; Some of the documents related to the reconstruction of the Novi Sad railway station published; An increase in the budget for higher education by 20% (partially fulfilled - government increased only material costs portion of budget); Resignation of Aleksandar Vučić; Snap parliamentary election

Parties
(Serbia) Anti-corruption protesters; Students; Education workers; Actors and filmmakers; Artists and cultural workers; Farmers; Lawyers; Healthcare workers; Citizens; War veterans; Bikers; Bus drivers; Miners; Trade unions; Senior citizens; Student List (from September 2026); Support: (Serbia) Serbian parliamentary opposition and activists; International support: Progressive Alliance of Socialists and Democrats; European Green Party; Renew Europe; Party of the European Left; DiEM25	Government of Serbia (Vučević and Macut Cabinets); Security Intelligence Agency; Police of Serbia; Gendarmery; Special Anti-Terrorist Unit; Parapolice; Government parties; Serbian Progressive Party (SNS)-led coalition; Socialist Party of Serbia-United Serbia coalition (SPS-JS); Other groups; SNS-affiliated thugs; Serbian far-right organizations (Note: Including the Serbian Nationalist Movement, ultranationalist party formed by Miša Vacić (the Serbian Right party and 1389 Movement leader), Pavle Bihali (Leviathan Movement leader) and Goran Davidović Firer (leader of banned Nacionalni stroj organization).); Serbian Radical Party (SRS); Serbian Party Oathkeepers (SSZ); JSO veterans; Foreign support: Republika Srpska; Russia; Belarus; Hungary (until 9 May 2026); Slovakia

Lead figures
Non-centralized students' union leadership	Aleksandar Vučić; Miloš Vučević; Ana Brnabić; Siniša Mali; Ivica Dačić; Bratislav Gašić; Aleksandar Šapić; Maja Gojković; Aleksandar Vulin; Dejan Vuk Stanković; Boris Bratina; Milica Đurđević; Milenko Jovanov; Andrej Vučić; Vladimir Đukanović; Dragan J. Vučićević; Milan Radoičić; Milorad Dodik; Milan Knežević

Number
Major protest rallies: 325,000 in Belgrade (15 March 2025); 180,000–190,000 in Belgrade (23 May 2026); 169,000 in Kragujevac (15 February 2025); 100,000–150,000 in Belgrade (22 October 2026); 140,000 in Belgrade (28 June 2025); ~110,000 in Novi Sad (1 November 2025); 102,000 in Belgrade (22 December 2024)	Government rallies: 55,000 in Belgrade (13 April 2025); 21,000–23,000 in Sremska Mitrovica (16 February 2025); ~14,000 in Belgrade (5 November 2025); 14,000 in Jagodina (25 January 2025)

Casualties and losses
Student/protester casualties: Several students hospitalized (January–August 2025); 22 protesters sought medical help (28 June 2025); 80+ civilians injured (13 August 2025)	Police casualties: 48 police officers injured (28 June 2025); 27 police officers injured (13 August 2025)

Mass protests took place in Serbia from November 2024 to October 2026. They began in Novi Sad after the canopy of the city's railway station collapsed on 1 November 2024, eventually killing 16 people and severely injuring one. By March 2025, student-led protests calling for accountability had spread to 400 cities and towns across Serbia. Prime Minister Miloš Vučević resigned in January 2025, and in May 2025 the students added a demand for a snap parliamentary election. Aleksandar Vučić resigned as president on 27 September 2026 to head the ruling coalition's list in the snap parliamentary election, and the protests ended after the Student List, formed by the student movement, won an absolute majority of seats in the election on 25 October 2026.

Student blockades of universities began on 25 November 2024 at the Faculty of Dramatic Arts in Belgrade, three days after its students and professors were attacked during a silent tribute to the victims of the collapse. Other faculties and high schools soon joined. Protesters held daily "Serbia, stand still" (Serbian: Застани, Србијо, romanized: Zastani, Srbijo) traffic blockades in silence, starting at 11:52 am, the time of the collapse, and lasting one minute for each of the dead: 15 minutes at first and 16 after the death of the sixteenth victim in March 2025.

During 2025 the movement turned to sustained civil disobedience, including extended road blockades, marches between cities, blockades of the headquarters of Radio Television of Serbia (RTS) and a series of mass rallies, the largest of which, in Belgrade on 15 March 2025, was described as the largest protest in Serbia's modern history. Confrontations escalated from mid-2025: after a rally in Belgrade on 28 June, protesters blocked roads across the country, and in August clashes between protesters, police and supporters of the ruling Serbian Progressive Party (SNS) left dozens injured on both sides.

Most universities remained blockaded for almost a year; teaching resumed in all previously blockaded institutions at the start of the 2025/2026 academic year in November 2025.

== Background ==
On 1 November 2024, the canopy of the Novi Sad railway station collapsed, initially killing 14 people and injuring three, two of whom later died, on 17 November 2024 and 21 March 2025. The collapse led to widespread concern in Serbia, with many questioning the structural integrity and maintenance oversight of public infrastructure. An investigation into the causes was launched, but frustration grew over a lack of accountability. The station building, constructed in 1964, was renovated from 2021 to mid-2024 as part of a project under China's Belt and Road Initiative. As of March 2025, the official cause of the collapse was still under investigation, while government corruption and non-transparent dealings with Chinese contractors were widely blamed.

== Course of the protests ==
=== 2024 ===
On 22 November 2024, students and professors of the Faculty of Dramatic Arts (FDU) in Belgrade were physically attacked during a 15-minute silent tribute to the victims of the canopy collapse. The students began a blockade of the faculty on 25 November and called on students of other faculties to do the same. On 22 December, a student-led rally at Slavija Square in Belgrade drew more than 100,000 people.

=== 2025 ===
Students called a general strike for 24 January 2025 and blockaded the Autokomanda interchange in Belgrade on 27–28 January; Prime Minister Miloš Vučević announced his resignation on 28 January. Large regional rallies followed, including one in Kragujevac on 15 February, to which students walked, ran or cycled from across Serbia, and the rally in Belgrade on 15 March, the largest in the country's modern history.

In April 2025, students and citizens blockaded the RTS headquarters for 14 days (see below). Smaller groups of students also took their campaign abroad. A cycling tour to Strasbourg, announced by students of the University of Novi Sad in blockade, set off from Novi Sad on 3 April with about 80 participants and arrived on 15 April, to deliver letters about the situation in Serbia to the Council of Europe and EU institutions. A group of 21 students then ran a relay ultramarathon of almost 2,000 km from Novi Sad to Brussels, from 25 April to 12 May, carrying letters to the leadership of the European Parliament.

On 5 May 2025, the students in blockade jointly demanded the dissolution of the National Assembly and a snap parliamentary election, a proposal first adopted in late April by the plenum of the Faculty of Technical Sciences in Novi Sad. In June the students gave the government until 9 pm on Vidovdan, 28 June 2025, to set the election in motion, warning that citizens would otherwise turn to civil disobedience. When the deadline passed during a rally of about 140,000 people in Belgrade, the students gave citizens a "green light"; clashes with police followed, and from the next day protesters blocked roads across the country in what students called "decentralised controlled chaos" (see below). In mid-August 2025, attacks by SNS supporters on protesters in Vrbas and Bačka Palanka set off several nights of clashes across Serbia (see below).

Teaching resumed at the blockaded faculties at the start of the 2025/2026 academic year in November 2025. On 1 November 2025, around 110,000 people attended a commemoration in Novi Sad on the first anniversary of the collapse, according to the Archive of Public Gatherings.

=== 2026 ===
Local elections held in several municipalities on 29 March 2026 were marked by violence, including an attack on citizens by masked men in Kula. On 23 May 2026, between 180,000 and 190,000 people gathered at Slavija Square, according to the Archive of Public Gatherings. The National Assembly was dissolved on 9 September 2026 and a snap parliamentary election was called for 25 October. Vučić resigned as president on 27 September. In the election, the Student List won 53.69% of the valid votes and 140 of the 250 seats, against 39.48% and 103 seats for the list headed by Vučić.

== Notable protests ==
Most protests were organised by the student movement.

=== Autokomanda blockade ===
On 27 January 2025, three days after a general strike called by the students, thousands of students blocked the Autokomanda interchange in Belgrade, one of the city's busiest intersections, for 24 hours. Farmers on tractors joined the protesters. President Aleksandar Vučić called the blockade unlawful but called on the police to provide full security to its participants, and said during the blockade that he would fulfil the students' demands, pardon those arrested in earlier protests and reshuffle the government. The blockade ended on the morning of 28 January, the day Prime Minister Miloš Vučević announced his resignation; the students said their demands had not been met.

=== March 2025 Slavija rally ===
On 15 March 2025, a student-led rally was held at Slavija Square in Belgrade. Authorities estimated attendance at 88,000–107,000, while the Archive of Public Gatherings estimated 275,000–325,000; the protest was described as the largest in Serbia's modern history. Public transport to Belgrade was suspended that morning "for security reasons". During a 15-minute silence for the victims of the canopy collapse, a loud sound around the eleventh minute caused the crowd to scatter. Opposition politicians and protesters alleged that police had used a sonic weapon (LRAD) against the crowd; the Serbian Army denied possessing or using a sonic cannon, and Interior Minister Ivica Dačić acknowledged that the police own such a device but denied it was used. The day after the rally, Vučić acknowledged "enormous negative energy and anger" directed at the authorities and said the government would have to change. The European Commission called for a swift, transparent and credible investigation. In September 2026, the Higher Public Prosecutor's Office in Belgrade concluded that no sonic weapon had been used and attributed the crowd's movement to a "panic chain reaction"; the European Court of Human Rights had earlier indicated an interim measure against the use of sound devices for crowd control.

=== RTS blockade ===
On 14 April 2025, students, citizens and military veterans blockaded the headquarters of Radio Television of Serbia (RTS) on Takovska Street and its studios in Košutnjak, accusing the public broadcaster of biased coverage of the protests. The students said the blockade would last until a new competition for the Council of the Regulatory Authority for Electronic Media (REM) was announced, or until RTS was shut down. RTS called the blockade illegal and filed a criminal complaint against unknown persons, and broadcast its main news programme from an undisclosed location. The blockade ended after 14 days, on 28 April, once the parliamentary Committee for Culture and Information voted to cancel the earlier REM Council competition and start a new one. It followed an earlier 22-hour blockade of the building on 11 March 2025.

=== Vidovdan rally and civil disobedience ===
On 24 June 2025, students in blockade at the Belgrade universities gave the government until 9 pm on 28 June (Vidovdan) to propose the dissolution of the National Assembly and to have the police remove the pro-government gatherings in Pioneers Park and in front of the National Assembly building. Otherwise, they said, they expected citizens to be ready to take "all existing measures of civil disobedience". About 140,000 people attended the rally at Slavija Square on 28 June. Shortly after 9 pm, the students gave the crowd a "green light", took off their marshal vests and declared that it was no longer a student protest but a citizens' one. Clashes with police followed near the Presidency, in which, according to Al Jazeera, 48 police officers were injured and 22 protesters sought medical help; 77 protesters were arrested. Two days later, the students said the green light had not been a signal for an assault, violence or revenge, but "a light for the future".

After two of their colleagues were detained on 29 June, students of the Faculty of Agriculture in Belgrade called for "decentralised controlled chaos", urging people to "be disobedient locally, everywhere and at every moment", and blocked intersections in Zemun. The blockades spread in a chain to other parts of Belgrade and to Novi Sad, Požarevac, Užice, Smederevo and Niš. Over the following days, thousands of protesters blocked roads and intersections, demanding the release of those arrested and a snap election, while police dismantled the blockades and detained demonstrators. On 4 July, the students called for a total blockade of Belgrade from 7 am.

=== August 2025 clashes ===
On the evening of 12 August 2025, supporters of the SNS gathered outside the party's offices in Vrbas and Bačka Palanka, many of them with covered faces, fired fireworks and firecrackers at protesting citizens and students, who responded by throwing bottles and eggs; N1 reporters said the police at first did not intervene. Police Director Dragan Vasiljević said the protesters "came to attack" party supporters in Vrbas, while the protesters said they had been attacked first; Vučić called the demonstrators "thugs".

The events set off student-led protests under the slogan "Serbia, wake up" in more than 30 towns and cities on 13 and 14 August. In Novi Sad, SNS supporters launched fireworks and flares at demonstrators outside the party's headquarters, and protesters smashed its windows; riot police used tear gas there and near SNS offices in New Belgrade. According to Al Jazeera, more than 80 civilians and 27 police officers were injured on 13 August, as protesters in northern Serbia targeted the governing party's offices. Journalists were also attacked; a reporter of the Novi Sad portal 192 was beaten and a Razglas reporter was struck on the head with a baton.

=== Pre-election Slavija rally ===
On 22 October 2026, the Student List held its final campaign rally at Slavija Square, three days before the 25 October parliamentary election. Columns of students who had marched from various parts of Serbia arrived in Belgrade the previous evening and were welcomed by thousands of people. Attendance was reported as more than 100,000 to around 150,000. Hours earlier, the list headed by Vučić held its own pre-election event at the Ranko Žeravica sports hall in New Belgrade. In the election, the Student List won a parliamentary majority.

== Symbols and slogans ==
A red handprint, a symbol commonly used by the protesters.

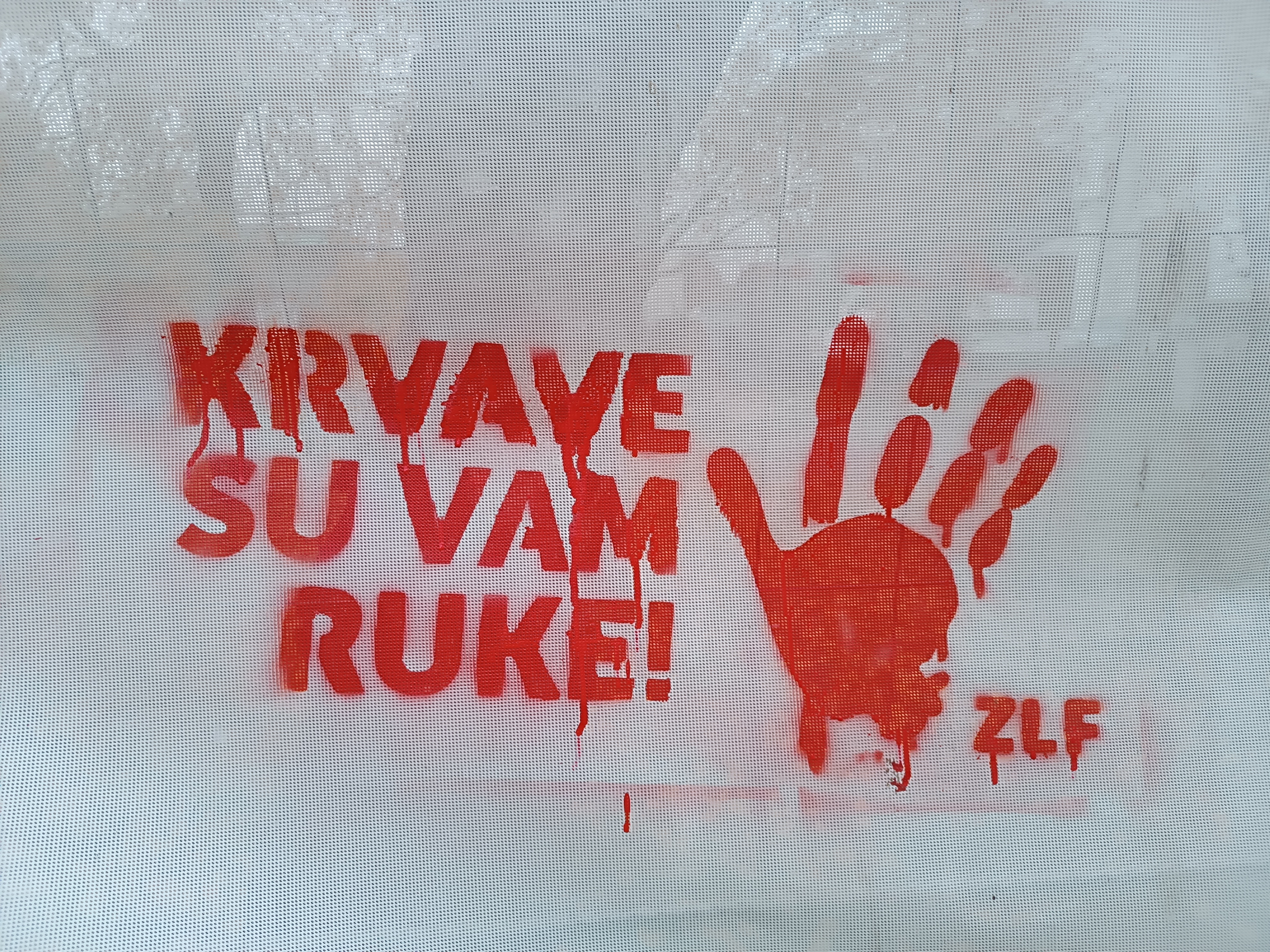
Red handprints with Your hands are bloody! (Serbian: Krvave su vam ruke!) text on the left

A common protest slogan was "corruption kills". Protest symbols included red handprints with the caption "Your hands are bloody!", referring to the authorities and ruling politicians, and bleeding doves, with the dove being one of the symbols of Novi Sad. Banners were a prominent feature of the protests and blockades. Most of them mentioned Vučić and other members of the ruling party, the public prosecutor Zagorka Dolovac, and generally expressed support for the students. Some featured quotes or references from Serbian and pop culture, such as Better Call Saul ("Not Even Saul Will Save You"), Grand Theft Auto VI ("The People Rose Up Before [the Release of] GTA VI"), Game of Thrones' Daenerys Targaryen, Charli XCX's album Brat, among others. National Serbian flags, both contemporary and historical, as well as the flags of many Serbian cities and municipalities, and university and faculty flags, were common sights at protests. Ferrari flags and paraphernalia, once a prominent symbol of opposition to the Milošević regime, also made a return. Students also often accused Vučić of acting ultra vires by involving himself in matters outside his constitutional powers as President of Serbia, summed up in the slogan "You're not in charge".

Some banners also included the word "ćaci" ("ћаци"), a reference to the anti-protest graffiti ćaci u školu; this was largely seen as an attempt by the ruling SNS to provoke the students, but it backfired because of the creator's typo. The pro-government encampment in Pioneers Park was widely dubbed ćacilend by protesters. Another catchphrase, originating on the social news aggregator Reddit, was "pump it" (pumpaj), meaning to "keep increasing the pressure", which also appeared in memes and on banners. A related phrase, "stew it" (dinstaj), was popularised by sociologist Jovo Bakić.

=== Slogans ===
Some of the most common and memorable slogans used during the protests were:

- Студенти побеђују! ("Students are winning!")
- Пумпај! ("Pump it up!")
- Ко не скаче тај је ћаци! ("Whoever isn't jumping is a ćaci!")
- Врати коњу главу, Драгане! ("Dragan, give the horse its head back!")
- Руке су вам крваве! ("Your hands are covered in blood!")
- Корупција убија! ("Corruption kills!")
- Сви у блокаде! ("Everyone out to the blockades!")
- Нико није уморан, РТС је блокиран! ("Nobody's tired — RTS is blocked!")
- Распиши изборе! ("Call the elections!")
- Је л' се знојиш док нас бројиш? ("Are you sweating while you're counting us?")
- Ниси надлежан (а ниси ни нормалан)! ("You're not in charge (and you're not even sane)!")
- Хуља се љуља! ("The scoundrel is swaying!")
- Ако журите, идите метроом! ("If you're in a hurry, take the metro!")
- ЕКСПОдираћу! ("I'm gonna EXPOde!")
- Машинци против машинерије! ("Engineering students against the machine!")
- Не лажите ми бабу! ("Don't lie to my grandma!")
- Један човек среће немао! ("One man devoid of fortune!")
- Оде Александар! ("Aleksandar is gone!")
- Победа, победа! ("Victory, victory!")
- Готов је! ("He's finished!")

=== Songs ===
Some of the most common and memorable songs played at the protests were:

- YU rock misija – Za milion godina (lit. "In a Million Years")
- Gala – Freed from Desire
- Snežana Savić – Tri poljupca hoću ja (lit. "I Want Three Kisses")
- Zorica Marković – Lijte kiše (lit. "Pour Down, Rains!")
- Dara Bubamara – Polje jagoda (lit. "A Field of Strawberries")
- Džej Ramadanovski – Slavija (lit. "Slavija Square")
- Bajaga i instruktori – Pada vlada (lit. "The Government Is Falling")
- Bajaga i instruktori – Što ne može niko, možeš ti (lit. "What No One Can Do, You Can")
- Bajaga i instruktori – Pesma slobode (lit. "Song of Freedom")
- Đorđe Balašević – Živeti slobodno (lit. "Living Freely")

== Government response ==
Ahead of the protests in Belgrade on 15 March and 28 June 2025, public transport in Belgrade was halted, most private bus companies cancelled departures to and from the city the day before, and passenger trains to and from Belgrade were stopped over alleged bomb threats. An attempt by students in Niš to organise transport to Belgrade failed after a private bus company reportedly received threats from people close to the government not to transport students.

== Reactions ==
=== Criticism ===
Russian President Vladimir Putin voiced support for the Serbian authorities and rejected what he called a "colour revolution".

US President Donald Trump's special envoy, Richard Grenell, wrote on X that the United States supports peaceful demonstrations but does not support "those who undermine the rule of law or who forcefully take over government buildings."

=== European Union ===
The European Commission and the Council of the European Union neither supported nor condemned the protests. On 28 January 2025, a group of Serbian public figures sent a letter to EU officials, including European Commission President Ursula von der Leyen, urging them to become more actively involved in supporting a "free, democratic and European Serbia". (Note: While the European Union showed strong support for democratic protests in Venezuela and Georgia, the European Commission and the Council of the European Union offered no such support for the protests in Serbia, and EU officials stated they would not accept or support a "violent change of power" in the country. Students in Serbia, part of the country's media and some European analysts interpreted this as tacit support for Vučić.) The European Commission's director-general for enlargement, Gert Jan Koopman, was quoted as saying that the EU "will not accept or support a violent change of power in Serbia."

Many supporters of the protests interpreted this as tacit backing for the Vučić government. Several days after the 15 March 2025 protest in Belgrade, Vučić met with European Commissioner for Enlargement Marta Kos in Brussels, a meeting the EU diplomat described as "constructive." Kos made no mention of the alleged use of a sound cannon against protesters the weekend before, drawing criticism from protesters and their supporters. Support for EU membership fell in Serbia after the protests began, as many protest supporters came to see the EU as standing in the way of democratisation, and EU flags and other pro-European symbols were noticeably absent from rallies.

=== Domestic support ===
By January 2025, around 4,000 university professors and teaching assistants had publicly supported the students' demands.

==== Political organizations ====
Political organizations which supported the protests include:

- Red Action / Red Initiative
- NKPJ/SKOJ

==== Professional associations and cultural institutions ====
A number of associations and cultural institutions supported the protests, including:

===== Professional associations =====
- Serbian Medical Society
- Dental Chamber of Serbia
- Bar Association of Serbia
- Association of Writers of Serbia
- PEN Center Serbia
- Association of Drama Artists of Serbia
- Association of Screenwriters of Serbia
- Association of Composers of Serbia
- Association of Musical Artists of Serbia
- Association of Jazz, Pop and Rock Musicians of Serbia
- Association of Literature Translators of Serbia
- ICOM Serbia

===== Theatres and orchestras =====
- National Theatre in Belgrade
- Ballet Ensemble of National Theatre
- Belgrade Philharmonic Orchestra
- Belgrade Drama Theatre
- Yugoslav Drama Theatre
- Terazije Theatre
- Atelje 212
- Zvezdara Theatre
- Teatar na brdu
- Boško Buha Theatre
- Duško Radović Theatre
- Serbian National Theatre in Novi Sad
- Orchestra of Serbian National Theatre's Opera
- Novi Sad Theatre
- Novi Sad Youth Theatre
- National Theatre in Niš
- Niš Puppet Theatre
- Princely Serbian Theatre
- Kragujevac Children's and Youth's Theatre
- National Theatre of Sombor
- National Theatre of Zrenjanin
- Lazarevac Puls Theatre

===== Museums, libraries and archives =====
- Ethnographic Museum of Serbia
- Historical Museum of Serbia
- Museum of Yugoslavia
- Belgrade Museum of Contemporary Art
- Belgrade Museum of Applied Arts
- Belgrade Museum of Natural History
- Museum of Vojvodina
- National Library of Serbia
- Belgrade's Historical Archives
- Yugoslav Film Archive

===== Music festivals =====
- Exit music festival
- Nišville jazz festival

==== Public figures, artists and celebrities ====
Numerous public figures, artists and celebrities from Serbia, as well as from other former Yugoslav republics supported the protests, including:

===== Writers =====
- Vladimir Arsenijević
- Sonja Atanasijević
- Vladislav Bajac
- Matija Bećković
- Miljenko Jergović
- Dušan Kovačević
- Jasminka Petrović
- Vedrana Rudan
- Milisav Savić
- Ljubomir Simović
- Dejan Stojiljković
- Dragan Velikić
- Marko Vidojković
- Vladislava Vojnović

===== Visual artists =====
- Marina Abramović
- Dušan Otašević
- Dušan Petričić
- Jugoslav Vlahović

===== Actors =====
- Anja Alač
- Ljubomir Bandović
- Mira Banjac
- Petar Benčina
- Miloš Biković
- Predrag Bjelac
- Dragan Bjelogrlić
- Aleksej Bjelogrlić
- Ljiljana Blagojević
- Snežana Bogdanović
- Svetlana "Ceca" Bojković
- Voja Brajović
- Ljubomir Bulajić
- Bojan Dimitrijević
- Slaven Došlo
- Miodrag "Miša" Dragičević
- Tamara Dragičević
- Nebojša Dugalić
- Jelena Đokić
- Elizabeta Đorevska
- Nikola Đuričko
- Nebojša "Cile" Ilić
- Marko Janketić
- Milica Janketić
- Nina Janković
- Goran Jevtić
- Ivan Jevtović
- Anđela Jovanović
- Dragan "Gagi" Jovanović
- Branka Katić
- Gordan Kičić
- Nikola Kojo
- Vuk Kostić
- Andrija Kuzmanović
- Bojana Maljević
- Danica Maksimović
- Anastasia "Anja" Mandić
- Anita Mančić
- Iva Manojlović
- Hadži Nenad Maričić
- Milan Marić
- Miona Marković
- Pavle Mensur
- Dragan Mićanović
- Danijela "Nela" Mihailović
- Ivan Mihailović
- Milan "Caci" Mihailović
- Milica Mihajlović
- Radoslav "Rale" Milenković
- Andrija Milošević
- Isidora Minić
- Vjera Mujović
- Nataša Ninković
- Josip Pejaković
- Tijana Pečenčić
- Suzana Petričević
- Gorica Popović
- Branka Pujić
- Aleksandar Radojičić
- Milena Radulović
- Hana Selimović
- Jelisaveta "Seka" Sablić
- Viktor Savić
- Isidora Simijonović
- Tihomir "Tika" Stanić
- Bojana Stefanović
- Anđelka Stević Žugić
- Jelena Stupljanin
- Rade Šerbedžija
- Miloš Timotijević
- Srđan Timarov
- Branislav Tomašević
- Branislav Trifunović
- Sergej Trifunović
- Vesna Trivalić
- Milena Vasić
- Marija Vicković
- Radovan Vujović
- Bojan Žirović
- Katarina Žutić

===== Film and theatre directors =====
- Radivoje "Raša" Andrić
- Stanko Crnobrnja
- Srđan Dragojević
- Stevan Filipović
- Srdan Golubović
- Rajko Grlić
- Srđan Karanović
- Emir Kusturica
- Goran Marković
- Nikita Milivojević
- Kokan Mladenović
- Vida Ognjenović
- Slobodan Šijan
- Želimir Žilnik

===== Music artists =====
Composers

- Vojislav "Bubiša" Simić
- Aleksandra Vrebalov

Rock musicians and bands

- Atheist Rap
- Autopark
- Babe
- Baby Lasagna
- Bajaga i Instruktori
- Boye former members
- Buč Kesidi
- Nikola Čuturilo "Čutura"
- Deca Loših Muzičara
- Del Arno Band
- Dram
- Dubioza Kolektiv
- Dža ili Bu
- Električni Orgazam
- Eva Braun
- Eyesburn
- Ivan Fece "Firči"
- Generacija 5
- Goblini
- Joker Out
- Kanda, Kodža i Nebojša
- Mile Kekin
- Kerber
- Koikoi
- Dušan Kojić "Koja"
- Nemanja Kojić "Kojot"
- Konstrakta
- Zoran Kostić "Cane"
- Kralj Čačka
- Laibach
- Elvir Laković "Laka"
- Zoran "Kiki" Lesendrić
- Letu Štuke
- Josipa Lisac
- Love Hunters
- Ničim Izazvan
- Obojeni Program
- Orthodox Celts
- Popečitelji
- Ida Prester
- Zoran Predin
- Rambo Amadeus
- Prljavi Inspektor Blaža i Kljunovi
- Ritam Nereda
- Darko Rundek
- S.A.R.S.
- Šajzerbiterlemon
- Damir Urban
- Van Gogh
- Vizelj
- Nikola Vranjković
- YU Grupa

Hip hop and rap artists

- Beogradski Sindikat
- Iskaz
- Marčelo
- Mirela Priselac "Remi"
- Sajsi MC
- Smoke Mardeljano
- Mili

Pop and folk singers and musicians

- Seka Aleksić
- Edita Aradinović
- Nina Badrić
- Filip Baloš
- Luke Black
- Danica Crnogorčević
- Sergej Ćetković
- Tijana Dapčević
- Haris Džinović
- Vesna Đogani
- Vlado Georgiev
- Albina Grčić
- Emina Jahović
- Elena Kitić
- Ksenija Knežević
- Dragan Kojić "Keba"
- Ana Kokić
- Lena Kovačević
- Biljana "Bilja" Krstić
- Iva Lorens
- Marko Louis
- Nucci
- Nenad Manojlović
- Aleksandar Milić "Mili"
- Zejna Murkić
- Nikolija
- Luka Nižetić
- Relja Popović
- Aleksandra Radović
- Džejla Ramović
- Rasta
- Jelena Rozga
- Sara Jo
- Mirza Selimović
- Severina
- SevdahBABY
- Ana Stanić
- Ana Štajdohar
- Milan Topalović "Topalko"
- Voyage
- Bojana Vunturišević
- Sashka Yanx
- Zorja

During the February 2025 Pesma za Evroviziju song contest organized by Radio Television of Serbia to select the Serbian entry for the Eurovision Song Contest 2025, a number of participants, including Ana Ćurčin, Oxajo, Aleksandar Sedlar and Tam, expressed their support for the protests by wearing badges with messages of support or displaying red hands.

===== Athletes and retired athletes =====
- volleyball player Aleksandar Atanasijević
- swimmer Milorad Čavić
- tennis player Novak Djokovic
- volleyball player Vanja Grbić
- swimmer Nađa Higl
- water polo player Danilo Ikodinović
- water polo player Dušan Mandić
- judoka Barbara Matić
- long jumper Ivana Španović
- tennis player Nenad Zimonjić

Basketball players, coaches and staff

- Danilo Anđušić
- Aleksa Avramović
- Miroslav "Mića" Berić
- Bogdan Bogdanović
- Dejan Bodiroga
- Milica Dabović
- Dejan Davidovac
- Vlade Divac
- Predrag Drobnjak
- Aleksandar "Saša" Đorđević
- Marko Gudurić
- Nikola Jović
- Nikola Kalinić
- Tina Krajišnik
- Mathias Lessort
- Vladimir Lučić
- Vanja Marinković
- Jovana Nogić
- Željko Obradović
- Marko Simonović
- Vladimir Štimac
- Ratko Varda
- Rade Zagorac

Football players and coaches

- Saša Ilić
- Aleksandar Jovanović
- Svetozar Marković
- Nemanja Matić
- Savo Milošević
- Bora Milutinović
- Slavoljub Muslin
- Nemanja Vidić

===== Television hosts and journalists =====
- Vesna Dedić
- Ivan Ivanović
- Zoran Kesić
- Olivera Kovačević
- Jovan Memedović
- Branko Stanković
- Nemanja Šarović

===== Religious officials =====
- Irinej Dobrijević
- Grigorije Durić
- Joanikije Mićović
- Ladislav Nemet
- Dimitrije Rađenović
- Justin Stefanović
- Maksim Vasiljević

=== Support from neighboring countries and the Serbian diaspora ===
From mid-December 2024, protests were held by students in Bosnia and Herzegovina, Montenegro, Croatia, Slovenia, North Macedonia and by the Serbian diaspora in numerous cities around the world, including Banja Luka, Bijeljina, Podgorica, Sarajevo, Zagreb, Rijeka, Split, Osijek, Pula, Šibenik, Hvar, Komiža, Skopje, Ljubljana, Maribor, Paris, Marseille, Brussels, Trieste, Milan, Athens, London, Manchester, Cambridge, Dublin, Budapest, Bucharest, Timișoara, Sofia, Vienna, Graz, Berlin, Frankfurt, Hamburg, Dresden, Stuttgart, Aachen, Bonn, Munich, Warsaw, Kraków, Poznań, Wrocław, Zurich, Bern, Basel, Geneva, Lausanne, The Hague, Amsterdam, Rotterdam, Luxembourg, Madrid, Barcelona, Valencia, Alicante, Las Palmas, Lisbon, Porto, Gran Canaria, Prague, Brno, Bratislava, Stockholm, Gothenburg, Oslo, Bergen, Trondheim, Helsinki, Reykjavík, Valletta, Nicosia, Zanzibar City, Mexico City, Washington DC, Boston, Nantucket, Chicago, Miami, Tampa, Detroit, Houston, Austin, Los Angeles, Stanford, California, New York City, San Francisco, San Diego, Pittsburgh, Toronto, Vancouver, Calgary, Montreal, Ottawa, Edmonton, Sydney, Perth, Melbourne, Gold Coast, Auckland, Punta Cana, and Tokyo.

On 2 February 2025, during a protest gathering in front of the Embassy of Serbia in Budapest, an unknown man inside the embassy gave the middle finger to the protesters from the open window. Ambassador Aleksandra Đurović declined to either apologize or reveal the identity of the man.

=== International support ===
Vasilije Čarapić, a Montenegrin politician and member of the ruling Europe Now! party, publicly expressed support for the students, emphasising the importance of regional solidarity and the need for accountability in infrastructure projects, and urging governments to prioritise public safety.

Former president of Georgia Salome Zourabichvili, then a leading figure in the Georgian protests, called the Serbian protests "similar" and called for stronger EU support for the protests in Serbia.

The Renew Europe group in the European Parliament, the European Green Party and the Party of the European Left supported the protests.

On 31 January 2025, it was announced that the students of Serbia had been nominated for the 2025 Nobel Peace Prize.

After the 15 March 2025 protest in Belgrade, 210 academics from Europe, the United States and South America signed a letter of support to Serbian students and academics. The list included Étienne Balibar, Judith Butler, Annie Ernaux, Nancy Fraser, Thomas Piketty and Slavoj Žižek.

==== Public figures, artists and celebrities ====
Other public figures who publicly supported the protests include:

===== Academics =====
- Yanis Varoufakis

===== Actors =====
- Walton Goggins
- Javier Bardem
- Alyssa Milano
- Pedro Pascal
- Rob Stewart

===== Music artists =====
- Damon Albarn
- Azealia Banks
- Gala
- Garbage
- Bob Geldof
- Billy Gould
- Annie Lennox
- Madonna
- Manu Chao
- Ricky Martin
- Massive Attack
- Thievery Corporation

== See also ==
- Accession of Serbia to the European Union
- Russia–Serbia relations
- Gen Z protests
- 2024 Serbian environmental protests
- 2024–2026 Georgian protests
- 2025–2026 Bulgarian protests
- 2026 European unrest
- Flamingo Revolution
