= Student List =

Serbian electoral list

Student List – Students Are Winning Студентска листа – Студенти побеђују Studentska lista – Studenti pobeđuju
- Abbreviation: SL–SP, SL
- Leader: None (Note: The list has no ballot carrier, and the students stated that it has no leader. Ilija Srdanović was the first candidate on the list.)
- Parliamentary group leader: Jovo Bakić
- Deputy leader: Aleksandra Štimac
- Founded: 9 September 2026
- Ideology: Reformism; Anti-corruption
- Political position: Big tent
- Movement: Students in Blockade
- Colours: Carmine
- Slogan: "Students Are Winning" (Студенти побеђују, Studenti pobeđuju)
- National Assembly: 140 / 250

Election symbol

Website
- studenti.org.rs

The Student List (Serbian: Студентска листа, romanized: Studentska lista; abbr. SL) is an electoral list in Serbia formed by the Students in Blockade, the student movement that led the anti-corruption protests following the Novi Sad railway station canopy collapse in November 2024. First announced in May 2025, after the students demanded early elections, their electoral list consisted not of students but of 250 academics, experts, and public figures selected by student plenums. The list won the 2026 Serbian parliamentary election with 53.69% of the vote and 140 of the 250 seats, an absolute majority, according to the final results announced by the Republic Electoral Commission (RIK) on 5 November.

The list ran as the citizens' group Student List – Students Are Winning (Студентска листа – Студенти побеђују, Studentska lista – Studenti pobeđuju), founded on 9 September 2026, the day the election was called, and was proclaimed as number 3 on the ballot. Its programme, the 11-point "Student Plan", centres on the fight against corruption and organised crime, alongside social measures in education, housing and healthcare. Several parliamentary and extra-parliamentary opposition parties withdrew from the election to back the list.

== Background ==
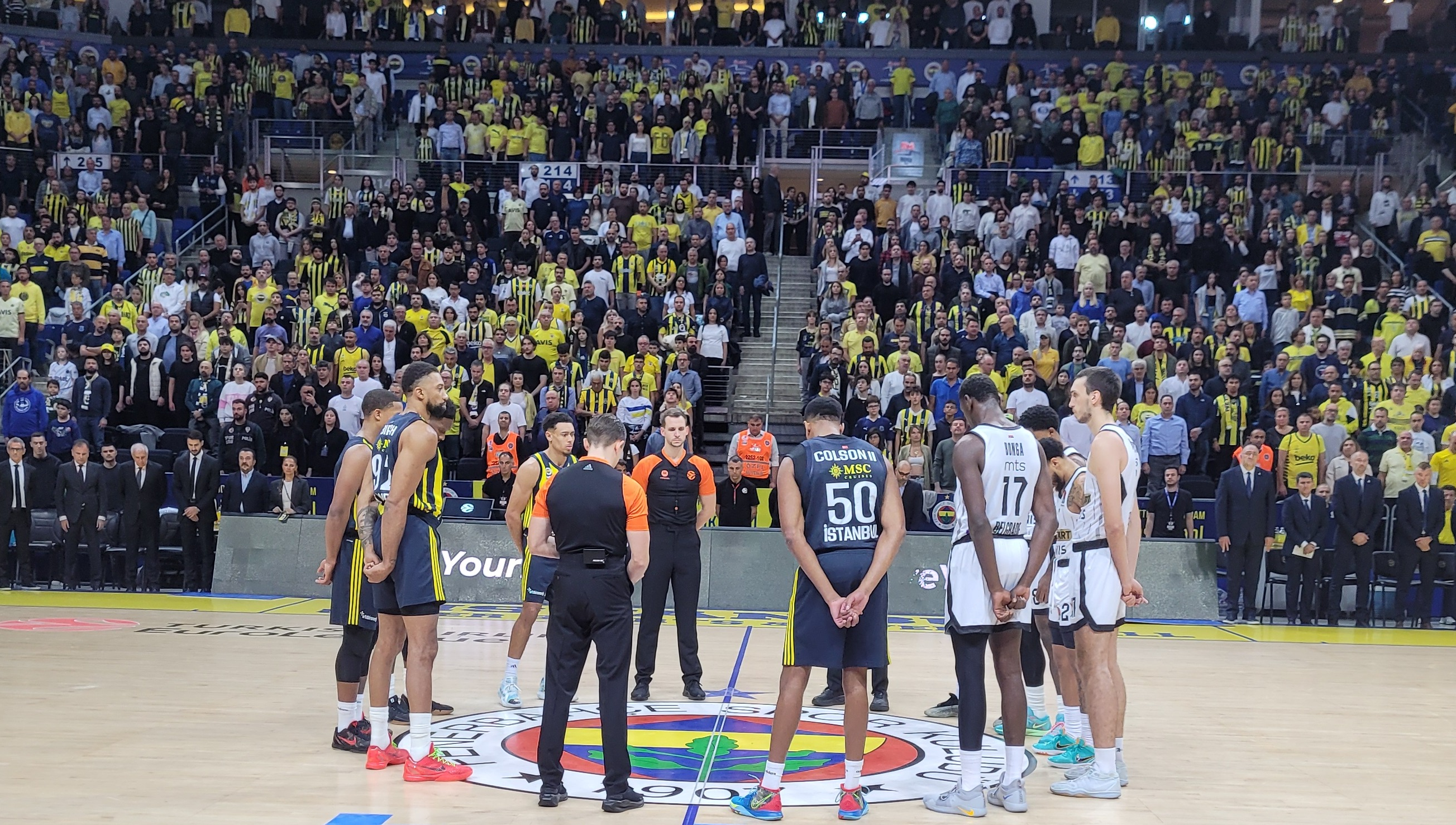
Moment of silence at a basketball game between Fenerbahçe and Partizan, 1 November 2024

On 1 November 2024, the canopy of the Novi Sad railway station collapsed, killing 16 people. This triggered a wave of protests. Students who joined the protests blockaded their faculties with four demands: the publication of all documentation on the canopy's renovation, criminal accountability for those who attacked students of the Faculty of Dramatic Arts during a protest, the dropping of charges against students and demonstrators arrested at the 5 November 2024 protest in Novi Sad, and a 20% increase in university funding. A fifth and sixth demand were added in April 2025. Citing the government's failure to meet their demands, the students called for early parliamentary elections on 5 May 2025.

== Formation ==
"Student Edict" protest in Niš, 1 March 2025

The idea of a separate list was announced in May 2025, shortly after the call for early elections. Amid public debate about how the opposition electorate should be mobilised and whether the students should run jointly with political parties, they said they would form their own independent list, which would not include students as candidates.

=== From protest movement to electoral list ===
In the early phase of the protests, particularly until April 2025, the Students in Blockade stressed that they were not interested in elections or in who held power, and rejected coalitions or mergers with existing opposition parties. Contacts with parties were initially limited to coordinating protest demands and securing the release of detained activists, as the students sought to keep the movement above party politics. As the movement grew, the students came to be seen as the largest opposition force in the country.

Having decided to form their own list, the students entered talks with the opposition from a position of high public support. Rather than seeking places on party lists, they called on opposition parties not to run and to urge their voters to back the Student List instead. Months of talks and pressure, including appeals from the academic community and the civic initiative ProGlas, were accompanied by public disputes, such as a clash between the plenum of the Belgrade Faculty of Law and the New Democratic Party of Serbia. In September 2026, several opposition parties withdrew in favour of the Student List, while those that chose to run did not unite in a single opposition list (see Support).

=== Registration ===
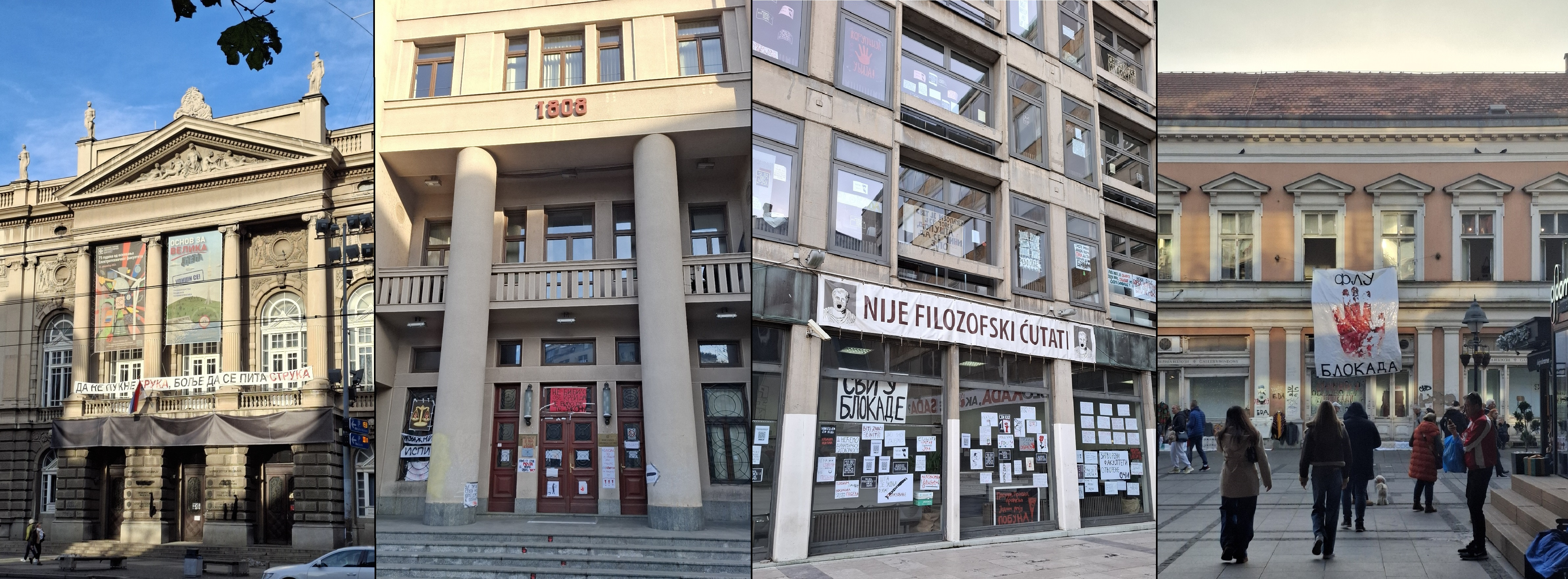
Blockade of Belgrade faculties, January 2025

The association Student List was registered with the Business Registers Agency on 21 May 2026 for a fixed term, valid until 1 May 2028. According to its Statute, it is a voluntary, non-governmental, non-partisan and non-profit association established for a fixed period to raise civic awareness of the importance of democracy and free and fair elections. Its goals include greater youth participation in democratic processes, monitoring elections and referendums, promoting the rule of law and freedom of speech, and holding those who break the law accountable.

The citizens' group Student List – Students Are Winning (SL – SP), through which the list formally contests the election, was founded on 9 September 2026, the day the snap parliamentary election was called. Its founders are:

- Marija Maruna, professor at the Faculty of Architecture in Belgrade
- Katarina Šćepanović, grammar school teacher and representative of the Forum of Belgrade Grammar Schools
- Goran Perišić, worker at the Kolubara mining basin
- Stanislav Milošević, teaching assistant at the Faculty of Mathematics in Belgrade
- Aleksandar Čupić, research associate at the Vinča Institute of Nuclear Sciences
- Miljan Salata, architect
- Milica Jovanović, teaching assistant at the Faculty of Organisational Sciences in Belgrade
- Sanja Fric, assistant professor at the Faculty of Civil Engineering in Belgrade
- Mirjana Nikolić, rector of the University of Arts in Belgrade
- Radomir Saičić, professor at the Faculty of Chemistry in Belgrade and academician
- Dušan Đurđević, professor at the Faculty of Technical Sciences in Priština
- Željko Hubač, dramaturge and journalist
- Maja Crnogorac Đurić, social worker and representative of the organisation Preschool Circle
- Miroslav Andrić, assistant professor at the Faculty of Dentistry in Belgrade

All of the founders are also candidates on the list.

=== Decoy associations ===
Shortly before the citizens' group was founded, three associations with names closely resembling that of the list were registered: "Students Are Winning", "Student List of Serbia – Students Are Winning" and "Student List of Belgrade – Students Are Winning". According to Vreme, all three were founded on 3 September 2026 by the same individual, with identical statutes and the same address in New Belgrade. The students described them as "fake associations" and said they suspected that the government would use them to submit decoy lists bearing the Student List's name, noting that recent changes to the electoral law allowed a single voter to sign in support of more than one list. They stressed that "Student List – Students Are Winning" was their only list.

== Candidates ==
=== Selection ===
According to reports in May 2025, the selection process was to begin with students contacting potential candidates between 8 and 14 May 2025. Candidacies would then be submitted to faculty commissions, and candidates would present themselves to the student plenums and answer students' questions, after which a student electoral commission would hold a vote. The 250 places on the list were to be distributed among the five state universities and the colleges of applied studies roughly in proportion to their size, and the names kept secret until the elections were called.

In June 2025, the students published the conditions for candidates: they had to be adult citizens of Serbia, could not be students, and had to respect the list's programme. Each candidate also had to sign a statement declaring that they had never been a member of the Serbian Progressive Party (SNS), the Socialist Party of Serbia (SPS) or any of 19 other parties named in it, among them the Social Democratic Party of Serbia, PUPS, the Serbian Radical Party, United Serbia and the Serbian Party Oathkeepers; that they had never been an official of a parliamentary opposition party, from member of its presidency or main board to president of a local board; that they had never been an MP, minister or state secretary on behalf of the ruling coalition; that they had never acquired illegal material gain in cooperation with SNS and SPS or by abusing a public office; and that they had no final conviction to more than a year in prison, no conviction for an offence prosecuted ex officio carrying a sentence of more than three years, and no ruling against them by a court of honour. If elected, the candidates pledged to remain in the political organisation that had nominated them and not to change parliamentary group, not to vote for proposals contrary to its programme, and to work towards fulfilling the demands of the Students in Blockade and the goals of their "Social Agreement" and "Programme Minimum"; a candidate found to have made a false declaration or to have breached these pledges would be considered to have resigned on the day this was established.

The student plenums also had the right to veto individual candidates. The secrecy surrounding the list led to extensive speculation throughout 2025 and 2026. Vladan Đokić, rector of the University of Belgrade, was frequently mentioned as a possible head of the list and said he was prepared to take part if the students chose him, but he was vetoed by a narrow majority in the plenums in September 2026. Others excluded from the list included professor Milo Lompar, prosecutor Jasmina Paunović, and activist Predrag Voštinić. The pro-government daily Politika reported that the plenums had vetoed dozens of potential candidates, which it presented as an effort to preserve the list's profile by excluding certain intellectuals and right-wing figures. Other names in media speculation included journalist Žaklina Tatalović and lawyers Zdenko Tomanović and Božo Prelević. In early September 2026, students said the full list of 250 candidates was ready and awaiting only the calling of elections.

=== Composition ===
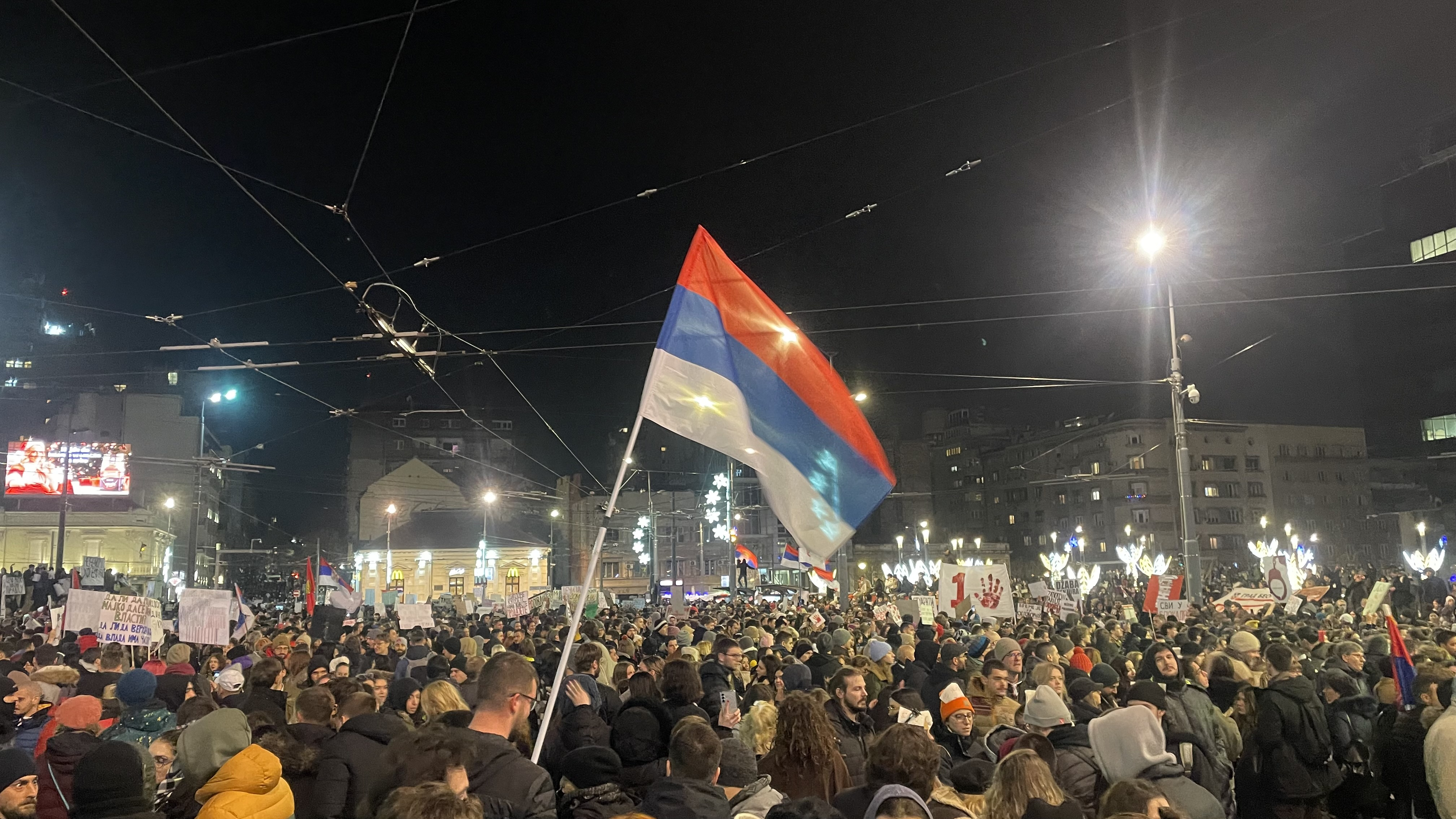
Protest at Slavija Square, 22 December 2024

The movement deliberately avoided appointing a conventional political leader, choosing its candidates through plenums and collective decision-making. The list is headed by cardiologist Ilija Srdanović, a professor at the Faculty of Medicine in Novi Sad, and comprises 250 candidates, mostly academics, experts and public figures, including the 14 founders of the citizens' group. Other prominent candidates include Nemanja Đurić, president of the Judicial Authority Trade Union; professor Ljubica Oparnica; sociologist Jovo Bakić; political scientist Adem Mavrić; actors Tihomir Stanić and Dragan Jovanović; environmental activist Zlatko Kokanović; geologist Zoran Đajić; former basketball player and Euroleague Basketball president Dejan Bodiroga; former National Bank of Serbia governor Dejan Šoškić; and former athlete Mihail Dudaš.

== Campaign ==
The main principles of the students' programme were first presented at the "Slavija – You and Me" rally in Belgrade on 23 May 2026, with more detailed parts to be presented at public forums across Serbia. The campaign formally opened with a rally in Novi Sad on 10 September 2026, attended by around 6,000 people according to the Archive of Public Gatherings, at which the first 30 candidates were presented. Addressing the rally, grammar school teacher Katarina Šćepanović said that it was "the moment for togetherness, for association and solidarity among citizens".

After appealing to citizens in late August to lend premises for signature collection, the students submitted the list to the Republic Electoral Commission (RIK) on 14 September, following a march through central Belgrade, with around 70,000 signatures. The full list of 250 candidates was published on the students' website the same day, with the students stating that the list has no leader. On 15 September, RIK certified 69,099 valid signatures, nearly seven times the legal threshold of 10,000, and proclaimed the list.

The students then presented their programme, the "Student Plan", on a tour of Serbia: in Vojvodina on 15 September, eastern Serbia on 16 September, western Serbia on 17 September, southern Serbia on 18 September, and Belgrade and central Serbia on 19 September.

== Programme ==
The programme was drafted over several months. In November 2025, student Vukašin Đinović said that it was being written in cooperation with experts from various fields, including farmers, doctors, teachers, social workers and cultural workers. During the campaign, some opposition parties and pro-government media called on the students to state their positions on issues such as Kosovo, Republika Srpska, European integration, economic and social policy, and foreign relations.

=== Student Plan ===
The "Student Plan", presented on 15 September 2026, consists of 11 points divided into three sections, "Serbia or the Mafia", "Knowledge is Power" and "Serbia Grows with Us". The fight against crime and corruption is at its centre, alongside social measures such as free school textbooks and cheaper medicines. Its central promise has been described as a broad change in the way Serbia is governed. The 11 points are:

1. Freeing the courts and prosecution through a Special Prosecutorial Police
A vetted police unit to investigate corruption and arrest those responsible without political obstruction, freeing judges and prosecutors from political pressure; a comprehensive review of the Ministry of the Interior, removal of officials linked to organised crime, and dismissal of police officers who broke the law in dealing with protesting students and citizens.
2. Law on the origin and confiscation of illegally acquired assets, and lustration of public officials
Strengthening the Tax Administration to investigate the assets of public officials and return stolen public money to the budget; holding accountable officials who abused their position, engaged in corruption or violated human rights, the Constitution and the law.
3. Full transparency of public procurement and audit of government projects
Publication of all contracts and tenders, strengthening of the State Audit Institution, and audit of non-transparent and overpriced infrastructure projects, with emphasis on secret contracts, lex specialis laws and projects that missed their deadlines.
4. Freeing the media
Unblocking and depoliticising the Regulatory Authority for Electronic Media (REM); freeing RTS; investigating the responsibility of journalists and management of state and private broadcasters for discrimination and hate speech; reallocation of national broadcasting frequencies and a stronger role for the Press Council.
5. Professional employment and departisation of the public sector
Ending party-based employment, introducing strict competitive examinations, appointing proven experts rather than party loyalists to head public enterprises, and introducing strict financial control.
6. Innovation in education and free textbooks
Investment in modern curricula, critical thinking and practical skills; free textbooks for all primary and secondary school pupils, and affordable school trips and extracurricular activities.
7. Knowledge economy and support for domestic entrepreneurs and farmers
Linking universities, institutes and professional associations with industry; grants and subsidies for start-ups, innovation, domestic entrepreneurs and farmers, to move from a cheap-labour model to a high-value economy.
8. Permanent contracts after 12 months
Amending the Labour Law to reduce the maximum duration of fixed-term employment from 24 to 12 months.
9. Ending the import lobby's monopoly and ensuring food security
Tackling import lobbies accused of distorting the relationship between retail prices and production costs; protecting agricultural land and water as national assets guaranteeing food security.
10. Affordable housing for young couples and underfunded professions
Flats with favourable rent and purchase terms, with tax relief for young families and employees in education and healthcare.
11. Affordable medicines and a physician in every village
State control and a sharp reduction in medicine prices, renovation of rural clinics and health centres, and employment of young physicians and medical technicians.

=== Foreign policy ===
According to its programme, the Student List opposes the imposition of sanctions on Russia over the invasion of Ukraine, and supports maintaining cooperation with Russia. It proposes bilateral agreements with individual European Union member states. After the election, the list's leading candidates said that the new government would halt all arms exports from Serbia to areas of military conflict.

==== Israel and Palestine ====
The list's programme states that Serbia will not take part in what it describes as Israel's "systematic attempt to destroy the Palestinian people", and pledges to increase humanitarian aid to Palestine. According to data from the Balkan Investigative Reporting Network (BIRN), Serbian arms exports to Israel had increased around 42-fold since 2023, reaching €114 million by the end of 2025. On 17 September 2026, shortly before resigning as president, Vučić opened a plant in Makiš near Belgrade for assembling drones designed by the Israeli company Elbit Systems; the list's programme does not address the plant's future.

== Support ==
Several opposition parties announced that they would not contest the election themselves and would instead back the Student List.

Parliamentary parties that supported the Student List included:

- Democratic Party
- Movement for the Restoration of the Kingdom of Serbia (part of the party instead ran on the NDSS-led Authentic Right list)
- Green–Left Front
- Movement of Free Citizens (PSG)
- Serbian Renewal Movement
- New Face of Serbia
- Ecological Uprising
- People's Movement of Serbia

Extra-parliamentary organisations that supported the Student List included:

- civic initiative ProGlas
- Initiative for Democratic Socialism
- Movement for Decentralization of Serbia
- Platform for Serbia
- New Party–Experts Should Have A Say
- Kreni-Promeni
- Social Democratic Party
- Dveri
- Enough is Enough
- League of Social Democrats of Vojvodina
- Love, Faith, Hope
- Montenegrin Party
- Vojvodina Hungarian Restart
- Vojvodina Hungarian Plenum
- Democratic Fellowship of Vojvodina Hungarians,
- the Rusyn party Together for Vojvodina
- Roma Party
- Macedonian Party of Serbia
- the Romanian Party, which called on all Romanians in Serbia to vote for the list
- the Party of the Radical Left ("not unconditional")

Several of these decisions followed failed attempts to form a joint opposition list. The PSG said it would run only if the pro-European opposition and the People's Serbia alliance formed a single list; when that did not happen, it withdrew and backed the Student List, with party president Pavle Grbović describing the support as conditional on the list not pursuing policies contrary to European values. The People's Serbia alliance of the People's Movement of Serbia, New Face of Serbia and Ecological Uprising initially submitted its own list, but after several of its local boards defected to the students, it announced on 15 September that it was withdrawing the list and endorsing the Student List. The Party of Freedom and Justice, Serbia Centre and the Solidarity movement (Note: Not to be confused with the original Solidarity platform, which ran within the We Must and Serbia Against Violence coalitions. That organisation expressed its support for the Student List and rebranded itself as the Initiative for Democratic Socialism (IDS).) chose to run separately as the "European Serbia" coalition.

Among Balkan political figures, the Student List was endorsed by former prime minister of Montenegro Zdravko Krivokapić, Kosovo Serb government minister Nenad Rašić and Republika Srpska opposition politician Nebojša Vukanović. Additionally, the expelled deputy leader of the ruling Socialist Party of Serbia, Branko Ružić, publicly supported the Student List.

The list has also received backing from parts of the academic community, including the Network of Academic Solidarity and Engagement (MASA), which urged opposition parties to withdraw their own candidacies in favour of the students, as well as from various other associations.

== Electoral history ==
=== Local elections ===
Before the 2026 parliamentary election, the name "Student List" was used colloquially for local electoral lists backed by the students. In 2025, the students called on local opposition groups to unite for the local elections in Kosjerić and Zaječar on 8 June, and pledged to help monitor the electoral process. The opposition united in Kosjerić, but not in Zaječar, and the ruling coalition won in both municipalities.

In the local elections in Mionica, Negotin and Sečanj on 30 November 2025, students took part more directly, appearing on lists such as United for Mionica, United for Negotin and Voice of Youth that Changes Sečanj. The ruling coalition led by the Serbian Progressive Party won in all three municipalities. On 29 March 2026, local elections were held in ten municipalities, where student-backed lists ran either independently or in coalition with opposition parties. The ruling coalition won in all ten, with the student-backed lists coming second in each.

Municipal elections participation

Local elections
Year	Municipality or city	List name	%	Seats	Status
2025	Kosjerić	United for Kosjerić	48.39	13 / 27	opposition
2025	Mionica	United for Mionica – For a Nicer Face of Mionica	38.93	16 / 39	opposition
2025	Negotin	United for Negotin	26.76	12 / 33	opposition
2025	Sečanj	Voice of Youth that Changes Sečanj	32.7	8 / 23	opposition
2026	Aranđelovac	Students for Aranđelovac – Youth Wins!	46.08	20 / 41	opposition
2026	Bajina Bašta	United for Bajina Bašta (Note: As part of a coalition.)	40.07	19 / 45	opposition
2026	Bor	Bor, Our Responsibility	39.76	15 / 35	opposition
2026	Kladovo	Kladovo Has Us, Time for Change!	26.16	7 / 28	opposition
2026	Knjaževac	Knjaževac with Students – Clean List – Dr Ivan Milošević	32.12	13 / 40	opposition
2026	Kula	Voice of Youth of the Municipality of Kula	47.53	18 / 37	opposition
2026	Lučani	Sound of Justice – Together for Students – Mirjana Kern	32.91	12 / 35	opposition
2026	Majdanpek	Citizens' Group Ne dam – Nu dau	18.9	6 / 31	opposition
2026	Sevojno	United – Sevojno	44.85	9 / 19	opposition
2026	Smederevska Palanka	Youth for Palanka – Alone Against Everyone	28.48	15 / 49	opposition

=== Parliamentary elections ===
In the 2026 Serbian parliamentary election, held on 25 October 2026, the Student List won an absolute majority. RIK's preliminary results of 26 October gave it 140 seats; after the votes cast abroad had been processed, it rose to 141, but fell back to 140 after voting was repeated at 53 polling stations on 1 November, when the "Usame Zukorlić – Movement for Unification" list won a seat. According to the final results announced by RIK on 5 November, the list received 2,354,417 votes (53.69% of the valid votes), while the SNS-led "Aleksandar Vučić – United Serbia" list came second with 1,731,323 votes and 103 seats. Leaders who congratulated the list included Ursula von der Leyen, António Costa and Marta Kos of the European Union, Alain Berset of the Council of Europe, German chancellor Friedrich Merz, French president Emmanuel Macron, Hungarian prime minister Péter Magyar, Croatian prime minister Andrej Plenković, Montenegrin president Jakov Milatović and prime minister Milojko Spajić, and Ukrainian president Volodymyr Zelenskyy.

National Assembly
Year	Popular vote	% of popular vote	#	# of seats	Seat change	Status	Ref.
2026	2,354,417	53.69%	1st	140 / 250	▲140	Government	

== Criticism ==
In an article published by the pro-government daily Politika, journalist Biljana Lukić argued that the list had lost half of its former support and pointed to the idealisation of its leadership and an intolerance of criticism.

Professor Dejan Mirović, who had supported the students during the protests, argued that the list had lost its original character and been taken over by people from the Democratic Party (DS). He claimed that former DS presidents Bojan Pajtić and Dušan Petrović had played a decisive role in shaping it, leading to the exclusion of nationally oriented candidates, particularly from Kosovska Mitrovica. Similar claims were made by pro-government media and by Vučić. Pajtić rejected them as lies, saying that none of his friends, relatives or party colleagues were on the list and that he had learned of its composition from the media.

== See also ==
- Democratic Opposition of Serbia
- Otpor
- Tisza Party
