= Bojana Stefanović =

Bojana Stefanović may refer to:

- Bojana Stefanović (actress)
- Bojana Stefanovic (neuroscientist)
