= Milan Knežević =

Milan Knežević may refer to:

- Milan Knežević (Montenegrin politician)
- Milan Knežević (Serbian politician)
