= Jovo Bakić =

Serbian sociologist and politician (born 1970)

- Јово Бакић
- Bakić in 2015

Member of the National Assembly
- Incumbent
- Assumed office 17 November 2026
- President: Aleksandar Čupić

Personal details
- Born: 23 March 1970 (age 56) Belgrade, SR Serbia, SFR Yugoslavia
- Party: Independent
- Other political affiliations: SKJ (early); LS (2015, affiliated); SDU (2019–2020); PRL (2020–2021); SL (2026–present)
- Education: University of Belgrade (BA, MA, PhD)
- Occupation: Sociologist; university professor; politician

Jovo Bakić (Serbian: Јово Бакић; born 23 March 1970) is a Serbian sociologist, university professor, political activist, and politician who has been a member of the National Assembly and leader of the Student List parliamentary group since November 2026. An associate professor at the Faculty of Philosophy, University of Belgrade, he specialises in political sociology. A figure of the Serbian left, he helped shape the Serbian Left in 2015 and co-founded the Party of the Radical Left in 2020, which he left in 2021. He was a prominent academic supporter of the student-led anti-corruption protests, and was elected to the National Assembly on the Student List in the 2026 Serbian parliamentary election.

== Early life and education ==
Bakić was born in Belgrade in 1970, and has lived in the city since 1985, with interruptions. He was a member of the League of Communists of Yugoslavia (SKJ); appearing on the talk show (Dvo)lični stav, he later said that he was proud of it, adding that "only good students were there". He graduated from the Faculty of Philosophy of the University of Belgrade in 1996. He received his master's degree in 2002 with a thesis on Yugoslav ideologies between the two world wars, and in 2009 defended his doctoral dissertation, "Development of Interpretations of the Process of the Disappearance of Yugoslavia", at the faculty's Department of Sociology. He completed specialisations at the University of Oxford, the University of Helsinki and the University of Massachusetts Amherst.

== Academic career ==
In 1998, Bakić became a teaching assistant in the sociology of politics at the Faculty of Philosophy, and from 2006 to 2014 he was a research associate at the faculty's Institute for Sociological Research. He later became an assistant professor, and was promoted to associate professor in 2019. He also taught at Charles University in Prague as part of the CEEPUS programme. His research interests include the historical sociology of politics, the sociology of knowledge, theories of nation and nationalism, and the former Yugoslavia.

He is the author of three monographs: Ideologies of Yugoslavia: Between Serbian and Croatian Nationalism 1918–1941 (2004), Yugoslavia: Destruction and Its Interpreters (2011) and The European Far Right 1945–2018 (2019), as well as around thirty shorter studies in Serbian, English and German.

== Political career ==
=== Serbian Left and Party of the Radical Left ===
In 2015, Bakić publicly sided with Borko Stefanović in his dispute with the leadership of the Democratic Party (DS). After Stefanović left DS and founded the Serbian Left in December 2015, Bakić wrote most of the new party's original ideological profile. He argued for a left-libertarian movement based on secularism, democracy, anti-capitalism, internationalism and opposition to NATO expansion. He did not join the party, however, after disagreeing with Stefanović over its strategy: Bakić insisted that it should recruit only people who had not previously been active in a major party, while Stefanović said that anyone who accepted the programme should be able to join. Political scientist Vladimir Unkovski-Korica defended Bakić's position, arguing that Stefanović wanted a party "more like the Democratic Party in the United States" than one of Europe's left-wing parties.

Bakić joined the Social Democratic Union (SDU) in 2019, and was the main initiator of its reorganisation, its unification with other minor left-wing, labour and student organisations, and its transformation into the Party of the Radical Left (PRL) in September 2020. He left PRL in March 2021, citing "insults and moral and political lessons" from some members of its leadership. He said that the presidency had objected to his criticism of "Chinese imperialism", that he had been accused of not respecting the party programme in public, and that he had been reproached for alleged antiziganism.

=== Anti-corruption protests ===
During the anti-corruption protests that followed the Novi Sad railway station canopy collapse in November 2024, Bakić became one of the most prominent academic supporters of the student-led movement, speaking at rallies across Serbia. Ahead of the large anti-government rally in Belgrade on Vidovdan 2025, he compared President Aleksandar Vučić to the Ottoman sultan Murad, saying that "Murad must fall on Vidovdan", a remark that the pro-government daily Večernje novosti portrayed as a call for Vučić's death. In 2025, he said that he had received multiple threats after local officials of the Serbian Progressive Party (SNS) published his phone number and address on social media. He said that he would not turn to the police, as "in a hijacked state" he could not seek protection from its institutions, and that he would hold Vučić responsible if anything happened to him. Speaking at a protest organised by the Plenum of Education Workers in Kraljevo in October 2025, he said that the people of Serbia "will not stop until they take the criminals to court, and then to prison".

=== 2026 parliamentary election ===
In September 2026, Bakić was announced as a candidate on the Student List for the snap parliamentary election. He was among the first candidates presented at the rally in Novi Sad on 10 September that opened the list's campaign, where he said that after a student victory, those responsible for the events in Novi Sad and across Serbia should stand trial and, if convicted, end up in Zabela prison. He described his place on the list as "an enormous honour", and acknowledged that he had initially been vetoed by the student plenums before being reinstated, describing the vetoes as part of the students' decision-making process. When the list was submitted to the Republic Electoral Commission in mid-September, he was 76th of its 250 candidates. His candidacy drew strong criticism from pro-government media, which highlighted earlier statements such as his remark that he hated supporters of the ruling SNS "from the bottom of my soul".

The Student List won the election held on 25 October 2026, receiving 53.69% of the valid votes and 140 of the 250 seats according to the final results of the Republic Electoral Commission. In an interview with Croatian Radiotelevision on 27 October, Bakić said that reform of the Ministry of Internal Affairs (MUP) would be "the priority of priorities" for the new government, and that he would accept leading the ministry if the prime minister-designate and the other MPs considered him capable of it. He said that the team was working on identifying "who the professional police officers are and who the criminals in the MUP are", that it planned to bring in proven retired police experts, and that ties between state institutions and organised crime had to be ended. He said that it was still too early to discuss the composition of the government, including media speculation that economist Dejan Šoškić could become prime minister. He also called for an investigation into any links between Vučić and organised crime, and said that some pro-government media were "spiritual poisoners" that should be shut down, with their owners and directors prosecuted. In early November, he said that he was seriously preparing to become minister of internal affairs.

=== National Assembly ===
Bakić was elected to the National Assembly; the mandates were allocated by the Republic Electoral Commission on 6 November 2026, and the 15th convocation of the Assembly held its constitutive session on 17 November. On the same day, he was elected leader of the parliamentary group of the Student List, with Aleksandra Štimac as his deputy.

== Selected works ==
- Bakić, Jovo (1998). "Da li je zapadna javnost u Srbima prepoznala neprijatelja: analiza sadržaja „Tanjug press crvenih biltena" (januar 1991 – decembar 1993)". Sociološki pregled (in Serbian). 32 (1): 3–29. ISSN 0085-6320.
- Bakić, Jovo (2009). "Extreme-right ideology, practice and supporters: case study of the Serbian Radical Party". Journal of Contemporary European Studies. 17 (2): 193–207. ISSN 1478-2804.
- Bakić, Jovo (2010). "Nova Evropa: između prečanskog integralnog i hrvatskog minimalnog jugoslovenstva". In Nedić, Marko; Matović, Vesna (eds.). Nova Evropa: 1920–1941: zbornik radova. Istorija srpske književne periodike (in Serbian). Vol. 21. Belgrade: Institut za književnost i umetnost. pp. 107–122.
