= Zlatić =

Zlatić is a South Slavic surname.

Notable people with the surname include:

- Andrija Zlatić (born 1978), Serbian sport shooter
- Ivan Zlatić (born 1975), Serbian journalist, politician and activist
- Marta Zlatić (born 1977), Croatian neuroscientist
- Savo Zlatić (1912–2007), Croatian physician, politician and chess composer
- Siniša Zlatić, perpetrator of a 2016 mass shooting in Serbia
