= 2025 Serbian local elections =

2025 Local elections in Serbia

- 8 June 2025; 30 November 2025
- Results of 2025 Serbian local elections: We Won't Give Up Serbia

Local elections were held in the city of Zaječar and the municipality of Kosjerić on 8 June 2025. Local elections were also held in the municipalities of Mionica, Negotin and Sečanj on 30 November.

== Background ==
The last local elections in the city of Zaječar and the municipality of Kosjerić took place on 28 March 2021. The majority in Zaječar's City Assembly was formed by Serbian Progressive Party (SNS) and Socialist Party of Serbia (SPS). While in Kosjerić SNS won with 68.78% of the popular vote. These elections are the first elections to take place in Serbia after the ongoing political crisis caused by the Novi Sad railway station canopy collapse and the student protests that followed in.

The protests contributed to stronger citizen organization and the formation of a more serious opposition alternative in local elections, which led to the government intensifying its use of state resources, as well as other forms of electoral manipulation, with strong media support from national media for local government lists. Local elections may also be a test of cooperation between the opposition and students at a higher level, in the event that the government accepts the call of the students in the blockade to call early parliamentary elections. Despite public pressure and reports of irregularities from previous elections, electoral reforms, including the revision of voter lists, have not been implemented, and institutions such as the Anti-Corruption Agency and the REM remain passive.

On 13 April, the President of the National Assembly of Serbia Ana Brnabić announced the local elections on 8 June in Zaječar and Kosjerić.

== Electoral system ==
Local elections in Serbia are held under a proportional representation system. Eligible voters vote for electoral lists, on which the registered candidates are present. An electoral list could be submitted by a registered political party, a coalition of political parties, or a citizens' group. The number of valid signatures needed to be collected to take part in the election varies by the number of eligible voters in that municipality. At least 40 percent of candidates on electoral lists must be female. The electoral list is submitted by its chosen ballot representative, who does not have to be present on its electoral list. An electoral list could be declined, after which those who had submitted can fix the deficiencies in a span of 48 hours, or rejected, if the person is not authorised to nominate candidates. The name and date of the election, the names of the electoral lists and its ballot representatives, and information on how to vote are only present on the voting ballot.

Local electoral commissions and polling boards oversee the election. Seats are allocated with an electoral threshold of 3 percent of all votes cast, however if no electoral list wins 3 percent of all votes cast, then all electoral lists that received votes can participate in the distribution of seats. The seats are distributed by electoral lists in proportion to the number of votes received, while the number of seats belonging to electoral lists is determined by applying the highest quotient system. The seats are distributed by dividing the total number of votes received by the electoral list participating in the distribution of seats by each number from one to the number of councillors the local assembly has. The obtained quotients are classified by size so that the electoral list has as many mandates as it has its quotients among the highest quotients of all the electoral lists participating in the distribution. If two or more electoral lists receive the same quotients on the basis of which the seat is distributed, the electoral list that received the greater number of votes has priority. The seats in the local assemblies are awarded to the candidates in their order on the electoral list, starting with the first candidate from an electoral list. When the councillors of a local assembly are sworn in, they in turn elect the mayor.

An electoral list could be declared the status of an ethnic minority electoral list by the local electoral commission. An ethnic minority electoral list could be only submitted by a registered political party or a coalition of political parties of an ethnic minority. If the percentage of the members of that ethnic minority is less than 50% in that municipality, an electoral list could be then granted the status of an ethnic minority electoral list. If the electoral list receives less than the 3 percent electoral threshold of all votes cast, it would still take part in the distribution of seats. When the distribution of seats takes place, the quotients of ethnic minority electoral lists that won less than 3 percent of the votes are increased by 35 percent.

Any local election, whether it is a municipal or a local assembly election, is called by the president of the National Assembly, who also has to announce its date. To vote, a person has to be a citizen and resident of Serbia and at least 18 years old. A voter could only vote in the municipality of their residence. Election silence begins two days before the scheduled election, during which time no opinion polls, presentation of candidates and their programmes, or invitation to vote in the election could take place.

=== Pre-election composition ===
City Assembly of Zaječar
Party	Seats
SNS	24
Nenad Ristović List	16
SPS—JS	4
Dragana Rašić List	4
Dejan Krstić List	1
Enough is Enough	1

Municipal Assembly of Kosjerić
Party	Seats
SNS	20
Clean People for clean Kosjerić	3
Healthy Serbia	2
NADA	2

Municipal Assembly of Mionica
Party	Seats
SNS	31
Free citizens of Mionica	2
SPS	4
NADA	2

Municipal Assembly of Negotin
Party	Seats
SNS coalition	38
People's Party	6
Greens of Serbia	1

Municipal Assembly of Sečanj
Party	Seats
SNS	14
SPS	6
For a better municipality of Sečanj	2
SRS	1

== Results ==
=== Zaječar ===
Party	Votes	%	Seats
Aleksandar Vučić–We won't give up Serbia (SNS, SDPS, PUPS, JS, PS, SNP, ZS, SRS, NSS, USS, SSZ)	14,199	47.96	27
Change We Believe In – Uglješa Ðuričković – Dragana Rašić (NPS, PSG, SSP, DS, SRCE)	10,312	34.83	19
Citizens' Group: United for Salvation of Zaječar – Miladin Krstić – Mirko Jelenković (NDSS, Dveri, EU, GG DK, GG SMIDT)	2,284	7.71	4
Ivica Dačić – Socialist Party of Serbia – Decisively for Zaječar	896	3.03	0
Citizens' Group: Dr. Nenad Ristović – Responsibly for Zaječar	759	2.56	0
We – Power of the People	591	2.00	0
Serbian liberals – Experts Should Have a Say – Vladimir Kovačević	289	0.98	0
Coalition for Eastern Serbia - Saša Radulović Grljanac	277	0.94	0
Total	29,607	100.00	50
Valid votes	29,607	98.27	
Invalid/blank votes	521	1.73	
Total votes	30,128	100.00	
Registered voters/turnout	47,353	63.62	
Source: City electoral commission

=== Kosjerić ===
Party	Votes	%	Seats
We won't give up Serbia–Aleksandar Vučić (Ivica Dačić–Socialist Party of Serbia–SPS; Rasim Ljajić–Social Democratic Party of Serbia–SDP Serbia; Milan Krkobabić–Party of United Pensioners, Farmers, and Proletarians of Serbia – Solidarity and Justice–PUPS; Aleksandar Vulin–Movement of Socialists–PS; Nenad Popović–Serbian People's Party–SNP; Serbian Progressive Party–SNS–Miloš Vučević)	3,758	50.76	14
Citizens' Group: United for Kosjerić	3,598	48.60	13
Russian Party–Serbia in BRICS–Slobodan Nikolić	48	0.65	–
Total	7,404	100.00	27
Valid votes	7,374	98.41	
Invalid/blank votes	119	1.59	
Total votes	7,493	100.00	
Registered voters/turnout	8,897	84.22	

Incumbent mayor Žarko Đokić of the Serbian Progressive Party was confirmed for a new term in office after the election.

=== Negotin ===
Negotin City Assembly 2025
Party	Votes	%	Seats
Aleksandar Vučić – Best for Negotin! (SNS, SPS, SDPS, PUPS, SRS, JS, PS, SNP, ZS, SSZ, Zeleni, NSS, USS)	11,532	69.28	33
United for Negotin	4,455	26.76	12
Citizens' Group: Serbian Liberals – For Green Negotin	371	2.23	0
Europe and Youth – For Our Negotin	288	1.73	0
Total	16,646	100.00	45
Valid votes	16,646	97.17	
Invalid/blank votes	485	2.83	
Total votes	17,131	100.00	
Registered voters/turnout	35,616	48.10	
Source: Local electoral commission

=== Mionica ===
Mionica Seats
Party	Votes	%	Seats
Aleksandar Vučić – Best for Mionica!	4,157	53.10	22
United for Mionica	3,107	39.69	16
Social Democratic Party of Serbia – Marko Zeman	294	3.76	1
Integrity and Knowledge against Corruption and Crime – Milan Gavrilović Ćićovan	111	1.42	0
Citizens' Group: For Salvation and Renewal of Mionica Villages	94	1.20	0
BUNT – Real Serbia – Dušan Marković	65	0.83	0
Total	7,828	100.00	39
Valid votes	7,828	98.08	
Invalid/blank votes	153	1.92	
Total votes	7,981	100.00	
Registered voters/turnout	10,640	75.01	
Source: Local electoral commission

=== Sečanj ===
Sečanj seats
Party	Votes	%	Seats
Aleksandar Vučić – Best for Sečanj!	4,103	60.45	15
Voice of The Youth Which Changes Sečanj	2,179	32.11	7
Ivica Dačić – Socialist Party of Serbia – For the Municipality of Us All	285	4.20	1
Vukašin Baćina – For a Better Municipality of Sečanj	111	1.64	0
Vojislav Šešelj – Serbian Radical Party	109	1.61	0
Total	6,787	100.00	23
Valid votes	6,787	97.44	
Invalid/blank votes	178	2.56	
Total votes	6,965	100.00	
Registered voters/turnout	10,226	68.11	
Source: Local electoral commission

== Aftermath ==
=== Zaječar ===
About two hours after the polls closed, the Change We Believe In coalition declared victory in the local elections in Zaječar. A little later, Aleksandar Vučić declared the victory of the list We won't give up Serbia. CRTA announced at the end of the day that SNS won the elections in Zaječar, but that 17% of the polling stations had recorded "the most severe forms of irregularities" and that "these results do not reflect the will of the voters". The opposition in Zaječar called for a repeat of the election.

On June 11, the opposition filed 78 complaints (71 by the list "Change We Believe In" and 7 by the list "United for the Salvation of Zaječar") concerning the election process. The City Election Commission (GIK) rejected all complaints from the "Change We Believe In" coalition as incomplete, and on June 14 it dismissed the seven complaints from "United for the Salvation of Zaječar" as unfounded.

However, in unanimous rulings on June 18 and 19, the Higher Court in Zaječar upheld all appeals by the "United for the Salvation of Zaječar" coalition and annulled the Commission's decisions. On June 26, the GIK again rejected the complaints, after which the "Change We Believe In" coalition once more appealed to the Higher Court in Zaječar, demanding that the elections be repeated. The court rejected all appeals on 1 July.

The constitutive session of the city assembly was held on 5 August, at which the decision confirming the mandates of assembly members was adopted. The "Change We Believe In" list appealed this decision, and on August 25, the Higher Court in Zaječar accepted the appeal and annulled the decision on the confirmation of mandates, ruling that it had not been adopted in accordance with the law.

Uglješa Đuričković, the head of the "Change We Believe In" list, stated that this meant the assembly had not been constituted within the legally prescribed period, and therefore the elections would have to be repeated.

At the reconvened session on 24 September, the assembly elected the mayor and confirmed the mandates, but a conflict occurred between opposition councillors and security staff. Đuričković stated that the session had been held 20 days after the legally prescribed deadline, and was therefore unlawful, adding that Zaječar was in a state of "legal chaos."

On 22 October, the Higher Court in Zaječar annulled the decision on the confirmation of mandates made on reconvened session on 24 September. Goran Kalčević from the legal team of "The Change We Believe In" said that the only solution is for the Government of Serbia to introduce a provisional authority, after which new elections should be called within 30 days. Snežana Paunović, Minister of State Administration and Local Self-Government, claimed that there is no basis for introducing a provisional authority in Zaječar despite the fact that court the mandate-confirmation decision and all legal deadlines had passed.

=== Kosjerić ===
About an hour after the closing of the polls, the group of citizens United for Kosjerić declared victory in the local elections in Kosjerić. A little later, Aleksandar Vučić declared the victory of the coalition We won't give up Serbia. CRTA announced that We won't give up Serbia coalition won the elections in Kosjerić by 51 votes, but that due to numerous irregularities, a repeat of the election even at just one polling station could reverse the outcome. The Republic Electoral Commission announced at the end of the day that We won't give up Serbia won.
