= Party of the Radical Left =

Political party in Serbia

Party of the Radical Left Партија радикалне левице Partija radikalne levice
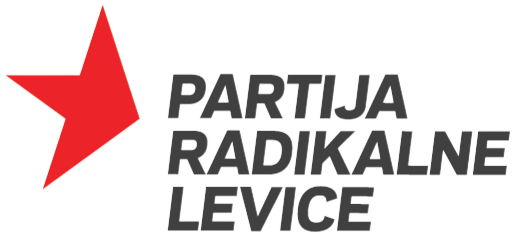
- Abbreviation: PRL
- President: Milena Repajić
- Founder: Ivan Zlatić; Jovo Bakić
- Founded: 7 September 2020
- Preceded by: Social Democratic Union
- Headquarters: Belgrade
- Ideology: Democratic socialism; Anti-capitalism; Left-wing populism
- Political position: Left-wing
- Colours: Red
- National Assembly: 0 / 250
- Assembly of Vojvodina: 0 / 120
- City Assembly of Belgrade: 0 / 110

Website
- prl.org.rs

The Party of the Radical Left (Serbian: Партија радикалне левице, romanized: Partija radikalne levice; abbr. PRL) is a left-wing political party in Serbia. It was founded in September 2020 as the successor to the Social Democratic Union (SDU). The party has no seats in the National Assembly and has not contested a parliamentary election on its own; it backed the Roma Party in 2022 and gave "critical support" to the Student List in 2026.

== History ==
=== Founding ===
The party's establishment was announced in November 2019, but was postponed several times due to technical difficulties and ideological disagreements within the SDU. Its founders included Ivan Zlatić, a political activist and the last president of the SDU, and sociologist Jovo Bakić, a professor at the University of Belgrade. At the SDU's 12th congress in September 2020, the party adopted a new programme and statute, changed its name to the Party of the Radical Left, and elected new party bodies. The congress concluded a process, begun at the SDU's invitation in mid-2018, of bringing together extra-parliamentary left-wing organisations around the SDU. The process continued through joint actions by left-wing organisations and student initiatives from Belgrade and Novi Sad against forced evictions and the construction of small hydropower plants in 2019 and 2020.

=== Since 2021 ===
In March 2021, Bakić resigned from all his positions and left the party. He said that the presidency had objected to his criticism of "Chinese imperialism" and accused him of antiziganism; the presidency said that some of his public statements did not reflect the party programme, while acknowledging his "significant contribution" to its founding.

The party supported the Roma Party in the 2022 general election. Ahead of the 2026 parliamentary election, PRL announced that it would back the Student List, describing its support as "not unconditional, but critical" and stating that the list was "certainly not a left-wing list"; it said that it would neither compete with nor sabotage the list as long as its progressive forces remained active.

== Ideology ==
A left-wing party, PRL supports democratic socialism and anti-capitalism. It has also been described as left-wing populist.

=== Programme ===
PRL was founded as a political initiative of workers, trade unionists, the unemployed and students. Like its predecessor, it regards itself as the moral and ideological heir of Dimitrije Tucović's Serbian Social Democratic Party and of the Yugoslav anti-fascist resistance. Its programme calls for a just economic system, the protection of human and labour rights, and a socialist and secular republic based on equality, solidarity, democracy, internationalism, anti-imperialism, anti-nationalism and anti-fascism, with free health care and education, gender equality and minority rights. The party has positioned itself as an opponent of the government led by the Serbian Progressive Party (SNS), in power since 2012. Its representatives cooperate with minor left-wing organisations in Serbia such as Marks21, and with left-wing parties in neighbouring countries, including the New Left and the Workers' Front from Croatia and The Left from Slovenia, as well as with parties of the European Left, GUE/NGL, Progressive International and Democracy in Europe Movement 2025.

== Electoral performance ==
=== Parliamentary elections ===
National Assembly of Serbia
Year	Popular vote	% of popular vote	# of seats	Seat change	Coalition	Status
2022	Did not participate		0 / 250	0	—	Extra-parliamentary
2026	Did not participate		0 / 250	0	Supported SL	Extra-parliamentary
