= 2026 Serbian local elections =

- 29 March 2026
- Results of 2026 Serbian local elections: Serbia, Our Family

Local elections in Serbia were held on 29 March 2026 in the city of Bor, the city municipality of Sevojno in Užice, and the municipalities of Aranđelovac, Bajina Bašta, Kula, Knjaževac, Kladovo, Majdanpek, Lučani, and Smederevska Palanka.

== Background ==
These local elections are to take place amid the ongoing political crisis caused by the Novi Sad railway station canopy collapse and the student protests that followed.

The last local elections in these municipalities and city were held on 3 April 2022. The President of the National Assembly of Serbia Ana Brnabić announced on 23 February 2026 the local elections to be held on 29 March.

== Electoral system ==
Local elections in Serbia are held under a proportional representation system. Eligible voters vote for electoral lists, on which the registered candidates are present. An electoral list could be submitted by a registered political party, a coalition of political parties, or a citizens' group. The number of valid signatures needed to be collected to take part in the election varies by the number of eligible voters in that municipality. At least 40 percent of candidates on electoral lists must be female. The electoral list is submitted by its chosen ballot representative, who does not have to be present on its electoral list. An electoral list could be declined, after which those who had submitted can fix the deficiencies in a span of 48 hours, or rejected, if the person is not authorised to nominate candidates. The name and date of the election, the names of the electoral lists and its ballot representatives, and information on how to vote are only present on the voting ballot.

Local electoral commissions and polling boards oversee the election. Seats are allocated with an electoral threshold of 3 percent of all votes cast, however if no electoral list wins 3 percent of all votes cast, then all electoral lists that received votes can participate in the distribution of seats. The seats are distributed by electoral lists in proportion to the number of votes received, while the number of seats belonging to electoral lists is determined by applying the highest quotient system. The seats are distributed by dividing the total number of votes received by the electoral list participating in the distribution of seats by each number from one to the number of councillors the local assembly has. The obtained quotients are classified by size so that the electoral list has as many mandates as it has its quotients among the highest quotients of all the electoral lists participating in the distribution. If two or more electoral lists receive the same quotients on the basis of which the seat is distributed, the electoral list that received the greater number of votes has priority. The seats in the local assemblies are awarded to the candidates in their order on the electoral list, starting with the first candidate from an electoral list. When the councillors of a local assembly are sworn in, they in turn elect the mayor.

An electoral list could be declared the status of an ethnic minority electoral list by the local electoral commission. An ethnic minority electoral list could be only submitted by a registered political party or a coalition of political parties of an ethnic minority. If the percentage of the members of that ethnic minority is less than 50% in that municipality, an electoral list could be then granted the status of an ethnic minority electoral list. If the electoral list receives less than the 3 percent electoral threshold of all votes cast, it would still take part in the distribution of seats. When the distribution of seats takes place, the quotients of ethnic minority electoral lists that won less than 3 percent of the votes are increased by 35 percent.

Any local election, whether it is a municipal or a local assembly election, is called by the president of the National Assembly, who also has to announce its date. To vote, a person has to be a citizen and resident of Serbia and at least 18 years old. A voter could only vote in the municipality of their residence. Election silence begins two days before the scheduled election, during which time no opinion polls, presentation of candidates and their programmes, or invitation to vote in the election could take place.

== Results ==
=== Bajina Bašta ===
Party	Votes	%	Seats
Coalition: Aleksandar Vučić–Bajina Bašta, Our Family! (Ivica Dačić–Socialist Party of Serbia–SPS–Serbian Radical Party–SRS–Dr. Vojislav Šešelj–Party of United Pensioners, Farmers, and Proletarians of Serbia – Solidarity and Justice–PUPS – Solidarity and Justice–Milan Krkobabić–Serbian People's Party–SNP–Nenad Popović–Serbian Progressive Party–SNS–Miloš Vučević)	8,467	53.88	26
Coalition United for Bajina Bašta (People's Movement of Serbia, Party of Freedom and Justice, Democratic Party, New Face of Serbia, Serbian Movement Dveri, Serbia Centre SRCE)	6,439	40.97	19
Social Democratic Party of Serbia–Marija Milosavljević	357	2.27	–
Healthy Serbia–Milan Stamatović	284	1.81	–
Citizens' Group: Non-Partisan Movement for Bajina Bašta	99	0.63	–
Citizens' Group: Come Out/Choice for Bajina Bašta–Serbian Liberals	69	0.44	–
Total	15,715	100.00	45
Valid votes	15,715	97.80	
Invalid/blank votes	353	2.20	
Total votes	16,068	100.00	
Registered voters/turnout	21,460	74.87	

When the municipal assembly convened on 12 May 2026, Petar Petrović of the Socialist Party of Serbia was chosen as assembly president and Nebojša Jovanović of the Serbian Progressive Party as vice-president.

Incumbent mayor Milenko Ordagić of the Progressives was confirmed for a new term in office on 22 May 2026. Miloš Ristić, also elected with an endorsement from the Progressives, became deputy mayor on the same day.

=== Bor ===
Coalition SNS-SPS-SRS-SNP won 19 seats, while the list "Bor, our responsibility" won 15 seats and VNS one seat. On the list "Bor, our responsibility" there were some local politicians, movements and organizations supported by Serbian Student Movement. They won at 16 places, most of urban polling stations in Bor. However, coalition between Serbian Progressive Party, Socialist Party of Serbia, Serbian Radical Party and Serbian People's Party secured much better results in rural parts of the city and in villages, which make a difference in final results. During the elections, multiple obstructions and physical attacks on journalists, students, lawyers were documented. Because of that many European movements and political parties criticized the election process. European Democratic Party pointed out that "When violence protects power, elections are no longer free"

Party	Votes	%	Seats
SNS–SPS–SRS–SNP	12,516	49.04	19
Bor, our responsibility	10,331	40.48	15
VNS	1,025	4.02	1
Irena Živković - BB	600	2.35	0
People at the center	423	1.66	0
NDSS–Monarchists	357	1.40	0
Fighters for Bor	271	1.06	0
Total	25,523	100.00	35
Valid votes	25,523	98.24	
Invalid/blank votes	458	1.76	
Total votes	25,981	100.00	
Registered voters/turnout	38,492	67.55	
Source: GIK Bor

=== Užice: Sevojno ===
Party	Votes	%	Seats
Aleksandar Vučić–Sevojno, Our Family! (Ivica Dačić–Socialist Party of Serbia–SPS–Serbian Radical Party–SRS–Dr. Vojislav Šešelj–Party of United Pensioners, Farmers, and Proletarians of Serbia – Solidarity and Justice–PUPS – Solidarity and Justice–Milan Krkobabić–Serbian Party Oathkeepers–Oathkeepers–Milica Đurđević Stamenkovski–Serbian Progressive Party–SNS–Miloš Vučević)	2,108	50.50	9
Citizens' Group: United - Sevojno	1,906	45.66	9
Milan Stamatović–Avram Ilić President of the GO Sevojno Healthy Serbia–May Health Prevail	131	3.14	1
Citizens' Group: Serbian Liberals for Green Sevojno	29	0.69	–
Total	4,174	100.00	19
Valid votes	4,174	98.21	
Invalid/blank votes	76	1.79	
Total votes	4,250	100.00	
Registered voters/turnout	5,545	76.65	

When the assembly convened on 27 April 2026, Boban Perišić of the Serbian Progressive Party was elected as assembly president, defeating Aleksandar Sokić of the United list by a vote of ten to nine. Nenad Ilić of the Socialist Party of Serbia was elected as assembly vice-president with eleven votes. The oldest representative, Žiko Stikić of the United list, was slated to preside over the assembly on an interim basis, but he refused to do so in protest against the Progressives and an election campaign that he described as "undemocratic and illegal." Bogosav Mihailović, also of the United list, served as interim president in his place.

On 19 May 2026, incumbent mayor Mirjana Đurić of the Progressives was confirmed for another term in office. Dušica Živković, the second-ranked candidate on Healthy Serbia's electoral list, was chosen as deputy mayor.
