= The Left of Serbia (2015) =

Political organisation in Serbia (2015–2019)

The Left of Serbia Левица Србије Levica Srbije
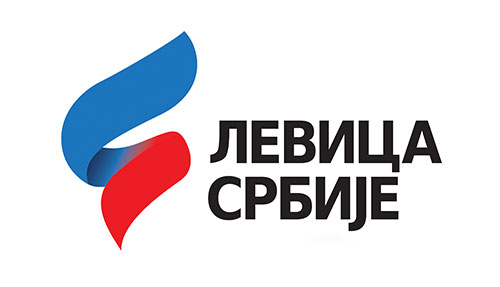
- Abbreviation: LS
- President: Borko Stefanović
- Founder: Borko Stefanović
- Founded: December 2015
- Split from: Democratic Party
- Succeeded by: Party of Freedom and Justice (Note: The Left of Serbia was one of the founding components of the Party of Freedom and Justice in April 2019. Stefanović said afterwards that it would continue to exist as a citizens' association devoted to theoretical work, but would no longer be politically active.)
- Headquarters: Belgrade
- Ideology: Social democracy
- Political position: Centre-left
- National affiliation: Alliance for Serbia (2018–2019)

The Left of Serbia (Serbian: Левица Србије, romanized: Levica Srbije; abbr. LS) was a minor centre-left social democratic political organisation in Serbia. It was founded as a movement in December 2015 by Borko Stefanović after he left the Democratic Party (DS), and was never registered as a political party. It contested the 2016 parliamentary election as a citizens' group and failed to win seats, then backed Dragan Đilas in the 2018 Belgrade election and co-founded the opposition Alliance for Serbia later that year. Stefanović's beating in Kruševac in November 2018 preceded the anti-government protests that began in December. In April 2019, the organisation joined in founding Đilas's Party of Freedom and Justice (SSP), after which it ceased political activity.

== History ==
=== Formation ===
Stefanović, then a vice-president of DS, left the party on 10 December 2015, citing as the "last straw" its nomination in Čukarica of historian Bojan Dimitrijević, who had advocated the rehabilitation of Milan Nedić. He said that he would keep his parliamentary mandate, register the movement "Left of Serbia – Borko Stefanović" in the following days, begin collecting signatures and form a parliamentary group, and that MP Ivan Jovanović would leave the DS parliamentary group with him. According to Radio Free Europe, the programme proposals that Stefanović had unsuccessfully put to DS were largely inspired by that of the Greek Syriza.

Sociologist Jovo Bakić initially took part in the project and wrote most of the organisation's original ideological profile, but left soon afterwards over disagreements with Stefanović on strategy; Bakić favoured an elite party of the left, while Stefanović wanted a mass party. Political scientist Vladimir Unkovski-Korica wrote that Stefanović wanted a party "more like the Democratic Party in the United States" than one of Europe's left-wing parties.

=== 2016 parliamentary election ===
For the 2016 parliamentary election, the Left of Serbia registered as a citizens' group rather than a party, which Stefanović explained by the much lower cost; he said that it would begin the process of forming a party after the election. The Republic Electoral Commission and the Administrative Court rejected its first list because it named the list leader by his nickname; rather than collect 10,000 new signatures to rename the list, Stefanović legally changed his first name from Borislav to Borko. The commission declared the list "Borko Stefanović – Serbia for All of Us" (Borko Stefanović – Srbija za sve nas), submitted by the citizens' group "Left of Serbia – Borko Stefanović", on 8 April 2016. The list, which also included the Movement for Reversal and the Social Democratic Union, won 35,710 votes (0.97%) and failed to cross the electoral threshold. It then filed an objection to the commission's report on the results, alleging vote theft at a polling station in Leposavić and other irregularities, and proposed that the votes from Kosovo and Metohija be recounted or annulled.

=== 2017–2018 ===
In the 2017 Serbian presidential election, the Left of Serbia said that citizens would not make a mistake if they voted for either Saša Janković or Vuk Jeremić. On 23 December 2017, its presidency unanimously endorsed Dragan Đilas as candidate for mayor of Belgrade. In the Belgrade City Assembly election of 4 March 2018, its candidates ran on the list "Dragan Đilas – Belgrade Decides, People Win" together with the Movement of Free Citizens, the People's Party and the Movement for Reversal; the list finished second with 18.93% of the vote and 26 seats.

The Left of Serbia was among the founders of the opposition Alliance for Serbia, formally established at a convention in Belgrade on 2 September 2018 alongside Đilas, the People's Party, DS, Dveri, Healthy Serbia, Together for Serbia, the Movement for Reversal, the Fatherland Movement and the United Trade Unions of Serbia "Sloga".

On 23 November 2018, Stefanović and Left of Serbia activists Boban Jovanović and Marko Dimić were attacked by a group of men armed with metal bars in front of the Rasadnik local community building in Kruševac, where an Alliance for Serbia meeting was to be held; Stefanović suffered head injuries, and three attackers were arrested. The Alliance for Serbia blamed the ruling Serbian Progressive Party and claimed that the attackers were linked to Bratislav Gašić, the head of the Security Intelligence Agency (BIA); Interior Minister Nebojša Stefanović dismissed the claim as nonsensical, while condemning the attack. The attack prompted a protest walk in Kruševac a week later and the "Stop Bloody Shirts" march in Belgrade on 8 December 2018, which marked the start of the anti-government protests.

=== Party of Freedom and Justice ===
On 19 April 2019, the Left of Serbia joined the Green Ecological Party – The Greens and ten movements and individuals in founding the Party of Freedom and Justice, led by former mayor of Belgrade Dragan Đilas. Stefanović was elected deputy president of the new party. A week later, he said that the Left of Serbia would continue to exist as a citizens' association devoted to theoretical work, but would no longer be politically active.

== Electoral history ==
=== Parliamentary elections ===
National Assembly
Year	Leader	Popular vote	% of popular vote	#	# of seats	Seat change	Coalition	Status
2016	Borko Stefanović	35,710	0.97%	9th	0 / 250	–	With PZP–SDU	Extra-parliamentary
