= Vjera Mujović =

Serbian actress

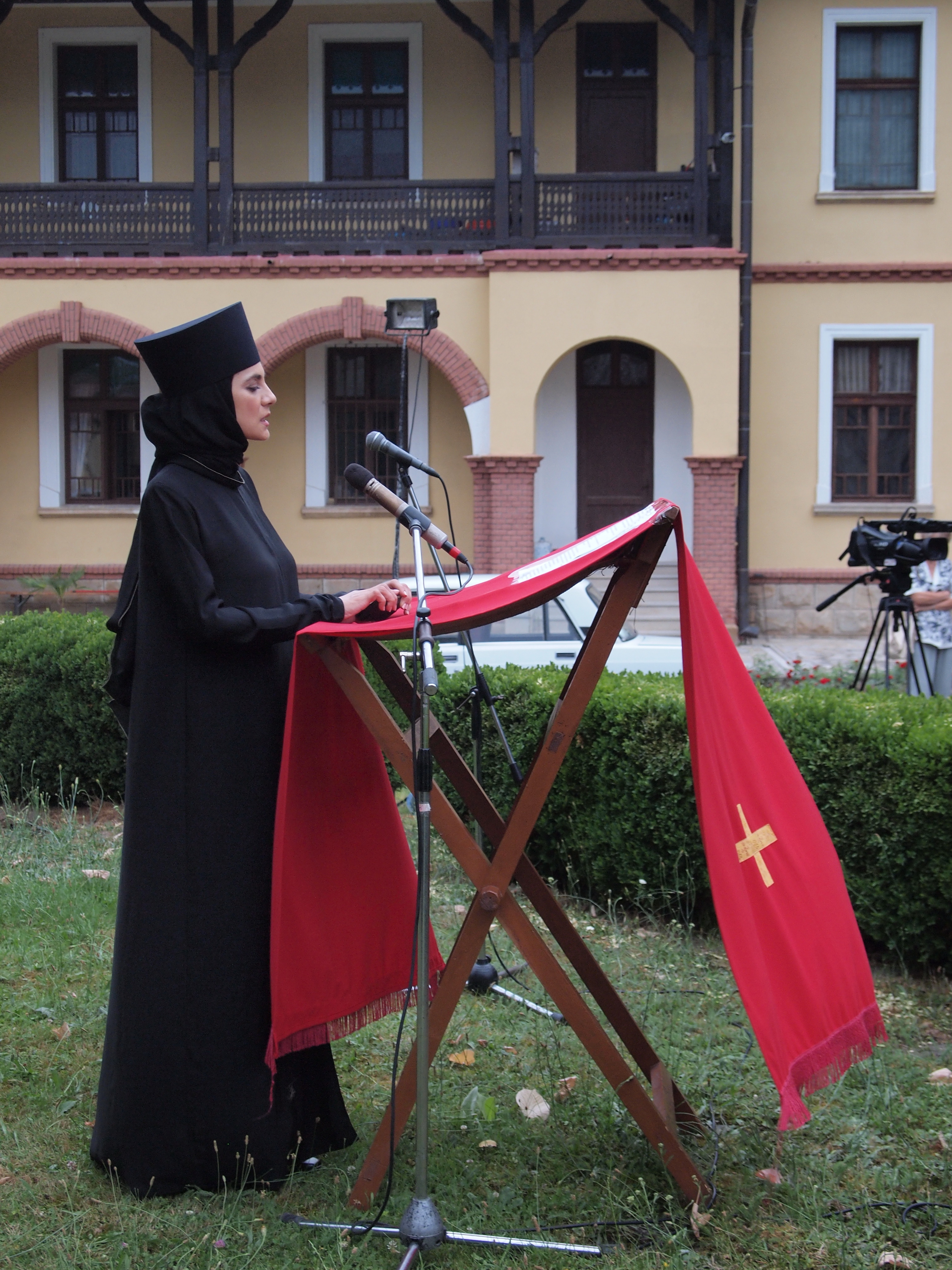
Vjera Mujović

Vjera Mujović (Serbian Cyrillic: Вјера Мујовић, born 8 April 1970) is a Serbian actress. She is known for her work in theatre but also in television. She has also written several books

== Biography ==
Mujović was born on 8 April 1970 in Belgrade, SR Serbia, SFR Yugoslavia and grew up in Titograd, SR Montenegro. Both her parents were pediatricians.

Mujović graduated from the Faculty of Dramatic Arts in Belgrade.

She has appeared in television series and in films. Mujović has worked in theatre and in films across Europe including in Russia, Ukraine, Sweden, and France.

Mujović recorded Viens, mini CD in Serbian and French, and Why, a CD of Russian songs. She has published two books: The Register of Beds, Longings, and Warnings, and a I Haven’t Imagined such a Life, and a theatre play Cherries in Chocolate.

She is the recipient of numerous awards including a Golden Knight in Moscow, and Zvaigzne in Riga (Latvia), awards at the Moscow Festival of Russian classics. She was awarded a doctorate for her treatise on Cultural Diplomacy by Singidunum University in 2019.

Vjera Mujović is an acclaimed actress at the National Theatre in Belgrade.

== Filmography ==
- Baby Doll, short film, D.Varda
- The Esqiman Maiden's Romance, short film
- Gidra, Ginis film, G.Zurli
- Vladimir and Kosara, TV Montenegro, S.Divanovic
- The World, TV Serbia, D.Corkovic
- Julia, TV clip, FRZ Belgrade, M.Pavlovic
- Give me the Truth, Art Channel, Varda
- Two Hours of Good Quality Broadcasting, Third Channel, S. Dragojevic
- Imaginations, ART Channel, D.Varda
- The Originals, TV Montenegro, Z. Nikolic
- Kolibas, BK TV, M.Marinkovic
- Molinos, Lenfilm, M.Bodin
- Good Night, RTS, R.Lukic
- The roofs, the Bombs and Pushkin, TV Kazakhstan, A Scherbakov
- Le Biftec, Noria Film, F. Verreccia
- Spleen, L.Barbieri (best Italian Short Film 2004.)
- Bear in the Big Blue House
- Mina, RTS, V. Nedanovski
- My cousin from countryside, RTS, M.Marinkovic

== Theatre roles ==
She played the role of Sleeping Beauty and in Alice in Wonderland, Janis Wickery, Sonetchka Holiday by Marina Cvetaeva, Mowgli from the Jungle Book, Judith, the Byzantine Princess Yevdokiya to Vladimir Nabokov's Lolita, Lena from Bergman's Autumn Sonata, Aglaya in Dostoevsky's The Idiot, Sylvia Plath and Madame de Tourvel in Dangerous Liasiouns.

== Publications ==
- Cultural Diplomacy in the Service of Serbia, published by the Institute for Political Studies Belgrade, 2020 (367pp) (ISBN 978-86-7419-323-5) (her doctoral dissertation of May 2019 at the Faculty of Media and Communications, Singidunum University, Belgrade, Serbia).
