= Ivan Zlatić =

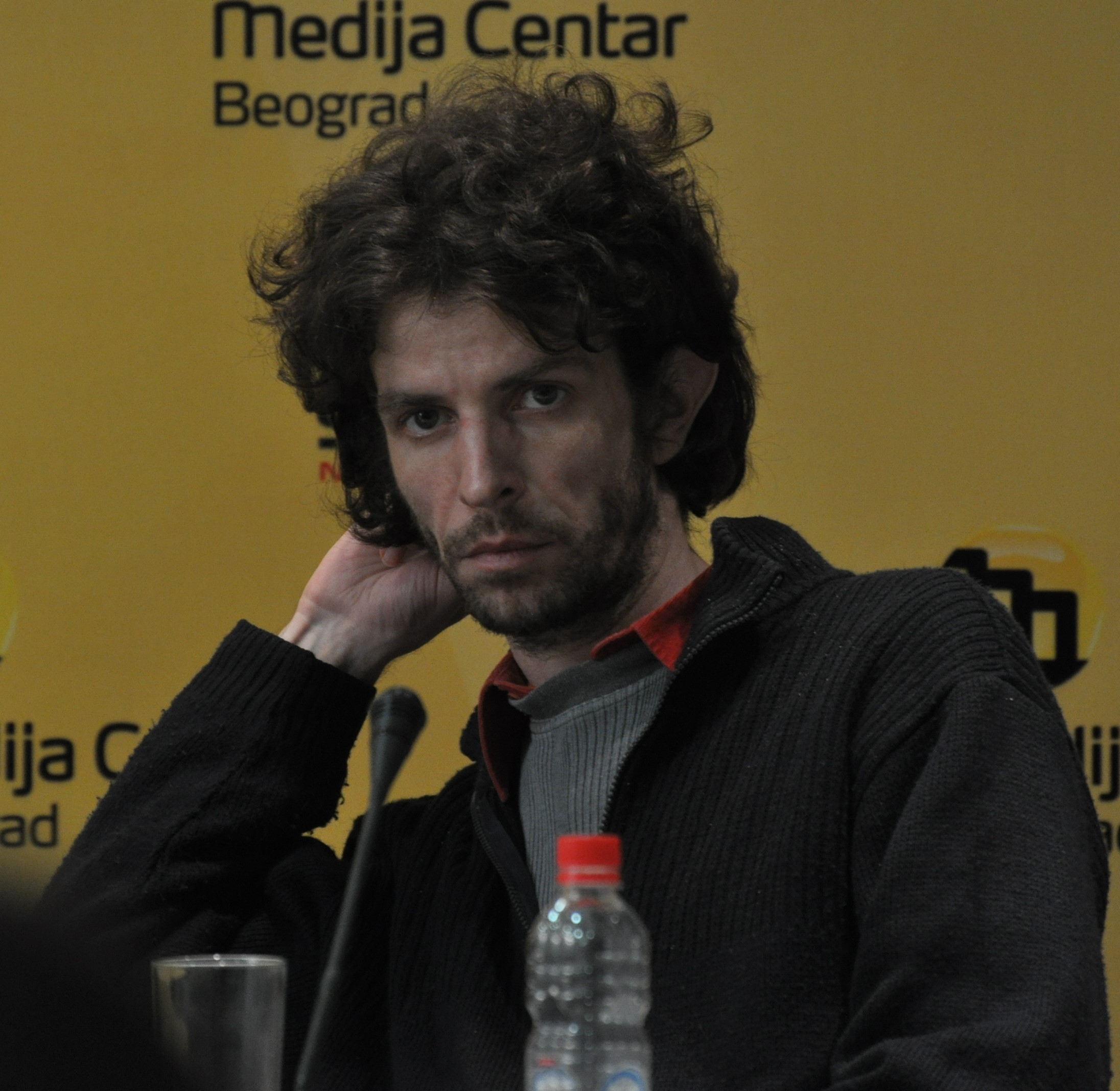
Zlatić in 2011

Ivan Zlatić (Serbian Cyrillic: Иван Златић, born 1975 in Čačak, SR Serbia, SFRY) is a Serbian journalist, politician and activist, who is currently a member of the presidency of the left-wing Party of the Radical Left (PRL).

From 2003 to 2012, he was the Secretary of the Anti-Corruption Council, from 1999 until 2012. Zlatić was a member of the editorial board of the magazine Republika, and the Balkan edition of Z magazine until 2009. He was editor of the Bulletin for Self-Education and Social Affairs, published by newspaper Danas, since June 2012. He is one of the initiators and a member of the governing bodies of the Union of Labour and Shareholders of Serbia, the Equality Movement and the Coordination Board of Workers' Protests in Serbia. In October 2016, he was elected president of the Social Democratic Union.

After he took the lead in the SDU, the party increasingly employed a more significant leftist, democratic socialist and eco-socialist discourse, modeled on other European leftist and green-left parties, as well regarding party as the moral and ideological heir of the historical left-wing Serbian Social Democratic Party of Dimitrije Tucović. Since 2016 the SDU maintains cooperation with orher left-wing organizations and initiatives in Serbia, such as Do not let Belgrade d(r)own and Marks21, as well as some leftist parties from the neighboring countries, including the New Left and Workers' Front from Croatia and The Left from Slovenia, as well with the other European Left parties and DieM25 of Yanis Varoufakis. During 2018, the SDU leadership started an initiative of gathering other minor leftist organizations around the Party, through joint actions of various Serbian leftist organizations and student initiatives from Belgrade and Novi Sad, against violent evictions, as well against the construction of mini-hydro power plants, which continued during 2019 and 2020. In September 2020 Party merged into the Party of the Radical Left, Zlatić was elected a member of presidency of the new party.
