= Bojana Stefanovic (neuroscientist) =

Canadian neuroscientist

Academic background
- Education: B.A.Sc., electrical engineering, University of British Columbia; PhD, 2005, McGill University
- Thesis: Functional magnetic resonance imaging of cerebral blood volume. (2005)
- Website: brainimaginglab.com

Bojana Stefanovic is a Canadian neuroscientist. She is a senior scientist at the Sunnybrook Health Sciences Centre and Tier 1 Canada Research Chair in Functional Brain Neuroimaging at the University of Toronto.

== Early life and education ==
Stefanovic was raised in British Columbia where she attended Magee Secondary School. She completed her Bachelor of Arts and Bachelor of Science combined degree at the University of British Columbia (UBC) where she received their Association of Professional Engineers and Geoscientists Gold Medal for having the most outstanding record in the graduating class. Following UBC, Stefanovic enrolled at McGill University in Quebec for her PhD.

== Career ==
Upon completing her doctorate degree, Stefanovic finished a postdoctoral fellowship at the National Institute of Neurological Disorders and Stroke before joining Sunnybrook Health Sciences Centre in October 2007. As an imaging scientist in Sunnybrook's brain sciences research program, Stefanovic received the 2010 Canadian Institutes of Health Research New Investigator Award. Throughout her career, Stefanovic studied the development of novel, quantitative magnetic resonance imaging-based techniques for human brain function imaging. In 2019, she was awarded a Tier 1 Canada Research Chair in Functional Brain Neuroimaging at the University of Toronto (U of T). Following this, Stefanovic was promoted to the rank of Full professor at U of T and named the Platform Director of Physical Sciences at Sunnybrook.
