= Džejla Ramović =

Bosnian pop singer (born 2002)

- Born: 29 April 2002 (age 24); Goražde, Bosnia and Herzegovina
- Genres: Pop
- Occupation: Singer
- Instruments: Vocals; piano
- Years active: 2014–present
- Label: Grand Production

Džejla Ramović (born 29 April 2002) is a Bosnian solo singer. She rose to fame as the winner of the first season of the Serbian talent show Neki Novi Klinci (lit. 'Some New Kids'). In 2019, she won the thirteenth season of musical competition Zvezde Granda.

== Biography ==
After successfully applying for audition in the Serbian variety show Neki Novi Klinci, Ramović soon gained recognition in the media and went on to enjoy great popularity. Her singing voice has been widely described as melodic and sensitive, leading the judges of the show to choose her as the winner.

Ramović began making music in 2014. Whilst being busy with school and other responsibilities, she eventually found time to make cover songs, including "Hello" by Adele. On 18 January 2017, Ramović released her first single entitled Ruža (lit. 'Rose'), the lyrics of which were written by Bane Opačić with the arrangement by Alek Aleksov. She is fluent in English.

== Discography ==
=== Singles ===
Title	Year	Peak chart positions	Album
Title	Year	CRO Billb.	Album
Ruža	2017	(Note: Croatia Songs was launched on 15 February 2022.)	Single
Potraži me	2017	(Note: Croatia Songs was launched on 15 February 2022.)	Single
Jedna kao nijedna	2018	(Note: Croatia Songs was launched on 15 February 2022.)	Single
Ruine	2019	(Note: Croatia Songs was launched on 15 February 2022.)	Single
Ginem	2020	(Note: Croatia Songs was launched on 15 February 2022.)	Single
Sparta	2022	—	Single
Kazamat	2023	—	Single
Rizik ft. Henny	2023	3	Single
Tajna veza ft. Henny	2024	19	Single
Zime ft. Albino	2025	—	Single
Bol	2025	—	Single
1004	2026		Single
