= Social Democratic Union (Serbia) =

Former centre-left political party in Serbia

Social Democratic Union Социјалдемократска унија Socijaldemokratska unija
- Abbreviation: SDU
- Last president: Ivan Zlatić
- Founder: Žarko Korać
- Founded: 13 May 1996 (re-founded 29 March 2003)
- Dissolved: 7 September 2020
- Split from: Civic Alliance of Serbia
- Succeeded by: Party of the Radical Left
- Headquarters: Belgrade
- Ideology: Social democracy
- Political position: Centre-left

The Social Democratic Union (Serbian: Социјалдемократска унија, romanized: Socijaldemokratska unija; abbr. SDU) was a minor social democratic and left-wing political party in Serbia. Founded in 1996 by Žarko Korać as a split from the Civic Alliance of Serbia, it took part in the Democratic Opposition of Serbia and later ran in coalition with the Democratic Party and the Liberal Democratic Party. In September 2020, it was transformed into the Party of the Radical Left.

== History ==
=== 1996–2003 ===
The Social Democratic Union was registered on 13 May 1996. It was founded by former members of the Civic Alliance of Serbia, led by Korać, who opposed forming a coalition with the right-wing Serbian Renewal Movement for the 1996 federal election. As part of the Democratic Opposition of Serbia (DOS), it won four seats in the 2000 parliamentary election and joined the government. On 21 April 2002, the SDU merged with Social Democracy (SD) to form the Social Democratic Party (SDP).

A year later, disenchanted members of the SDP, led by Korać, left and re-founded the SDU on 29 March 2003. According to SDP spokesperson Ljiljana Nestorović, this was because almost all local boards supported co-president Slobodan Orlić, the former leader of SD, ahead of the party congress due to be held less than 20 days later.

=== 2003–2020 ===
The SDU ran with the Democratic Party (DS) in the 2003 parliamentary election, and with the Liberal Democratic Party (LDP) in the 2007 and 2008 elections and as part of the U-Turn alliance in 2012, winning one seat each time. In the 2014 election, it again ran on the LDP-led list, which won 3.36% of the vote and failed to cross the 5% threshold. At its 8th congress in June 2014, Korać stepped down and Miloš Adamović was elected president.

In the 2016 election, the SDU ran together with the Serbian Left and the Movement for Reversal, and failed to cross the threshold. At its 9th congress on 15 October 2016, Ivan Zlatić was elected president. In the 2018 Belgrade City Assembly election, it was part of the Do not let Belgrade d(r)own list, which won 3.44% of the vote and failed to cross the threshold. At its 12th congress in September 2020, the SDU was transformed into the Party of the Radical Left.

== Electoral results ==
=== Parliamentary elections ===
National Assembly
Year	Popular vote	% of popular vote	# of seats	Seat change	Coalition	Status
1997	Election boycott		0 / 250	Steady	–	Extra-parliamentary
2000	2,402,387	64.09%	4 / 250	▲4	DOS	Government
2003	481,249	12.58%	1 / 250	▼3	With DS–GSS–DC–LZS	Opposition
2007	214,262	5.31%	1 / 250	0	With LDP–GSS–LSV–DHSS	Opposition
2008	216,902	5.24%	1 / 250	0	With LDP–DHSS	Opposition
2012	255,546	6.53%	1 / 250	0	U-Turn	Opposition
2014	120,879	3.36%	0 / 250	▼1	With LDP–BDZS	Extra-parliamentary
2016	35,710	0.94%	0 / 250	0	With LS–PZP	Extra-parliamentary
2020	Election boycott		0 / 250	0	–	Extra-parliamentary

== See also ==
- Serbian Social Democratic Party (Kingdom of Serbia)
