= Sonja Atanasijević =

Serbian prose author

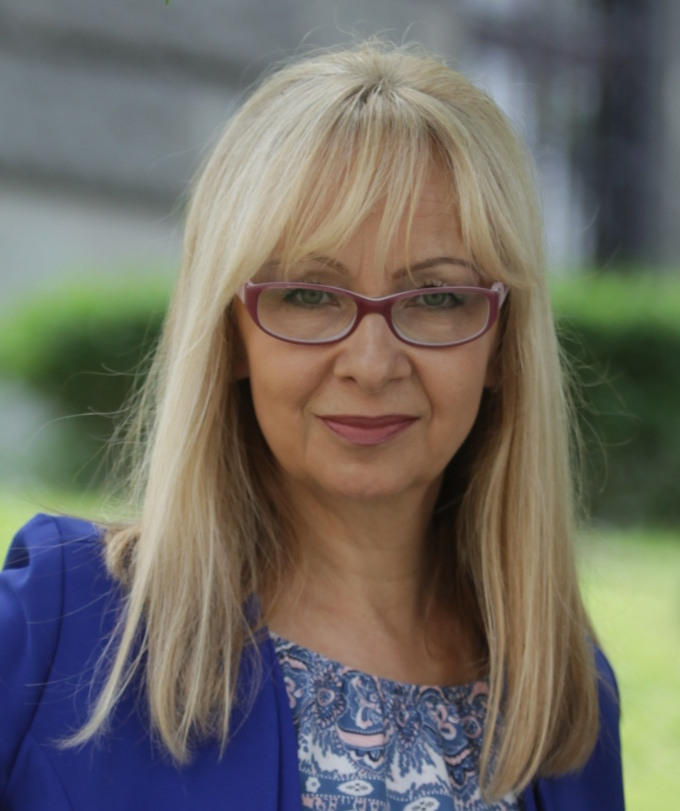
- Atanasijević, Serbian prose author
- Born: 1962 (age 63–64); Belgrade, Federal People's Republic of Yugoslavia
- Occupations: Poet and writer
- Writing career
- Period: 1995–present
- Genre: prose

Sonja Atanasijević (Serbian Cyrillic: Соња Атанасијевић) (born in 1962) is a Serbian prose author and journalist, lives in Belgrade.

== Published works ==
=== Novels ===
- Oni su ostali, (They Remained) 1995.
- Crveni krug, (Red Circle) 1997, 2007.
- Bekstvo iz akvarijuma, (Escape from the Aquarium) 2003, 2005.
- Narandže za Božanu, (Oranges for Bozana) 2004, 2005.
- Ko je ubio Alfija, (Who Killed Alfi) 2009.
- Vazdušni ljudi, (Air People) 2013, 2014.
- Velika laž, (The Great Lie) 2016.
- Spavaj, zveri moja (Sleep, My Beast) 2020.
- Veštice iz Ilinaca (Witches from Ilinci), 2023.

=== Story collections ===
- Krilata tuga, (Winged Sadness) 2005.

Her novels Escape from the Aquarium and Oranges for Bozana won the prize Zlatni hit liber from Radio Television of Serbia. The novel Air People won the prize Branko Copic from Serbian Academy of Sciences and Arts.
