= Milan Knežević (Serbian politician) =

Politician, academic, and medical doctor in Serbia

Milan Knežević (Serbian Cyrillic: Милан Кнежевић; born March 9, 1952) is a politician, academic, and medical doctor in Serbia. He has served in the National Assembly of Serbia since 2008, initially as a member of the Serbian Radical Party and since October 2008 with the Serbian Progressive Party.

== Early life and private career ==
Knežević was born in Kragujevac, then part of the People's Republic of Serbia in the Federal People's Republic of Yugoslavia. He graduated from the University of Belgrade Faculty of Medicine in 1977 and subsequently received a master's degree (1984) and a Ph.D. (1987) from the same institution. He is a regular professor of Pathology at the Faculty of Medicine in Kragujevac and the head of the department of pathological anatomical diagnostics at the community's Clinical Centre.

== Parliamentarian ==
Knežević first entered the National Assembly following the 2008 Serbian parliamentary election, in which he received the thirty-seventh position on the electoral list of the Serbian Radical Party. The Radicals won seventy-eight seats, and Knežević was subsequently chosen as part of the party's delegation to the assembly. (From 2000 to 2011, Serbian parliamentary mandates were awarded to sponsoring parties or coalitions rather than to individual candidates, and it was common practice for mandates to be awarded out of numerical order. Knežević did not automatically receive a mandate by virtue of his position on the list, though he was selected for the party's delegation all the same.) Boris Tadić's For a European Serbia coalition formed government after the election, and the Radicals served in opposition.

The Radical Party split in late 2008, and Knežević became part of a group of twenty-one parliamentarians that formed the breakaway Serbian Progressive Party under Tomislav Nikolić's leadership.

Serbia's electoral system was reformed in 2011, such that parliamentary mandates were awarded in numerical order to candidates on successful lists. In the 2012 parliamentary election, Knežević received the fifty-fifth position on the Progressive Party's Let's Get Serbia Moving alliance list and was re-elected when the list won seventy-three mandates. The Progressive Party subsequently became the dominant party in a coalition government, and Knežević served as part of its parliamentary majority. He was re-elected in the elections of 2014 and 2016, both of which saw the Progressives their allies win majority victories.

Knežević is a member of the assembly's health and family committee; a deputy member of its committee on education, science, technological development, and the information society; the head of Serbia's parliamentary friendship group with Lithuania; and a member of its parliamentary friendship groups with Belarus, Canada, Greece, Kazakhstan, Russia, and Tunisia.
