= Bojana Stefanović (actress) =

Serbian actress

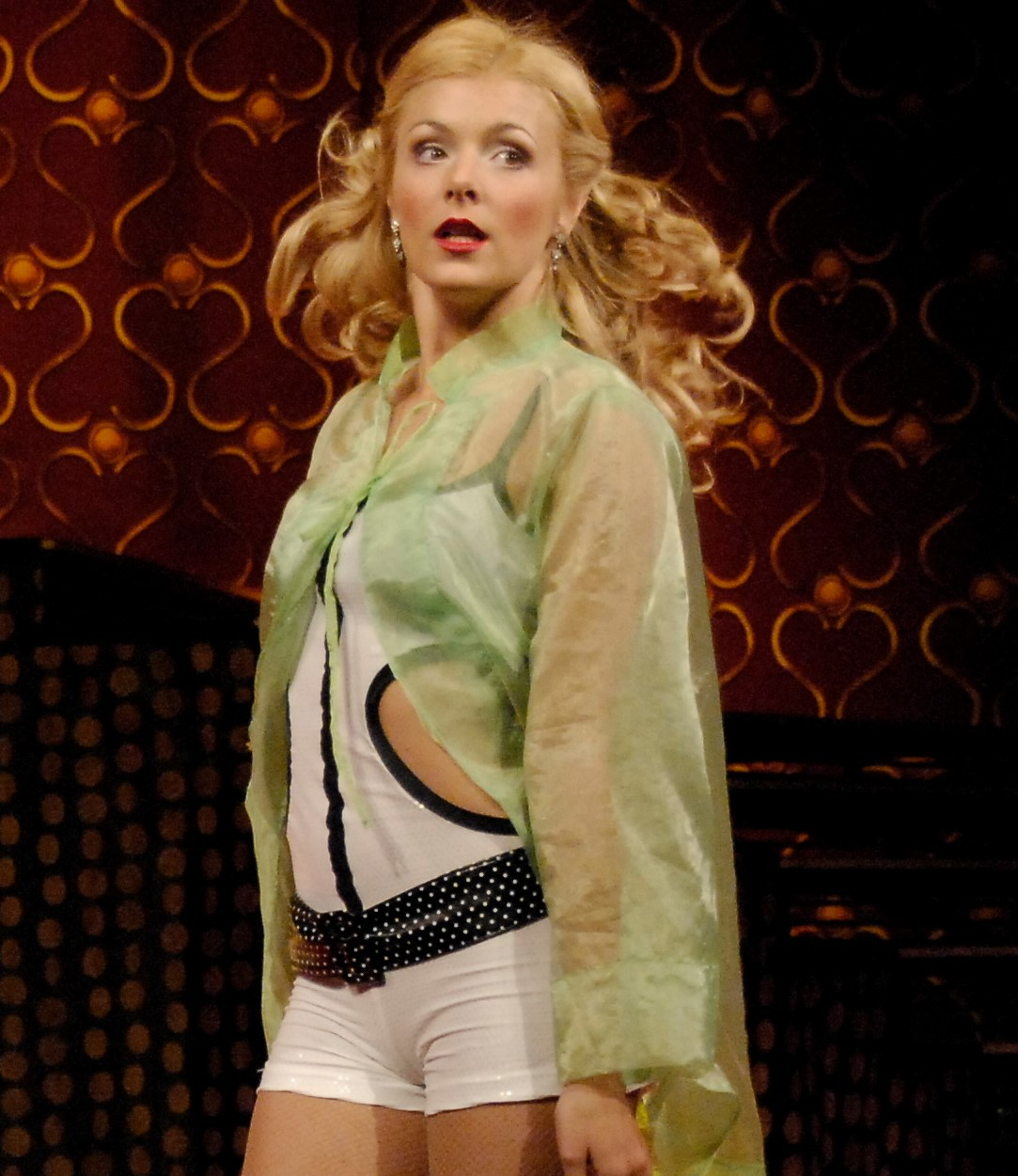
- Born: 4 March 1980 (age 46); Belgrade, Serbia
- Occupation: Actress
- Spouse: Istok Tornjanski
- Children: 2

Bojana Stefanović (Serbian: Бојана Стефановић) is a Serbian actress. She is best known for her role as Nadja in the series Ono kao ljubav (Thing as love). She is married to Serbian director Istok Tornjanski with whom she has a son and a daughter.
