= Timeline of the 2024–2026 Serbian anti-corruption protests =

Overview and chronological index of the 2024–2026 anti-corruption protests in Serbia

This is a timeline of the 2024–2026 Serbian anti-corruption protests, a series of mass demonstrations, university blockades, and civil disobedience actions across Serbia. The protests began in November 2024 following the Novi Sad railway station canopy collapse, which killed 16 people, and evolved into a nationwide movement demanding institutional accountability, transparency, and early parliamentary elections.

Due to the length and scope of the demonstrations, the detailed daily chronology is divided into four sub-articles covering distinct phases of the movement.

== Overview by period ==
Period	Sub-article	Key developments
November – December 2024	Timeline of the 2024-2026 Serbian anti-corruption protests (November-December 2024)	Outbreak of protests in Novi Sad and Belgrade; initiation of the daily Zastani, Srbijo 15-minute silent vigils; start of university faculty blockades by Students in Blockade; mass rally at Slavija Square on 22 December.
January – August 2025	Timeline of the 2024–2026 Serbian anti-corruption protests (January–June 2025)	Expansion of university and high school blockades; 24-hour blockade of Autokomanda; intercity student marches to Novi Sad, Kragujevac, Niš, and Belgrade; two-week blockade of RTS and RTV in April; formal demand for snap parliamentary elections in May.
August – December 2025	Timeline of the 2024-2026 Serbian anti-corruption protests (August–December 2025)	End of physical university blockades in September; prolonged protests at Belgrade and Novi Sad gymnasiums; multi-day blockade outside the Generalštab complex; internal vetting and drafting of the Student List platform.
January – November 2026	Timeline of the 2024-2026 Serbian anti-corruption protests (January–November 2026)	Pre-election marches from four directions converging on Belgrade; final Slavija rally; campaigning and victory of the Student List in the 2026 Serbian parliamentary election.

== Phase summaries ==
=== November – December 2024 ===
Protests began in Novi Sad on 3 November 2024, two days after the concrete canopy of the recently renovated main railway station collapsed. Demonstrators initially focused on criminal and political responsibility for the tragedy. By late November, students at the Faculty of Dramatic Arts in Belgrade initiated physical blockades after being attacked during a silent tribute, sparking a wave of faculty occupations across all state universities in Serbia. The period culminated in a massive student-led gathering at Slavija Square in Belgrade on 22 December 2024.

=== January – August 2025 ===
In early 2025, the movement expanded to include secondary schools, teachers' unions, farmers, and bar associations. Students organized major blockades of key traffic hubs, including a 24-hour blockade of Autokomanda in January, alongside multi-day relay marches between major university centers. In April 2025, demonstrators blockaded the headquarters of public broadcasters RTS and RTV for two weeks over editorial bias. On 5 May 2025, stating that state institutions had failed to meet their demands, the student movement formally called for snap parliamentary elections.

=== August – December 2025 ===
In September 2025, university plenums ended physical occupations of faculty buildings to allow the completion of the delayed academic year, shifting focus toward street actions, institutional pressure, and political organization. Protests continued outside the Generalštab complex in Belgrade against its planned redevelopment, as well as in several high schools over administrative retaliation against teachers. During this period, student plenums finalized their policy platform and conducted internal vetting for candidates on the Student List.

=== January – November 2026 ===
Throughout 2026, demonstrations merged with the campaign for the 2026 Serbian parliamentary election. Ahead of the vote, four columns of marching students converged on Belgrade from the north, south, east, and west for a final mass rally at Slavija Square. The movement's political articulation culminated in the parliamentary election, where the Student List emerged victorious.

== See also ==
- 2024–2026 Serbian anti-corruption protests
- Student List
- Novi Sad railway station canopy collapse
- 2026 Serbian parliamentary election
