= Timeline of the 2024–2026 Serbian anti-corruption protests (January–June 2025) =

The period between January and June 2025 in the 2024-2026 Serbian anti-corruption protests was one of high tensions, marked by many controversial takes by government officials and protests in over 400 cities. During this period the organized students started practicing longer blockades of important motorways, marches between cities to raise awareness and calling upon citizens to join strikes. February also marks the start of high schooler involvement in the protests caused partially by SNS-appointed principals making moves against their own pupils. In response, they started organizing protests of their own and occasionally participated in joint actions with the students. This period saw support for the students come in from various professions in the public and private sectors. The students also invited citizens to organize into "zbors", informal groups of citizens with a power structure similar to that of the students' own plenums. These groups will later go on to play on a role in organizing protests and other actions in many cities.

The pro-governemtn Ćaciland camp was formed during this time, officially calling themselves "Students who want to study" or alternatively "Students 2.0". During key protests this camp served as a safe place for pro-government protestors and was heavily guarded by the police. In October 2026 an alleged member of the camp came out claiming he was tasked with organizing pro-government protestors, they were allegedly armed, paid several hundred euros per day and were consciously protected by the police. He also alleges that the money came out of the country's budget, through public companies, and that he "likely carried out over 500 thousand euros in cash over the last 2 years" out of JP "Toplane", Novi Sad, a city heating utility.

== Timeline of Events ==
=== January 2025 ===
On 2 January, the 15 minutes of silence were extended to 29: an additional 12 for the people killed in 2025 Cetinje shootings in Montenegro on 31 December, and two for the victims killed in Arilje on 1 January. The action was repeated on 3 January in Novi Sad at the blockade of the Varadin Bridge and in other cities.

On 3 January, a student protest was held in Aleksandrovac, the largest in the town's history. The students were joined by other citizens, including some of their professors. On the same day, after a round of negotiations with education workers' unions, Prime Minister Vučević stated that all education workers who decide to strike will be fired and replaced. This statement caused widespread negative reactions among education workers, who characterized the statement as "arrogant" and "insulting".

The government tabloid Večernje Novosti published pictures of Croatian passports showing the names and personal data of two student protesters, claiming they are "Croatian spies" sent to "destabilize Serbia". In reality, the students in question came from Croatian Serb refugee families and held both Serbian and Croatian citizenship. The students announced they will sue Večernje Novosti, due to a breach of the Serbian data protection laws. The public widely condemned the article.

On 6 January, high-school students in Požarevac organized a protest, which began with 15 minutes of silence.

On 10 January, protesters in Belgrade gathered in front of the Palace of Justice, and afterwards blocked the ring road in downtown Belgrade. Protests were also held in Novi Sad, Niš, Zrenjanin and Kikinda.

On 11 January, protesters gathered in front of the offices of BIA in Novi Sad, inviting the BIA employees over "for a friendly chat". The building was heavily guarded by police. A large protest was simultaneously organized in Kragujevac by local high-school students, joined by medical workers. During the night, students of technical faculties in Belgrade reported that the unknown persons entered the campus despite the blockade and started threatening them.

On 12 January, around 20,000 students and citizens gathered in front of the Constitutional Court of Serbia in Belgrade, demanding the prosecution of those responsible for the canopy collapse and expressing their support to the school workers' union which announced a possible general strike. The protest began with 15 minutes of silence. At the same time, students in Niš organized a protest in front of the Rectorate of the University of Niš. They put up a banner saying "Work stoppage due to protest" on the second floor of the Rectorate building.

On 13 January, late in the evening, unknown persons physically attacked the students blocking the Belgrade Faculty of Law, causing six students to be injured. The police intervened and one of the attackers was arrested.

On 14 January, the largest education workers' union (NSPRS) announced a one-day general strike, displeased with the government policy towards teachers and professors. The union representatives officially expressed their support for students and announced they will join the protests. On the same day, the workers union of Elektroprivreda Srbije, Serbia's state-owned power company, announced a general strike as well. In downtown Belgrade, thousands of students marched in a rally, expressing their support for the assaulted law students and the general strike.

On 16 January, during a 15-minute blockade in downtown Belgrade, a dark blue Ford Focus vehicle drove through the protesting students, carrying one student on the car roof for several meters without stopping. The injured student was taken to hospital and the driver was arrested and charged with attempted murder. This incident caused widespread outrage, causing thousands of people to rally later in the day in Belgrade, Novi Sad, Zrenjanin, Kragujevac and Kraljevo; whereas in Niš, some of the faculty professors joined the student blockade. In response to the protests in Kraljevo, the mayor of Kraljevo, Predrag Terzić, member of the SNS, compared the protestors with Ustaše members and published their names without their consent.

On 16 January, in Čačak, hooligans stormed the family home of a religious teacher who was a union representative, threatening him into voting against the next general strike. Earlier during the day, the teacher met with mayor Milun Todorović, where he was asked to vote against the strike. This sparked outrage throughout Čačak, and during the next day, thousands gathered in support of the teacher.

On 17 January, opposition members of the Novi Sad city assembly took control of the Novi Sad city hall, but were soon forced out by the police in riot gear. Later during the day, an older man carrying a pocket knife tried to attack the students protesting in front of the Medical Faculty in Novi Sad. On the same day, protesters gathered in Vranje, where the names of 15 victims of the canopy collapse were read out loud.

==== Proclamation of the four demands ====
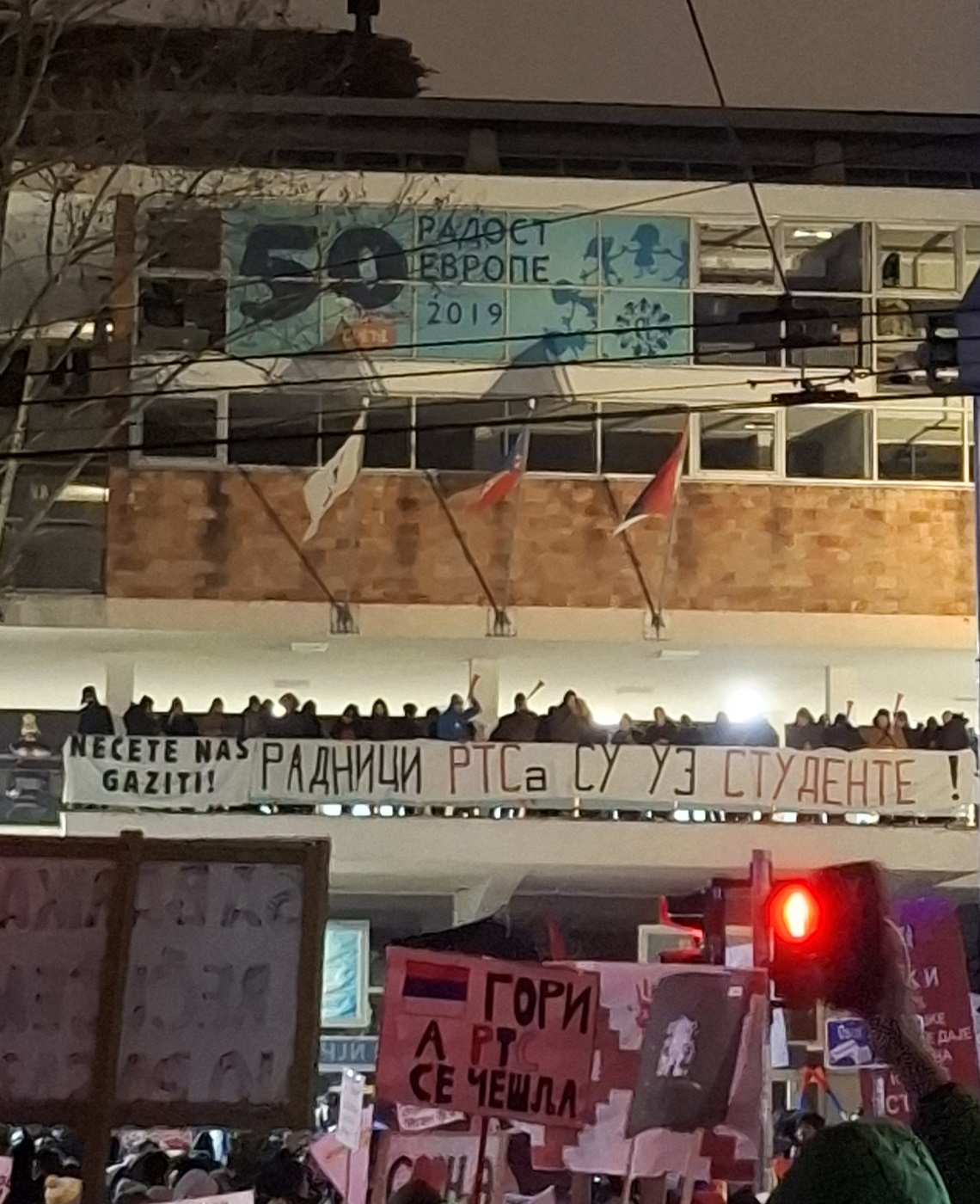
RTS employees publicly express their support for students, during the protest on 17 January.

On the evening of 17 January, tens of thousands of students and citizens organized a large protest in front of the RTS building in Belgrade due to dissatisfaction with the way RTS covered the protests, once comparing the protesters' symbols with that of Hamas. The protest began with 15 minutes of silence. Afterwards, the students paraded with a giant Cobra doll, parodying Vučić's earlier statements about Cobra special forces, and with a giant sandwich intended for the CEO of RTS, parodying the cliché of SNS supporters being paid with sandwiches. The protesters played the audio recording of their demands:

1. the publication of the entire documentation on the reconstruction of the Railway Station,
2. the dismissal of the charges against the arrested and detained students, activists and citizens at the previous protests regarding the tragedy in Novi Sad,
3. the filing of criminal charges against all attackers of students, professors and citizens,
4. an increase in the budget for faculties for 20 percent.

The workers of the RTS gathered on the balcony and showed the banners saying "RTS employees support the students" and "You cannot run us over", referencing the vehicular attacks on the protestors.

On 18 January, the Bar Association of Serbia announced a 7-day general strike, commencing on 20 January. During that period, the lawyers will not attend any court proceedings. When asked about the lawyer's strike in a TV interview, Vučić compared lawyers to "a mob". The Bar Association condemned Vučić's statement and announced a protest. On the same day, teachers and professors protested in Novi Sad, demanding the resignation of the university rector, and accusing him of supporting the attacks on students. Education workers also protested in Pirot. Students, school teachers and citizens protested in Kragujevac, as well. Students announced that a blockade of all three bridges in Novi Sad (Liberty Bridge, Varadin Bridge and Žeželj Bridge) will take place on 1 February, to mark the three months since the canopy collapse while also being the Day of the city.

==== Education sector dissent ====
On 19 January, around 10,000 teachers, professors, students and citizens protested in Čačak in support of the attacked religious teacher. Students carried a cardboard replica of a bulldozer, as a reference to the Bulldozer Revolution. In front of the SNS offices, the protesters stopped and shouted "fascists, fascists", "resignations" and threw eggs at the windows. In Kraljevo, mayor Predrag Terzić was booed in public because of his posts against the student protesters. In Belgrade, 20,000 education workers protested and were joined by students. The protest symbolically lasted for 45 minutes.

Due to the existence of several different education workers' unions, the decision on the strike was ultimately left to individual schools. Around 35 percent of schools, both elementary and high schools throughout Serbia, decided to go on strike starting 20 January. In Subotica, students and citizens protested in the city center, expressing their support for lawyers and education workers. This protest also began with 15 minutes of silence.

On 20 January, parents gathered in front of several elementary schools in Novi Sad to express their support for the teachers. In the Belgrade municipality of Surčin, dozens of hooded people, allegedly tied to SNS, tried to forcefully enter an elementary school which was on strike, and verbally threatened the principal and teachers. Some parents came to assist the teachers, filmed the attackers, and the attackers eventually left. In Zrenjanin, school inspectors were ordered by the Ministry of Education to enter the elementary schools which declared strike, but they refused.

In some schools in Belgrade and Novi Sad, parents gathered and chased out the school inspectors. Students protested in Novi Pazar. The silence was extended to 16 minutes, in protest against the lenient sentence for the for the driver who killed Ernad Bakan in a traffic accident Employees of Elektroprivreda Srbije also declared a strike and announced they will be joining the protests.

==== Colour revolution allegation ====
On 21 January, hooded people put up banners on the overpasses on the Belgrade highway, showing a picture of a flipped middle finger with the inscription "This is the response of the Serbian people to your colour revolution". Many prominent SNS members, including the mayor of Kraljevo, also shared the picture of the flipped middle finger on their social media profiles. The middle finger was also drawn overnight in several Belgrade schoolyards, but pupils drew flowers over them in response. It is worth noting that term "colour revolution", although common in countries of the former Soviet Union, was never widely used in Serbia. The activists would later take down the banners. In one case, a hooded person who helped put up the banners attacked the activists; the attacker was filmed and doxxed later. On the same day, high-school students and citizens protested in Obrenovac.

In the evening hours of 21 January, undercover police stormed the Belgrade hotel where students from abroad were staying for an international conference, organized by ERSTE Foundation. Five female students from Croatia were singled out by police, transported to the police station, accused of helping the protests and deported. This act was condemned by Croatia, as well as by anti-government protesters in Serbia.

==== 24 January general strike ====
By 22 January, dozens of companies throughout Serbia announced that they will perform a general strike on 24 January. Some online retail websites were temporarily taken offline between 11:52 am and 12:07 pm. Employees of technology companies headquartered in New Belgrade joined the students in road blockades and protests. In Čačak, medical workers joined the protest. That same day, two MPs from the SNS officially resigned, without providing an explanation.

On 23 January, during the protest in Kraljevo, protesters threw eggs at the local SNS offices and at the mayor, Predrag Terzić, who was present in front of the offices. Protesters shouted "murderers, murderers". On that same day, in an open letter, 17 judges publicly expressed their support for students' demands. Over a hundred different companies publicly stated they will support the general strike and will not operate on 24 January.

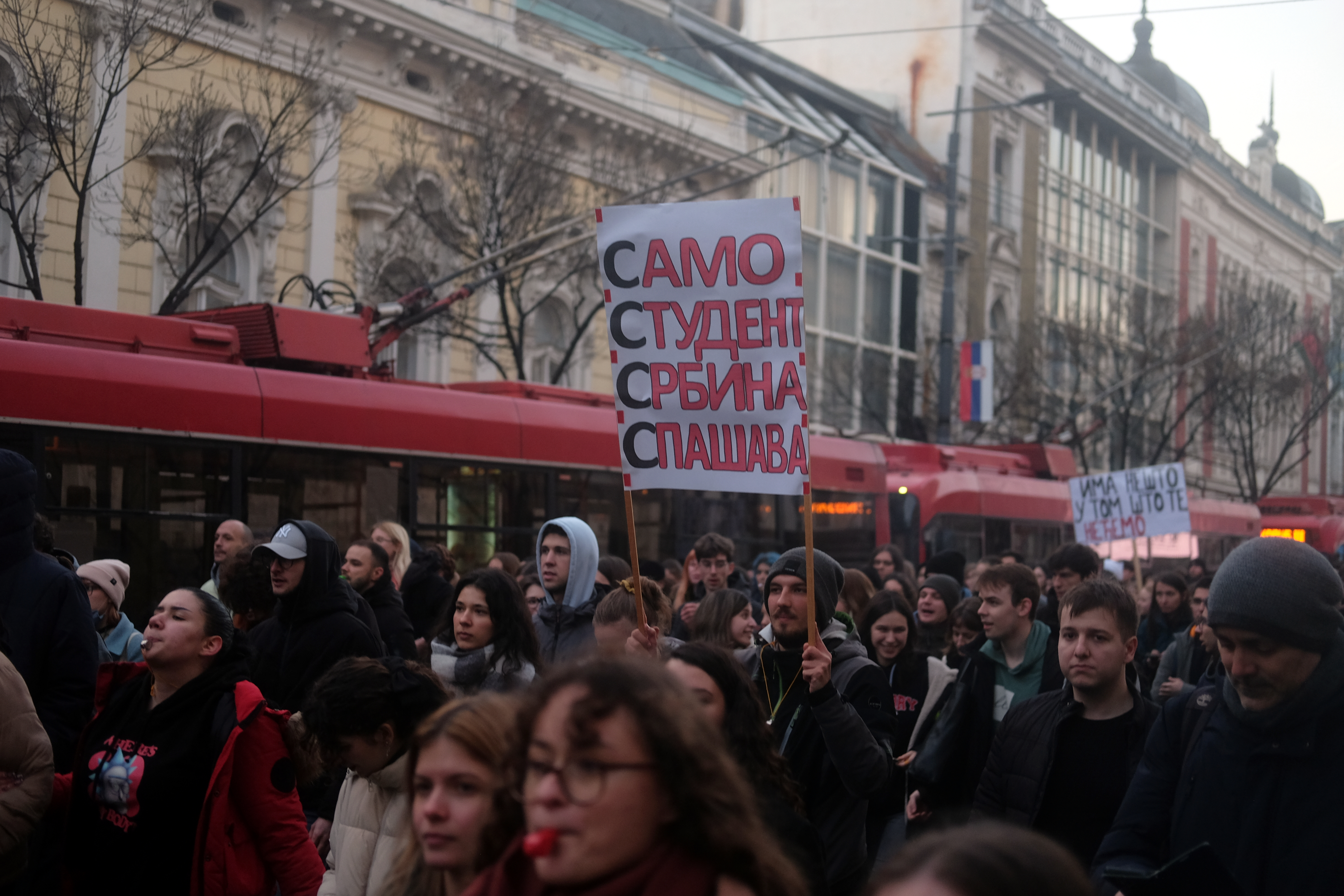
A march during the general strike in Belgrade on 24 January 2025. The banner in the foreground reads "Само Студент Србина Спашава" (Only a Student[s] Saves the Serbs), a play on the national slogan "Only Unity Saves the Serbs".

On 24 January, large protests were held in Apatin, Belgrade, Gornji Milanovac, Jagodina, Lazarevac, Leskovac, Kragujevac, Niš, Novi Sad, Novi Pazar, Petrovac na Mlavi, Stara Pazova, and Vlasotince. In Lazarevac, the students were joined by miners from the RB Kolubara mines. In Belgrade, high-school pupils, lawyers and tech companies organized their protest together with students. Two columns of protesters crossed the Branko's Bridge from both sides and symbolically connected two sides of the river. Medical workers and workers in social care institutions either left their workplaces while the protesters were passing by or made statements of support. In Novi Sad, opposition parties blocked the highway with motor vehicles for a brief period of time.

==== Jagodina SNS rally ====
The protest in Jagodina was specific since it was organized on the same day as the large SNS gathering, albeit a few hours earlier. Despite that, there were no reported incidents within the city; however, in the Belgrade municipality of Voždovac, local residents attempted to physically stop a bus driving SNS supporters to Jagodina. The SNS supporters arrived later in the afternoon.

Speaking at the SNS gathering, president Vučić stated that he wants peace and stability, that "children need to go to schools", and that he will "not sanction Russia, nor any other friendly nation". He also announced the formation of a new political movement.

==== Autokomanda blockade ====
During the protests in New Belgrade, a black Citroën ran over two students and seriously injured them. Afterwards, the protesters surrounded the vehicle and destroyed it. The driver, a young woman, was arrested by undercover police. Students announced that they will organize a day-long blockade of the Autokomanda intersection in downtown Belgrade on 27 January. The Ministry of Education called on schools to reduce the January salaries for those education workers who are on strike.

In the morning hours of 25 January, over 650 bikers from different biker clubs gathered in Belgrade, donated food to students blocking the Faculty of Dramatic Arts, and afterwards proceeded downtown, in support of the student who was overrun. Their protest began with 15 minutes of silence, honoring the victims of the canopy collapse. Farmers from towns and villages around Novi Sad formed columns and moved towards the city with their tractors. Their proclaimed goal was to park the tractors in front of protesting students, thereby shielding them from possible attacks. Near Rumenka, the farmers were blocked by a unit of Gendarmery with riot gear, prohibiting them from moving further. Students from Novi Sad came to assist the farmers and the unit was eventually forced to pull back. Around 30 tractors reached the campus in Novi Sad. Citizens also protested in Mladenovac, Pirot, Prijepolje, Smederevo, Svrljig, Vršac and Zrenjanin.

On the morning of 26 January, farmers from Banatsko Novo Selo moved towards Belgrade with their tractors. Their aim was to supply food for students blocking the Belgrade Agronomic Faculty and to leave at least 10 tractors there as a shield against possible attacks. The farmers reached the faculty in the afternoon.

On 26 January, bikers organized a protest in Kragujevac, commemorating the victims with 15 minutes of silence. Citizens also protested in Niš, Subotica, Varvarin and Zaječar.

On the morning of 27 January, students, bikers and farmers on tractors blocked the Autokomanda intersection in downtown Belgrade. The blockade began with 15 minutes of silence and was scheduled to last for 24 hours. Tens of thousands attended the blockade; students played volleyball and boardgames, and made barbecue. Early the next day, the students cleaned up the intersection. At the same time, citizens protested in Prokuplje and Kuršumlija. Civil engineers announced that they would protest on 29 January. They also asked the Ministry of Construction to amend the Law on Planning and Construction and appoint experts to key positions in the relevant institutions.

==== Novi Sad baseball bat attack and Vučević's resignation ====
Around 3 a.m. on 28 January, students putting up posters in Novi Sad were attacked by masked individuals carrying baseball bats in front of the local offices of SNS. After repeated calls and 30 minutes of waiting for the emergency medical team to arrive, students were transported to the hospital. One student was seriously injured and left with a broken jaw. This caused an outrage on social media. In response, the students announced a new protest in Novi Sad. Around 10 am, students gathered and drew graffiti on the windows of SNS offices in Novi Sad. At a press conference held at 11 am, Prime Minister Miloš Vučević, and mayor of Novi Sad Milan Đurić, both members of SNS, resigned, citing the attack as the reason. Vučević also informed the public that the attackers indeed came from the offices of the SNS. Four attackers were arrested. Every attacker had a previous criminal record. They were soon doxxed and had their mugshots from the police station were leaked on social media. Some social media users found several old photos of Vučević and his son together with some of the attackers; despite rumors of this being a possible reason for resignation, his alleged personal connection with the attackers was not officially confirmed. At least two of the four attackers had previously collaborated with the city of Novi Sad in promoting recycling and environmental protection, for which they received funds from the city budget.

Later in the day, farmers blocked the regional road near Bresnica, in central Serbia, with tractors. They announced they will stay there for 24 hours. Another group of farmers blocked the Ibar Highway near Kraljevo with tractors, for the next 24 hours. In the evening hours, in Novi Sad, Belgrade, Čačak, Kragujevac, Niš and Pirot, thousands gathered in a march of solidarity with the attacked students. In Niš, students drew graffiti on the local SNS offices and announced a blockade of the central ringroad.

Following Vučević's resignation, president Vučić said he would pardon students and university teachers charged in connection with the protests and announced a major cabinet reshuffle, adding that he was considering on whether to call parliamentary elections or appoint a new government. Among those pardoned was the dean of the Faculty of Philology in Niš, who was never informed of any legal proceeding against her.

On 29 January, thousands of citizens protested in Gornji Milanovac and hundreds gathered in Lapovo. In Ivanjica, high-school pupils and their teachers organized a protest, starting with 15 minutes of silence. The school principal brought food for pupils who want to come back to classes, however, the pupils gave the food to stray dogs, filmed it and shared the video.

=== February 2025 ===
Also on 29 January, Belgrade students announced that they will walk by foot from Belgrade to Novi Sad to join the blockade on 1 February. High school pupils from the Belgrade municipality of Zemun announced a 24-hour blockade of the Zemun Gymnasium.

On the same day, the magazine Nova Ekonomija published an article revealing that the head of president Vučić's cabinet, Ivica Kojić, helped design the reconstruction and adaptation of the railway to Hungary, including the Novi Sad railway station. According to emails published by the Higher Public Prosecutor's Office in Novi Sad, Kojić promised the contractor that he would speed up the project's construction.

On 30 January, hundreds of students from Belgrade universities set off on a two-day walk from Belgrade to Novi Sad in order to support their Novi Sad colleagues in blocking all three bridges in that city, thereby marking three months since the collapse of the canopy. The Ministry of Internal Affairs announced that it would secure the walk route. Along the route, the students were greeted by citizens and by employees of Telekom Srbija, the state-owned telecommunications company. Citizens of Stara Pazova, a town along their route, welcomed the students with fireworks and over 150 kilograms of free food. Before students reached Inđija, the town's mayor, SNS member Marko Gašić, locked the entrance to the hall where the students were planning to sleep. Residents then offered them private accommodations, including one club owner who offered his night club for the students to sleep in. The students decided to stick together and spent the night in the open, sleeping on styrofoam. In the morning, they proceeded to Novi Sad.

Citizens protested in Grdelica, Kostolac and in Pećinci, despite rumors circulating that they would be fired from their jobs. On the same day, the European Commission officially demanded information from the prosecutors' offices in Belgrade and Novi Sad regarding the attacks on students throughout 2024 and 2025.

On 31 January, another attack with a motor vehicle happened in Belgrade. Medical workers were blocking the street in front of their workplace at the central psychiatric hospital, commemorating the victims with 15 minutes of silence, when a black Volkswagen Golf Mk5 drove right through them in full speed. Three medical workers were injured. The perpetrators, two young males, tried to escape, but were stopped by other medical workers.

In the evening hours, marching students reached Novi Sad, where they were welcomed by thousands of local residents. Together, they held a vigil at the Novi Sad railway station, with 15 minutes of silence. Over a hundred taxi drivers from Belgrade announced a departure on 2 February at 1 pm from Nikola Tesla Airport, in order to transport students back from Novi Sad free of charge.

In Belgrade, employees of the public transit company GSP Belgrade announced a protest for 5 February, demanding that the mayor, Aleksandar Šapić, "be held criminally liable for the damage caused to GSP, together with his assistant Miroslav Čučković".

On 1 February, on the City Day and the three-month anniversary of the canopy collapse, large crowds gathered at the entrance to Novi Sad; columns of cars waited for hours at the toll gates to join the protests and blockade. A long line of several hundred bikers was seen at the entrance to Novi Sad, and many farmers also joined the protest with their tractors. Around 3 pm, students blocked all three bridges in Novi Sad. Tens of thousands of citizens gathered, and the protest started with 15 minutes of silence. Two of the bridges were blocked for three hours, while Liberty Bridge was blocked for 24 hours. After the students on the bridge voted, it was extended for three more hours in order to clean up the area.

In Čačak, teachers, professors and their students blocked the two bridges over the West Morava for an hour in support of the students in Novi Sad. Farmers have arranged for their tractors to be parked in front of the bridges, in order to protect the protesters. Citizens also protested in Kladovo, Krupanj, Kuršumlija, Prijepolje, Prokuplje and Žitorađa. Judges of the Basic and Higher Courts in Niš publicly supported the students' demands. In its prime-time news program, RTS briefly reported about the Novi Sad protest. This was condemned as "scandalous" and "biased" by the SNS.

On 2 February, the Bar Association of Serbia announced a 30-day strike. In Novi Sad, 671 taxi vehicles from Belgrade organized a lift back to Belgrade for students completely free of charge. On the same day, protests were organized in Bajina Bašta, Jagodina, Kosjerić, Šabac, Užice, Vlasotince and Vršac. In Šabac, students and teachers blocked the bridge over the Sava river for 225 minutes, 15 minutes for each of the 15 victims. In Užice, residents blocked the main motorway leading into the city by standing on the bridge above the Đetinja river despite freezing temperatures.

On 3 February, the Higher Public Prosecutor's Office in Novi Sad announced that the Special Department for Suppression of Corruption had launched an investigation into corruption in connection with the reconstruction of the canopy of the Novi Sad Railway Station. In Belgrade, a 15-minute silence was held at the intersection in front of the city's mental hospital for those killed in the collapse. In addition to employees and citizens, bikers also blocked the intersection in front of the building to protect employees and the crowd, given that two doctors were injured at the same location a few days ago when they were hit by a car at full speed. Students from several Belgrade high schools also protested in front of their respective schools. Artists protested in front of the Ministry of Culture, while professors of the Aviation Academy and the parents whose children attend the academy blocked the intersection in front of the central government building.

On 4 February, students, teachers, farmers and bikers organized a large protest in Kragujevac. The protesters carried boxes with ideas on city improvement to the city hall. Protesters also gathered in Arandjelovac, for the third time in a week, to support of the kindergarten teachers on strike. On the same day, the Police Union of Serbia (PSS) sent a letter to the Minister of the Interior, Ivica Dačić, demanding an increase in salaries and the introduction of additional benefits for employees in the Ministry of the Interior (MUP). The union proposed that the wages of employees with secondary education, civil servants and office workers be increased by at least 15 percent of the salary for March, while the wages of employees with higher education by at least five percent. In addition, the PSS requested the payment of compensation for food costs during work in the amount of 15,000 dinars for all employees, as well as annual vacation allowance of at least 85,000 dinars, starting in 2025. Nearly 500 policemen have signed a petition supporting the students' demands.

On 5 February, five simultaneous protests were held in Belgrade. Pensioners protested at Republic Square in support of the students. medical workers protested in front of the Zemun hospital, students gathered in front of the Ministry of Education, another group of students blocked the central street in Banovo Brdo, and employees of the public transit company GSP protested in front of the company headquarters in Dorćol. Students announced a large protest to be held on 15 February in Kragujevac, on the anniversary of the Sretenje Constitution. Medical and social workers union "Nezavisnost", with around 2,500 members in Niš, officially supported the students and their demands. Professors and teachers protested in Leskovac. Citizens also protested in Sombor, where students were joined by medical workers and local librarians.

On the same day, Forbes Serbia published the statement that the former Minister of Construction, Goran Vesić, gave to the prosecutor on 22 November 2024. Vesić stated that he does not consider himself responsible, nor could he in any way contribute to the accident, as well as that "the station was not put into operation just because he came to the opening." He denied that the vestibule (main hall) of the station was commissioned on his order. Vesić mentioned that in March 2022, the first part of the station was put into operation, i.e. the platforms and tracks and the part of the station that passengers used until the vestibule was put into operation. And then a ceremony was organized. "At that time, there was no use permit" the statement reads. The statement also describes the procedure for the internal acceptance and handover of Wing B in June–July 2024, from the Chinese consortium as a contractor to the Serbian Railways Infrastructure as an investor. Vesić said that he found out about the memo, which stated that after the internal reception, passengers will be able to use lobby B, only after the canopy fell. Describing the process of internal reception in more detail, the former minister said that his ministry was not mentioned anywhere in the mutual communication regarding the handover, and that his assistant Anita Dimoski was familiar with the correspondence because she was always named as the recipient of the emails. Concluding the description of the events surrounding the handover, he stated that the handover took place on July 4, 2024, and that the use of the lobby was enabled from that day.

Slovenian newspapers Večer and Delo published speculations that Goran Vesić and Belgrade mayor Aleksandar Šapić had both left Serbia and were currently residing in privately owned mansions in Trieste, Italy.

On 6 February, the Government of Serbia adopted a decision providing 12.01 billion dinars for higher education. According to the official announcement by the Government, the budget for education is thereby increased by 20 percent, fulfilling the fourth demand of the student plenums. On the same day, in the Novi Sad neighborhood of Telep, a car with Croatian license plates attempted to drive through the protesters blocking the road for 15 minutes. There were no casualties and the driver fled before police arrived. Parents whose children attend elementary schools in Novi Sad organized a protest after some parents who openly supported the school teachers' strike received phone calls from police. In Topola, farmers blocked the motorway with tractors. Students also protested in Crna Trava.

The Serbian Medical Association (SLD), the umbrella organization of doctors and dentists, announced that their Assembly officially supports all demands issued by the students of the blocked Medical Faculties.

Serbian newspaper Danas published an article revealing that Marko Tošin, one of the attackers who stormed out of the SNS offices in Novi Sad on 28 January and broke a student's jaw with a baseball bat, was released from custody merely a day after the arrest. The article sparked outrage on social media.

According to Forbes Serbia, the families of the victims of the Novi Sad accident were interested in joining the criminal prosecution by pressing charges against the persons responsible for the death of their loved ones. This followed testimony before the prosecutor that was attached as part of the indictment, which Forbes Serbia had access to. Former dean and professor of the Belgrade Faculty of civil engineering, Vladan Kuzmanović, stated that Aleksandar Vučić and Miloš Vučević essentially led the Railway Station reconstruction in Novi Sad. The European Parliament's rapporteur for Serbia, Tonino Picula, assessed that Serbia is in an "undeclared state of emergency", and that the President Vučić has not found a way to compensate for the dissatisfaction of those people who protest.

On 7 February, lawyers organized a protest in front of the RTS building. The lawyers demanded that their voices be heard and called upon policemen and members of the Serbian Armed Forces to join a general strike. The informal community of elementary school teachers in New Belgrade - PULS announced a large protest gathering and walk through New Belgrade on 8 February. Theatrical actors from the theaters in Belgrade, Novi Sad, Sombor and Zrenjanin started a seven-day strike. In Belgrade, protesters blocked the Pupin Bridge connecting Zemun with Borča. Citizens also protested in Niš. During the protest, an unknown person approached the dean of the Niš Faculty of Philosophy, threatened her and physically attacked her. In Prijepolje, high school teachers protested, despite receiving verbal threats. In Subotica, students, professors and citizens organized a protest, which began with 15 minutes of silence. Afterwards, the gathered crowd moved towards the city hall, where they left a message for the mayor, Stevan Bakić, an SNS member, who previously compared the protesters with Ustase members and accused them of "destroying Serbia".

In Bogatić, SNS-led local authorities organized a public hearing on the municipal spatial plan, which also includes lithium exploration, behind closed doors, contrary to the Serbian Law on Local Administration. Hundreds of farmers and protesters entered the Bogatić municipality building, where a public hearing was scheduled to take place, and physically carried the local chairman of the SNS outside. SNS banners, visible on the town square, were torn down. Farmers and protesters organized a plenary session, during which they expressed support for the students' demands. Kragujevac students from blocked faculties announced they will run a 137-kilometer relay marathon to the Church of St. Sava in Belgrade to hand over invitations to their colleagues for the protest scheduled on Sretenje, 15 February, in Kragujevac.

On 8 February, teachers and professors from 18 New Belgrade elementary schools, joined by parents whose children attend those schools, blocked the central turnaround in New Belgrade. In Niš, students, professors and citizens organized a 15 km-long protest walk to Merošina. On the same day, during his speech at the SNS gathering in a sports hall in Kikinda, president Vučić announced that he is writing a book about his "glorious victory against the colour revolution in Serbia" and that the book will be finished by Vidovdan. Another SNS gathering was organized in the cultural center of Lazarevac, where President of the National Assembly Ana Brnabić and Minister of Finance Siniša Mali, both SNS members, were scheduled to speak. Protesters gathered in front of the center, waited for Brnabić and Mali to come out and booed them; during the gathering, Brnabić called the protesters "cowards", but once outside, she smiled and waved at them.

On 9 February, students of the Agronomic Faculty, together with farmers on tractors, blocked the Gazela Bridge in Belgrade to commemorate 100 days since the canopy collapse. In Niš, students blocked the highway tolls. Protesters also blocked the local intersections in Ruma and Zrenjanin. In the afternoon hours, students running a relay marathon from Kragujevac to Belgrade, reached Mladenovac, where over a hundred locals gathered along their route to applaud and cheer them on. When students reached the Belgrade municipality of Voždovac, residents formed a column with their vehicles and escorted the students to the Church of St. Sava in downtown Belgrade, where thousands of people gathered to welcome them. The students thanked the crowd, and invited them to come to the large protest scheduled for 15 February in Kragujevac. On the same day, former prime minister Vučević, when asked about the protesters in an interview, said: "Enough with their nonsense. Who gave them the right to determine who is what and who did what, who are they to talk about it? They have no empathy for anything."

On 10 February, a group of students who had been running from Novi Sad to Belgrade since the morning arrived at the plateau in front of the Belgrade Faculty of Philosophy, where a red carpet was laid out for them. They cut the red ribbon holding their index cards and were then awarded medals, with the audience chanting: "Novi Sad, Novi Sad". They were greeted with fireworks as they crossed Branko's Bridge. The Novi Sad "marathoners" symbolically handed over the Constitution of Serbia as a baton to their colleagues - students from Belgrade faculties. Participants in the relay marathon from Novi Sad faculties and colleges plan to walk with students blocking Belgrade faculties to Kragujevac.

On 11 February, in temperatures of minus six degrees Celsius, 180 students from Niš set off on foot to Kragujevac, where the large protest is scheduled for 15 February. Around 6 pm they arrived in Aleksinac, where they spent the night in the local Sports Hall. Along the way, they received applause, chants of support, and a warm welcome was given to them by the villagers in Tešica, who also prepared lunch for them. On the way to Aleksinac, the villagers invited the students to rest for the night, offered them food and refreshments. The students were welcomed in Aleksinac - a banner saying "Welcome, dear students" was placed at the entrance to the promenade, and the students were greeted with fireworks and lots of food and beverages. Students who walked from Novi Sad and Belgrade, arrived in Sopot in the evening hours. They had planned to sleep in the local sports hall with heating, however, the President of the Municipality Živorad Milosavljević, a member of the SNS, denied permission. The sports hall remained locked, but the citizens organized themselves and found alternative accommodation for the students, in some cases even in plastic greenhouses. On the same day, Members of the European Parliament (EP) discussed the situation in Serbia and advised the Serbian authorities that everyone must have the right to freedom of assembly and demanded that all incidents against students and citizens demonstrating in Serbia are investigated. The debate was held at the request of the Social Democrats, and the majority of MEPs supported the protests, saying "Serbian students are the voice of hope and awareness of the entire Balkans".

On 12 February, farmers from Rača blocked all access roads to the municipality with tractors, protesting the increase in local property taxes and in support of students. On the same day, the Public Attorney's Office announced that part of the investigation into the fall of the canopy was transferred to the Prosecutor's Office for Organized Crime. Simultaneously, Milorad Grčić, the former acting director of Elektroprivreda Srbije (EPS), President of the Belgrade municipality of Obrenovac and a member of SNS, was arrested, under suspicion that he defrauded EPS for more than one million euros, according to the Higher Public Prosecutor's Office. The government announced a large pro-SNS gathering to be held in Sremska Mitrovica, and started contacting party members and sympathizers. According to N1, the organizers of the rally resorted to pressuring employees in public enterprises to come due to decreased support of the government.

On 13 February, students from Kraljevo, together with their colleagues from Novi Pazar, set off on foot to Kragujevac, where a large gathering was to be held on 15 February. The flags of Kraljevo and Novi Pazar came together in front of the Faculty of Mechanical and Civil Engineering in Kraljevo and the students set off on a walking route of over 50 kilometers. Along the way, they met in Mrčajevci with their colleagues from Užice, Čačak and Gornji Milanovac, from where they continued together to Kragujevac. On the same day, the informal community of Belgrade primary schools "PULS" organized a protest in front of the Ministry of Education. They said that they will not negotiate with the Ministry, and informed the public that 65% of schools have suspended classes. Employees of Radio Belgrade also organized a protest. The Belgrade Philharmonic Orchestra announced it will hold a charity concert, and all proceeds from ticket sales will go to the persons injured by the canopy collapse in Novi Sad.

After news spread about the arrest of the President of Obrenovac, Milorad Grčić, the President of the Assembly of Serbia, Ana Brnabić, herself head of the Belgrade section of the SNS, came to visit the municipal SNS committee in Obrenovac. In front of the party premises, she was met by a hundred SNS members furious about Grčić's arrest. The attendees refused to allow Brnabić to speak, marking the first publicly visible sign of discontent within the party. According to the weekly magazine Radar, in late December, the leaders of all of Serbia's security services had separate meetings with then-prime minister Vučević, where they were supposed to confirm their readiness to "protect the country's constitutional order by any means necessary". Although the surveyed security people answered the question positively, some felt the need to further demonstrate their loyalty in the following days, whereas others were merely thanked by the authorities for their work so far and retired in almost absolute silence.

On 14 February, the Public Prosecutor's Office in Belgrade proposed suspended sentences for the persons who physically attacked the students of the Belgrade Faculty of Law. On the same day, during his official visit to the Republika Srpska, president Vučić compared the protesters in Serbia with "sediment and filth which occasionally rises to the surface". The Serbian subsidiary of Assicurazioni Generali decided to withdraw from the work of the Serbian Chamber of Commerce and the Association of Insurers of Serbia, after both organizations refused to respond to tabloid attacks that the president of the company's executive board, Dragan Filipović, was subjected to. The pro-government tabloids Informer and Republika published a photo of Filipović at the student protests which he attended in a private capacity, accusing him of "wanting to destroy the country". The company itself was also targeted, through texts that unfoundedly claimed that it was losing the Serbian market.

On 15 February, the anniversary of the 1835 declaration of the Sretenje Constitution, a large protest was held in Kragujevac. The gathering, named "Sretnimo se na Sretenje" ("Let's Meet on Sretenje"), lasted for 15 hours, during which time Lepenički Boulevard, one of the main roads in the city, was blockaded. Many students present at the protest had walked on foot, some traveling as far as 150 kilometers to attend. Large numbers of vehicles also made their way to the city, with a total of 165,000 protesters attending the gathering. Protesters also gathered at Trg Republike in Belgrade in support of the gathering in Kragujevac. President Vučić held a counter-rally that same day in Sremska Mitrovica, at which he described the protests as "the dirtiest color revolution in the history of mankind" and claimed that three billion euros had been invested by foreign powers to topple his government. The executive board of the United Branch Unions "Nezavisnost" ("Independence") stated that public sector employees were pressured to attend the pro-government rally, at which some 20,000 people were present. The next day, around 300 taxi drivers drove to Kragujevac to transport the students back home, where they were greeted warmly. An additional protest was announced for 1 March in Niš.

On 18 February, the farmers who protested in Rača stormed the local municipality building and occupied it, demanding lower taxes and resignations of local officials. The farmers expressed their support for the student protesters.

On 19 February, the organization CRTA (Center for Research, Transparency and Accountability) released a survey of a representative sample of Serbian citizens' opinions on the protests. According to the report, around 80% of respondents supported the majority of the students' demands and 64% support or mostly support the protests themselves, and that 33% of respondents claimed to have taken part in at least one protest in Serbia during the previous three months. When asked who they would trust more, 46% of respondents stated they would trust the students, 21% would trust President Vučić, 12% would trust both equally, with the remaining 21% trusting neither or having no answer.

On the same day, in Kraljevo, opposition councilors blocked the city assembly. Protests in front of the assembly building would last for several hours, and eggs were thrown at the mayor, Predrag Terzić. One opposition councilor was detained by the police, and the mayor was evacuated in a police vehicle.

On 20 February, a protest was held at Vukov Spomenik in Belgrade, where 15 minutes of silence was observed. The gathering, which was organized by citizens from the municipalities of Stari Grad, Savski Venac, Palilula, Zvezdara, and Vračar, as well as by the organization "Ustala je Ustanička," was attended by nearly 14,000 protesters.

On 21 February, students, educators, parents, and citizens in Prijepolje held a gathering in memory of the 15 lives lost in Novi Sad. The protest was attended by students of the State University of Novi Pazar, at the request of whom the 15 minutes of silence were extended to 16 in remembrance of Ernad Bakan, a student from Novi Pazar killed in 2019 while studying in Belgrade by a speeding car. Protesters considered the sentence given to the driver as lenient. Additional protests were held that day in Čačak, Ivanjica, and Ljig. During the 12-hour blockade in Čačak, a plenum of students and citizens voted to boycott RTS and announced they would walk on foot to attend the gathering in Niš on 1 March. Students of Mihajlo Pupin Technical Department in Zrenjanin, who had left the city the day before with the goal of walking to Vršac, were greeted warmly in the villages of Velika Greda and later in Plandište, where they stayed the night.

On 24 February, Žarko Mićin was elected as the new mayor of Novi Sad by the City Assembly, with 45 councilors voting in his favor. The opposition boycotted the session, citing a heavy police and Žandarmerija presence around the assembly building, which led to clashes with citizens protesting the election process. Protesters attempted to enter the assembly and threw eggs, red paint, yogurt, flour, and toilet paper at the police and the building, prompting multiple police interventions to prevent them from approaching the premises. The police reported that five officers were injured during the protests and denied allegations that opposition councilors were prevented from attending the session. In his address, Mićin emphasized his commitment to being a mayor for all citizens of Novi Sad and prioritized the inspection of all city-owned buildings to prevent future tragedies. On the same day, SNS organized a gathering in Srbobran in a local theater, attended by the resigned Prime Minister Miloš Vučević. The citizens organized a protest in front of the venue and booed at Vučević. In the village of Cvetke, near Kraljevo, the gathered villagers threw eggs at the visiting mayor of Kraljevo, Predrag Terzić.

On 25 February, the Parliament Speaker and head of the Belgrade branch of SNS, Ana Brnabić, told the media that the Serbian National Assembly will consider the resignation of Prime Minister Miloš Vučević as the last item on the agenda at its session on 4 March.

On 27 February, pupils of the Fifth Belgrade Gymnasium blocked entry into their school, protesting the appointment of the new, SNS-affiliated principal. President Vučić commented on the event by saying: "The terror that you see here is being carried out by the pupils of the Fifth Belgrade Gymnasium against the school principal Danka Nešović."

On 28 February, seven archbishops of the Serbian Orthodox Church signed an open letter supporting the students' right to protest and condemning the derogatory speech aimed against them. "As hierarchs of the Serbian Orthodox Church, we feel a duty to publicly express our disagreement and distance ourselves from any speech that dehumanizes another person, and especially from speech that belittles the young people, students, as a factor in building the society, a factor that contributes to its future, or that humiliates them as the ones called upon to think and seek the truth."

=== March 2025 ===
==== Student Edict ====
On 1 March, another large protest was held in Niš. Tens of thousands of protesters gathered, marking four months since the canopy collapse with 15 minutes of silence. In reference to the Edict of Milan issued by the Niš-born Roman Emperor Constantine I, the students drafted and presented the "Student Edict", which contains provisions on freedom, state, justice, youth, dignity, knowledge, solidarity and the future. After the protest, columns of taxi drivers from various cities transported the students back home, free of charge. Citizens also protested in Inđija, where a man threatened the protesters with a knife. On the same day, in its evening news program, RTS aired the news coverage of the Niš protest before airing the official statement by president Vučić. Pro-government tabloids characterized such reporting as a "coup d'etat" and accused RTS of being "controlled by students".

On 2 March, students and high school pupils from Gornji Milanovac blocked the Ibar Highway. The blockade lasted four hours, from 11 am to 4 pm. In Belgrade, citizens blocked the Blue Bridge, which connects the Konjarnik and Medaković neighborhoods, to express support for students' demands. In Krupanj, residents protested the arrival of Miloš Vučević, who was attending an SNS party debate in that town. The informal association of education workers, "United Education of Serbia", announced that the professors and schoolteachers will embark on an "educational relay walk", an action called "A Step to Freedom" during which, from 3 to 6 March, they will walk around 160 kilometers from Belgrade to Čačak, where a large protest of education workers will take place.

On the same day, speaking at the SNS gathering in Bor, president Vučić said: "Can you imagine, yesterday RTS was reporting from Niš, and it was done by some imbecile reporter from their Niš office"; Vučić later apologized for calling the correspondent an "imbecile" and RTS condemned the statement. 46 journalists and media workers from Niš announced that they had rejected Vučić's apology, and said that they will not follow nor report about his activities until an appropriate apology is made.

On 3 March, the "Sloga" police union expressed its support for the "Student Edict" adopted on 1 March in Niš, describing this as a manifesto of the struggle for institutions which should serve the citizens, and not serve the interests of individuals. The Novi Sad Police Association "Dr Rudolf Arčibald Rajs" wrote an open letter to the Minister of Interior Ivica Dačić, expressing their concern about the "worrying practice in which the police, instead of applying the law and protecting public order and peace, become victims of political calculations". Several employees of public utility companies in Novi Sad spoke to media about allegedly losing their jobs after they openly supported the protests.

==== Reprisals against education workers ====
On 4 March, Prime Minister Miloš Vučević said that professors and teachers who protested will not receive the first part of their February salary. That same day, a brawl erupted during a session in the National Assembly, during which opposition MPs threw smoke bombs.

The salary of education workers was reduced between 50 and 100 percent; in some cases, high school teachers were paid only 2,191 RSD (less than 20 EUR). The Independent Trade Union of Teachers of Serbia (NSPRS) issued an official statement: "If the wages of school employees are reduced, and that reduction is not a consequence of legally implemented and legally prescribed disciplinary proceedings against each individual employee whose wages are reduced, the persons responsible for such proceedings will be the subject of lawsuits and criminal charges filed by NSPRS and every affected employee." An informal group of IT experts invited citizens to join the "Solidarity for Education" network and donate to help educators.

Due to attacks by pro-government tabloids on the President of the executive board of Assicurazioni Generali Serbia, Dragan Filipović, and the expulsion of civil society activists in January, a large event planned in Belgrade by the association was canceled, according to the magazine Nova Ekonomija.

==== Strikes of public-sector librarians and health workers ====
Employees of the National Library of Serbia announced a general strike, starting 6 March. The employees of the "Studenica" General Hospital and the Kraljevo Health Center announced a warning strike for 7 March, demanding the fulfillment of four demands. Among them is the publication of all documents about the 2015 crash of an Mi-17 helicopter that caused seven deaths, including a sick infant transported for treatment.

On 6 March, an incident happened in front of the Belgrade City Hall between protesters and a private security firm hired by the city. The private company in question was allegedly tied to "phantom voters" from the Republika Srpska who came to vote for the SNS at the December 2023 elections. In September 2024, this company, in a consortium with two other companies, concluded a framework agreement with the City of Belgrade, worth 180 million RSD for security. On the same day, citizens from ten Belgrade municipalities, after protesting in their respective municipalities in the previous weeks, decided to hold a joint gathering in front of the prosecutor's office at the Palace of Justice, where they came in several columns. They made noise by blowing whistles and vuvuzelas and beating drums, broken up with a 15-minute pause for a moment of silence to the victims of the Novi Sad Railway Station collapse.

On 7 March, workers of the RB Kolubara mines protested in front of their office building in Lazarevac. In Kosjerić, students blocked the local bridge. Thousands of citizens protested in Kragujevac, Kruševac, Niš and Novi Sad, supporting the underpaid education workers and calling for a general strike. Many shops, bars and restaurants remained closed in support of the protests. In Belgrade, a huge column of people walked on the streets around the downtown area passing by government buildings. Marching students said their protest presented a 'prelude' to a massive rally planned for March 15 in Belgrade.

==== Prelude to 15. za 15 and "Students 2.0" ====
On the same day, a group of 30 young people gathered and set up tents in front of the president's office in Pioneers Park, Belgrade, claiming to be "Students 2.0" who want to end the protests and continue studying; however, numerous sources identified the persons as either SNS members or affiliates.

On 8 March, farmers in Bogatić blocked a street with tractors and clashed with the Žandarmerija gendarmerie unit which tried to remove them. Soon after, they were allowed to stay and even given permission to enter the local Agricultural Fair with their tractors. During his official visit to Kovačica, president Vučić was booed by dozens of local citizens, to which he responded: "They love me, man, the people, you can see how much they love me, it's a marvel! In here, 500 people are waiting for me at 20 meter distance, and 50 of them like to whistle and blow their horns, well, what am I supposed to do?".

In Smederevo, a large citizen's protest was organized, as well as a meeting of the SNS, simultaneously in the local Sports Center. Before the SNS gathering started, the police created a cordon around the Sports Center in order to prevent the gathered citizens from reaching the SNS meeting. The crowd then tore Vučić's poster from a nearby billboard. In Belgrade, thousands of students congregated to Republic Square, followed by farmers on tractors.

On 9 March, commenting on the large protest scheduled for 15 March, president Vučić said that he expects the opposition to "organize great violence" at the rally in Belgrade, and that "everyone who participates in it will be arrested", and stated that it will "take 15 minutes, an hour or two, because the state will be able to behave like a state; there is nothing to discuss". "The introduction of a state of emergency is one of the options, depending on what will happen on the streets on 15 March Vučić wants incidents to happen", MP of the Ecological Uprising, Aleksandar Jovanović Ćuta, told Vreme magazine.

On 10 March, the Independent Union of Educators of Serbia (NSPRS) filed criminal charges with the special anti-corruption departments of the higher prosecutor's offices in Belgrade, Novi Sad, Niš and Kraljevo against the outgoing Minister of Education and 12 advisors for material and financial affairs of school administrations due to the reduction of education salaries. Hundreds of students from Čačak, Niš and Subotica began their march on foot towards Belgrade, with the goal of reaching it prior to the great protest scheduled for 15 March.

On 10 March and into 11 March, the offices of the state-owned media broadcasters RTS and Radio-televizija Vojvodine were blockaded by large groups of students and citizens. Protesters also gathered outside RTV Kragujevac in a show of support. Clashes between demonstrators and Žandarmerija occurred during the protest in Belgrade outside the RTS building, during which time one plainclothes policeman was injured in the eye. President Vučić met with the man that night, posting on his Instagram account that he had been injured by "Bolshevik plenum members," though footage of the incident shows the policeman being struck by a uniformed officer. While Vučić and Minister Ivica Dačić claimed that the students attacked the police, officers can be seen beginning the violence by striking students with batons in video footage taken at the scene. Protesters announced that they intended to blockade the building for 22 hours, leading RTS to state that they would broadcast from their offices in Košutnjak the following day.

==== Media censorship & attacks ====
Due to independent journalism and support for anti-corruption protests, independent media outlets received serious threats from supporters of the Serbian Progressive Party and government officials.

In May 2025, Students 2.0 reportedly sent warning letters to several independent media outlets, threatening SLAPP lawsuits and even criminal charges. The letters claimed that the media published “baseless, tendentious and offensive comments” about President Aleksandar Vučić, the Serbian Progressive Party (SNS), and the Students 2.0 organization, that they believed were defamation. The warnings preceding a criminal complaint included the names of three influencers, Aleksandar "Cile ST" Leštarić, Danica Manojlović, and Luka Lekić, who were presented as "META Advisors" allegedly planning to illegally suspend the accounts of independent media on social networks. All three influencers have distanced themselves from these claims, stating that the allegations "have no basis in truth" and that their names were deliberately misused as retaliation for their support and participation in Serbian anti-corruption protests. Threats were described by lawyers as vague: the letters failed to specify which particular media reports were considered defamatory, and instead listed a broad set of potential legal actions without clear foundation.

On 13 August 2025, the Independent Journalists’ Association of Serbia (NUNS) and the Association of Independent Electronic Media (ANEM) condemned threats and attacks against journalists, calling for urgent investigation and prosecution. The threats targeted the Danas newspaper editorial team via Facebook Messenger, warning of a “bomb or grenade” and stating that “they will come to your home a little,” while journalist Marko Dragoslavić was physically assaulted on 12 August while photographing a construction site under a work ban. Authorities intervened, offered medical assistance, and arrested a suspect. NUNS and ANEM emphasized that such incidents constitute serious threats to media freedom and journalists’ safety, warning that impunity encourages further attacks and undermines the public's right to information.

Students 2.0 has been criticized for repeated attacks on journalists within and around the camp, often occurring in the presence of police who reportedly failed to intervene Reported victims include reporters from KTV, Fonet, and Insajder, as well as a YouTuber, who were threatened, physically assaulted, or prevented from reporting. Legal experts and former police officials have condemned the authorities’ inaction, noting that it contributed to a climate of impunity and further intimidation of the press.

On 20 August 2025, United Media sent an urgent letter to the OSCE Representative on Freedom of the Media, Jan Braathu, calling on the organization to demand explanations from Serbian authorities over what it described as a “hostile environment” for journalists at N1 and Nova. United Media expressed deep concern that in recent months, President Aleksandar Vučić, senior government officials, and members of the ruling party have repeatedly labelled these news outlets as “terrorists,” “occupiers,” and “media poisoners,” framing them as instigators of unrest.

According to United Media, this rhetoric has fueled more than 30 incidents over the past ten months, ranging from verbal and physical attacks to death threats and interference with reporting, and many such cases remain unresolved. They warned that such language “normalizes hatred, legitimizes violence, and creates a climate in which aggression against journalists becomes acceptable,” and urged the OSCE to publicly condemn the rhetoric, press state institutions to investigate and prosecute those responsible, and remind Serbia of its international obligations to protect media freedom.

==== Reinforcements sent to "Students 2.0" ====
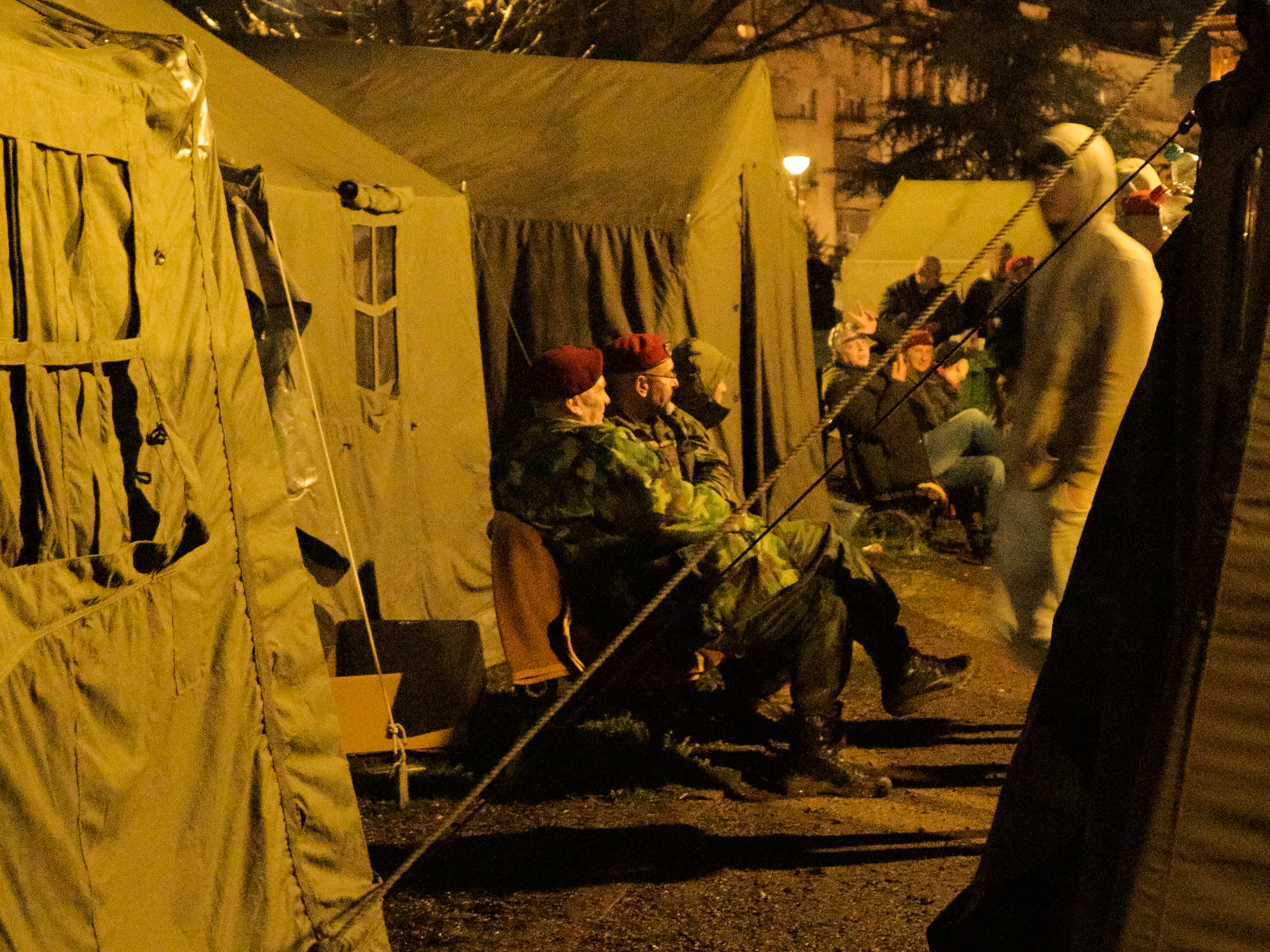
Members of the JSO in the Pionirski park

In the improvised tent camp in Pioneers Park, the pro-government students were replaced by thugs wearing caps and hoods who attacked passersby on at least one occasion; some of these persons were filmed and doxxed. The following day, a group of military veterans from the defunct Special Operations Unit set up tents while wearing green uniforms with red berets. The unit, which was disbanded in 2003, had carried out assassinations of Slobodan Milošević's political opponents and has been accused of involvement in war crimes during the Kosovo war. Among the veterans present was Goran Radosavljević, the last commander of the Special Police Units, and Živojin Ivanović, a JSO commander known also as Žika Crnogorac. A JSO veteran was seen attacking an onlooker with a stick in video footage taken at the park.

On 12 March, professors met at the Faculty of Medicine of the University of Belgrade. After a long and heated debate, they voted in favor of a general strike, which began on 17 March and would last until the students' demands are met. On the same day, near the tent camp in Pioneers park, bypassers were physically attacked by the director of the PUC "Komunalac" from Kula, Marko Pešić, who is also a member of the Kula committee of the SNS.

In solidarity with the students' demands and their protests across Serbia, students and high school students from Valjevo set off on a protest walk to Belgrade in the morning of 12 March to join the "15 for 15" protest on 15 March; they reached Lazarevac in the evening, where they were welcomed by locals and provided accommodation. Students who set off from Kragujevac on foot for Belgrade arrived in Rača on the evening of 12 March. They were met at the entrance by tractor drivers, and given a festive welcome with a folklore performance.

On 13 March, President Vučić asked the pro-government Students 2.0 encampment in Pioneers Park to temporarily withdraw ahead of the protest in front of the National Assembly on 15 March. That same day, a group of about a hundred people, most of whom belonged to the Movement of Socialists, blocked the entrance to the office of the news channel N1. In a parliamentary session, Aleksandar Vulin, an ally of Vučić, confirmed that he had organized the blockade, which lasted for several hours. He added that "it won't be difficult for them to come again." Students travelling to Belgrade on foot from across the country continued their marches.

On 14 March, in the early morning around 150 tractors, most of them without a licence plate, surrounded the Pionirski Park where the "Students 2.0" are located. At the same time, the National Assembly was closed until 17 March due to "safety reasons". In the morning of the same day, all trains were cancelled due to a "bomb threat". The European Public Prosecutor's Office (EPPO), led by Laura Codruța Kövesi, announced that it is investigating potential misuse of EU IPA funds regarding the Novi Sad train station. In the evening, most of the students and citizens finished their marches and arrived in Belgrade. According to the MUP, the arrival of the students was attended by 31,000 people. UN Human Rights Office spokesperson Jeremy Laurence urged the authorities to allow the protest to take place without unwarranted interference.

==== 15. za 15 ====
On 15 March, the "15th for 15" protest (Serbian: 15. за 15, 15. za 15), was held in Belgrade in front of the National Assembly and at Slavija. The protest was attended by thousands of university students, citizens from across the country, and veterans of the 63rd Parachute Brigade. Student organizers ended the protest after bottles and stones were thrown at protesters from the Students 2.0 encampment near the Serbian parliament, leading to brief yet non-violent tension between protesters and the Gendarmery. Around the same time, at 7:11 pm, an LRAD was allegedly deployed on peaceful protesters during a moment of silence for the victims of the Novi Sad collapse. The MUP later denied the allegations in spite of video footage of the incident, as did president Vučić, who called for the prosecution of those "lying" and "spreading disinformation". The Public Prosecutor's Office in Belgrade did not launch an investigation into use of a sonic weapon, instead issuing a statement claiming no indications of its use, citing reports from the Ministries of Defence and Health. The number of people at the protest is disputed: the official government figure provided by MUP was 107,000, an analysis by the Archive of Public Meetings found there were between 275,000 and 325,000 present "with the possibility that the number was even higher," and Božo Prelević, the former MUP minister, estimated there were at least half a million protesters. The protest was regarded as the largest protest in Serbia ever.

In its live coverage of the protest, the pro-government television station Informer TV organized a celebration. The editor-in-chief of Informer, Dragan J. Vučićević and SNS official, Vladimir Đukanović were present in the studio. "There is a special song, can we play it now, on the occasion of this sound cannon. It goes like this: "Wind, blow through the liver", Đukanović asked. "This one is for the sound cannon", said Vučićević while fulfilling his guest's wish.

On 16 March, numerous reports emerged on social media about unusual health symptoms among protesters in Serbia, including dizziness, arrhythmia, hearing loss in one or both ears, and disturbances in pacemakers. Many citizens also suffered orthopedic injuries caused by the sonic weapon. Serbian volleyball player Vanja Grbić initially claimed that his colleague Marko Samardžić had suffered seven heart attacks due to the weapon's effect on his pacemaker but later revised his statement, saying Samardžić had simply fallen ill during the protests. All of these concerns led students to protest on March 17 in front of the Emergency Center, demanding the publication of the exact number of people treated after the March 15 incident.

On 17 March, the Judicial Authority Union announced that all employees of judicial authorities, courts, public prosecutor's offices and penal institutions will go on a one-day strike on 18 March. On the same day, citizens of Obrenovac gathered in front of the municipal building on the main square to express their dissatisfaction after a video of municipal members leaving Belgrade's Pioneer Park was released on social media. The protesters threw eggs at the entrance door of the municipality and its employees. The assistant to the mayor in charge of social activities and education, Dragan Blažić Vivak, was hit in the head with several eggs. Six protesters were arrested after the incident.

On 18 March, in a TV interview, president Vučić said "Faculty professors who do nothing, except participate in blockades, will get potatoes. Tomorrow, I think, this part will be paid out for them. They will get nothing. There is currently joy in millions of homes in Serbia. People do not want anyone to rob them."

On 19 March, several dozen citizens of Sremska Mitrovica gathered in front of the local City Administration building, dissatisfied with the fact that a large number of city officials, including Mayor Branislav Nedimović, falsely presented themselves as students at a camp in Pioneer Park in Belgrade. Many protesters spat on Nedimović. Members of the European Parliament Vladimir Prebilič and Gordan Bosanac from the Greens group addressed a letter to European Commission President Ursula von der Leyen expressing deep concern about her scheduled meeting with President Vučić next week.

On 21 March, a planned SNS meeting in Niš was cancelled after protesters threw eggs at party officials, leading police to blockade the historic building of the Officers Club where the meeting was to be held. Ana Brnabić, Miloš Vučević, and Darko Glišić were supposed to be in attendance; mayor Dragoslav Pavlović, who was also planning on attending, was splashed with water and pelted with eggs. That same day, around 10.000 people attended a commemorative walk in Novi Sad to pay their respects to Vukašin Crnčević, a 19-year-old who died earlier that day from serious injuries sustained four months earlier in the collapse of the railway station canopy in Novi Sad. In Bogatić, protesters threw eggs at the municipality building and at the restaurant owned by the local SNS municipal functionary. That same day, the mother of one of the victim of the canopy collapse informed the public that she had received threats and photoshopped pictures of her dead son because of her support for the protesters; she reported the case to the police, who dismissed these claims.

==== First zbor ====
On 22 March, the first Zbor was announced in Kragujevac. Citizens also organized "Zbor" gatherings, based on the principals of direct vote, in Bogatić, Trstenik, Arilje, Pančevo, Čačak, Vlasotince, Vršac, Zrenjanin, Šid, Novi Sad, Smederevo, Bač, Pirot, Niš, Kragujevac, and several Belgrade municipalities. On the same day, the employees of Pantransport, a public transport company from Pančevo, announced that they will hold a one-day strike on 28 March and stop all transportation on city and intercity lines. The decision was made in support of the students, but also because of the dissatisfaction of drivers who no longer want to transport SNS activists to rallies.

In Čačak, a group of student protesters from the local Technical Faculty were attacked by a group of young, masked men. Hundreds of people protested in response, and some of the protesters stormed the city administration building, but left soon afterwards. That same day, president Vučić told the gathered citizens at the National Theater in Leskovac: "Those police officers who do not want to protect order and the law will be changed, those prosecutors who do not want to protect order and the law will be changed". According to a statement signed by 220 judges and prosecutors in Serbia, "by declaring that those prosecutors who do not protect order and the law will be replaced, the President of the Republic has written a new page in the twelve-year enslavement and humiliation of the judiciary system".

On 23 March, in the Belgrade municipalities of Vračar and Zvezdara, citizens gathered around SNS booths and held a silent vigil for 17 minutes, honoring the victims of the Kočani nightclub fire in North Macedonia, after which they started chanting anti-SNS slogans. The police protected the SNS members until they were forced to leave in the evening.

On 24 March, thousands of protesters gathered in Belgrade to oppose plans to redevelop the former Yugoslav army headquarters, heavily damaged during the 1999 NATO bombing, into a luxury complex financed by Jared Kushner's firm, Affinity Partners. The Serbian government approved a multi-million-dollar contract with Kushner's company in 2024, granting a 99-year lease on the land. Demonstrators demanded the restoration of the site's heritage status and the cancellation of the development project. Opposition to the redevelopment project extends beyond protesters. Serbian architects, engineers, and opposition parties voiced their disapproval, arguing that the site should remain a cultural monument rather than be developed for profit.

On 26 March, students and professors blocked Branko's Bridge in Belgrade for three hours, protesting the pay cuts for the education workers.

On 27 March, pro-government tabloid Kurir published an un-signed op-ed stating: "Stop harassing citizens. It might so happen that the citizens react differently to some future bridge blockades, than they have so far. That those who believed in [pro-opposition sociologist] Jovo Bakić will swim in the river."

On 28 March, students gathered in front of the pro-government TV station Informer, protesting the station's biased reporting and the doxxing of protesters in its live studio program.

On 29 March, students blocking the faculties of the University of Novi Sad announced the route of their planned cycling trip to Strasbourg, with the idea of submitting a document on the violation of rights in Serbia to the European Court of Human Rights.

On 30 March, the Dean of the Faculty of Philosophy in Niš, Natalija Jovanović, who previously expressed her support for the students, was attacked by a woman with a knife, after which she was hospitalised. In the Belgrade district of Žarkovo, a passenger car drove through the crowd during the 16 minute-long silent vigil and injured one person; the driver was arrested. On the same day, protesters in Užice blocked the local motorway; the blockade started with 16 minutes of silence. In Subotica, protesters gathered at the local Hippodrome, where they collected signatures in local communities so they could organize the first residents' assemblies ("Zbor"). From there, the protest participants set off along the Sombor Road; the column was led by tractors and bikers.

On 31 March, students, professors and citizens gathered in Belgrade, Novi Sad and Niš to express their support for the assaulted dean. President Vučić publicly called the dean "a criminal [he] pardoned" and said the dean's injuries were "like a cut you get when cutting a cucumber or an onion".

=== April 2025 ===
==== Tour de Strasbourg ====
On 3 April, 80 students embarked on a 1300 km cycling journey from Belgrade to Strasbourg to deliver a letter to the European Union. The journey, titled "Tour de Strasbourg", was made to raise awareness within Europe about the protests in Serbia. On their way, they were greeted by people on the streets including several major European cities such as Budapest (with the mayor of the city attending), Bratislava and Vienna, in which many Serbian diaspora live. They arrived in Strasbourg on April 15 as planned.

==== Continuation of protests and preparations for the pro-government rally ====
On 9 April, in the evening hours, citizens from several Belgrade municipalities were protesting near Vukov Spomenik when a black Volvo drove through the crowd, injuring an undercover policeman; the driver was later arrested.

The rally of the newly-formed "Movement for the People and the State", announced by president Vučić, was scheduled for 12 April in Belgrade. The news portal Nova.rs obtained an audio recording in which Nataša Marković, a member of the executive board of the state-owned Poštanska štedionica bank, was allegedly heard pressuring employees to attend the rally, telling them that they should support "the state-owned bank which provides their daily bread."

On 10 April, 20 plainclothes police officers entered the building of the Faculty of Medicine in Niš and questioned around 30 students who had blocked the entrance to the higher education institution with benches. The students, who were detained at the Faculty in the afternoon hours, were summoned to give statements at the local Police Department. Citizens gathered in front of the Police Department to show support for the students. Since the blockade continued, the police entered the Faculty building again on the next day. The protesters gathered in front of the Faculty to express their support for the blockade.

During the month of April, a total of 16 Croatian citizens with permanent residence in Serbia, have been declared a "threat to national security" due to their support of the protests on social media and were ordered to leave Serbia; in some cases, these Croatian citizens were de facto forced to abandon their family members, who are Serbian citizens. On 10 April, students organized a protest of support for the deported Croatian citizen, who was forced to leave her husband in Serbia.

On 11 April, students from Jagodina, Ćuprija, Paraćin and Niš arrived in Novi Pazar on foot, as did their fellow students who traveled by bicycle from Belgrade, Novi Sad and Niš. They were welcomed with red carpet by students from the State University in Novi Pazar, a day before the scheduled student protest in that city.

On 12 April, Vučić held his rally "Ne damo Srbiju" ("We will not surrender Serbia") for the new movement with around 55.000 people attending.

==== The blockade of RTS and RTV ====
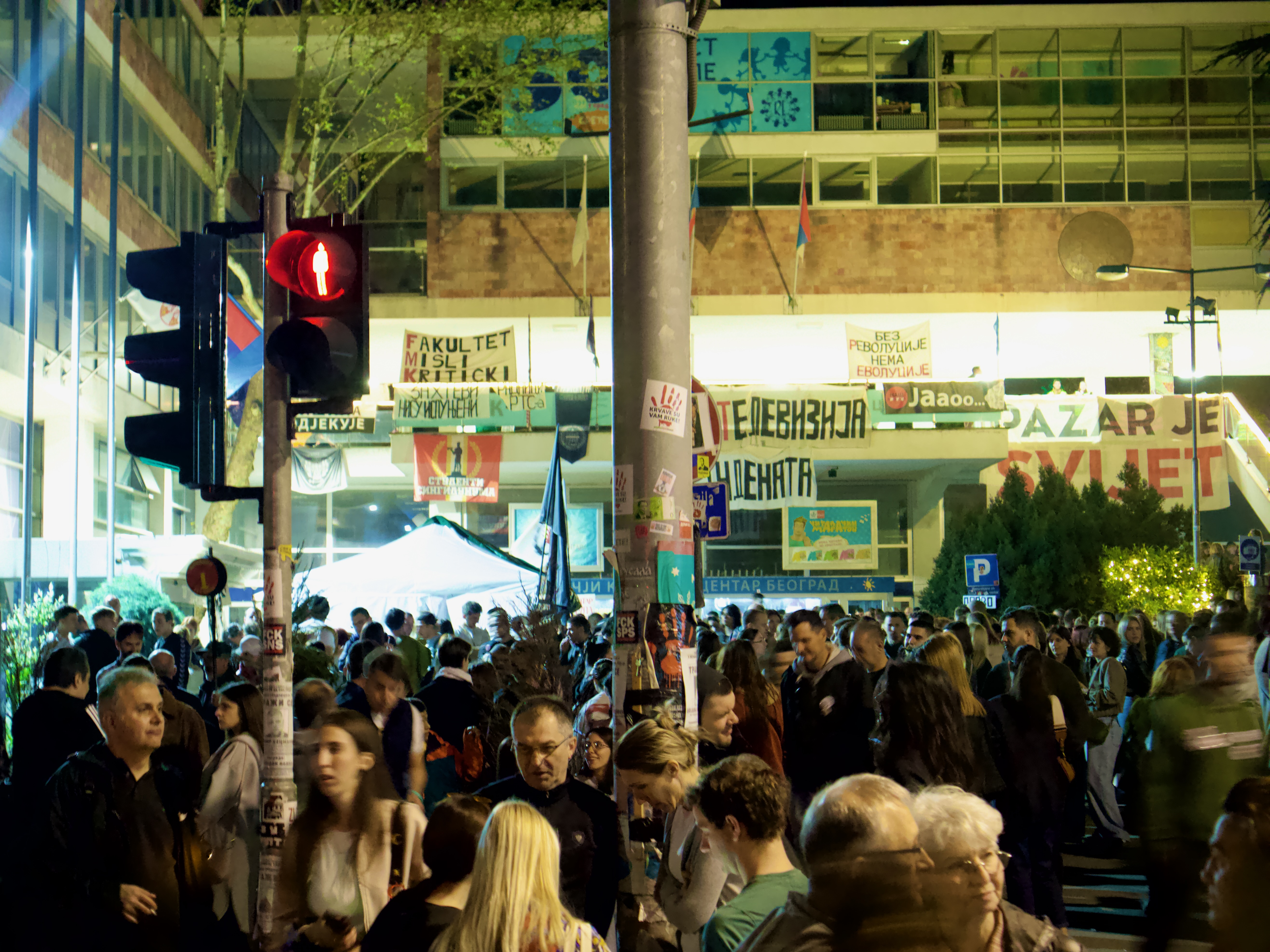
Building of Radio Television of Serbia blockaded by protesters, April 2025

In the evening hours of 14 April, the students called for an immediate action to block two public broadcasters RTS (both studios in Takovska and Košutnjak in Belgrade) and the studio of RTV in Novi Sad because they have not reported about the students cycling to Strasbourg. The main demand for the blockades was REM Regulatorno telo za elektronske medije (The Regulatory Authority for Electronic Media) not having a board since November. The next morning, some journalists were escorted by the police to work through the fast-food place nearby.

On 15 April, as scheduled, the cyclists arrived at Strasbourg where they talked with the representatives of the European commission, giving them letters that detailed the situation in Serbia. They read one letter addressed to French president Emmanuel Macron. Due to the blockades, RTS changed studios and reported from Sremska TV's studio in Šid.

On 16 April, the students announced that they will run from Novi Sad to Brussels from April 26 to May 11. On the same day, a new government was formed with Đuro Macut as the prime minister.

On 17 April, the rector of the University of Belgrade, Vladan Đokić, was summoned to report to the police as a citizen. The summons was issued to collect information in the pre-investigation procedure for the criminal offense of abuse of office. The authorities have repeatedly called for the arrest of the rector Đokić and pointed to his alleged responsibility for the protests. The rector was questioned on 18 April as part of a preliminary investigation; several thousand citizens gathered in support in front of the Criminal Police Directorate building in New Belgrade.

On 19 April, some employees of the RTS organized a Zbor, publicly asking the management of the public service and the relevant departments to urgently contact them and provide clear guidelines for work during the blockade. They stated that "If no one contacts us as soon as possible, we will consider that the management has withdrawn and is unable to manage the public media service. [...] We demand an immediate change in the editorial concept of the RTS news program and professional reporting, in accordance with applicable laws and the journalistic code, which includes reporting on all current events in Serbia, which are of public interest to all citizens."

On 22 April, a welcoming ceremony was organized for student cyclists, participants of the "Tour to Strasbourg", in Novi Sad. Educators, students and citizens gathered in front of the Ministry of Education in Belgrade, to protest the election of the new Minister of Education, Dejan Vuk Stanković. Student gatherings have also taken place in Niš and Kragujevac.

On 23 April, for the first time, opposition councilors of the Gornji Milanovac Municipal Assembly organized and hosted a local celebration of the Municipal Day – a memorial to the Second Serbian Uprising. The gathered citizens also had the opportunity to sign a petition with demands for the abolition of disciplinary proceedings against the local teachers, who took part in protest blockades; a review of the appointment of the new Minister of Education and a reduction in government pressure on the university and school community. On the same day, the plenum of Sremski Karlovci Gymnasium graduates entered into a complete blockade, thereby expressing their solidarity with the students in the fight against corruption and promoting the rule of law in the country.

On 25 April, President Vučić, appearing on Informer TV, said: "I'm afraid that something bad has started to appear within me, in my head, and that is - how to get back at all the people who have caused so much harm to me, my family, my children and everyone. And I can't do that, I can't do that to myself, I fight against it every day."

==== Marathon race to Brussels ====
On 25 April, 21 university students began a relay race from Novi Sad, with the plan being to reach the European Parliament session in 18 days. Their goal is to inform MEPs about the socio-political situation in Serbia.

In Novi Sad, hundreds of high school pupils from Belgrade, Jagodina, Subotica, Užice, Valjevo and Vrbas walked on foot from their respective cities, to join the Novi Sad pupils for a large protests scheduled for the evening of 25 April. The student support rallies continued in Negotin, where the third zbor was also held. In Sremska Mitrovica, citizens held a 16-minute silent vigil and afterwards blocked the local road for 5 hours.

==== Police attempts to disperse faculty blockade in Novi Sad ====
On 28 April, students blocking the Novi Sad faculties, together with gathered citizens, organized an action called "Morning Workout" in front of the Faculty of Sports. They blocked the dean, Patrik Drid, from entering the building. Soon, Drid appeared in front of the building with riot police. Žandarmerija and the Police Intervention Unit in full riot gear began to push back students and citizens who were standing at the entrance to the faculty with shields and batons. Members of the Ministry of Internal Affairs failed to break through the blockade in their first attempt. The gathered citizens called on the police to lower their shields and show that they are with the people. However, Žandarmerija members broke through to the entrance using pepper spray and pushed back the citizens. The police units failed to enter the building, and left the premises soon afterwards. On the same day, citizens gathered in the local Zbor organizations, with the support of the Faculty of Medicine, arrived at the Faculty of Sports, to support the students in the blockade.

On the same day, the controversial bid for the selection of members of the REM Council (regulatory body overseeing the media) was canceled, and a new bid was announced; the student protesters announced that the blockade of RTS facilities was ending after 14 days.

On 1 May, student protesters were joined by the Union of Independent Trade Unions of Serbia (SSSS), the United Branch Trade Union "Nezavisnost", the Association of Free and Independent Trade Unions (ASNS), the United Trade Unions of Serbia "Sloga" and the Confederation of Free Trade Unions. The protest was held in front of the Serbian Government building in Belgrade. The protesters presented demands for amendments to the Labor Law and the Law on Strike.

On 5 May, employees of judicial institutions across Serbia went on strike. The judicial union announced earlier that their demands include decent wages, improved working conditions, clear recognition of the role that administrative and professional staff play in the functioning of the judiciary, and an end to the systematic underestimation of their work.

=== May 2025 ===
==== Demands for early elections ====
On 5 May, the student protesters called for early parliamentary elections, saying that "the authorities are not showing the slightest initiative" to meet their demands. The government that would be formed after the early elections should prepare fair and just conditions for holding next ones, and its mandate should be fixed-term. The students have no leaders and all issues, including appearances in the media, are decided by the plenums. The student protesters announced a unified list of candidates to take part in the elections. Faculties will propose a certain number of their candidates to run for the student list, and each faculty will vet and talk with potential candidates. In Belgrade, where 51 faculties are currently in blockade, the idea is for each to propose two candidates and two reserves. The sorting algorithm will guarantee compliance with the Law on Gender Equality. The candidate names are kept secret until the elections are officially announced. The opposition parties which supported the call for early elections are: Green-Left Front, Democratic Party (DS), Ecological Uprising, Kreni-promeni, PSG. The People's Movement of Serbia had been advocating for early elections even before the students' demands.

On 9 May, Novi Sad zbors organized a street blockade at 30 locations throughout the city, demanding local elections. On 10 May, several zbors in Kragujevac organized a protest, urging the authorities to fix the derelict local overpass. On 11 May, graduates of the Zemun Gymnasium announced that they have physically blocked the school due to non-compliance with the agreement regarding the end of the school year, which, they claim, was adopted at the teachers' council. The decision to block was made at a plenum held on the same day.

==== Clashes in Kula ====
On 20 May, in Kula, a protest was held on the plateau in front of the Kula Municipality building, during which a banner with the inscription "Your colour revolution has failed", which had been placed on the building earlier by SNS members, was removed from the Kula Municipality building and set on fire. At the same time, SNS supporters gathered in a nearby park, in front of the party premises. The gatherings were peaceful at first, but the situation escalated into a verbal conflict and afterwards into a physical confrontation. Police units in riot gear separated the opposing sides, however, at one point, SNS sympathizers used fireworks aimed at the protesters.

=== June 2025 ===
==== Vidovdan protests ====
On 28 June, which is the date of Vidovdan, one of the largest protest gatherings was held in Belgrade with an estimated 140,000 people in attendance according to independent monitors, although official figures reported around 36,000. After speeches were held at Slavija Square in the afternoon, student organizers gave citizens approval to initiate social, political, and moral action, clarifying that it was not a call for violence but rather an encouragement not to remain passive in the face of injustice.

Following the speeches, demonstrators marched towards the National Assembly, where clashes broke out with police. At least 77 protesters were detained, of whom 38 remained in custody facing criminal charges. The confrontations were widely described as an instance of police brutality, reminiscent of the 2020 protests.

On 29 June, in response to the previous day's events and what protesters described as inadequate police conduct, demonstrations escalated into acts of civil disobedience. Protesters set up barricades using improvised objects such as fences, containers, and tires, repeatedly crossed pedestrian walkways, held impromptu protests on major roads, and in some cases pelted offices of the ruling Serbian Progressive Party with eggs. The barricades initially emerged in Zemun, where the student group based in Belgrade declared: "Zemun reacts. It's time for all municipalities to organize. Civil disobedience." Similar actions soon spread to other parts of Belgrade and across Serbia, including road and bridge blockades organized as part of a decentralized campaign of student-led disobedience. Protests also spread outside the capital, with solidarity blockades and demonstrations reported in Novi Sad, Kragujevac, and other towns, where local communities—including farmers, veterans, and civic groups—joined students in erecting barricades and roadblocks.

On 30 June, Serbian police moved to clear barricades erected by protesters throughout Belgrade. Metal fences and garbage containers placed in areas such as Zemun were dismantled, with several dozen demonstrators being detained; video footage showed riot officers carrying a young man into a police van by his arms and legs. Protesters repeatedly rebuilt roadblocks and attempted to sustain their actions by walking across pedestrian crossings to disrupt traffic even after police removal efforts. The wave of civil resistance continued into 1 July, when a court released eight students who had been charged with plotting to "overthrow the state", pending trial. Roadblocks and demonstrations persisted despite the legal developments.

=== July 2025 ===
On 2–3 July, reports indicated that police in riot gear attempted to enter the Faculty of Law at the University of Belgrade—detaining approximately 23 students. Former rector Branko Kovačević condemned the action as a clear violation of the institution's legally guaranteed autonomy. The police, however, denied entering faculty premises, asserting that they respected university autonomy.

Across several cities—Belgrade, Novi Sad, Niš, and Novi Pazar—the police continued to suppress protests. On 3 July, at least 79 demonstrators, including university students, were detained during the break-up of roadblocks. Human rights groups and the Council of Europe expressed concern over alleged excessive use of force, arbitrary arrests, and numerous injuries sustained by demonstrators.

In early July, the city of Užice became one of the focal points of the protest movement. On 6 July, around 350 citizens broke through a police cordon and sat on the main road linking Požega with Zlatibor. Two people were arrested that evening, prompting citizens to gather in front of the local police station. The following day, 7 July, a large protest drew participants from Užice and nearby towns such as Požega, Kosjerić and Čačak, who again broke through police and gendarmerie lines to block the highway toward Zlatibor. After the occupation of the road, police forces eventually withdrew, though seven more people were later arrested on charges of violent conduct. On 13 July, thousands from across Serbia gathered in Užice under the slogan "Serbia, Užice is calling you". The protest, which was peaceful, included a speech by University of Belgrade rector Đokić, and blocked the highway toward Zlatibor. This time, police did not intervene. The following day, the Užice court overturned the detention orders, releasing all of those arrested.

Reports from the Vidovdan-related protests detailed testimonies of protesters who sustained serious injuries during police interventions, such as broken bones and head trauma allegedly caused by gendarmes and plainclothes officers. Between 28 June and 14 July, hundreds of arrests and numerous injuries were recorded across several Serbian cities. Legal experts criticized the police for disproportionate use of force, failure to properly identify themselves, and violations of arrest procedures. Observers also highlighted a broader pattern of impunity for police violence, noting that Serbia had previously been found liable in multiple European Court of Human Rights rulings that resulted in compensation to victims but no criminal accountability for individual officers.
