= List of protests and demonstrations in Serbia by size =

Mass protests have occurred throughout Serbian history, particularly in the late 20th century and 21st century, reflecting civic engagement and mobilization around social, political, and environmental issues.

== List ==
This list includes Serbian protests with at least 100,000 participants, ordered by peak protestor turnout per event.

Rank	Name	Attendance	City	Date	Issue	Notes
1	15th for the 15	275,000—325,000	Belgrade	15 March 2025	Novi Sad railway station canopy collapse	Mostly regarded as the largest protest in Serbian history.
2	You and Me, Slavija	180,000	Belgrade	23 May 2026	Novi Sad railway station canopy collapse, seeking a call for elections	
3	Meet Me on Sretenje	169,000	Kragujevac	15 February 2025	Novi Sad railway station canopy collapse	Largest protest in Serbia outside of Belgrade ever.
4	Final Student List Pre-election Rally	150,000	Belgrade	22 October 2026	2026 Serbian parliamentary election	
5	See you on Vidovdan	140,000	Belgrade	28 June 2025	Novi Sad railway station canopy collapse, seeking a call for elections	
6	Sretenje protest	100,000	Belgrade	22 December 2024	Novi Sad railway station canopy collapse	
7	Overthrow of Slobodan Milošević	80,000—120,000	Belgrade	5 October 2000	Primarily Electoral fraud in the 2000 Yugoslavian general election and international sanctions against Yugoslavia	Largest protest ever in Serbia up until 2025.
8	Commemoration for the Victims of the Canopy Collapse	80,000—110,000	Novi Sad	1 November 2025	Novi Sad railway station canopy collapse, seeking a call for elections	Largest protest in Vojvodina ever.
