= Timeline of the 2024–2026 Serbian anti-corruption protests (January–November 2026) =

Timeline ofv Serbian anti-corruption protests

The period between January and November of 2026 in the 2024-2026 Serbian anti-corruption protests was marked by a slower pace than the previous year with fewer protests and a focus on the electoral campaign. On 9 September, Aleksandar Vučić called for snap parliamentary elections, and resigned on 27 September. Students in blockade formalized their political articulation by creating the citizens' group "Student List - Students are Winning".

== Timeline of Events ==
=== January 2026 ===
On January 17th, the students held a rally called "What will victory mean" where they presented their plan for fighting corruption.

On January 21st, after professor Jelena Kleut was fired, the students of the Philosophy Faculty in Novi Sad blockaded their faculty building, which ended in a police raid. European Democrats critiqued the raid telling Vučić that he's "not off the radar". Minister of internal affairs, Dačić, claimed the raid was lawful and done in line with procedure.

On January 27th, the students held a rally called "Knowledge is power", in which the students condemned the bad state of education in Serbia. Rector Vladan Đokić blamed the SNS government for this.

=== February 2026 ===
On February 15th, the students held a rally for statehood day in Serbia.

=== March 2026 ===
On the 26th of March, a student of the Philosophy faculty in Belgrade jumped off the 5th floor of the faculty building. This caused a police raid of the faculty on the 31st of March, which caused public outrage as the police isn't allowed on university property by law unless they need to address an immediate threat. The police was accused of using the suicide of a student to raid the faculty with no probable cause. The police reportedly found flares, first aid kits, food, walkie-talkies and gas masks, which was the faculty's blockade inventory. First aid kits and walkie-talkies are often used by students during protests to organize security and first aid teams. The police also confiscated most computers at the faculty, however they found no incriminating evidence according to the rector's lawyer. Vučić called the raid "pure violence" towards the police. The EU ambassador in Serbia called for the suicide not to be politicized.

On the 27th of March, local elections occurred in 10 municipalities. Independent observers reported that the elections were riddled with irregularities, and CRTA gave them a rating of "bad to very bad". Many cases of voter intimidation and vote buying were recorded, with government sponsored thugs attacking voters in the late afternoon. In Kula the difference between the student list and SNS was less than 600 votes, but in the end the repeat voting gave all 10 municipalities to SNS.

=== May to September 2026 ===
On the 23th of May the students organized the fourth rally at Slavija, which was also the largest gathering of 2026. Independent reviewers estimated around ~180.000 people attended the rally.

On the 27th of June, SNS held a rally of their own. The ministry of internal affairs estimated around 200.000 people attended the rally, however independent reviewers put the number around 30 thousand.

On the 9th of September, Vučić called for snap parliamentary elections and set them for the 25th of October. The same day, citizens group "Student List - Students are Winning" was registered, and the students announced various rallies all over the country where they would incrementally reveal their political program.

On the 12th of September, the student list started collecting signatures for their electoral campaign. In Serbia for a list to qualify for the elections they need to collect 10 thousand valid signatures from citizens. SNS and SPS had already collected their signatures over the previous 2 days. The students' signature collecting campaign was incredibly successful, with kilometer-long queues forming just so citizens would show their support. This process was significantly slowed down by the fact that many notaries refused to work with the students. In the end the student list collected about 69 thousand valid signatures, while SNS collected around 300 thousand. By being the third list to reach 10.000 signatures, the students got the number three spot on the ballot, which was used heavily in their campaign. Most other insignia and symbols were replaced with the number three, songs containing the number three became a signature of the campaign and the three finger salute was used heavily.

On the 22nd of September, the government started paying out monetary aid of 6.000rsd per person. This was seen by many civil groups as a form of electoral campaign.

On the 27th of September, Vučić resigned, and handed over the powers and the duties of the office to Ana Brnabić.

=== October 2026 ===
On the 21st of October, six people were arrested for allegedly seeking to cause unrest during election day. The government accused "foreign powers" and Croatia of being involved.

On the 22nd of October, the students held their final rally. Independent reviewers estimate about 110.000 people attended. A few days before the rally, four crowds of students started marching towards Belgrade, arriving on the 21st of October, where they were met with fireworks and red carpet.

On the 25th of October, election day was marked by incredibly high voter turnout. The students mobilized around 16.000 election observers and officials, and an unknown amount of "mobile teams" which were coordinated teams of people focused on suppressing election fraud. Around 16h, heavy police and thug presence was noted around the parliament building and around Ćacilend. There were a few localized incidents of mobile teams clashing with local thugs, and a few SNS call centers were raided by the students' mobile teams. These call centers were allegedly involved in voter blackmail and other fraudulent activities.

At 21:31, Aleksandar Vučić conceded defeat, saying that the results from their representative sample indicated that they would have around 15 seats in parliament less than the student list. Most cities in Serbia erupted in celebration, with people leaving their cars in the middle of the street to run out and celebrate. In most cities, SNS electoral material was burned in the streets, in Novi Sad a long-standing billboard of Vojislav Šešelj which said "Fatherland Serbia, motherland Russia" was burned. In Belgrade, Ćaciland and the accompanying tents and fences were removed that same night and the thugs and police were chased out of Pioneer's park. In the coming days, on the students' request, the citizens organized to clean the park and return it to its original state. Many similar cleaning and restoration actions were carried out by the citizens' assemblies in the following days.
