= Timeline of the 2024–2026 Serbian anti-corruption protests (August–December 2025) =

The period between August and December of 2025 in the 2024-2026 Serbian anti-corruption protests was marked by a sudden escalation of the protests through conflicts with the police in dozens of towns across Serbia, and then a sudden drop in tensions as the student movement started pushing for snap parliamentary elections. Most university blockades ended in this period, but the students assured the public that their fight is "not over" and that they are preparing for something "much bigger", likely implying the formation of the Student List.

== Timeline of Events ==
=== August 2025 ===
On 1 August 2025, by order of the Public Prosecutor's Office for Organised Crime, a major arrest operation was launched in connection with the Novi Sad canopy collapse. Former Minister Tomislav Momirović was among 11 individuals detained on suspicion of corruption related to the reconstruction works of the station and the wider Budapest–Belgrade railway modernization project. In a televised broadcast, Vučić publicly raised concerns about what he described as "selective justice" and accused the head of the Organised Crime Prosecutor's Office of acting at the behest of unspecified "Europeans."

Beginning on 12 August, anti-government protests in Vrbas and Bačka Palanka turned increasingly confrontational. Demonstrators were attacked by masked groups wielding pyrotechnics, bottles, and rocks—the police only minimally responded to these attacks. According to the Civil Rights Defenders, "police actively protected masked goons who brutally attacked citizens with iron rods, flares, rocks, and truncheons," while at times officers themselves engaged in excessive force instead of maintaining public order.

These events sparked a wave of unrest across Serbia. From 14 to 16 August, amid rising repression, protests escalated with demonstrators demolishing offices of the SNS, SPS, and SRS, first in Novi Sad, then across the country—often clashing directly with police protecting these sites. Protesters spray-painted, vandalized, and defaced party buildings, while riot police deployed tear-gas and forcefully dispersed crowds. Injuries were reported among at least five officers and numerous civilians, and arrests occurred nationwide.

In a controversial move, members of the military police unit Cobras were deployed to protect the SNS office of party leader Miloš Vučević in Novi Sad. Legal experts warned that such a deployment breached military neutrality laws by politicizing the armed forces. Seven Cobras were reportedly injured in the ensuing clash, and one officer fired a warning shot into the air.

Valjevo became the scene of one of the most violent episodes of the protests when police forces carried out a large-scale crackdown against civilians. Video footage showed groups of officers kicking and beating a man lying on the ground, who was later assaulted again while in custody. Dozens of people were dragged out of taxis, bakeries, betting shops, and other premises and beaten, while rubber bullets were reportedly fired near groups of minors. Witnesses stated that boys as young as 15 were assaulted, including one who was kicked and struck by at least ten officers while lying on the pavement. The city hospital treated around sixty injured individuals, four of them with serious injuries, while police reported 19 of their officers injured and confirmed 17 arrests, several of them underage. Interior Minister Ivica Dačić later claimed that he had "spent hours trying to identify" the minor allegedly beaten in Valjevo, ultimately concluding that no individual matching the widely circulated footage could be located in hospital or police records—a move he used to challenge the validity of earlier reports. Following this, protesters razed the SNS office to the ground and set fire to municipal and judicial buildings. The demonstration, sparked by allegations of police brutality, drew several thousand participants.

During the crackdown across Serbia, a female student alleged she was subjected to a violent assault by the commander of the protective unit, Marko Kričko, who reportedly struck her, slammed her head against a wall, threatened rape, and destroyed her personal belongings while holding her on the floor for hours.

Western outlets increasingly focused on allegations of police brutality. The Guardian documented the aggressive use of force and tear gas during crackdowns in Belgrade, while Radio Free Europe reported that the initially peaceful protests had devolved into daily clashes fueled by perceptions of systemic state violence. An editorial by The Guardian called on the EU to urgently prioritize Serbia's democratic crisis in light of these "widespread reports of police brutality," warning that silence could destabilize the region.

=== September 2025 ===
On 1 September, a silent march was held by high-school students in Belgrade in memory of the victims of the canopy collapse. Similar marches were held in Kragujevac and Novi Sad. On 5 September, police fired tear gas and charged at protesters demanding free elections and Vucic's resignation during a rally in Novi Sad.

On 6 September, the 2025 edition of the Belgrade Pride march was held, which included banners featuring slogans of the student movement and the phrase "Gays against police state!".

=== October 2025 ===
A nationwide march was held on 1 October to commemorate 11 months since the Novi Sad canopy collapse.

On 13 October, the physical blockade of the Fifth Belgrade Gymnasium by school students began. The reason for this is the unprofessional and incompetent management of the gymnasium by acting director Danka Nešović for several months. The students demanded her immediate dismissal, as well as the return of professors whose employment contracts were not extended.

On 14 October, the acting director of the Fifth Belgrade Gymnasium, Danka Nešović, declared that the school is under a "state of siege". Minister of Education Dejan Vuk Stanković spoke out, saying that the blockade of the school was an act of violence and pressure.

On 22 October, the European Parliament adopted a resolution condemning the growing wave of repression in Serbia, calling for sanctions against high-ranking officials accused of violence and human rights violations. They called to account for undermining democratic institutions, spreading pro-Russian propaganda and using the judiciary to suppress dissenting opinions. Concern was expressed about the Serbian government's attempt to weaken independent media that report objectively. The authorities have been called to fully clarify the case of the canopy collapse, and to sanction those responsible. Camp "Ćaciland" was highlighted as illegal.

On the same day, a person attacked Ćaciland, setting fire to some of the tents in front of the House of the National Assembly. The authorities and institutions pointed out that the attacker was part of the student uprisings, and that the case was an act of terrorism. However, it is believed that the attacker is close to the government, and that the event was planned in advance to divert attention away from the adoption of the European Parliament resolution.

=== November 2025 ===
The commemorative gathering in Novi Sad on the anniversary of the train station canopy collapse was held on 1 November. An estimated 110,000 people were present.

On 2 November, Dijana Hrka, the mother of Stefan Hrka, one of those killed in the collapse of the canopy, started a hunger strike in front of the National Assembly, i.e. the tent-settlement of Ćaciland, from which a group of people who support the government and live there started their daily provocations. Despite peaceful gatherings of citizens in support of Dijana, people from Ćaciland pelted protesters with pyrotechnics, chairs and lasers and played loud "patriotic" music until late at night, after midnight.

On 10 November, bus driver Milomir Jaćimović, who regularly transported people to protests for free, also went on hunger strike with his son, because the police confiscated two of his vehicles while he was transporting people to a protest in support of Dijana Hrka in Belgrade.

On 17 November, Dijana Hrka ended her hunger strike in front of the Assembly.

On 20 November, a physical attack on N1 television reporters occurred in front of the Ćaciland tent-settlement by an unknown person who destroyed the camera and physically attacked the cameraman. The police did not react to the attack.

On 22 November, a protest was held, marking one year since the attack on the students of the Faculty of Dramatic Arts (FDU) in Belgrade. The protest column moved from FDU, through New Belgrade, Branko's Bridge, the Palace of Justice, all the way to the building of Radio Television of Serbia (RTS).

On 24 November, a protest was held in front of the Assembly in support of N1 television and its reporters who were attacked a few days before.

On 30 November, local elections were held in Mionica, Sečanj and Negotin. Numerous irregularities were noted, and the Serbian Progressive Party (SNS) won in all three municipalities with a significant drop (up to 30%) compared to the previous elections.

=== December 2025 ===
In December 2025, the Serbian student movement and broad-based public protests entered a strategic transition, shifting focus from civil disobedience and university blockades toward grassroots electoral mobilization.

On 2 December 2025, the student coalition under the banner "Students in Blockade" (*Studenti u blokadi*) released a joint manifesto titled "Get Involved, Declare Victory" (*Uključi se, raspiši pobedu*). The manifesto announced that the autumn lull was a period of restructuring, formally demanding early parliamentary elections and outlining plans to form a nationwide civic front to pressure the government.

On 10 December 2025, the Rectorate of the University of Novi Sad issued an official public statement addressing the ongoing tensions. While the administration called for a thorough and transparent judicial investigation into the Novi Sad station disaster, it explicitly opposed the continuation of faculty blockades and class disruptions. This statement drew pushback from student unions, while counter-student groups filed administrative complaints against university deans in Belgrade and Niš for facilitating the blockades.

On 15 December 2025, student representatives held a joint press conference outside the National Assembly in Belgrade, formalizing their demand for the immediate dissolution of parliament. They declared that their upcoming nationwide actions would serve as a precursor to organizing citizen election monitors.

On 28 December 2025, a decentralized nationwide protest took place across more than ten municipalities in Serbia, including Belgrade, Novi Sad, Niš, Kragujevac, and Subotica. Coinciding with the Mother's Day holiday (*Materice*), demonstrators gathered at designated petition booths under the slogan "Leave a Signature, Get Involved, Declare Victory." Thousands of citizens signed a public petition calling for immediate early elections, which student leaders described as a field exercise for voter turnout and election observation in 2026.
