= Timeline of the 2024–2026 Serbian anti-corruption protests (November-December 2024) =

The period from November to December 2024 in the 2024–2026 Serbian anti-corruption protests is considered the very beginning of the student and citizens' movements. It was marked by the Novi Sad railway station canopy collapse in which 15 people died and two were heavily injured. The initial citizens' protests often ended with violent clashes and vandalism, and an action called "Serbia, stand still" (Serbian Cyrillic: Застани, Србијо, romanized: Zastani, Srbijo), in which people would block certain intersections and hold vigils for 15 minutes every day at 11:52, was gaining popularity. This culminated on the 22nd of November when the students of dramatic arts were attacked by government hooligans during one of those vigils. This attack caused the students to organize a blockade of the faculty of dramatic arts. Over the following weeks all faculties in Serbia started blockades of their own, and by the end of the year many high schools joined in as well. The blockades were intended to last until all 4 of their initial requests were fulfilled, these being: release of all documentation regarding the railway station reconstruction, arrests of the officials responsible for the collapse, freeing all students arrested during the protests and increasing the education budget by 20%. This period was marked by few protests, the focus was instead put on organizing the movement internally.

== Timeline of Events ==
=== November 2024 ===
Early protests primarily took the form of quiet vigils for victims of the collapse. These protests became larger and more visible demonstrations over time, with protesters accusing police and local authorities of negligence and corruption. Protesters began demanding a transparent investigation into the collapse and the release of documents related to the incident. The Associated Press suggested that the collapse also served as a flashpoint for expressions of dissatisfaction with the Serbian government as a whole.

President Aleksandar Vučić, Minister of Construction Goran Vesić and pro-government news outlets initially claimed the canopy was never reconstructed, despite videos and images posted online that showed Vesić opening the reconstructed Novi Sad Railway Station. Faced with accusations and public outrage, Vesić announced his resignation, but stated that he "does not feel responsible".

Some initial demonstrations escalated to vandalism, with the Novi Sad City Hall being a primary target. Red paint was thrown on the city hall entrance and attempts were made to breach the building. Law enforcement responded with tear gas and arrests, further inflaming tensions. Protesters suggested that these and other violent demonstrations were the result of government plants seeking to derail the protests.

On 20 November, the Minister of Trade Tomislav Momirović resigned from his position due to the protests. In his resignation letter, he pledged his "eternal loyalty to president Vučić".

On 21 November, Vladimir Đukanović, a high-ranking member of the ruling Serbian Progressive Party (SNS), commented negatively on the protests on his Twitter account, stating that "[w]e must fight against anarcho-terrorists, fake commie intellectuals, [and] the pseudo-elite that is ravaging Serbia with anti-Serbian attitudes. It is time to stop this social scum. In every place and at every step. First of all, in every discussion, and God forbid, if necessary, with force. This scum will no longer be able to terrorize this country. Long live Serbia and just fight bravely". On the same day, former Minister Vesić was arrested along with 11 unspecified persons. He was released after six days and kept his party rank within the SNS.

On 22 November, students and professors of the Faculty of Dramatic Arts gathered in the immediate vicinity of the Faculty to pay homage to the fatalities in Novi Sad. The meeting was announced to the authorities in accordance with the law. At the gathering, both students and professors were attacked by an organized group. Some of the attackers were allegedly high-ranking officials of the SNS. After the attack on 25 November, the students began an occupation of the faculty in protest. They were soon joined by the Faculty of Philosophy in Novi Sad, and the Faculty of Philosophy, the Faculty of Philology, the Faculty of Natural Sciences and Mathematics, and the Faculty of Political Sciences in Belgrade.

A November demonstration in Novi Sad drew 20,000 protesters, making it the largest protest within Novi Sad in decades. Demonstrators held weekly 15-minute traffic blockades on Fridays at 11:52 am, the time of the collapse. Cars occasionally rammed protesters during these blockades.

On 22 November, the students and citizens of Leskovac, in southern Serbia, organized a protest. It started with 15 minutes of silence in honor of the victims of the canopy collapse. The protest was attended by the mayor of Leskovac, Goran Cvetanović of SNS. The mayor later retracted his support, calling the protesters "students with bad grades" and shared their school grades with the public, in violation of Serbian data protection laws.

In late November, an audio recording was leaked to the press of the alleged voice of Vojvodina assemblyman Damir Zobenica advising other party members to insult and attack the protesters blocking the roads. Zobenica resigned after the leak.

=== December 2024 ===
On 1 December, a silent protest was held in Novi Sad to commemorate one month since the collapse. On the same day, President Aleksandar Vučić publicly announced that those who asked for the arrest of the car driver who intentionally rammed into the protesters were "out of their minds", because "the driver was just going on his way".

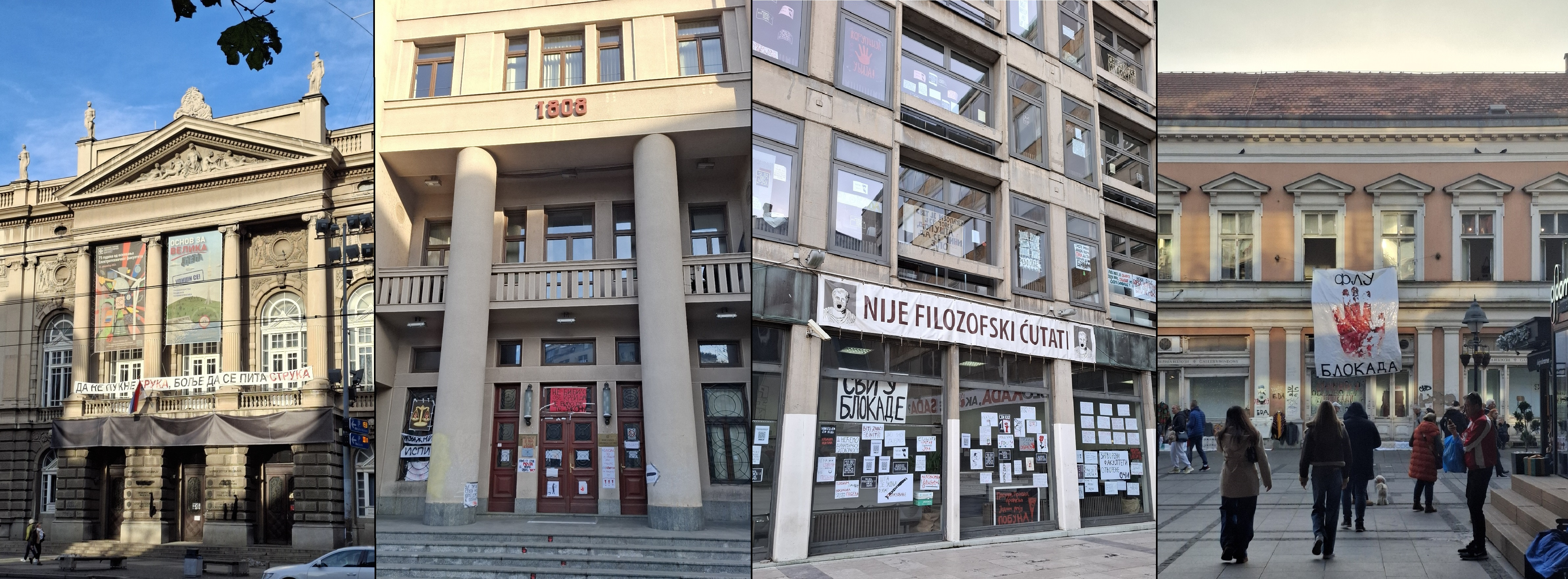
Campuses in Belgrade blocked by students, left to right: School of Electrical Engineering, Faculty of Law, Faculty of Philosophy, and Faculty of Fine Arts.

By early December, Serbian students had begun organizing 24-hour blockades at some school campuses. By mid-December, more than 50 university campuses (including the three biggest universities of Belgrade, Novi Sad and Niš) and multiple secondary schools had suspended classes due to student protests.

On 5 December, the Bar Association of Serbia announced that affiliated lawyers would organize a one-day strike on 11 December because of "systematic and long-term interference by the executive branch in the work of the judiciary branch and violation of the principle of separation of powers in a democratic society", along with the lack of accountability in the Novi Sad collapse investigations.

On 6 December, during a 15-minute blockade in downtown Belgrade, a car rammed into the crowd, injuring four members of the Belgrade Philharmonic Orchestra that were protesting. The Orchestra condemned the attack and the driver was arrested.

On 11 December, students demonstrated at the headquarters of the public television station RTS, for their broadcasting of President Aleksandar Vučić's claims that demonstrators are being funded by Western countries who seek to destabilize Serbia. The same day, Vučić promised that all prosecutorial documents related to the disaster would be publicized, announced that all protesters held in jail were released, and pledged to pardon any protesters if they were convicted at trial. While the concessions marked the first time since Vučić's rise to power in 2012 that any concessions were made to protesters, they did not include the protest's calls for his resignation.

On 12 December, in Čačak, students of the Faculty of Technical Sciences and the Agronomic Faculty organized a protest, which began with 15 minutes of silence.

On 13 December, farmers in central Serbia blocked Ibar Highway with tractors. That same day, in Novi Sad, a group of four hooligans attempted to ram their Porsche Cayenne vehicle and physically attacked the protesters. The attackers were later arrested; one was revealed to be an active duty police officer.

On 15 December, in a TV interview, Prime Minister Miloš Vučević said that "you can't bring down a country because of 15 people who died, nor 155, nor 1,555". Vučević later apologized for his remarks.

On 17 December, high school students in Mladenovac commemorated the victims of the canopy collapse with 15 minutes of silence.

On 19 December, commenting on the involvement of high school students in the protests, Vladimir Đukanović, a high-ranking official of the SNS, stated that "children are property of the state until they reach the age of majority". The statement generated controversy, with the Commissioner for the Protection of Equality, Brankica Janković, describing his remarks as "utterly unfounded, dangerous, and condemnable". Đukanović defended his statement by claiming it was "metaphorical" and "taken out of context".

On 20 December, the silent protest was extended by one minute to commemorate a victim of the Zagreb school stabbing in Croatia.

In response to police brutality and alleged paid hooligans who attacked civilians and protesters, opposition leaders, students, farmers and independent demonstrators organized a large-scale protest on 22 December, at Slavija Square in Belgrade. The estimated attendance was between 100,000 and 102,000 people, which marks the biggest protest in Belgrade and Serbia by attendance in history.

In an 24 December interview, Vučić stated that "if [he] wished so, [he] could send out the Cobras on the students and they would throw them around in 6–7 seconds". This statement was widely ridiculed, causing the students to make memes making fun of Vučić and his phrase "throwing around" ("razbacati"). The Cobras do not have the authority to disperse crowds.

On 25 December, people brought 1,000 letters to the office of the public prosecutor Zagorka Dolovac urging her to "start doing her job". That same day, employees of the Serbian intelligence agency BIA paid an unofficial visit to the mother of one of the student organizers at her workplace. She interpreted this move as a "threat" and as "pressure". Other organizers allegedly received telephone calls inviting them to come to BIA offices "for a friendly chat", but no official summons were handed. In the evening, over 2,000 people protested in Užice, in front of the city hall. The local authority, staffed by SNS members, turned off the street lights in front of the hall, but were turned on when the protestors brought a portable power generator.

=== Announcement of "loyalist faction" ===
On 27 December, protesters blocked a road in Ivanjica, causing a driver to ram his car into the crowd. Once his vehicle stopped, the gathered protesters attacked him, however he was immediately protected by undercover police standing nearby and allowed to leave the area without legal repercussions. That same day, 200 employees of RTS signed a petition in support of the protests.

On 29 December, Vučić publicly accused eight Croatian students from FER, who were visiting their fellow students in Belgrade, of organizing the protests on behalf of the Croatian intelligence agency SOA. The names of the Croatian students were published without their consent in the pro-government media and, upon leaving Serbia, they were given alcoholic beverages with a note to "send their regards to SOA" by the Serbian border police. Croatian prime minister Andrej Plenković described Vučić's claim as "laughable".

On 31 December, Vučić announced the formation of a "loyalist faction" within the SNS, whose "17,000 members swore a blood oath in secrecy", who are "pro-Russian oriented" and are "a bit too extreme for [his] taste". He also revealed that his brother is among the members. It is unclear whether this was directed towards the protesters or the more reluctant members of SNS, whereas others expressed doubt that Vučić could have gathered 17,000 loyal activists. A group of citizens signed a petition demanding an official police investigation into the existence of these loyalists.

Similar to the 1996–1997 Serbian protests, silent protests in Belgrade and Novi Sad were held on New Year's Eve, but this time from 11:52 pm to 00:07 am. According to some estimations, between 17,000 and 18,000 attended in Belgrade, while between 4,600 and 6,000 attended in Novi Sad.
