= Genčić Family House =

Coordinates: 44.8051°N 20.4707°E

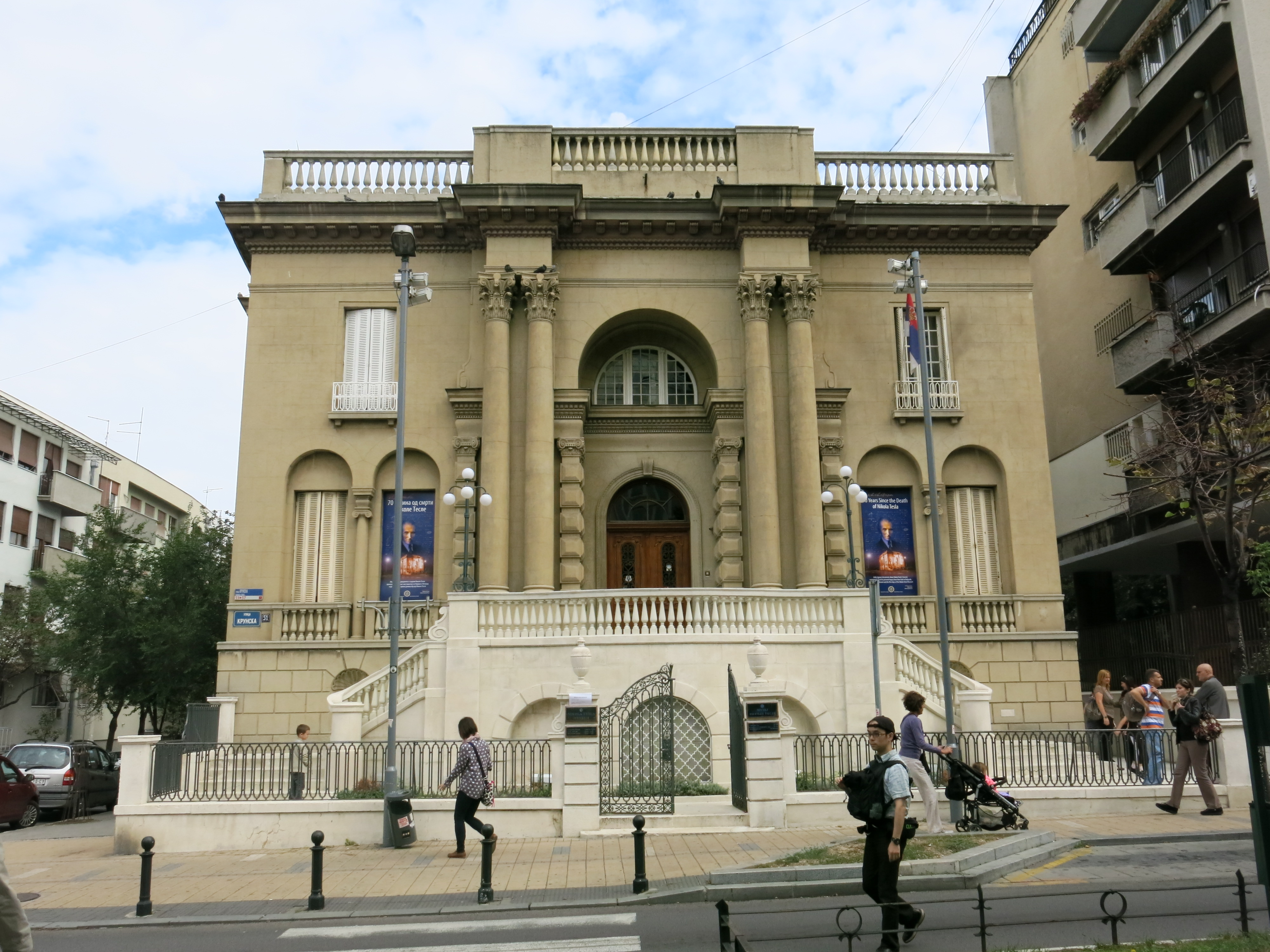
The house

The Genčić family house (Serbian: Генчићева кућа у Београду, romanized: Genčićeva kuća u Beogradu) in Belgrade, at 51 Krunska Street, was built in 1929 and has housed the Nikola Tesla Museum since 1952.

== Đorđe Genčić ==
The house was built as the family house of Đorđe Genčić, an industrialist and a politician, the witness and the actor in the political life of Serbia in the last decades of the 19th century.

== The Architecture ==
The house was built between 1927 and 1929, after the design by an architect Dragiša Brašovan who, in the early 1920s moved from Budapest to Zrenjanin and Belgrade. Along with his colleagues Milan Sekulić and M. Petrović – Obućin he founded a design and construction bureau "Architect". Before this villa, Brašovan designed and realized several prominent buildings in Belgrade which made him very famous builder of private houses in Belgrade, and beyond.

The villa Genčić is situated on the corner of Prota Mateja Street and Krunska Street. The construction of the house started in June 1927, and ended in December 1929. The house was conceived as a cubic mass, with the academically divided facade, dominated by the entry part, designed in the form of a triumphal arch. By its architectural and stylistic features, the house belongs to the group of houses where architect Brašovan began the process of a gradual modernization of the academic forms, particularly evident in the equal treatment of all the facades of a particular building. The facade was enlivened with a regular arrangement of window niches and pairs of double columns with Ionic capitals. The balance of masses and the reduced decoration suggest a closer relation with the modern architectural expression.

As far as the interior is concerned, in the ground floor there were a dining room, a kitchen, a salon and a lot more space for the guests' reception. Upstairs, there were bedrooms, a study and a bathroom. All the rooms were grouped around the central hall facing Prota Mateja Street, which spread all the way to the first floor. The construction works were assigned to the bureau of the engineer Milan Jovanović and Radomir Zlatičanin. The initial design was altered during the construction process, mostly because the location of the building was in a certain disproportion with the entrance parts which demanded larger pre-garden. The building remained a private family house until it was confiscated by the new communist government of Josip Broz Tito.

== Nikola Tesla Museum ==
The Nikola Tesla Museum has been situated in the house since 1952. The Museum is dedicated to the life and work of the famous world scientist, and his scholarly and personal legacy.

== See more ==
List of Monuments of Culture in Belgrade
