= Metropol Palace Hotel Belgrade =

Hotels in Belgrade, Serbia

Metropol Palace Hotel
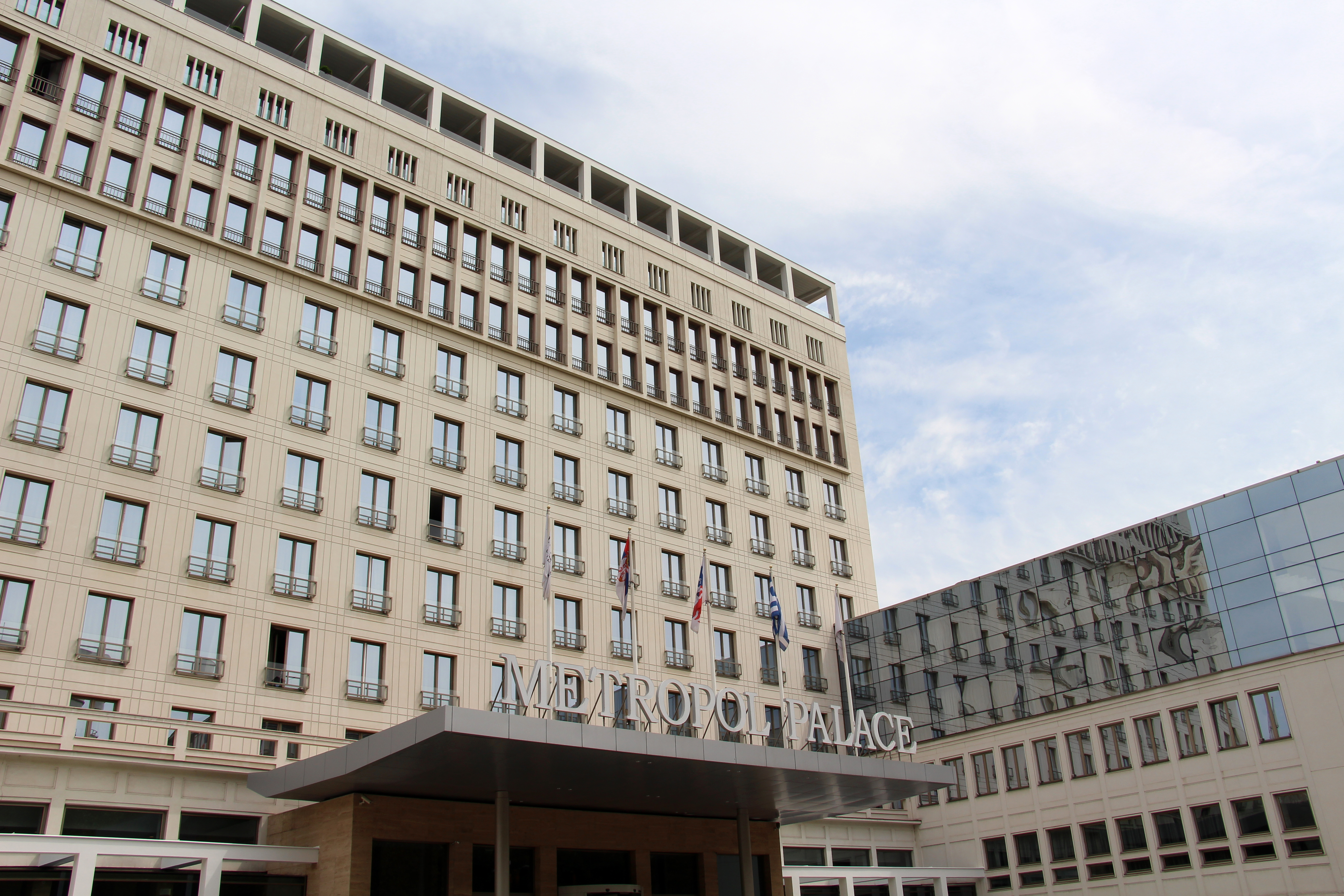

- Location within Belgrade
- Former names: Hotel Metropol (1957–2007)
- Hotel chain: The Luxury Collection

General information
- Location: Tašmajdan, Belgrade, Serbia, 69 Bulevar kralja Aleksandra
- Coordinates: 44°48′24″N 20°28′26″E
- Opening: 20 August 1957; 68 years ago
- Cost: 70 million euros (27,4 million – purchase in 2006 + over 40 million – reconstruction 2008–12)
- Owner: Sheraton Sofia Hotel Balkan

Technical details
- Floor count: 10
- Floor area: 28,000 m^{2} (300,000 sq ft)

Design and construction
- Architect: Dragiša Brašovan

Other information
- Number of rooms: 199
- Number of suites: 40
- Parking: three-level underground garage with 100 spots

Website
- www.metropolpalace.com

Hotel Metropol Palace, until 2007 known as Hotel Metropol (Serbian: Хотел Метропол), is a five-star hotel in Belgrade, the capital of Serbia. The hotel was opened in 1957 and the building, projected by Dragiša Brašovan, has been declared a cultural monument in 2001.

== Location ==
The hotel is located at the corner of the Bulevar kralja Aleksandra and Karnegijeva street, in the municipality of Palilula.

== History ==
=== Congress Center ===
During the Interbellum, the lot was planned for the University Center, which ultimately wasn't built. Projected as the House of the Central Committee of the League of Communist Youth of Yugoslavia after the war, the building was originally envisioned as the "largest congress center in the Balkans". Construction was part of the vast program of the Youth work actions and began in the summer of 1949. Some 15 youth brigades, with 18,000 people, were employed at the construction site but the works ceased in November 1950. The building was envisioned as the massive structure, which was to have a pedestrian pathway to the Saint Mark's Church, and to "dominate this part of the city" as the "etalon of the new architecture's superiority".

=== Hotel ===
After the idea of the congress center was abandoned, architect Dragiša Brašovan revised the plans and adapted the structure as the highrise hotel. Construction works were continued in 1954 and, though they were finalized in 1958, the hotel was opened for guests on 20 August 1957.

The building was declared a cultural monument in 2001. In 2002 a major fire broke out at the hotel, completely destroying the two last floors. The rest of the hotel, however, remained open until 2008.

=== Famous guests ===
In the 1960s and 1970s the Metropol was one of the most popular and elite venues in Belgrade and President of Yugoslavia, Josip Broz Tito, organized his New Year's Eve celebrations in the hotel. During the First Summit of the Non-Aligned Movement in 1961, a reception was organized for 30 heads of state or government and over 3,000 guests. VIP guests included:

- politics: Haile Selassie, Gamal Abdel Nasser, Jawaharlal Nehru, Nicolae Ceaușescu, Leonid Brezhnev, Habib Bourguiba, Che Guevara;
- literature: Ivo Andrić;
- film and theater: Anthony Quinn, Brigitte Bardot, Vittorio de Sica, Gina Lollobrigida, Elizabeth Taylor, Sophia Loren, Jack Nicholson, Kirk Douglas, Robert De Niro, Judith Malina, Julian Beck, Bernardo Bertolucci, Melina Mercouri, Roman Polanski, Alfred Hitchcock;
- chess: Bobby Fischer, Tigran Petrosian, Mikhail Tal, Boris Spassky;
- astronauts: Neil Armstrong, Buzz Aldrin;
- music: Igor Stravinsky, Louis Armstrong, who was awaited by numerous fans for hours, but he would slip through the back doors. Ipe Ivandić who died after falling from a hotel window.

Celebrating re-opening of the hotel and the 55th anniversary, an exhibition was held in the renovated hotel in October 2012 and a monograph on the hotel's history, "History of the five stars" was published. Among other data, it contains photos of celebrity guests and anecdotes on their time in Metropol.

=== 2008–2012 reconstruction ===
In 2006, the hotel was purchased by the "Sheraton Sofia Hotel Balkan" for 27,4 million euros. The complete reconstruction of the edifice, worth over 40 million euros, began in 2008 and was halted twice in the next 4 years. No work has been done at all from 2009 to September 2011 with the various reasons given: European debt crisis, bad relations within the family company which acquired the hotel but the unofficial stories that the Metropol has been resold also circulated. In 2011 the owners promised that the works will be finished in 2012. Additional pressure were the newly adopted penalties for the investors who do not "beautify edifices in the city's priority touristic zones" by June 2013. Penalty amount by the law, colloquially called "the tax on ugliness", was set at 2 million euros.

The hotel was temporarily opened in June 2012 as the five-star venue under the name Metropol Palace. It began to receive guests on 9 September 2012 while some works remained in progress until the end of the year. On 15 October 2012, the Metropol Palace joined The Luxury Collection.

The architecture bureau DOMAA, situated in Belgrade, was in charge for the reconstruction of the hotel Metropol Palace. The chief architect and the author of the reconstruction was architect Miodrag Trpkovic, job captain – architect Jasmina Djordjevic and assistant to the job captain was architect Srdjan Gavrilovic. Main arch. technician was Dragana Dimitrijevic.

== Architecture ==
The Metropol is known for its specific, white façade, the large stained glass window and the mosaic. Due to the protection as the cultural monument, they were not to be changed during the reconstruction but they were fully restored. In front of the hotel is the fountain with the sculpture "The girl takes a shower". The lobby has marbled floor and a large wall painting made from the inlayed pieces of differently colored wood. It was especially ordered by Brašovan for the hotel in 1956.

The hotel had a total floor area of 28,000 m^{2} (300,000 sq ft) which was enlarged to 30,000 m^{2} (320,000 sq ft) after the 2012 reconstruction. The reconstructed hotel has several restaurants, spa, fitness center, sauna, steambath, massage center, gym and the meeting halls with the capacity of 1,000 guests. An underground, three-level garage with 100 parking spots was built so as the bar on the hotel's flat roof. There are 199 rooms, 130 in the main body of the building while 69 rooms and 40 suites are in the so-called annex, the eastern extension. The suites include the presidential and the royal ones.

== Gallery ==
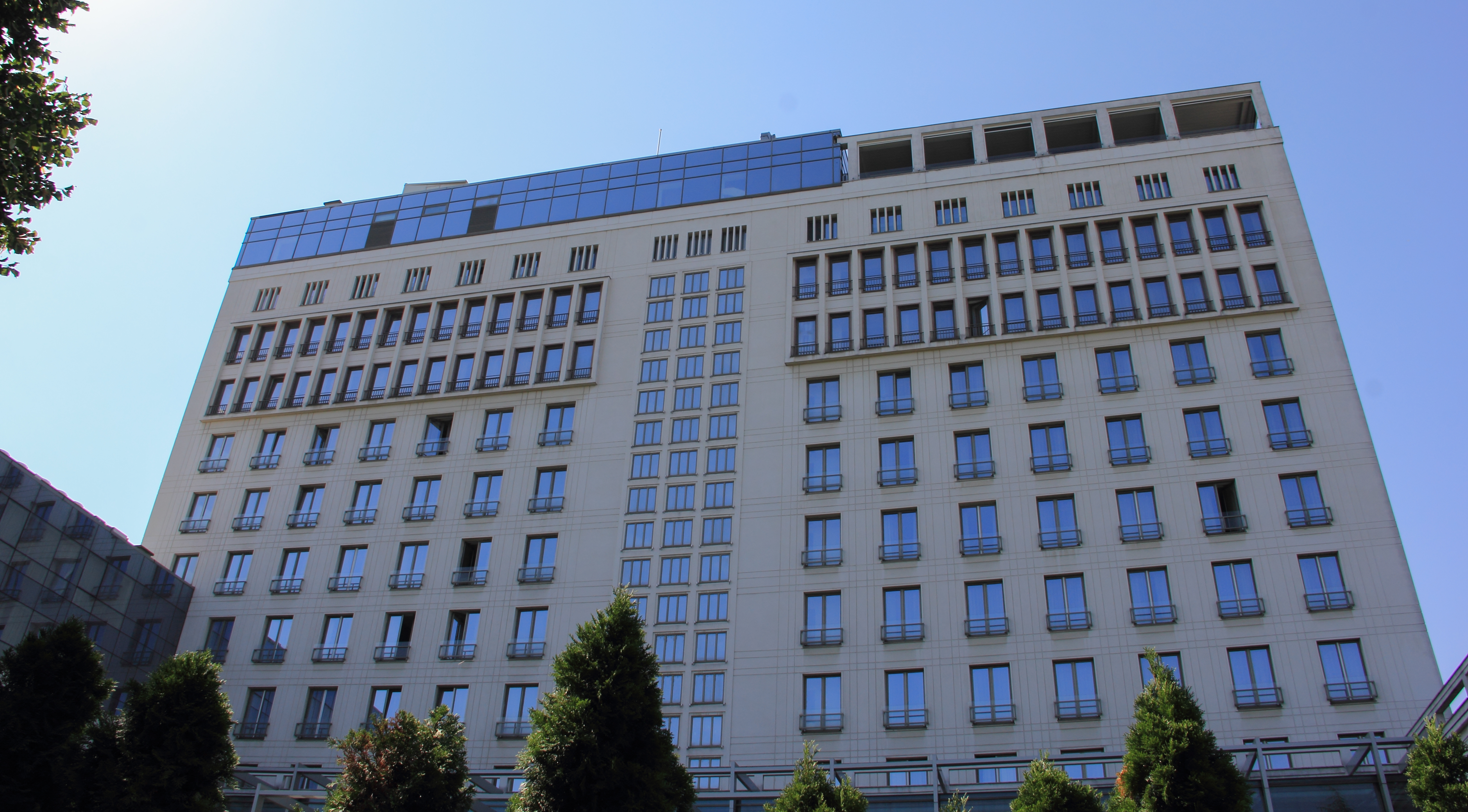
Hotel facade, 2023

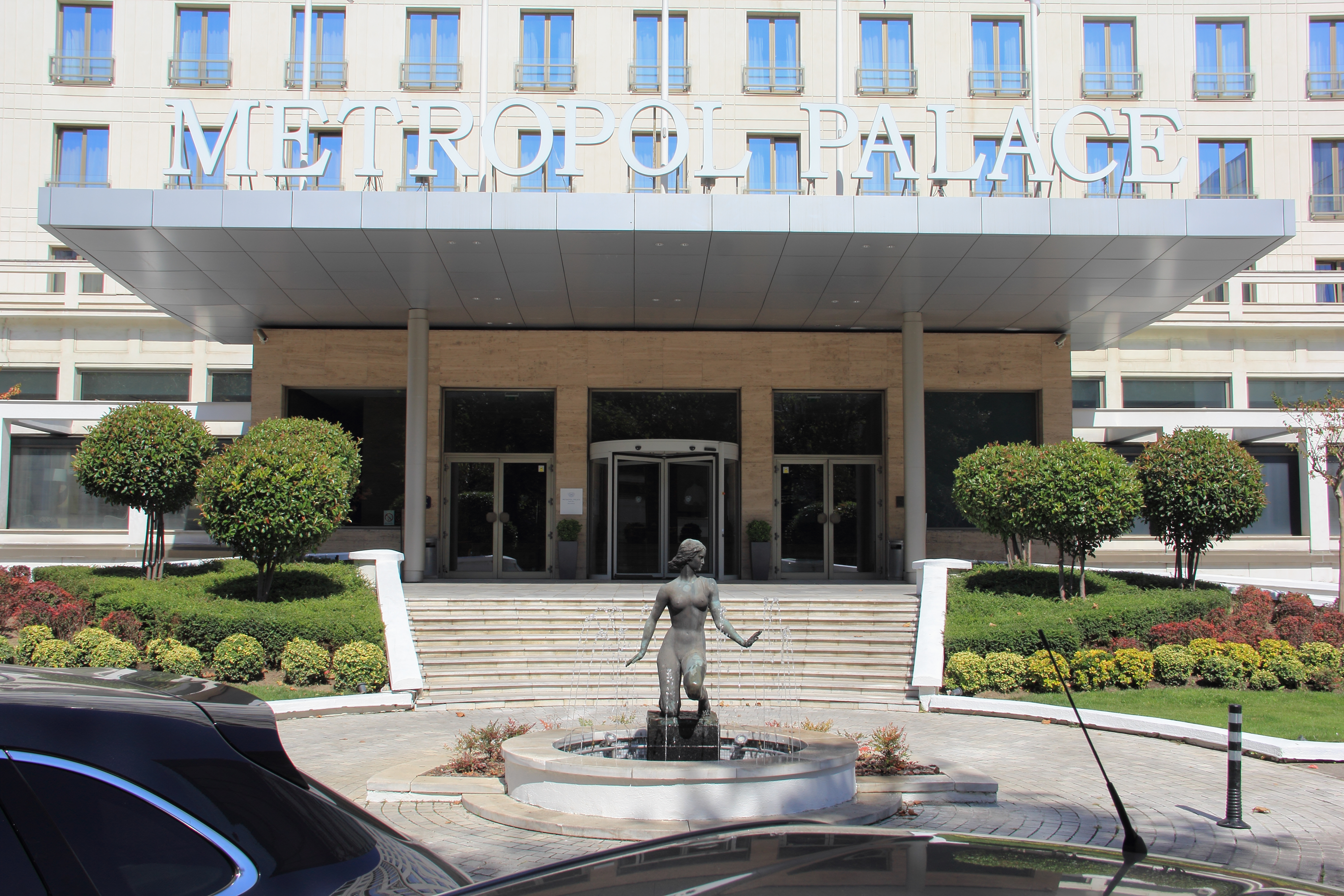
Hotel entrance

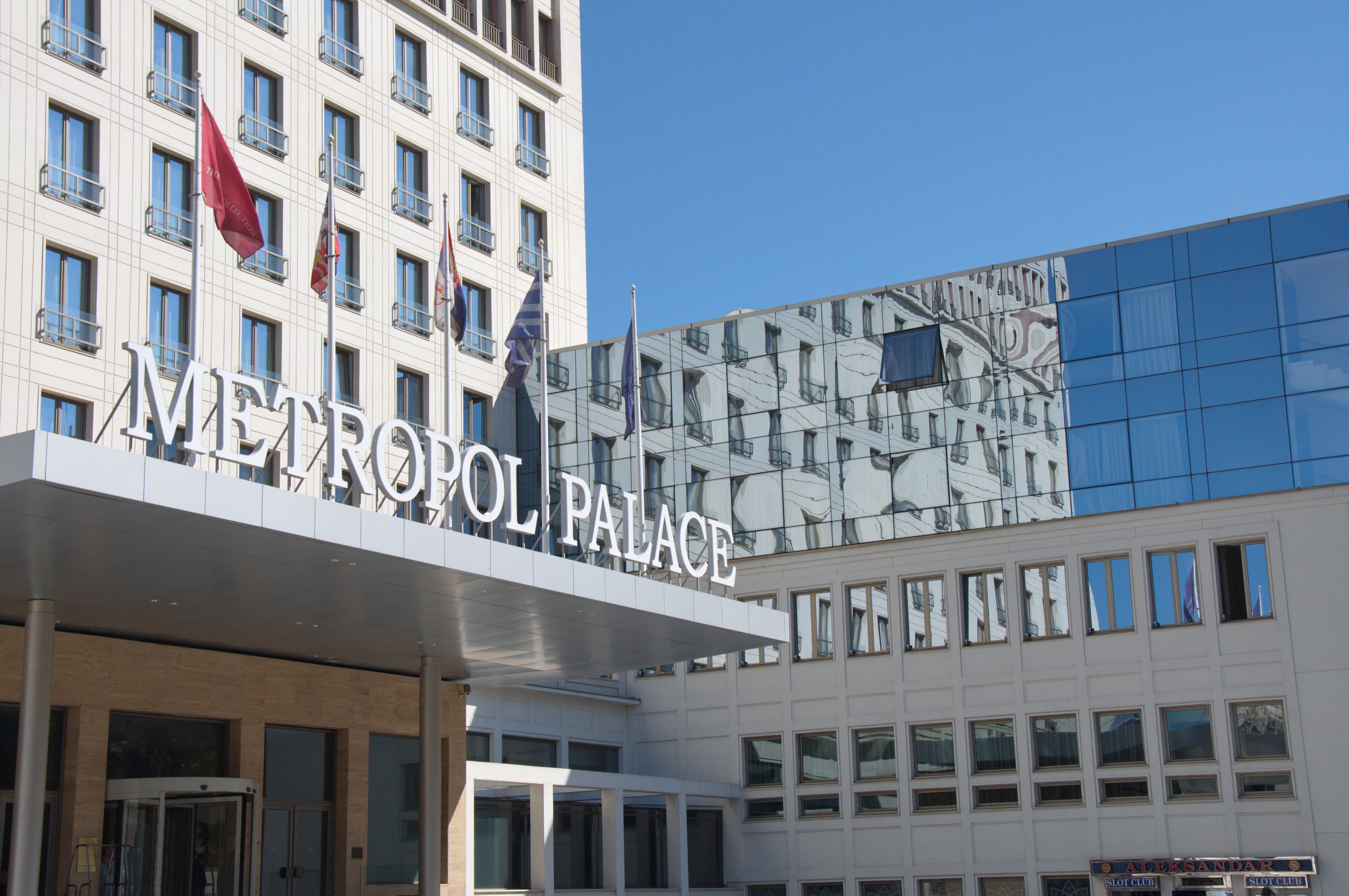
Hotel name

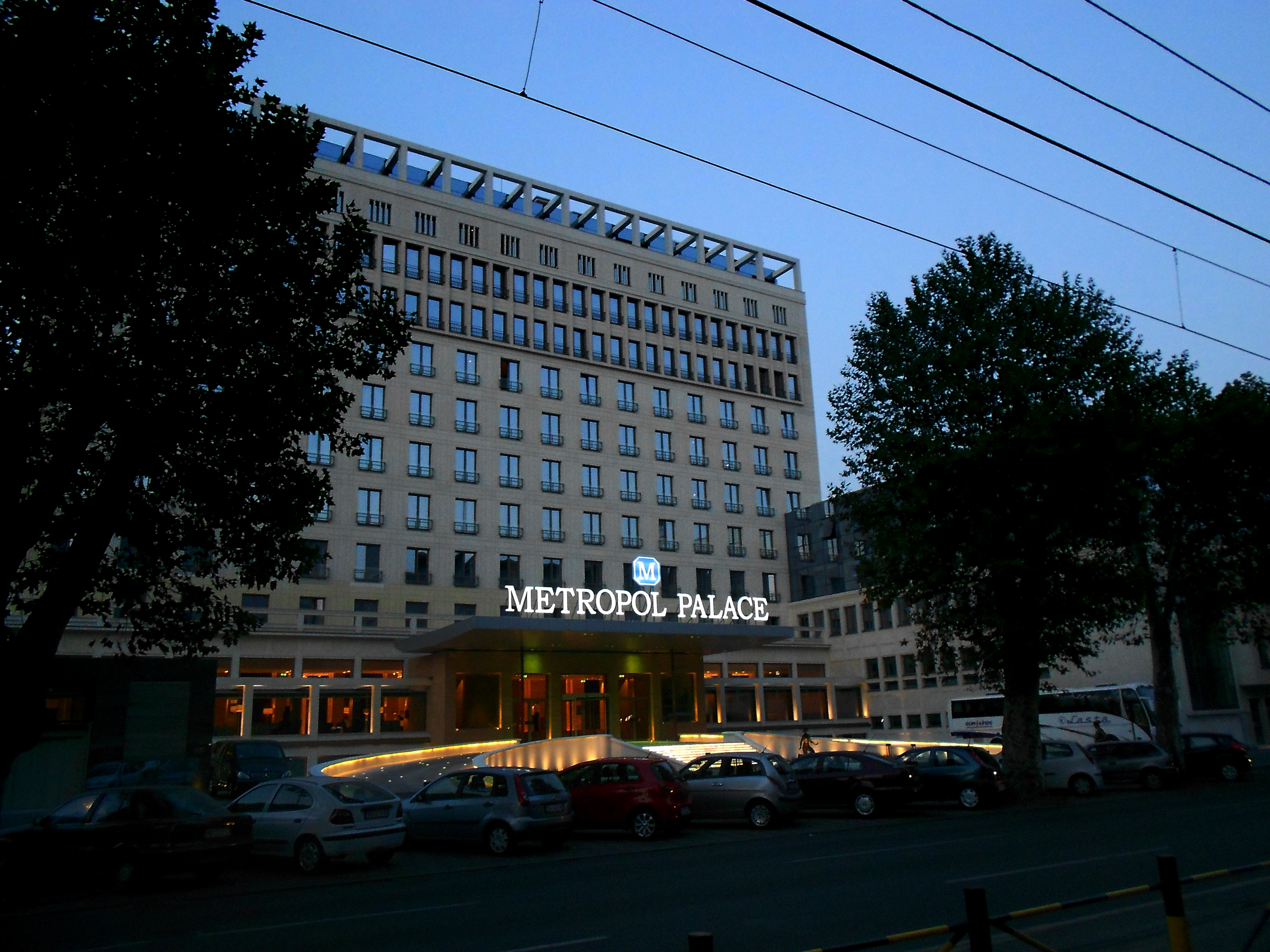
Hotel at dawn

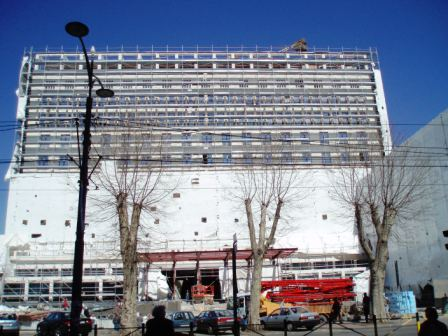
Hotel during renovations, 2012
