= Nikola Tesla Museum =

Science museum in Belgrade, Serbia

Nikola Tesla Museum Музеј Николе Тесле
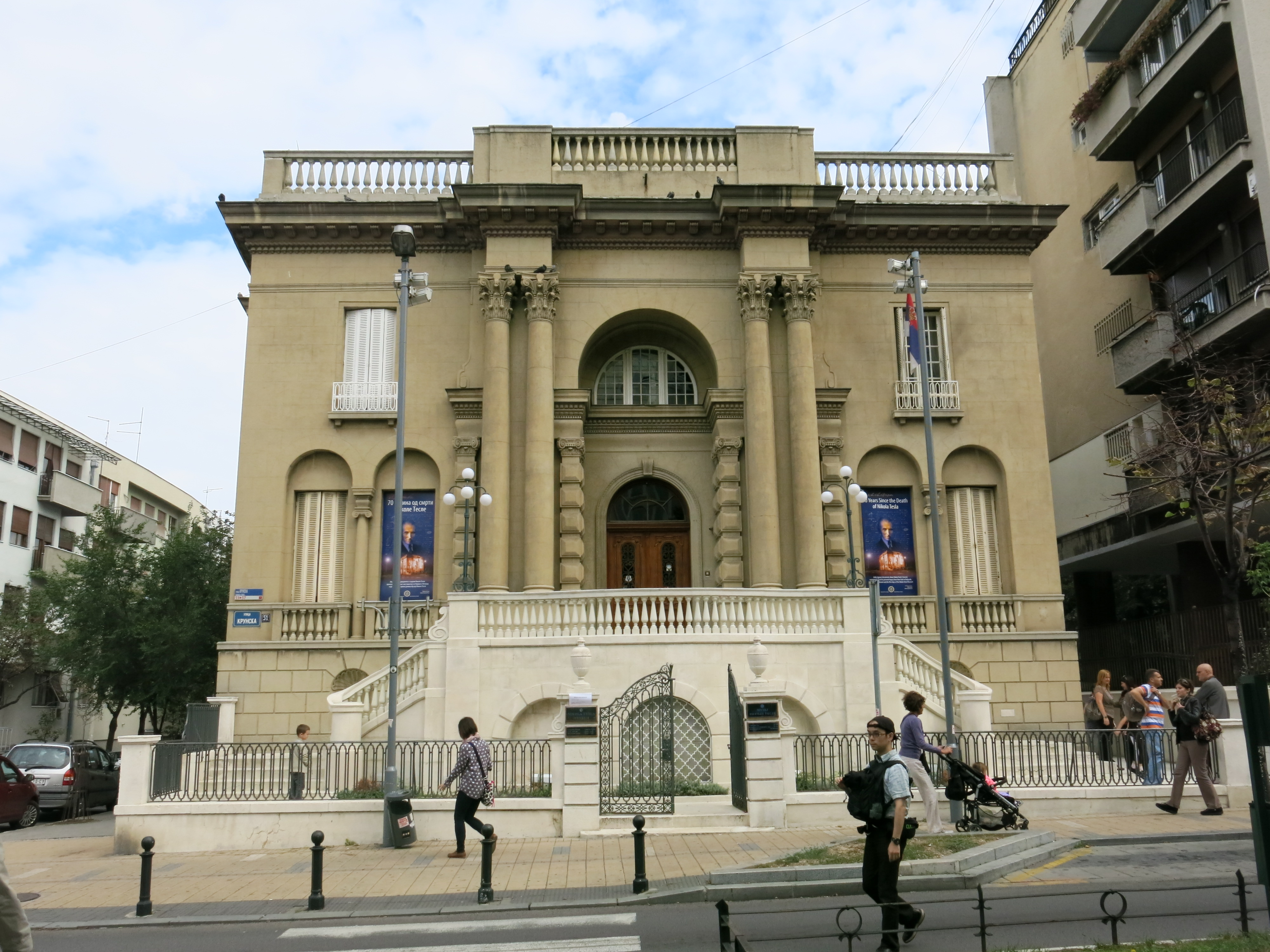
- View of the front of the museum
- Established: 5 December 1952; 73 years ago
- Location: Krunska 51, Belgrade
- Coordinates: 44.8051°N 20.4707°E
- Type: science museum
- Visitors: 120,000 (2017)
- Director: Ivona Jevtić
- Curators: Bratislav Stojiljković; Ivana Ćirić; Ivana Zorić; Vladimir Perić
- Website: tesla-museum.org

The Nikola Tesla Museum (Serbian: Музеј Николе Тесле, Muzej Nikole Tesle) is a science museum located in Belgrade in Serbia. It is dedicated to honoring and displaying the life and work of Nikola Tesla as well as the final resting place for Tesla. It holds more than 160,000 original documents, over 2,000 books and journals, over 1,200 historical technical exhibits, over 1,500 photographs and photo plates of original, technical objects, instruments and apparatus, and over 1,000 plans and drawings. Very little is on display in the small ground floor exhibition space.

The Nikola Tesla Archive was inscribed on UNESCO's Memory of the World Programme Register in 2003 due to its critical role regarding history of electrification of the world and future technological advancements in this area.

== History ==
The Nikola Tesla Museum is housed in a residential villa built in 1927 for Đorđe Genčić, according to the designs of Serbian architect Dragiša Brašovan. Following its confiscation by the new communist authorities in 1945, the building was used for various purposes until December 5, 1952, when the Nikola Tesla Museum was founded in accordance with the decision of the Government of the Federal People's Republic of Yugoslavia. Certain items for the museum were shipped from New York City to Belgrade in Serbia, then part of Yugoslavia, on September 7, 1951, as a result of efforts by Sava Kosanović, Tesla's nephew and closest relative, and his attorney Philip Wittenberg.

=== Exhibitions ===
The permanent exhibition was arranged in 1955. It consists of four rooms on the ground floor. From time to time there have been some modifications, but for many years the basic concept has remained the same. Its first part is primarily a memorial exhibition, while the second part is an interactive one, with 3D computer generated models of Tesla's inventions. From time to time, the museum organizes thematic exhibitions of documents, photographs and other material in order to display some periods from Tesla's inventive life.

=== Reconstruction ===
Reconstruction of the Tesla Museum started on November 3, 2006. The first phase of the project was scheduled to have been complete by the end of 2006. The garden on the roof of the museum was designed to be enclosed by glass windows, which would turn the roof into a computer room. This reconstruction is now complete, and the museum is available to visit.

== Gallery ==
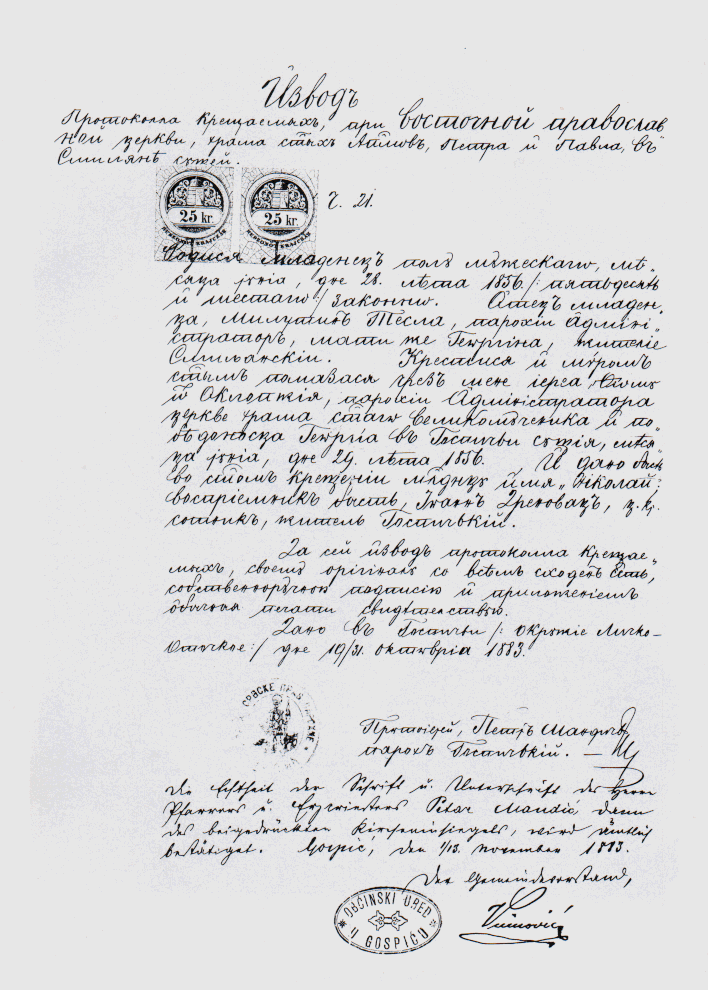
Baptismal record of Nikola Tesla, c. 24 July 1856.

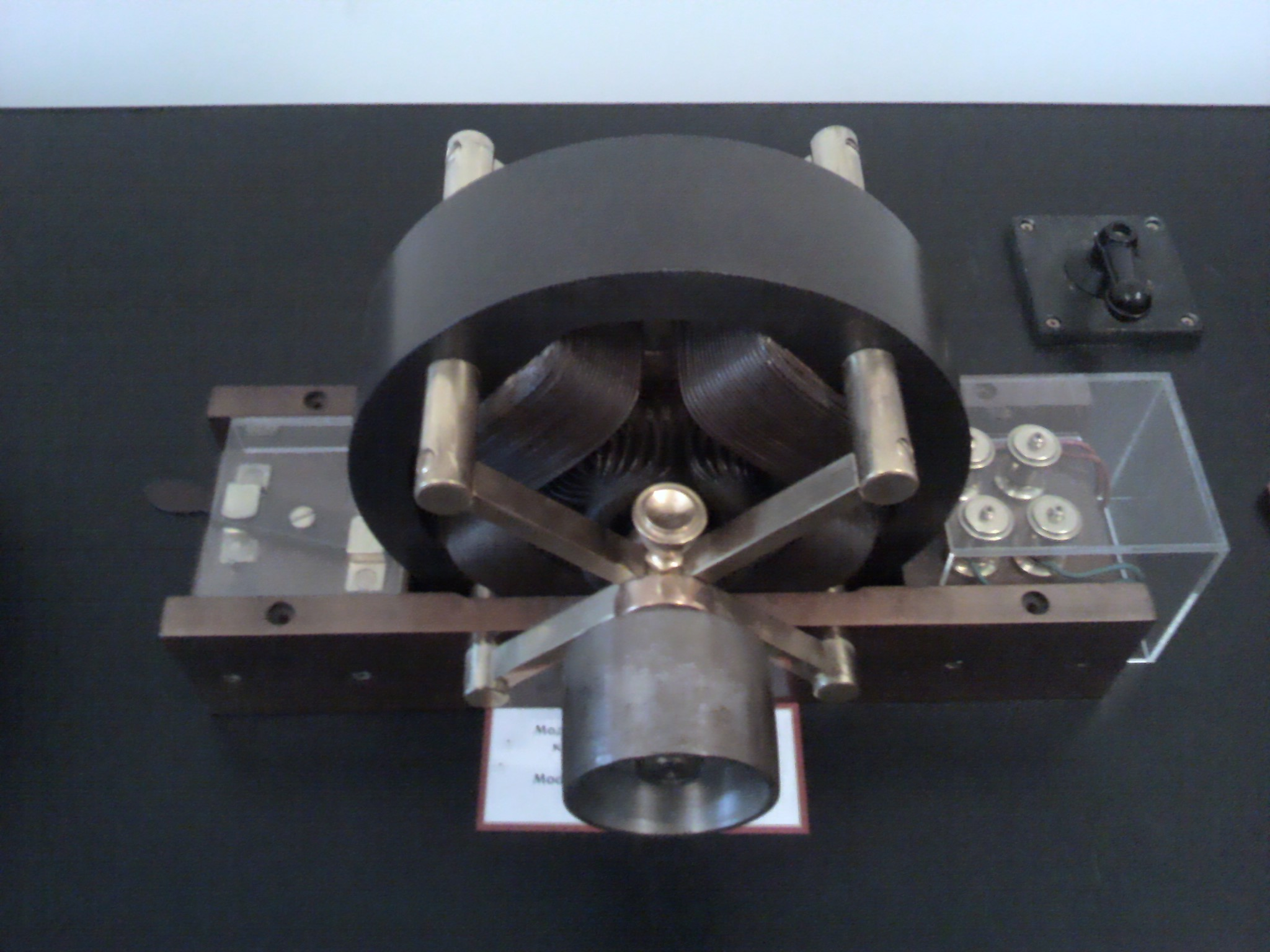
A copy of the two phase induction motor from 1887. The original Tesla induction motor from 1887 is in Imperial College London.

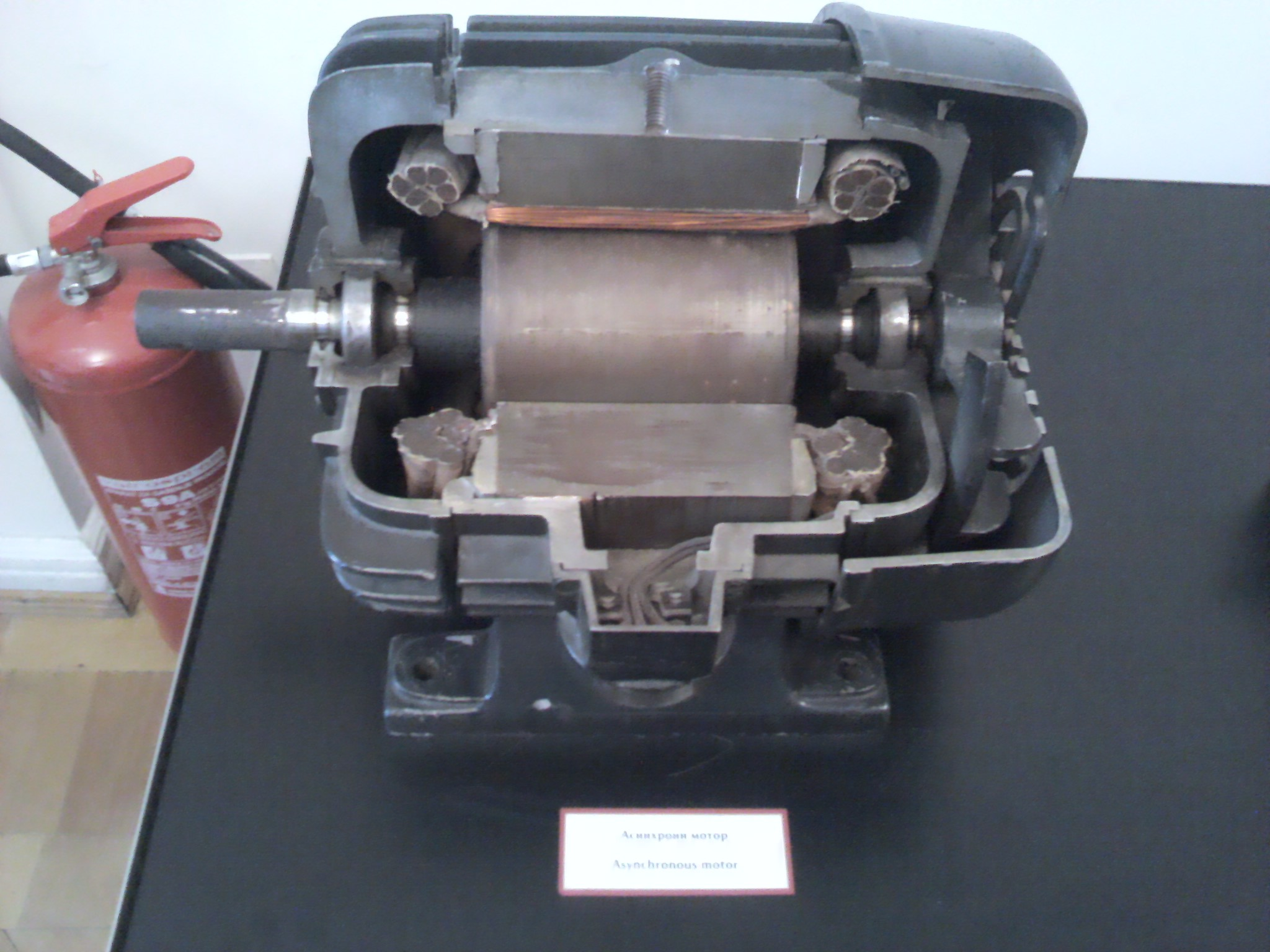
Cross-section of asynchronous motor built on Tesla's principles

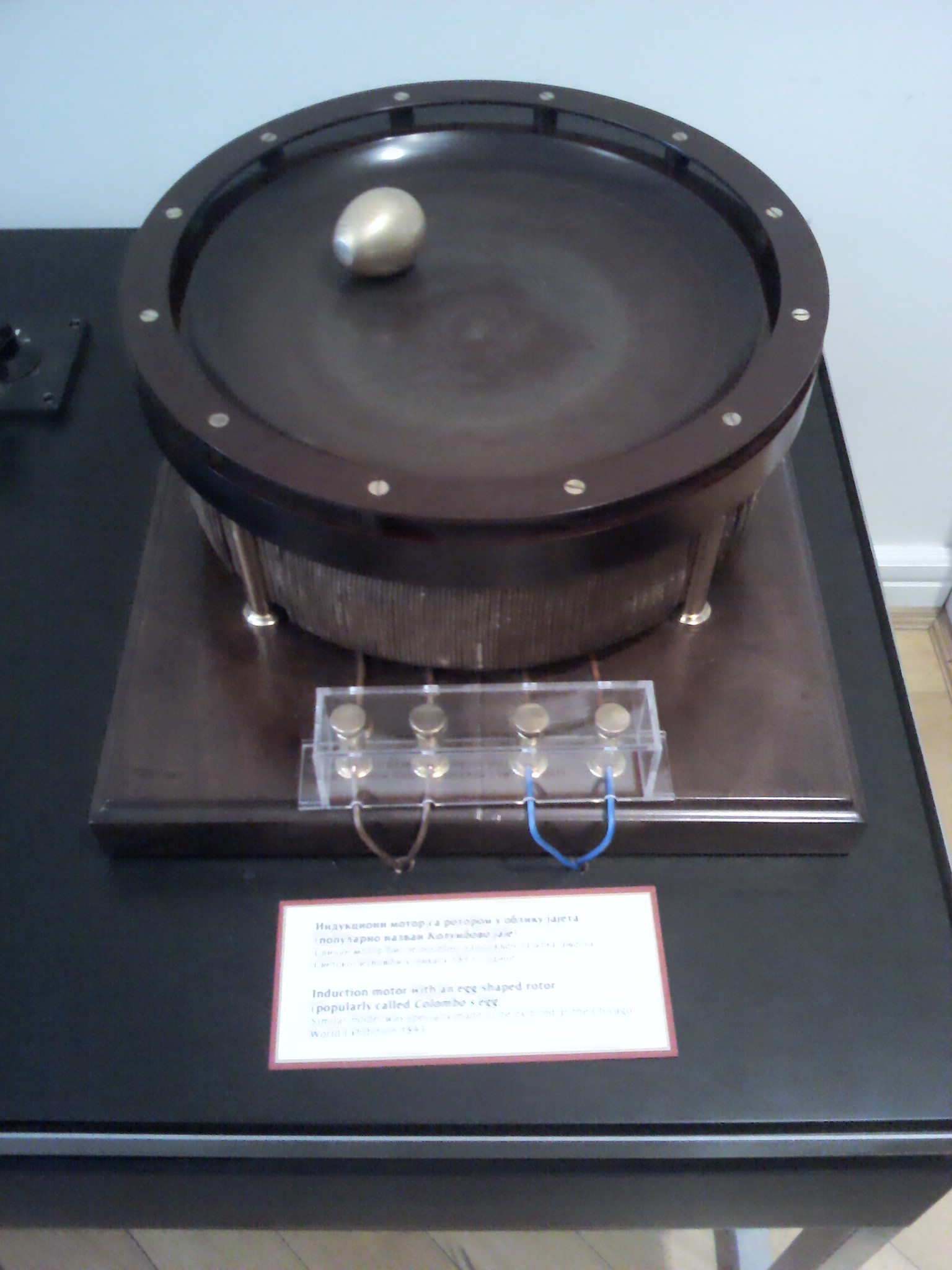
Induction motor with an egg shaped rotor, popularly called the Egg of Columbus. This is a copy of the original shown at the World's Columbian Exposition in 1893

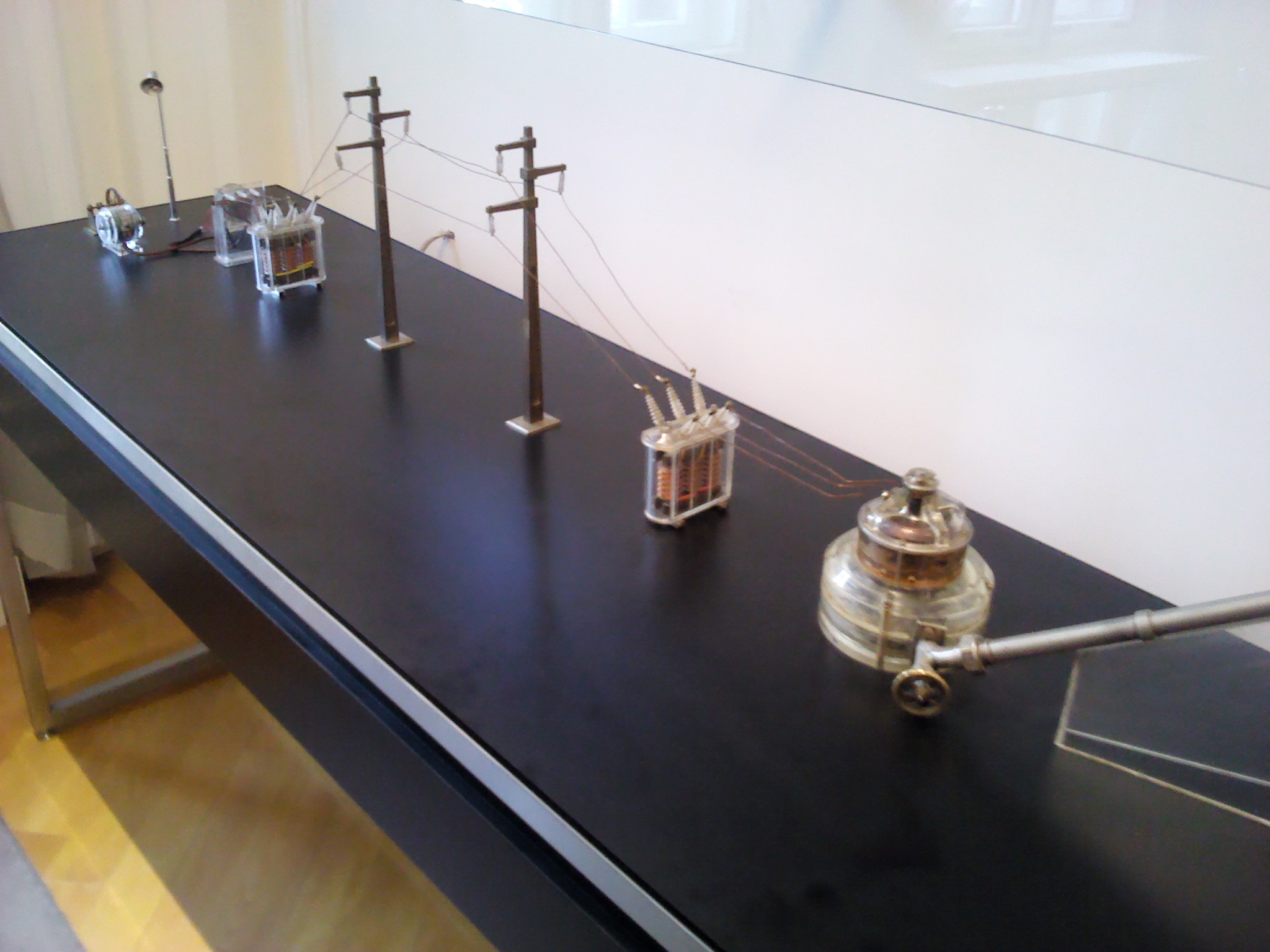
Polyphase system. Showing an example of generation, transmission and utilization of electrical energy.

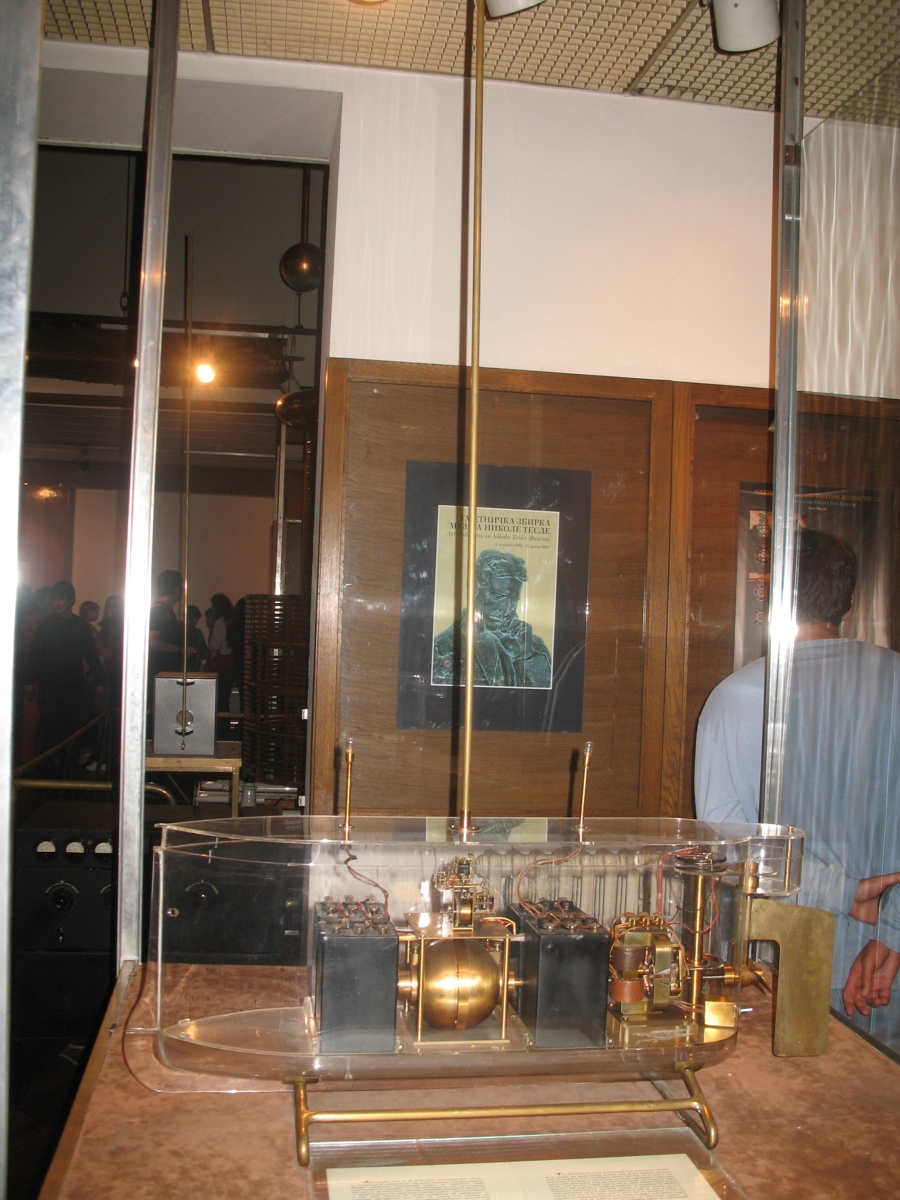
Model of a boat operated by remote control

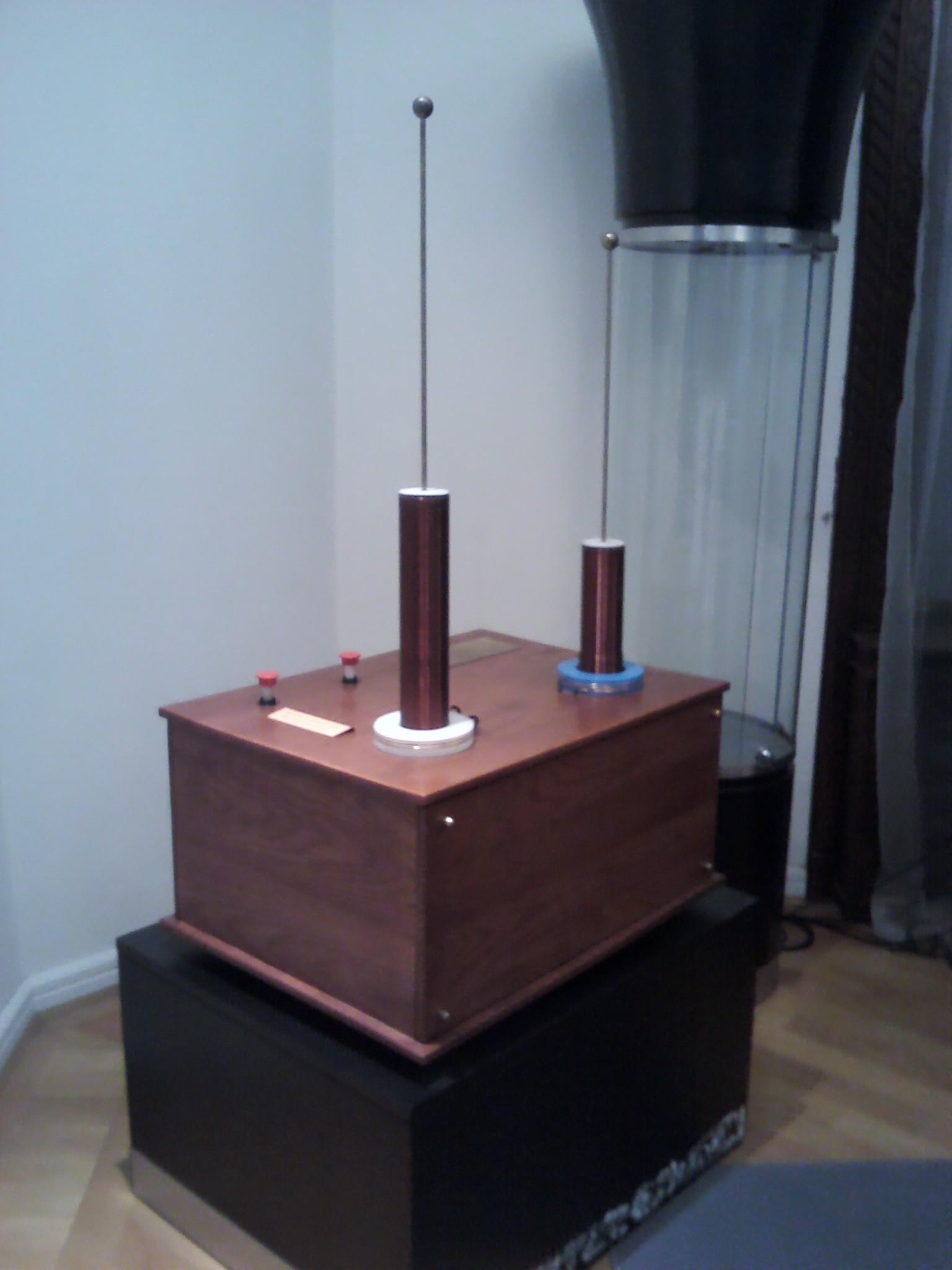
Telecommand unit for model boat

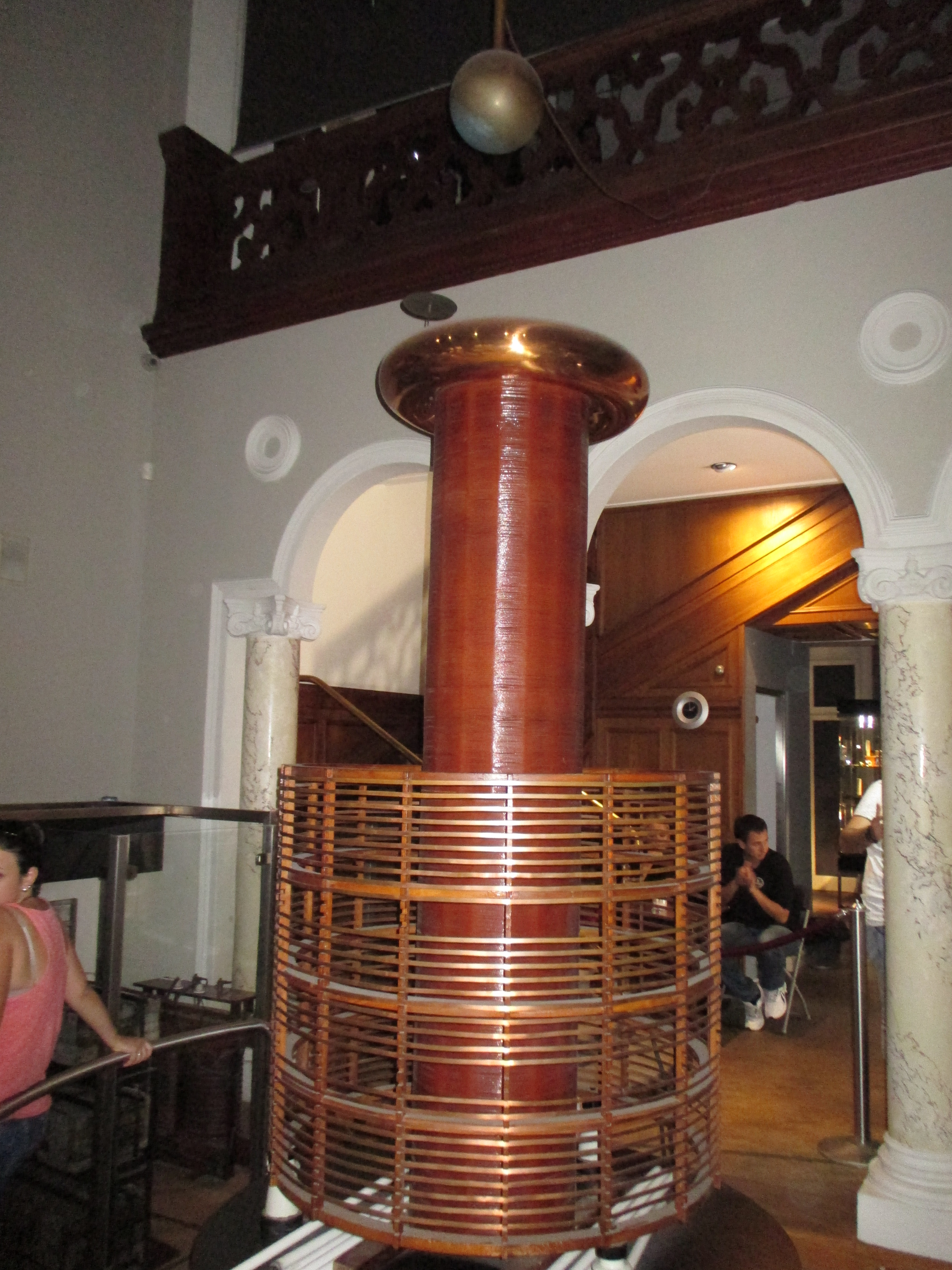
Tesla coil

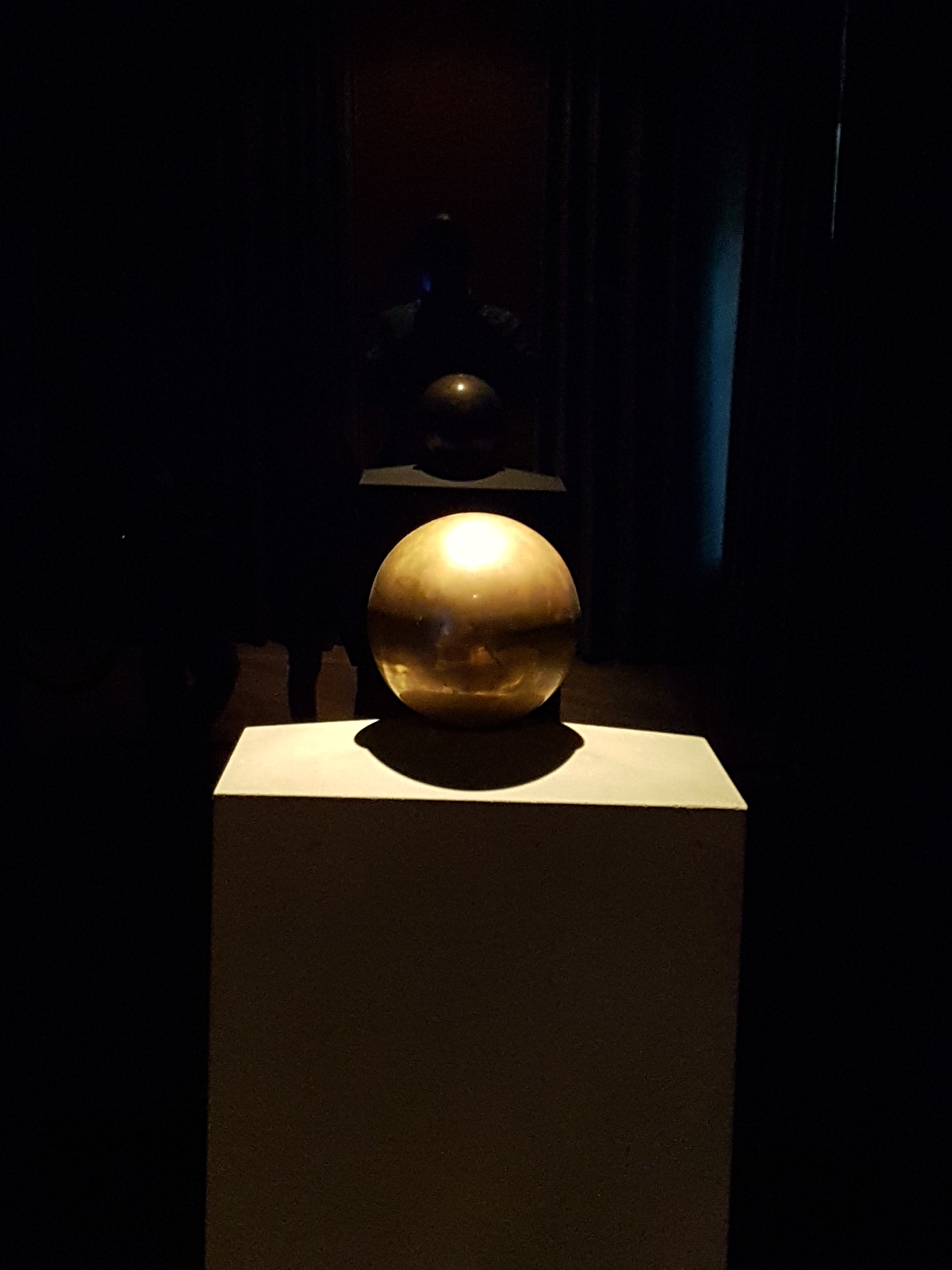
Tesla's urn

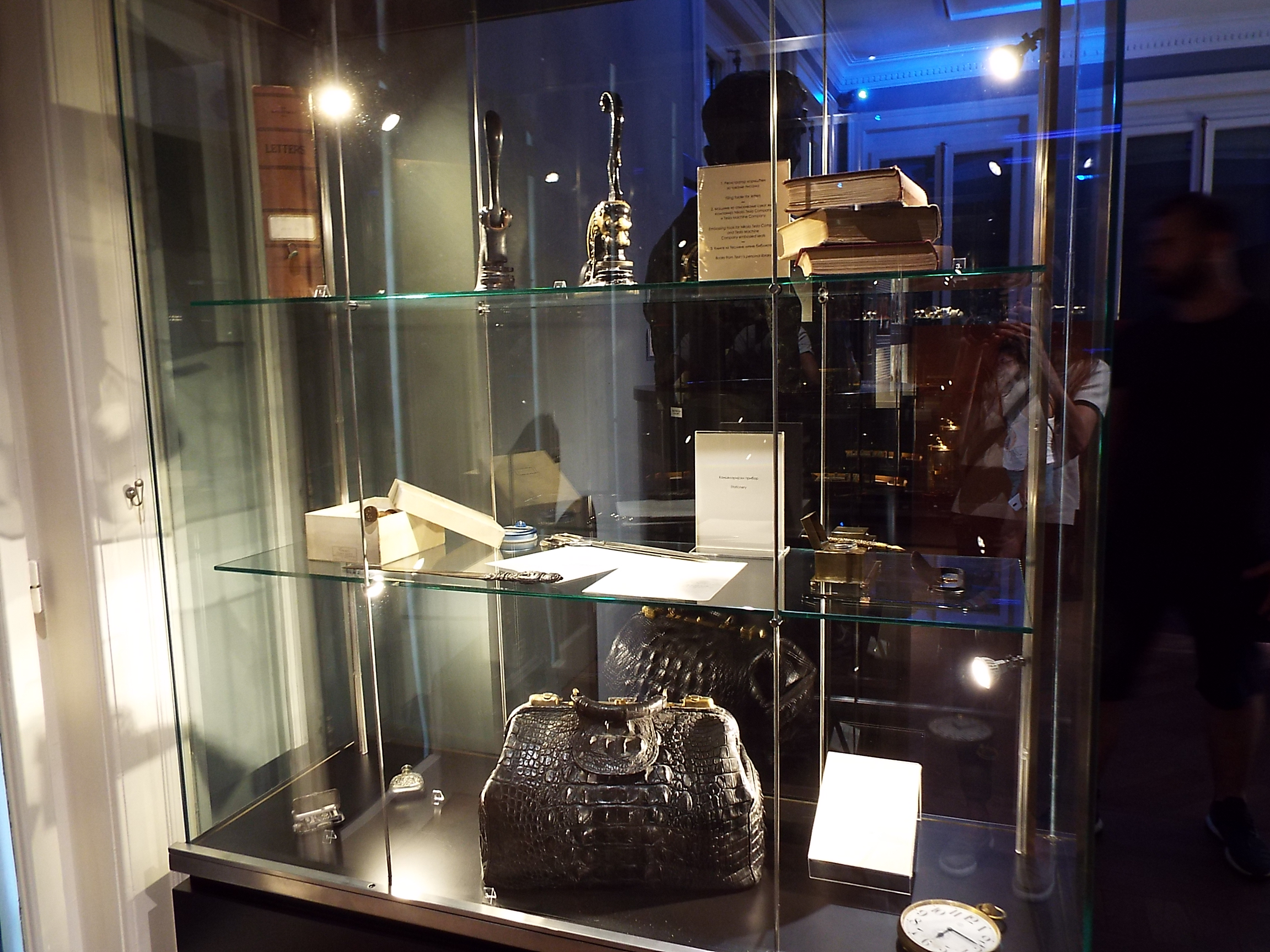
Personal items

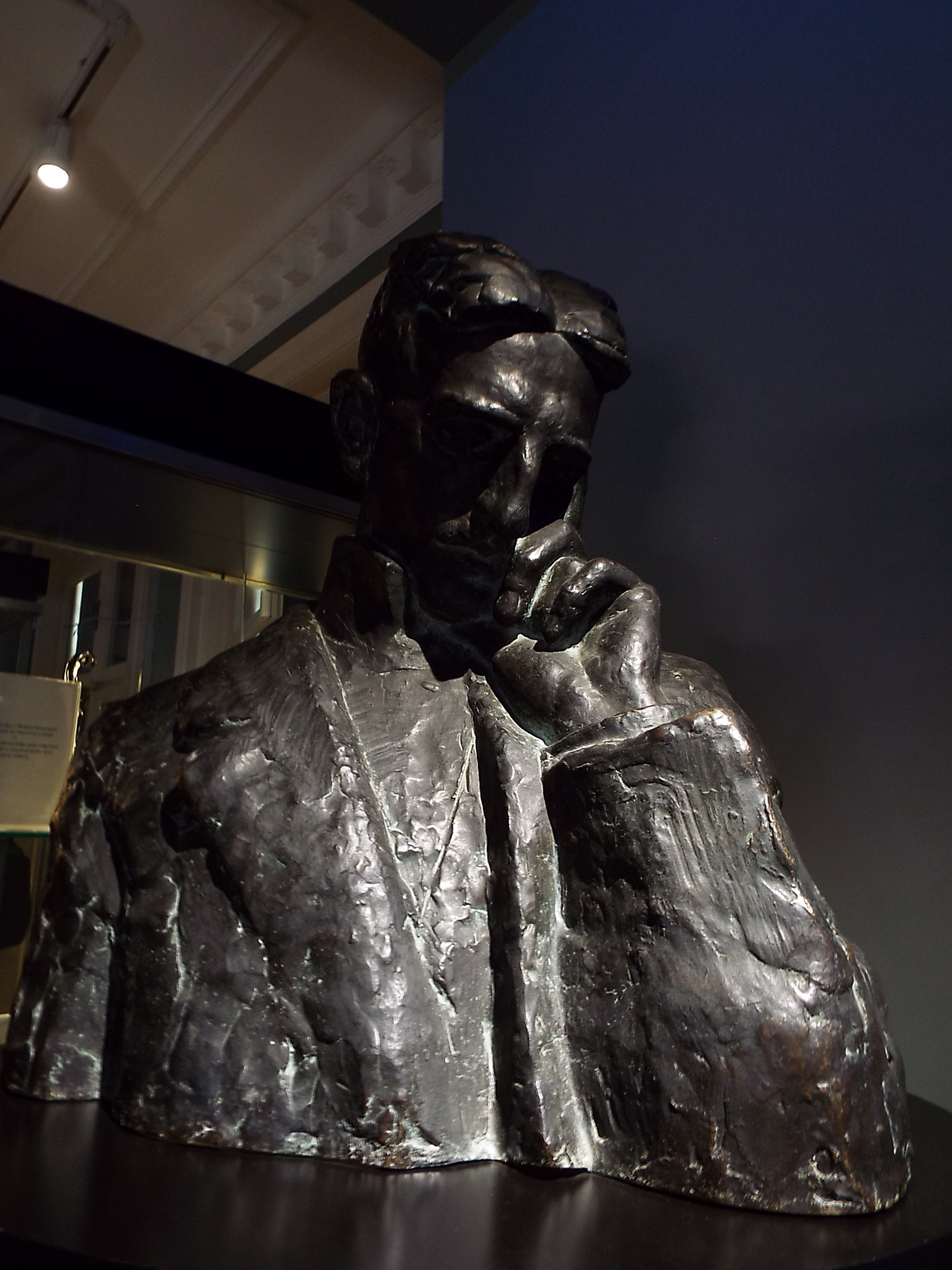
Bust of Tesla

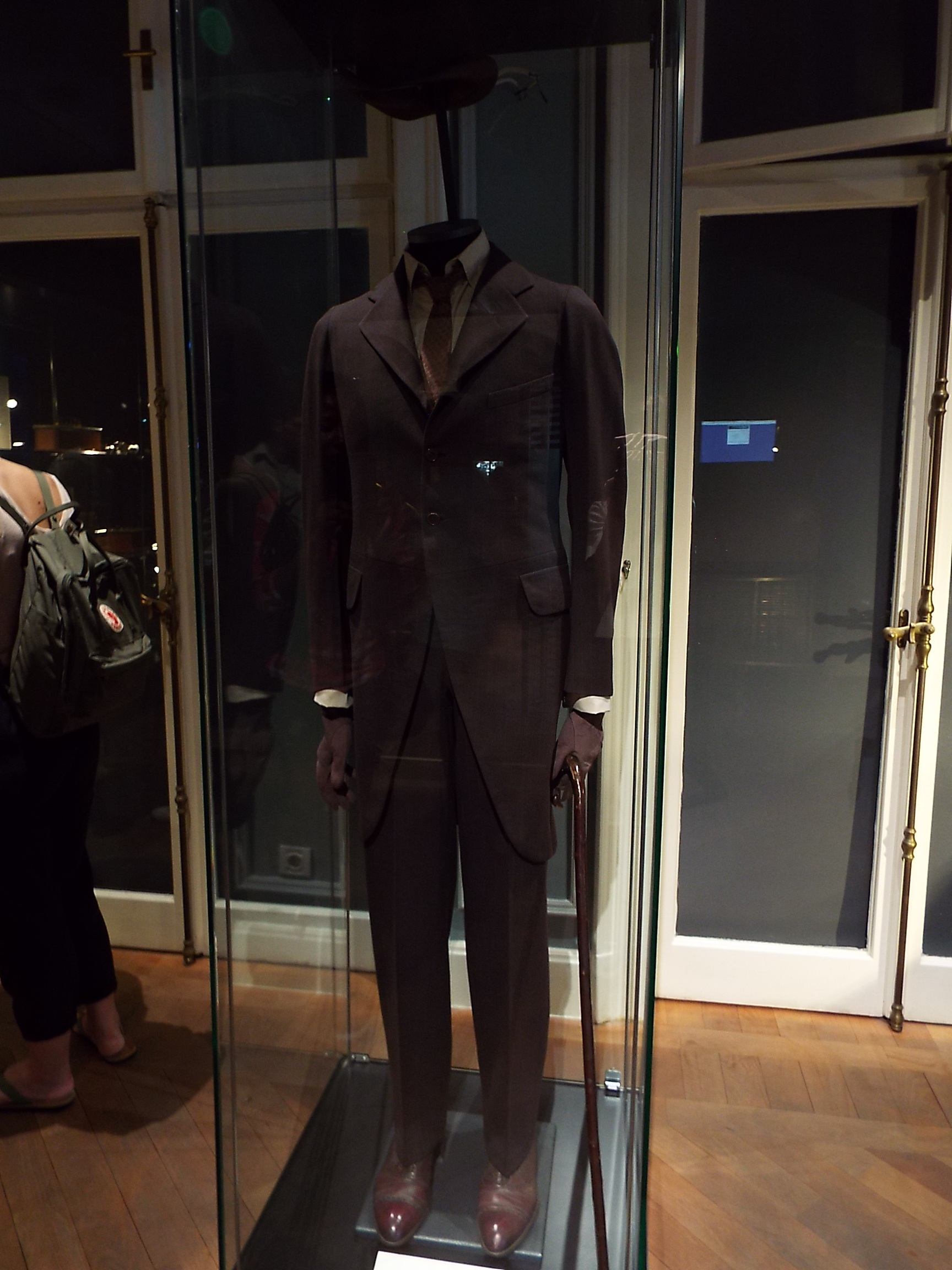
Tesla's suit

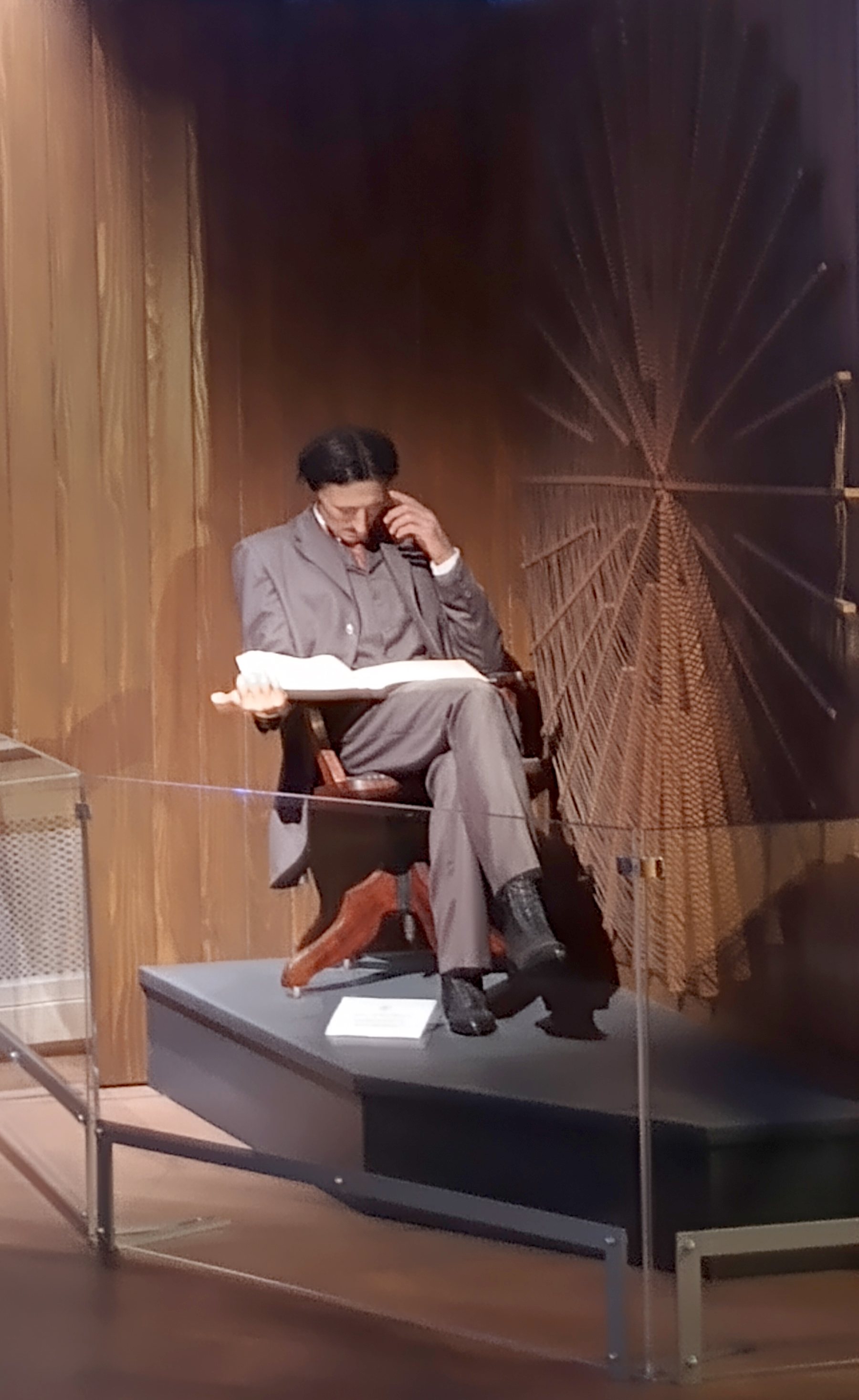
Wax figure of Nikola Tesla in the Museum

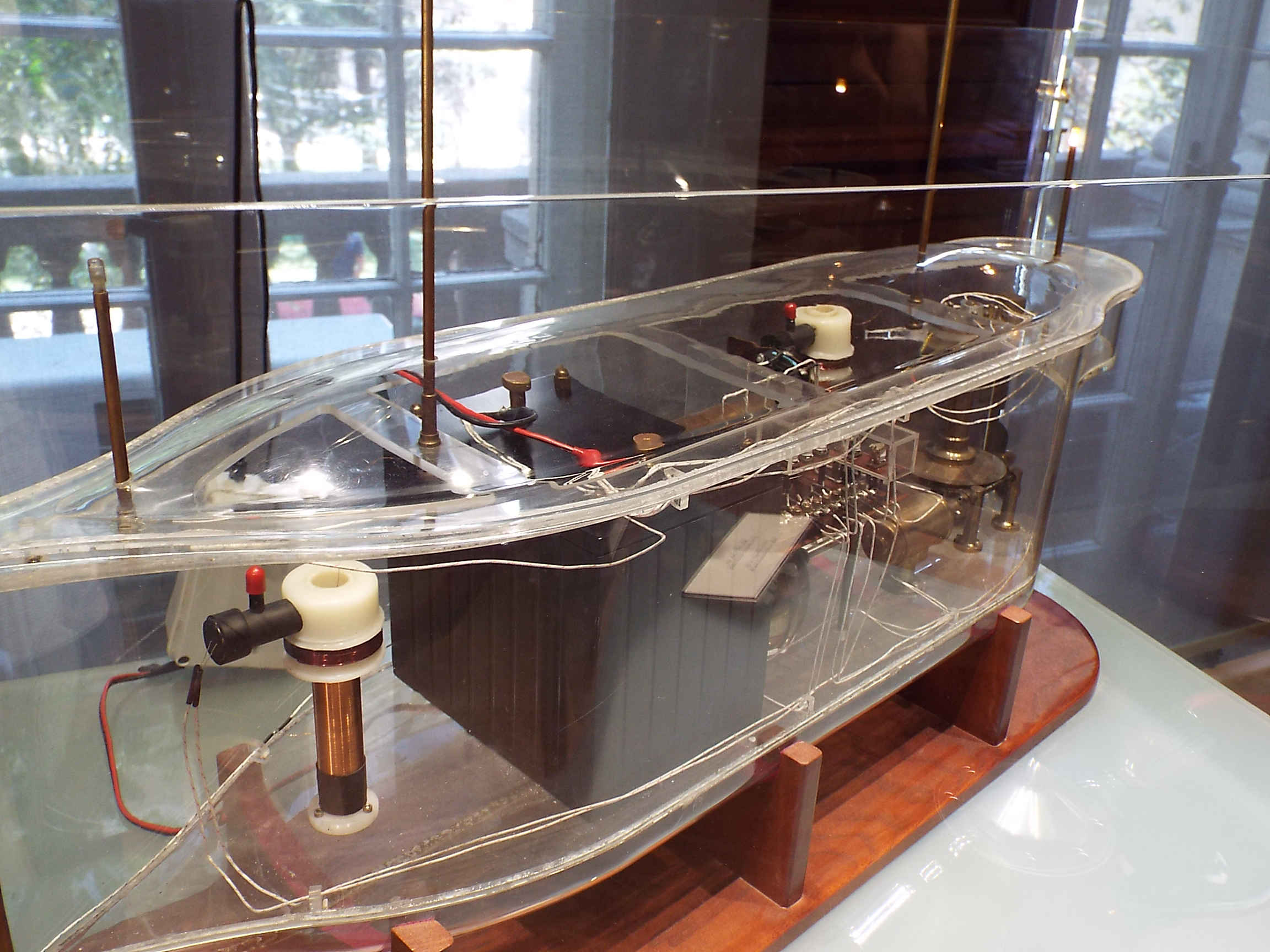
Demonstrations of Tesla's inventions during a guided tour at the Museum

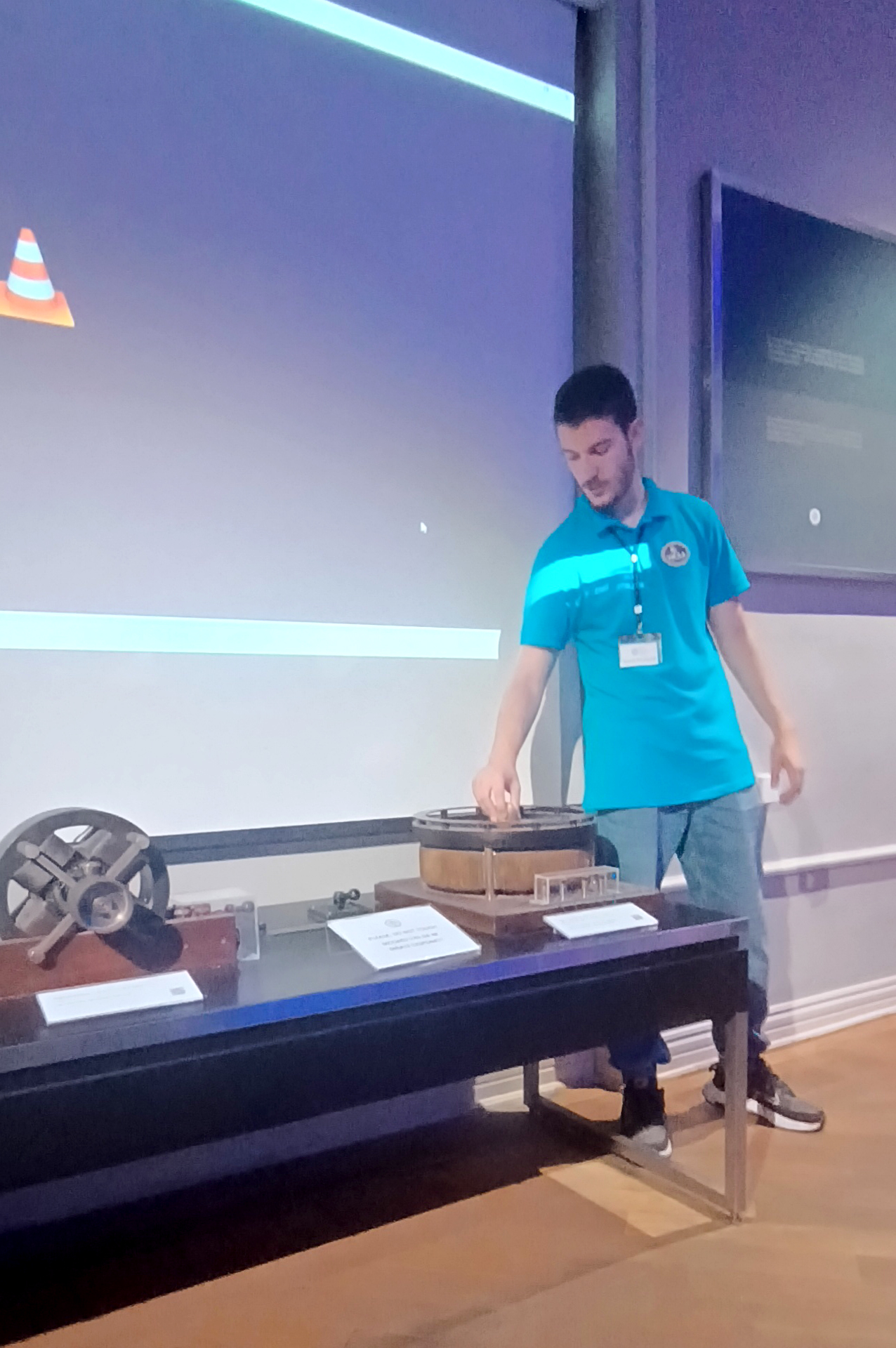

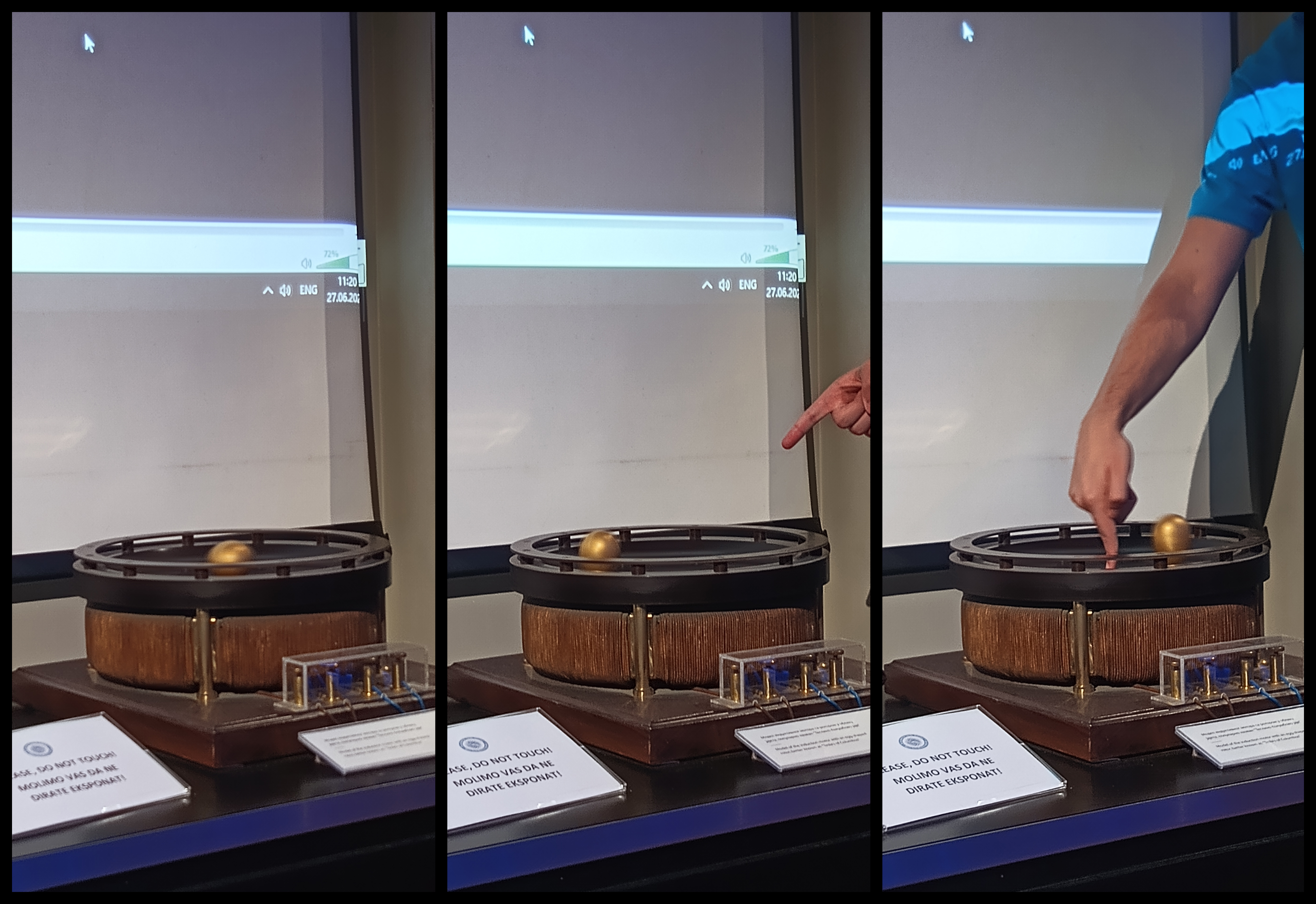

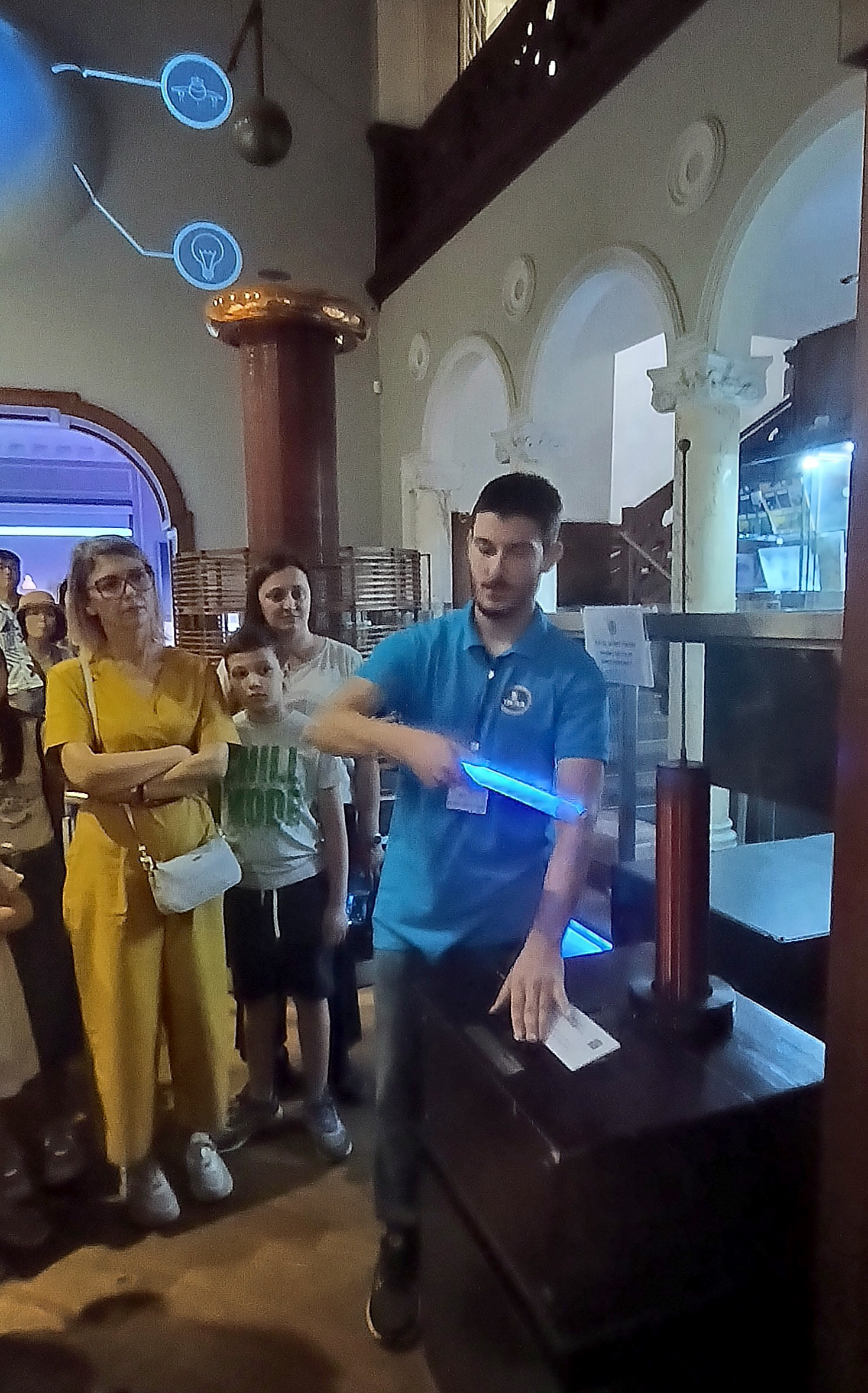

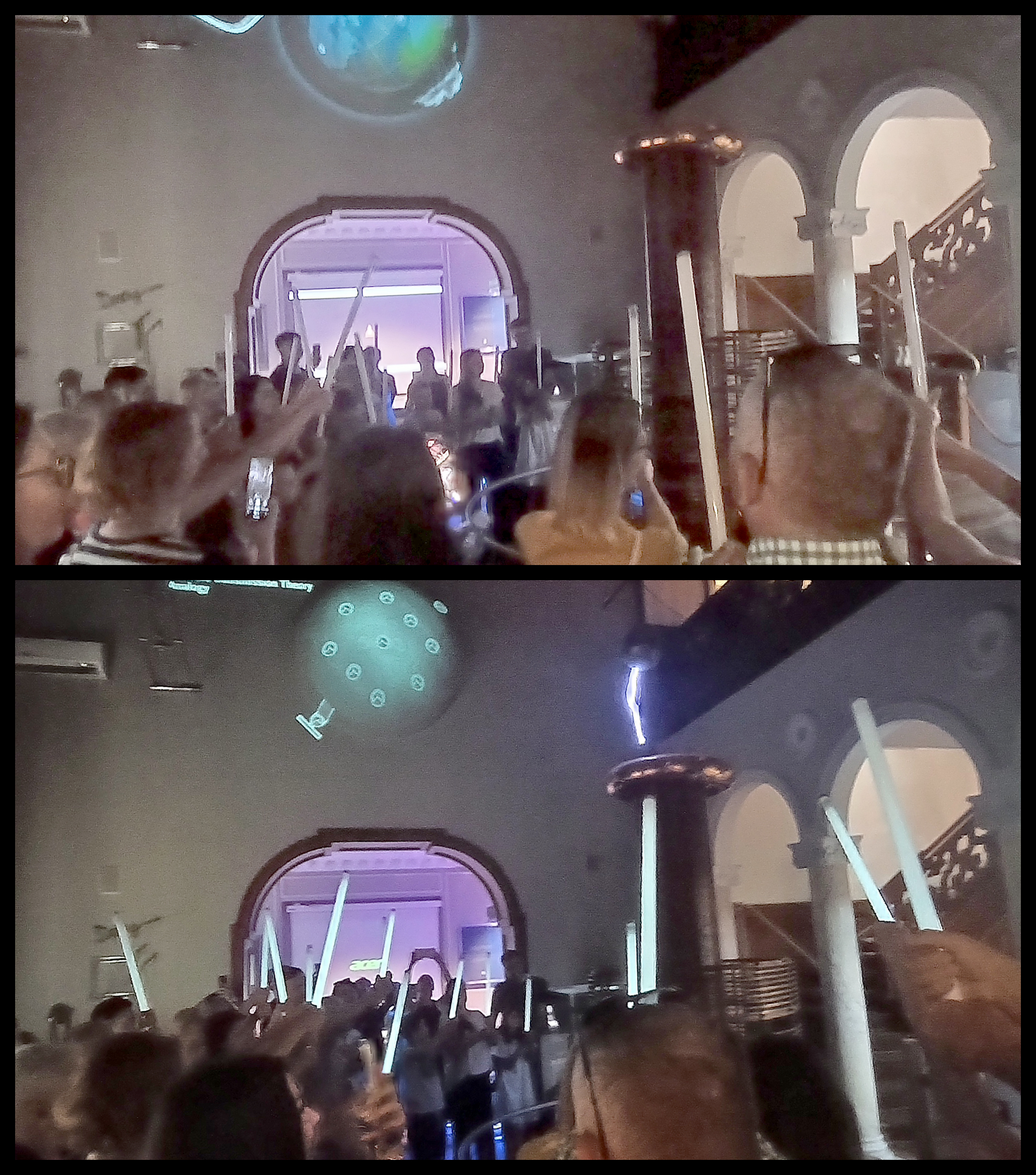

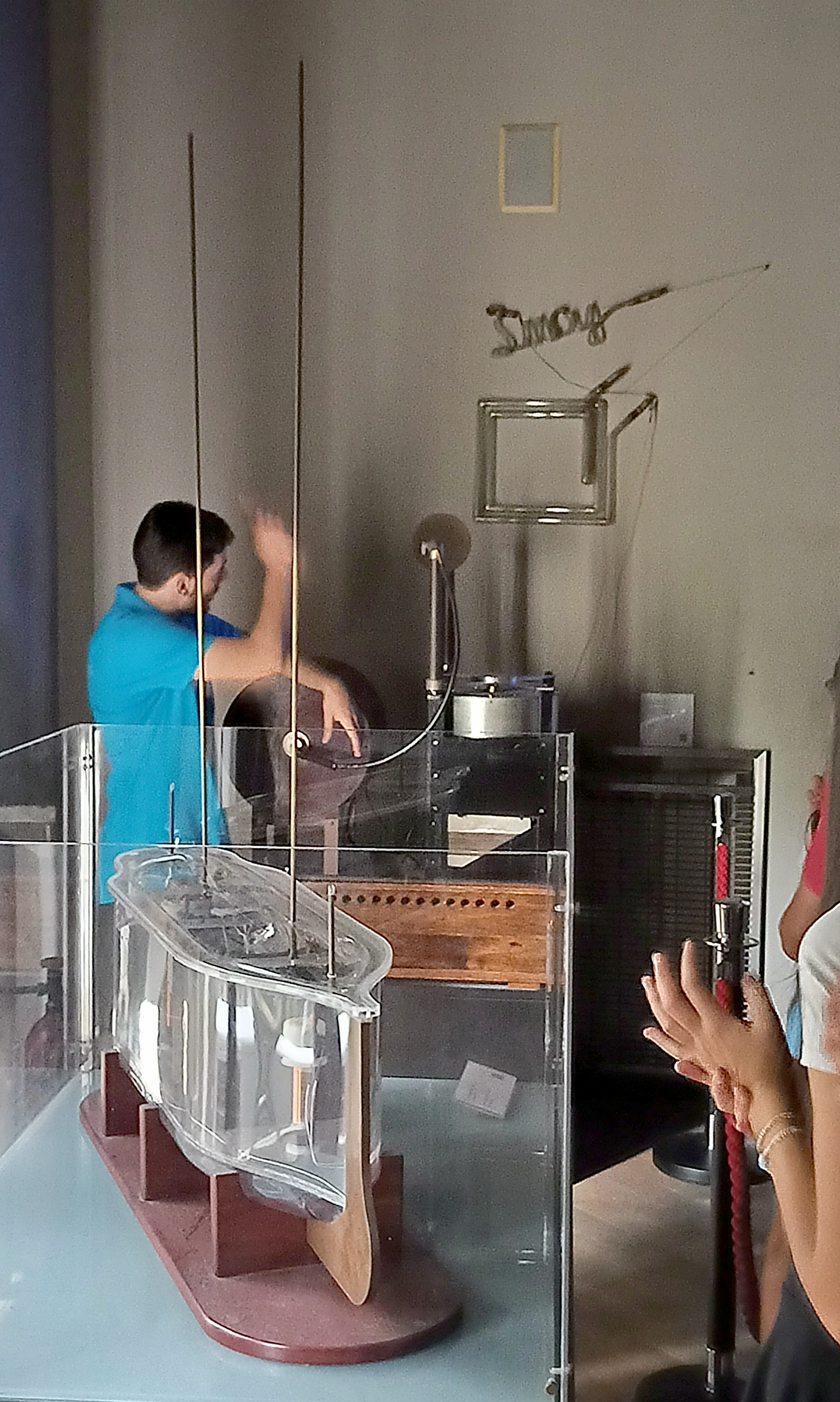

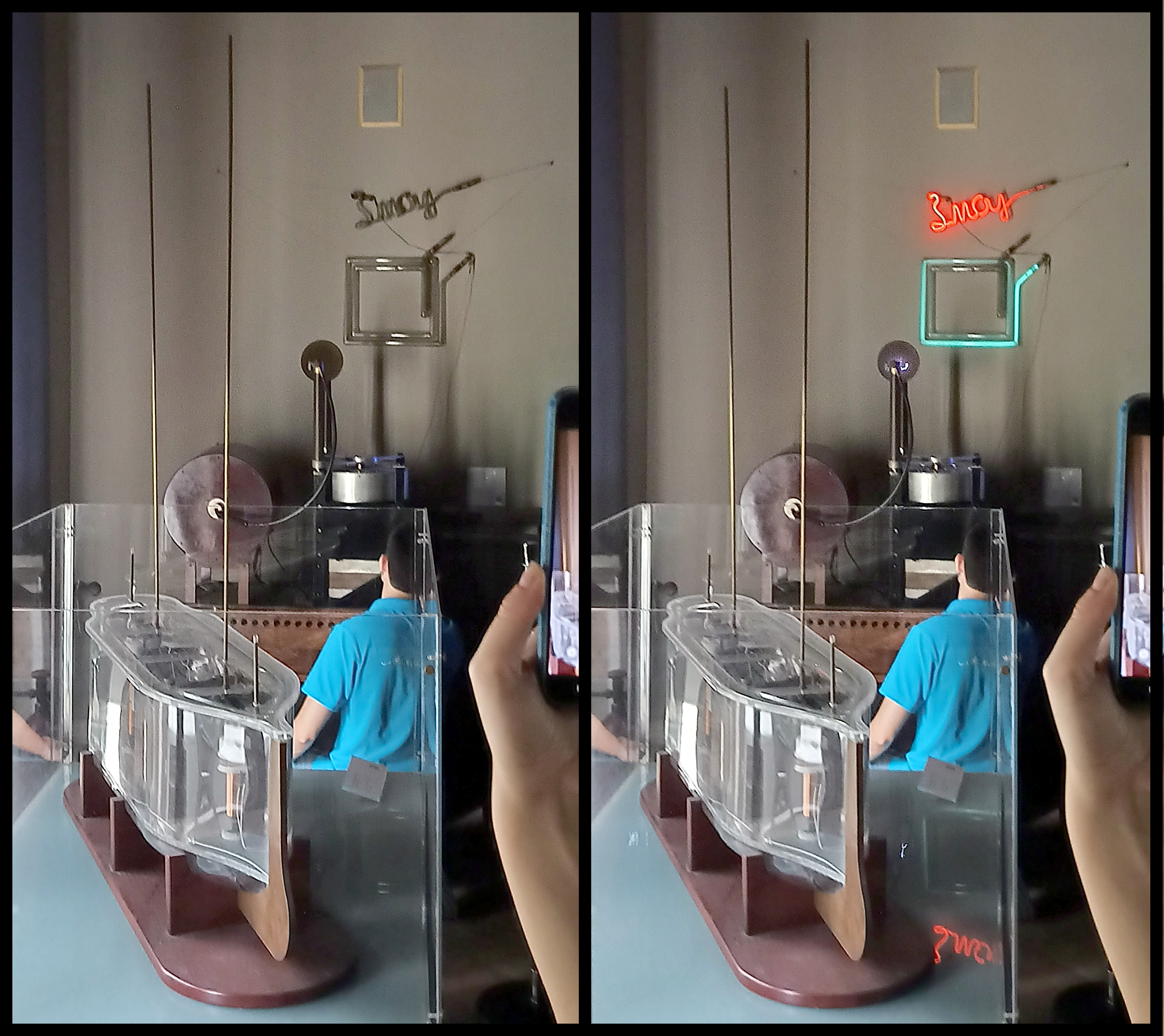

== See also ==
- Nikola Tesla Memorial Center, museum in Smiljan, Croatia
- Nikola Tesla
- Wardenclyffe tower
- Wireless energy transmission
- Tesla Science Center at Wardenclyffe
- Genčić Family House
- List of museums in Serbia
