= Dragiša Brašovan =

Serbian architect (1887–1965)

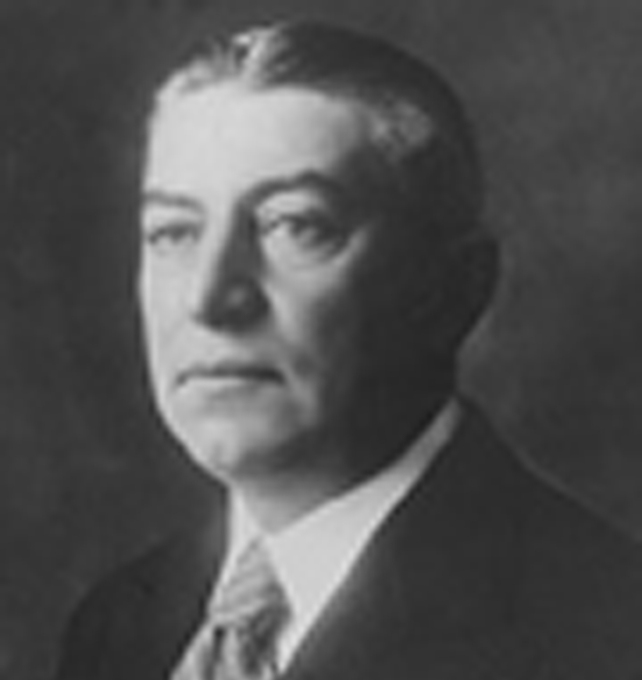
- Born: May 25, 1887; Vršac, Austro-Hungarian Empire
- Died: October 6, 1965 (aged 78); Belgrade, SFR Yugoslavia
- Occupation: Architect

Dragiša Brašovan (Serbian Cyrillic: Драгиша Брашован; May 25, 1887 – October 6, 1965) was a Serbian modernist architect, one of the leading architects of the early 20th century in Yugoslavia.

== Works ==
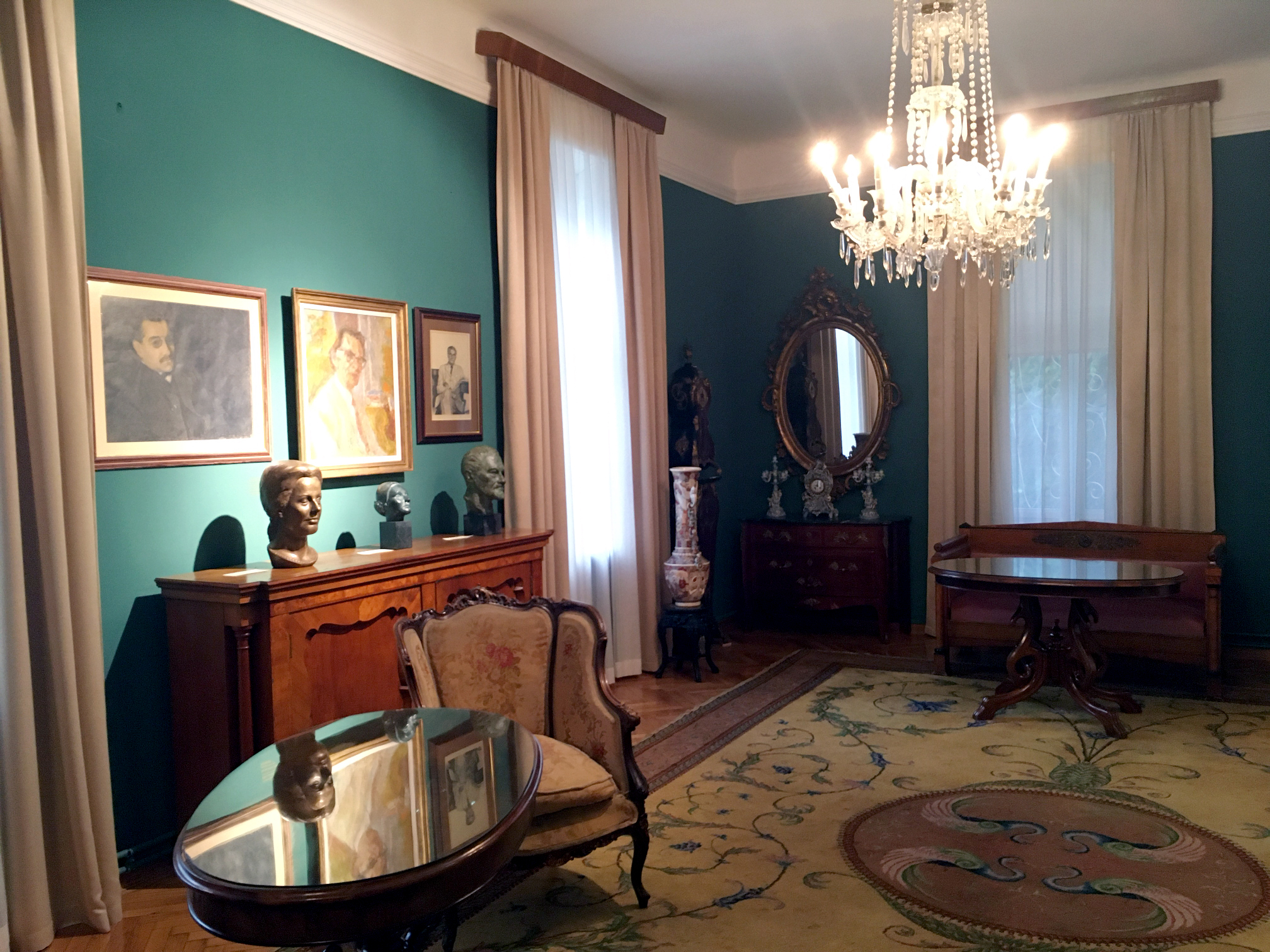
Brašovan's personal items, Gallery of Matica Srpska

Barcelona

- Serbian, Croatian and Slovene Pavilion for the 1929 Barcelona International Exposition. Was with the Barcelona Pavilion of Mies van der Rohe and the Swedish Pavilion of Peder Clason the only examples of avant-garde architecture. The building, demolished after the exposition, had the shape of an irregular star and the façade had no ornamental elements as the other historicist pavilions.

Belgrade:

- The Museum of Nikola Tesla building, 1932.
- The State Printing building (later BIGZ building), 1934-1941.
- Command of the Air Force Zemun, 1939.
- Hotel Metropol, 1953.
- Several buildings built in the 1930s (Francuska no. 5, Liberation Blvd. No.2, Boulevard of Despot Stefan no. 8, etc.).

Jagodina:

- Apartment blocks of Cable Factory Svetozarevo (FX), built in the late 1950s

Novi Sad:

- Workers' Association, 1931.
- Banovina Palace, (now the Executive Council of Vojvodina), 1939.
- Main Post Office, 1961.

Orlovat:

- Church of the Presentation of Mary, 1924-1927.

Zrenjanin:

- Serbian bank building, about 1920th
- Sokolski dom, 1927.
- Begej Vila, 1926.

Čortanovci:

- Stanković Vila, 1930.

Čačak:

- "Partizan" departement store, 1963

== Gallery ==
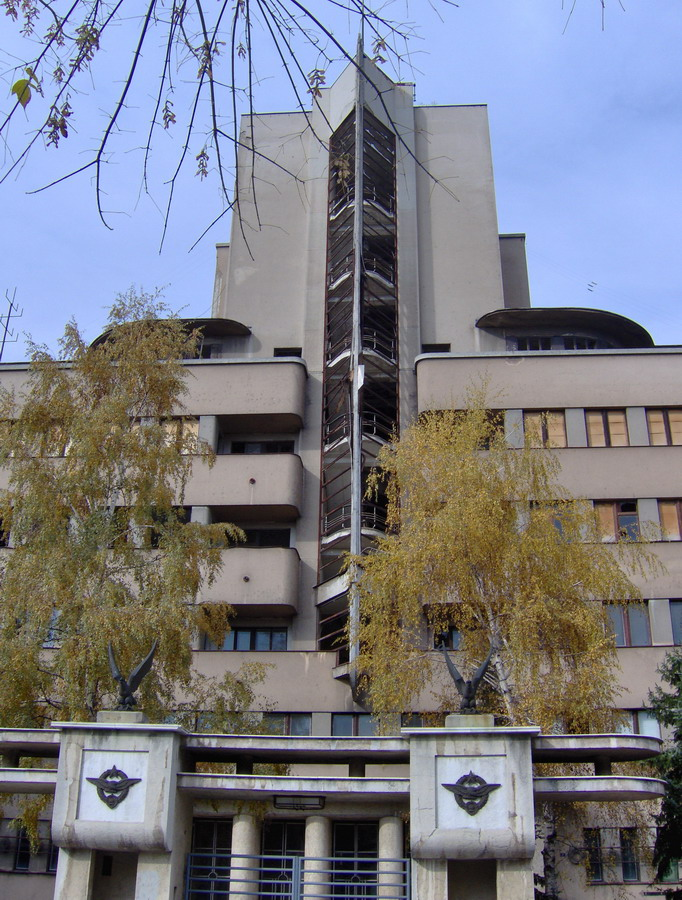
Air Force Command in Zemun.

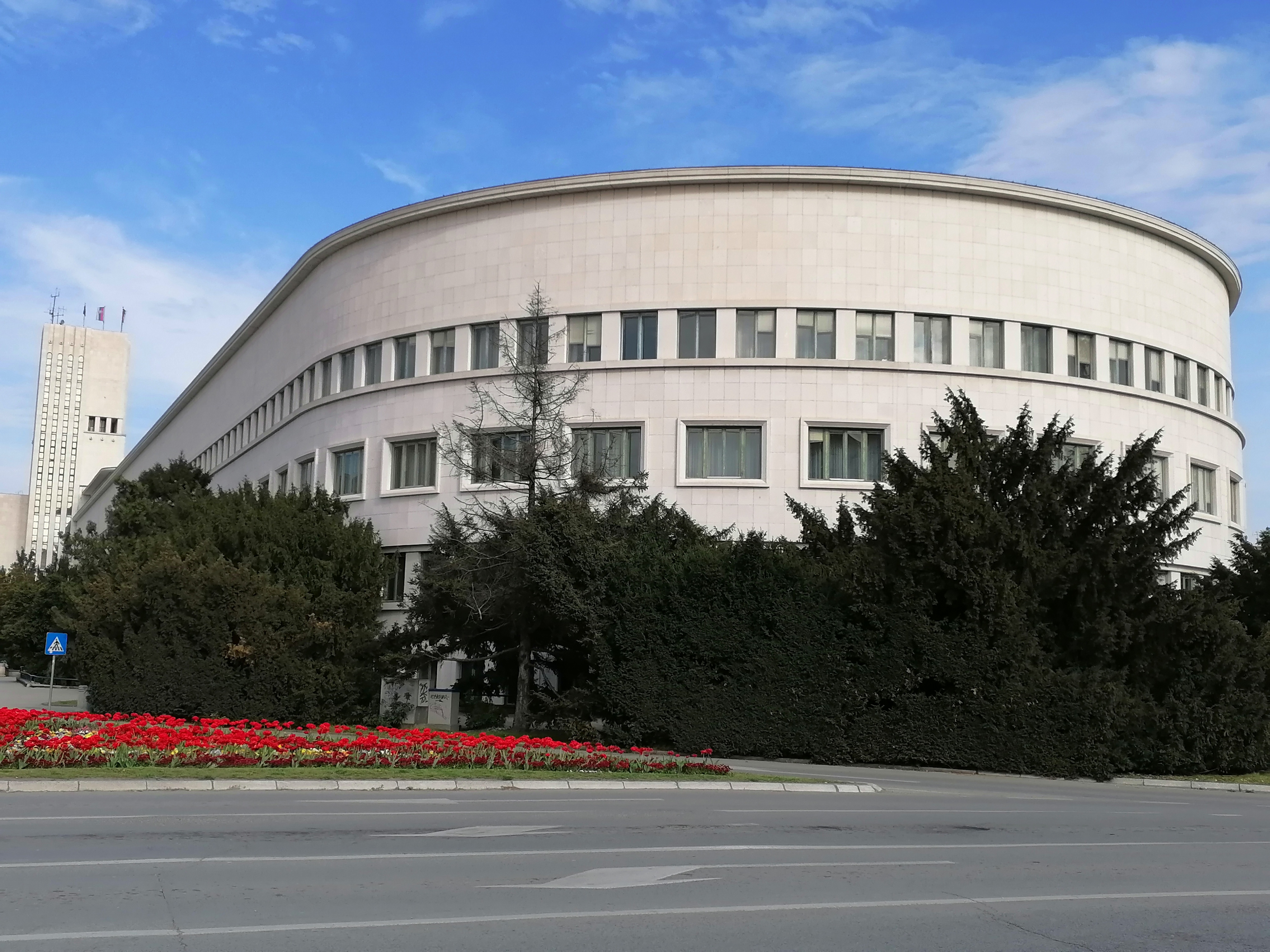
Banovina Palace in Novi Sad

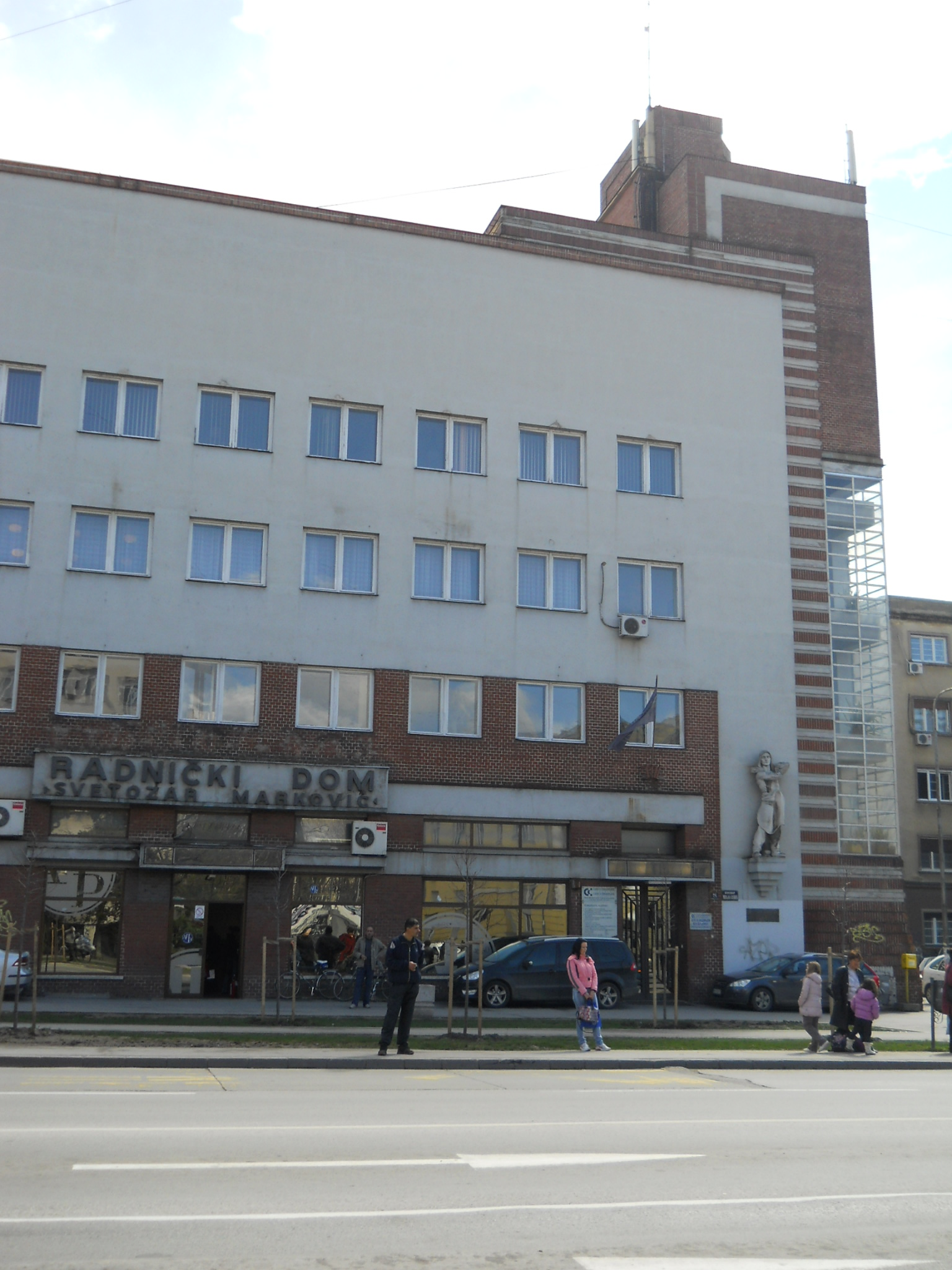
Workers' Association in Novi Sad

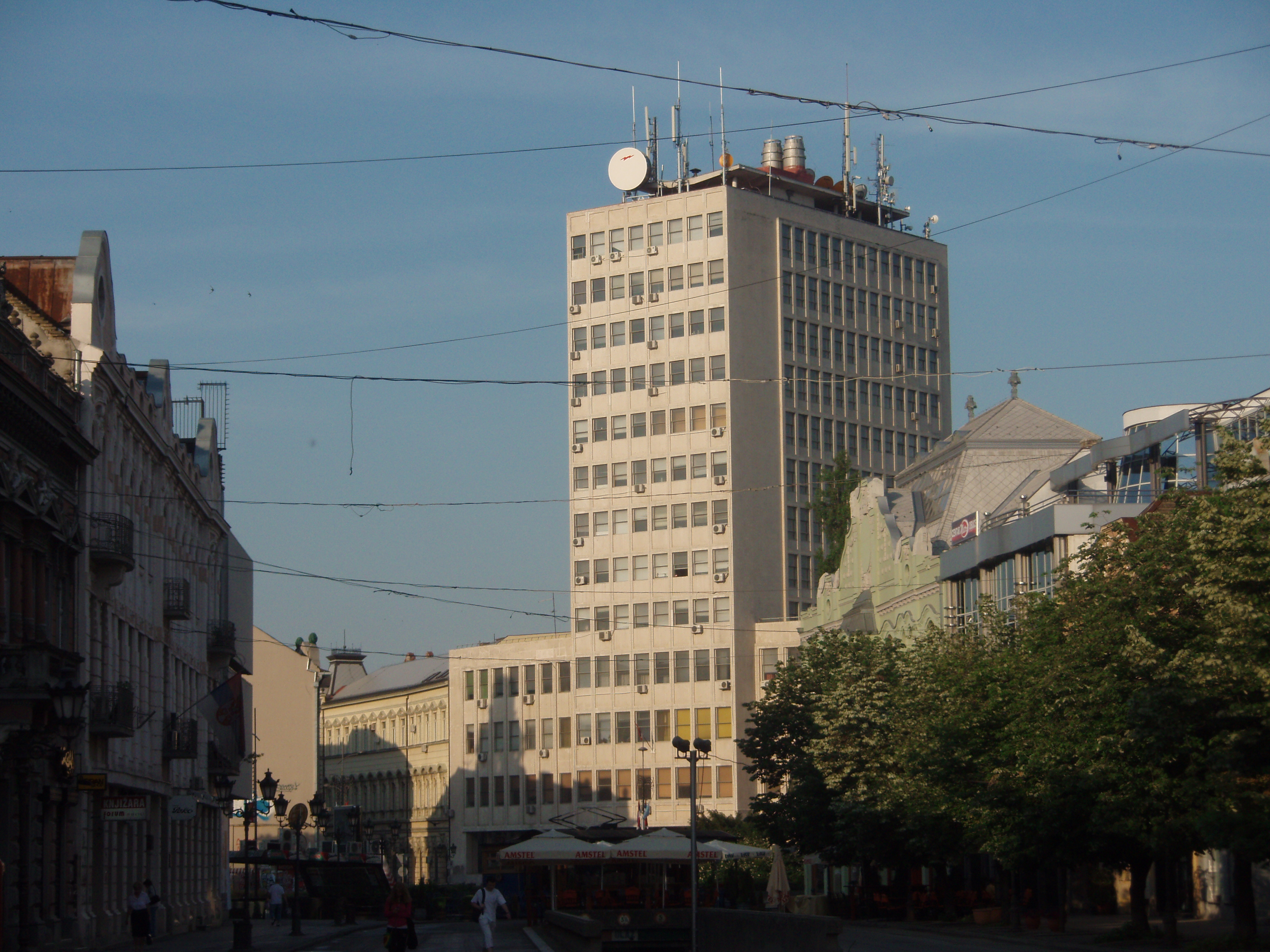
Main Postal Office in Novi Sad

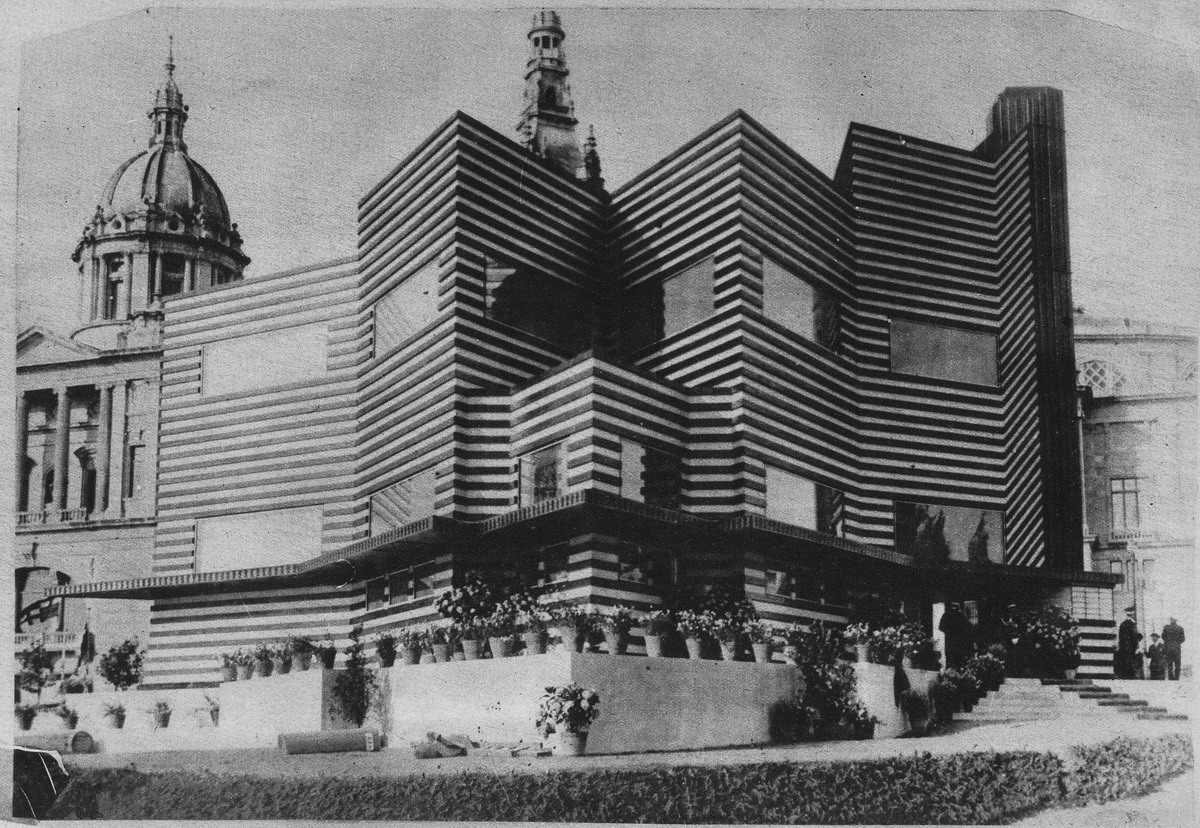
Serbian, Croatian and Slovene Pavilion, Barcelona 1929

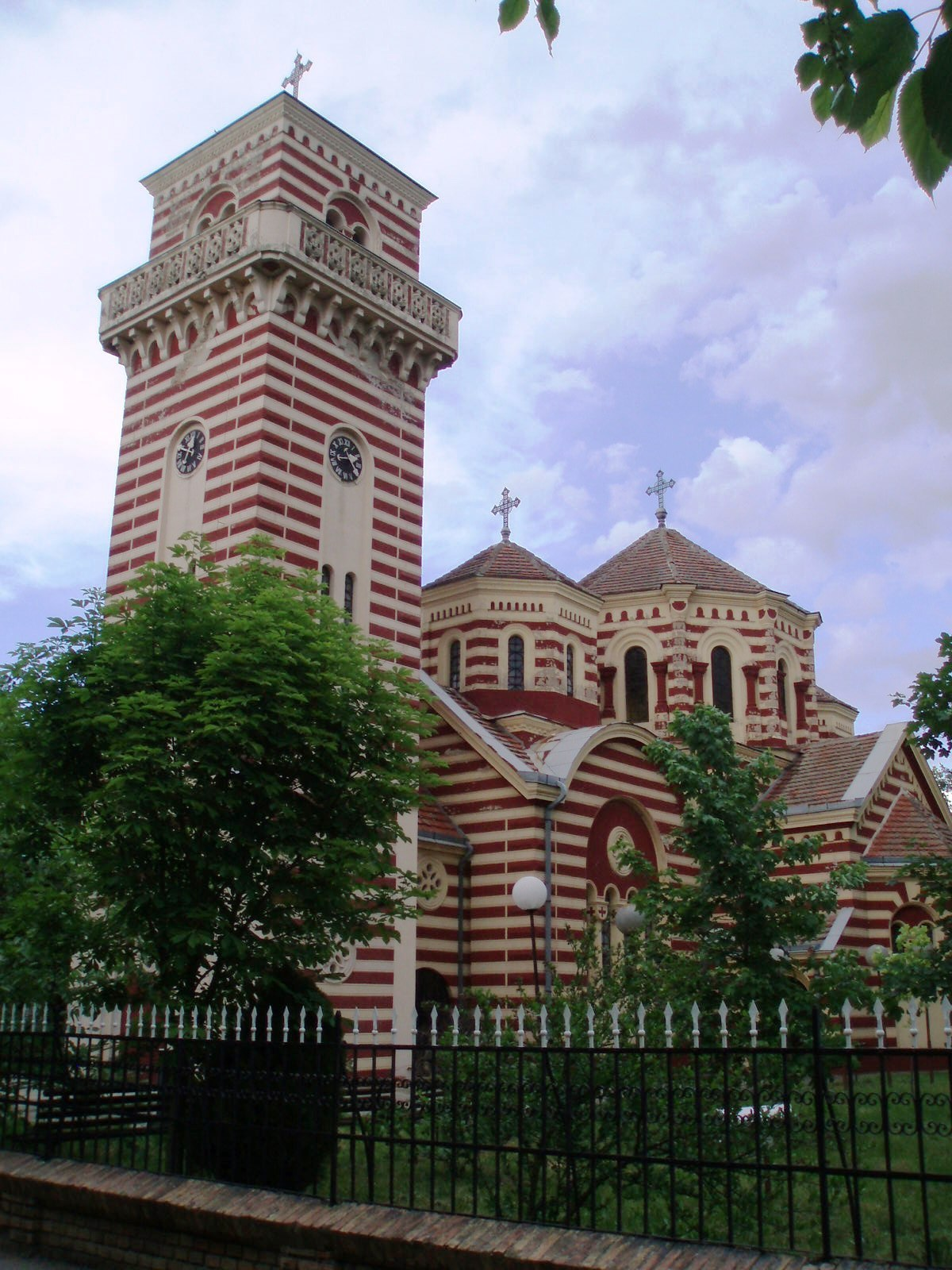
Church in Orlovat

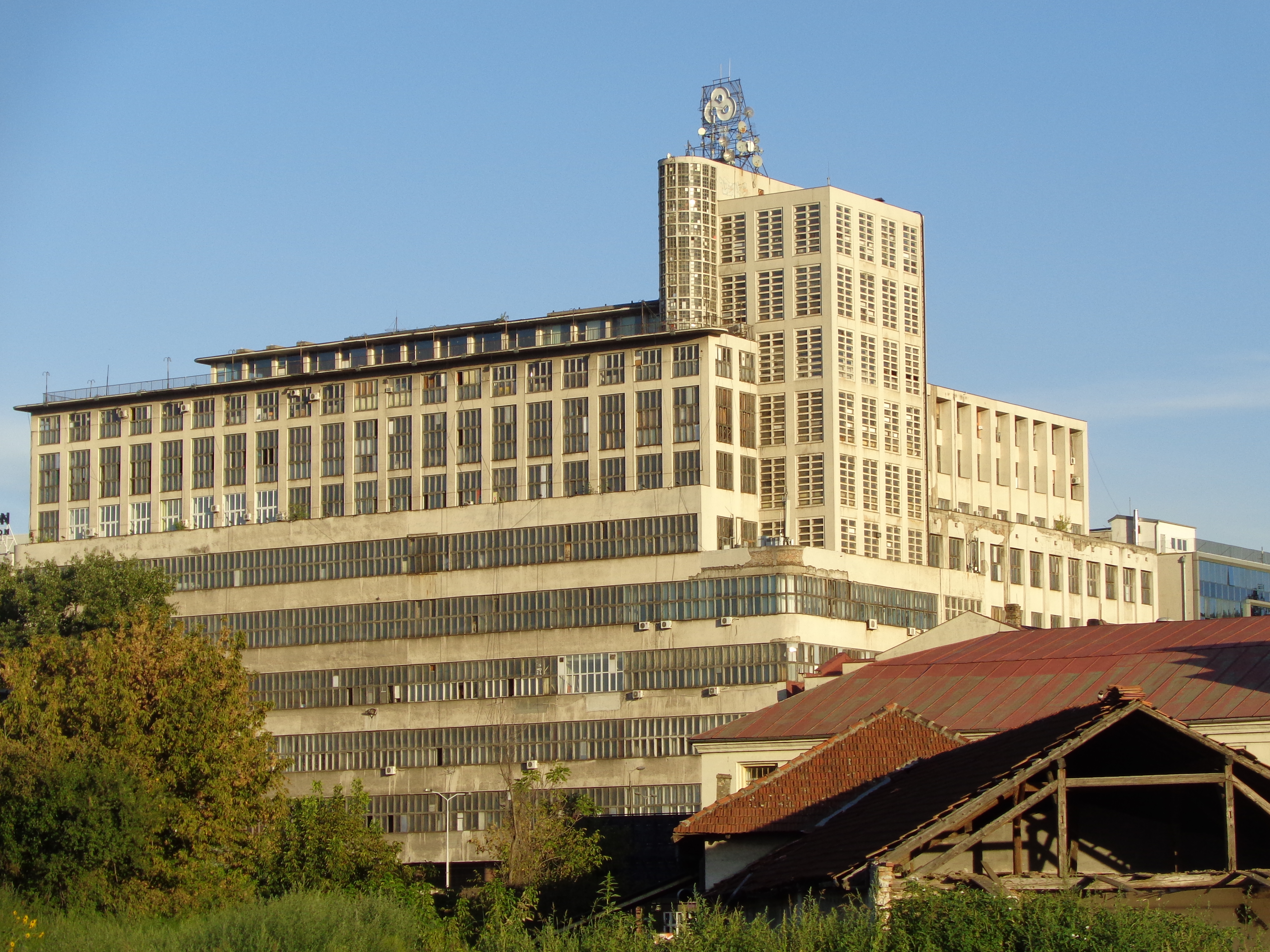
BIGZ building in Belgrade

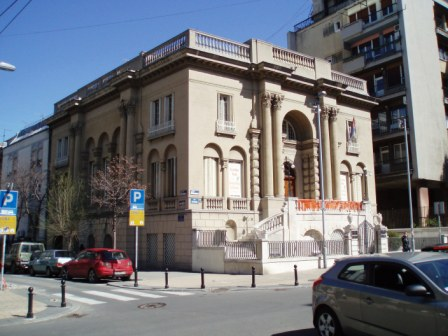
Nikola Tesla Museum in Belgrade

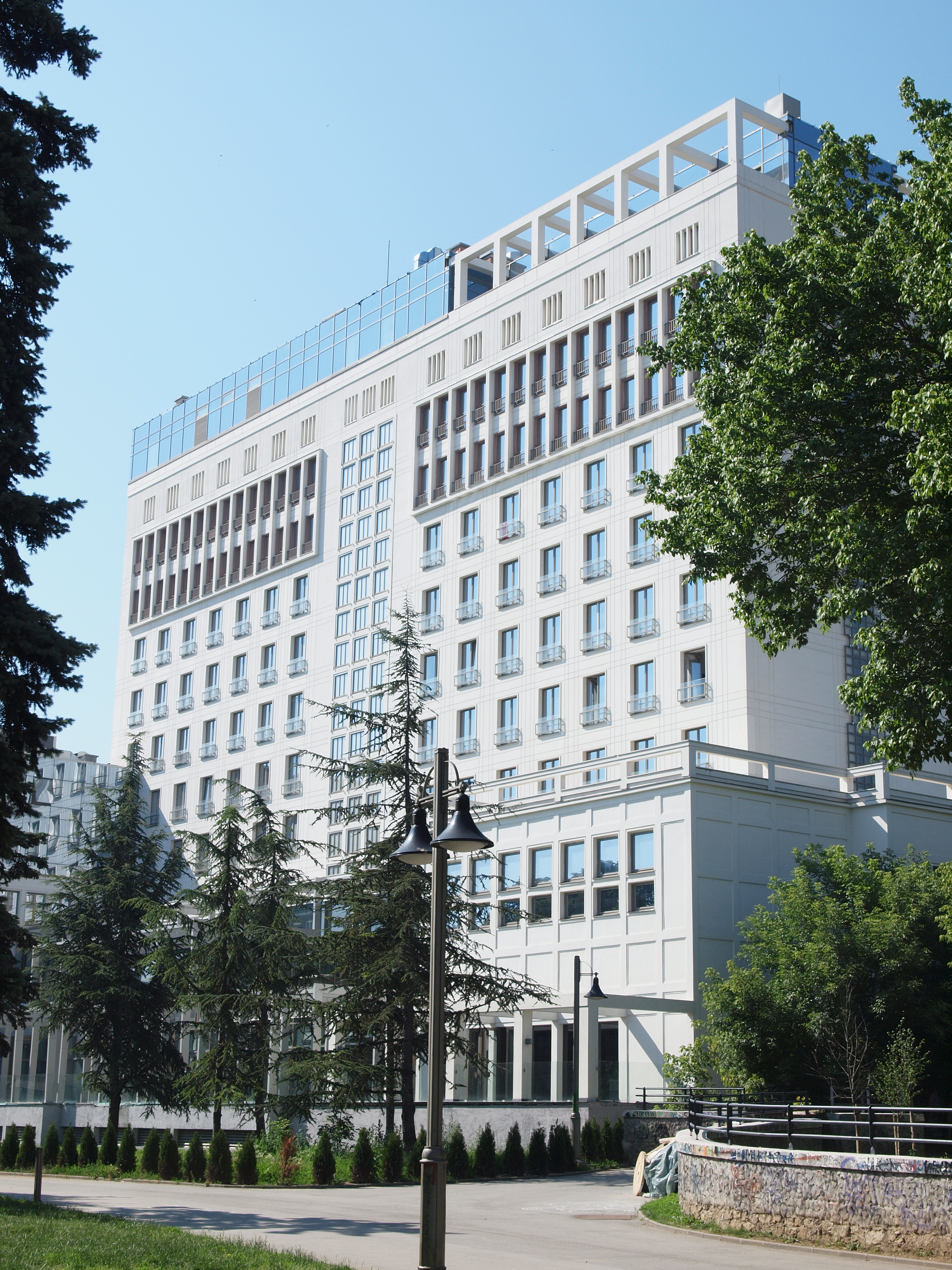
Metropol Palace Hotel Belgrade

== See also ==
- List of Serbian painters
- Momir Korunović
- Milan Antonović
- Dragutin Dragiša Milutinović
