= Cannabis in Serbia =

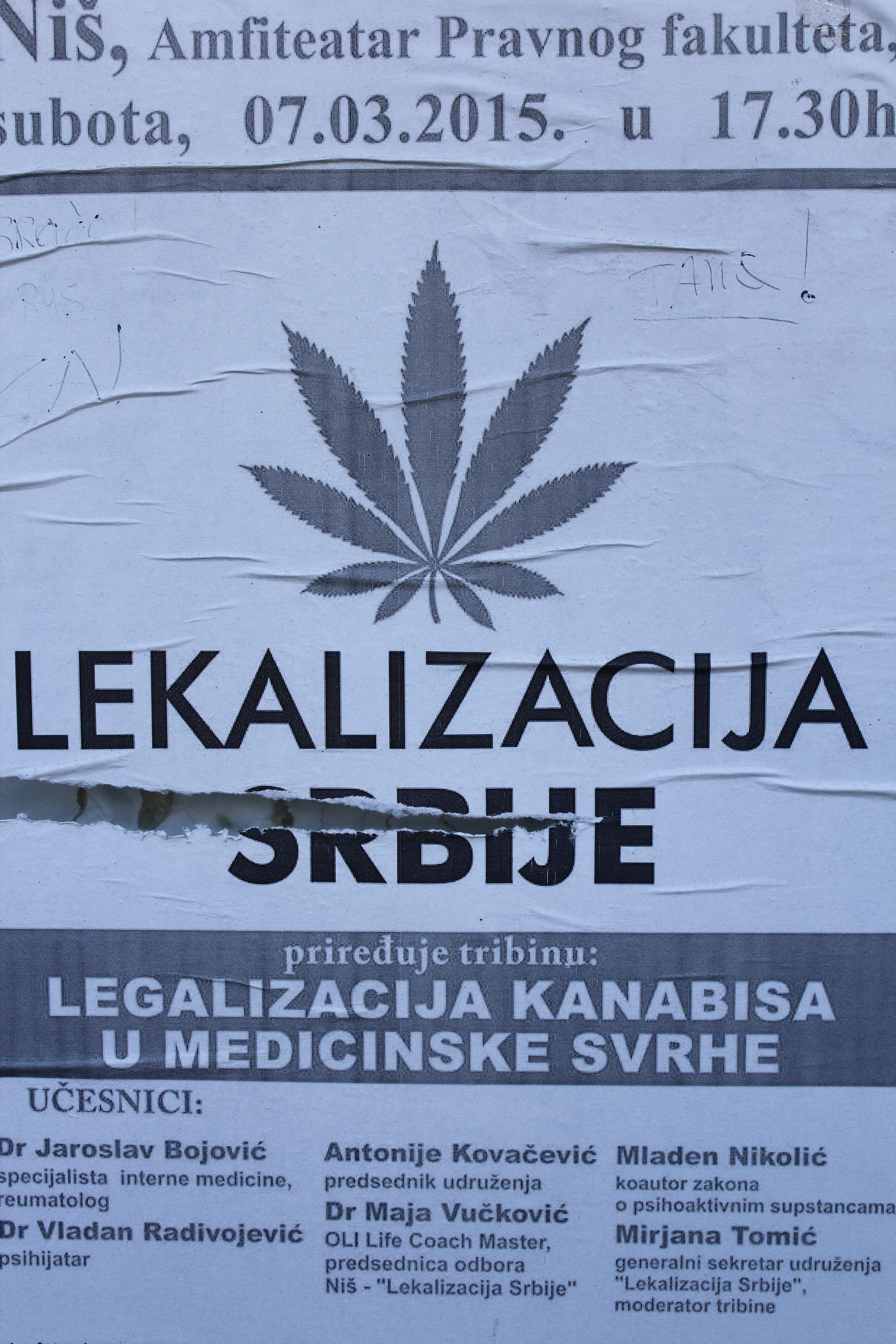
Advertisement for a panel on medical marijuana organized by Lekalizacija Srbije in the University of Niš Faculty of Law on 7 March 2015

Cannabis in Serbia is illegal. Possession is punishable by a fine or by imprisonment of up to 3 years. Sale and transport are punishable by imprisonment from 3 to 12 years. Cultivation is punishable by imprisonment from 6 months to 5 years. Penalties are higher for organized crime.

== History ==
In the 1700s, Italian farmers and hempseed strains were brought to Serbia, making hemp an important crop there until the 1900s. Hempseed was a traditional aphrodisiac, and wearing hemp fiber was said to enhance a man's sexual strength.

The Kingdom of Yugoslavia ratified the Second International Opium Convention on 4 September 1929. The first law to sanction drug abuse was the Criminal Code of the Kingdom of Serbs, Croats and Slovenes passed on 27 January 1929 and which entered into force on 1 January 1930, which sets a prison sentence of up to 6 months for "serving" narcotic drugs in the section "Crimes against Public Health".

== Reform ==
The first Ganja March in Belgrade was held on 7 May 2005 and went smoothly with around 50 participants.

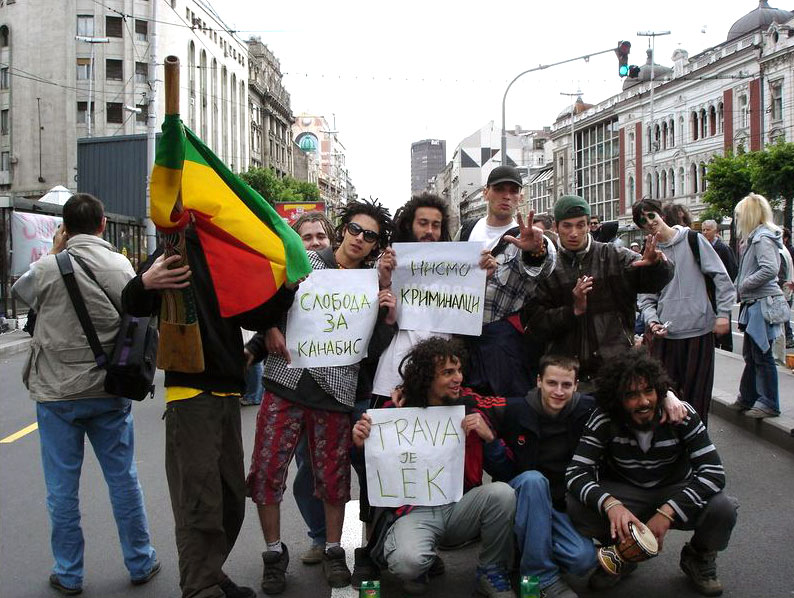
Protesters displaying the three-finger salute at the first Ganja March in Belgrade 2005.

The second Ganja March in Belgrade, organized by Damjan Pavlica, was scheduled to be held on 5 May 2007. However, on 3 May 2007 the Ministry of the Interior received a threatening email from a group calling themselves the United Patriots. The email was signed by Obraz, Nacionalni Stroj, Dveri, Krv i čast, Konačni obračun, the Tsar Lazar Guard and far-right politicians Kosta Čavoški, Siniša Vučinić and Goran Davidović. However, Kosta Čavoški denied having anything to do with the email claiming he was set up by anti-Serbian NGOs. The Dveri movement, as well as Mladen Obradović, the leader of Obraz, also denied having any part in the email. Željko Vasiljević, the leader of the Tsar Lazar Guard, distanced himself from any use of violence. Nevertheless, the march was canceled.

In February 2014 Health Minister Slavica Đukić Dejanović voiced support for the legalization of medical marijuana.

The first legal association advocating the legalization of medical marijuana in Serbia, the Initiative to Change the Cannabis Legislation (IRKA), was registered in early 2014.

On 5 November 2014 the Faculty of Political Sciences in Belgrade hosted a panel called "Times are Changing, Legalize It", organized by the libertarian group Students for Liberty. The event was interrupted when members of Serbian Action stormed the lecture hall and started harassing the students.

On 18 January 2015 an organization called Lekalizacija Srbije (a conflation of lek meaning medicine and legalizacija meaning legalization), advocating the legalization of medical marijuana was formed in Belgrade by journalist Antonije Kovačević. On 19 February 2015 the organization submitted a proposal to the Ministry of Health to legalize medical marijuana, citing several hundred cases of successful treatment. On 7 July 2015 in Belgrade's Mixer House, Lekalizacija Srbije organized a festival promoting medical marijuana called "One Plant, Many Good Things". One of the speakers was Slavica Đukić Dejanović.

On 4 September 2015 the IRKA initiative held the second (successful) Cannabis March in Belgrade, what they called a "gathering of the largest disenfranchised minority in Serbia". The march was attended by actor Sergej Trifunović.

In early 2016 the Expert Committee for the Use of Cannabis for Medical Purposes, composed by the Ministry of Health, proposed legalizing three cannabis-based drugs - Sativex, Dronabinol and Nabilone, and that cannabis oil should stay illegal.

On 24 September 2016 the IRKA initiative held the first Cannabis March in Novi Sad. The march was attended by pop singer Marina Perazić.

On 23 June 2017 Goran Čabradi, the leader and sole parliamentary representative of the Green Party, introduced a bill in the National Assembly to legalize medical marijuana in Serbia.
