= Jevrem Grujić's House =

Coordinates: 44.8142°N 20.4678°E

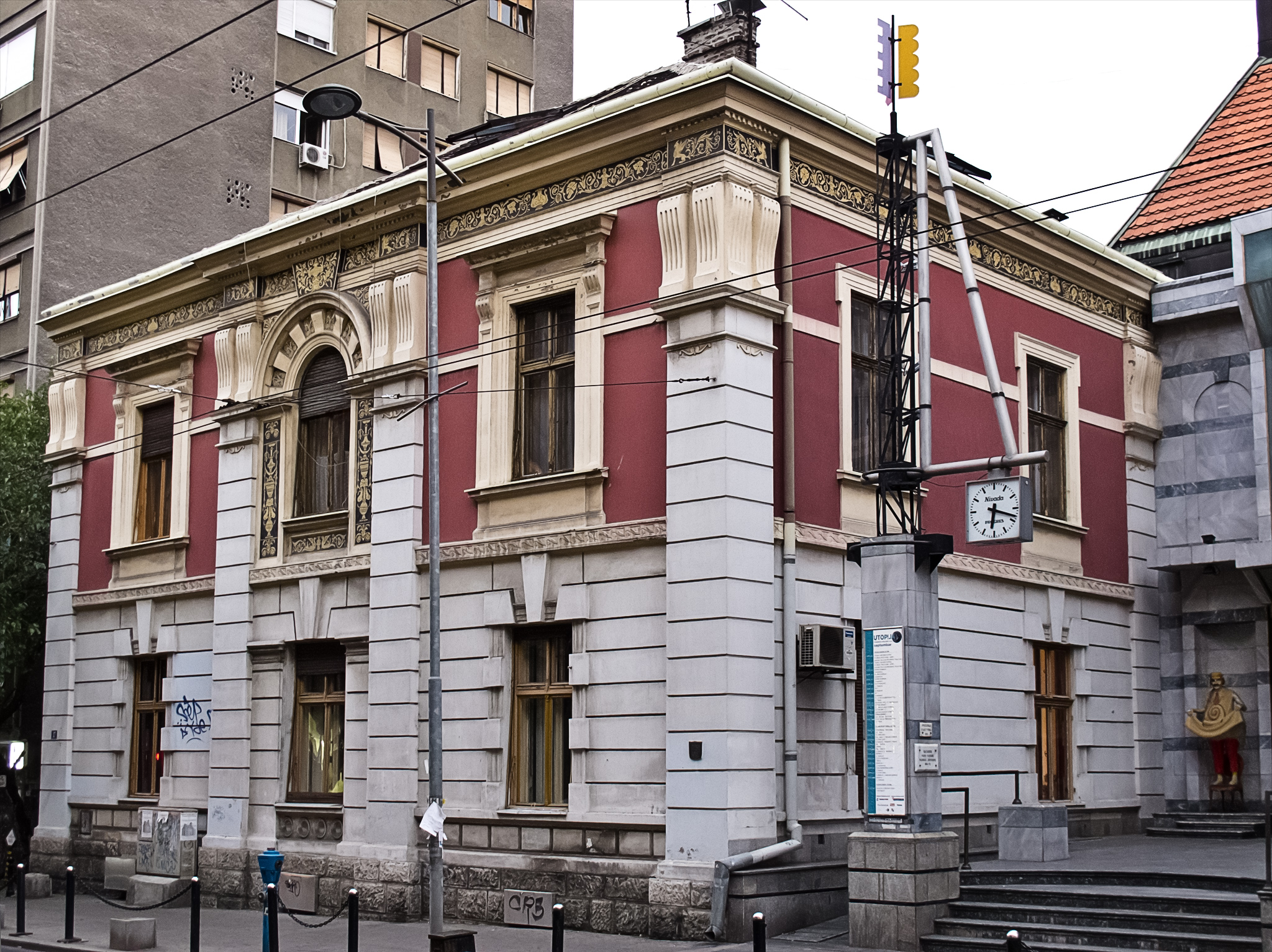
The House

The house of Jevrem Grujić is located in 17 Svetogorska Street, – the first designated heritage building since the founding of the Cultural Heritage Protection Institute of the City of Belgrade, in 1961. It is located in the immediate distance from the theatre "Atelje 212". The descendants of Jevrem Grujić, a prominent figure of the Serbian 19th century diplomacy, still live in this house. The life and work of members and descendants of the Grujić family is associated with the important political and social events in Serbia.

== Јevrem Grujić ==
For more information, see: Jevrem Grujić.

== The history ==
Jevrem Grujić built this two-storey house in 17 Svetogorska Street for his daughter Mirka, honorary lady-in waiting to Queen Marija Karađorđević and the chair of the "Kolo srpskih sestara". The house was built in 1896., according to the design of Milan Kapetanović, a Serbian architect educated in Munich, subsequently serving as a minister of construction.

== The look of the house ==
The mansion has three historicist facades harmoniously combining Renaissance and Baroque elements. In its own times it represented a typical town house designed according to the representation programme. The painted decoration in imitation of sgraffito makes it unique in the architecture of Belgrade. The painted decoration was the work of Domenico D'Andrea, an Italian master. In terms of the internal conception, the basis of the ground floor and the first floor are the same. The salon, the dining room and the kitchen were on the ground floor, and the bedrooms, the study, the library and the balcony overlooking the former garden were on the upper floor. The impressive entrance hall features white marble stairs with wrought-iron railings and a wall decorated with a composition in relief. The rich and diverse collection of movables, dating from the 18th, 19th and 20th centuries, comprises art works and utility objects, as well as the archival material. The arms collection from the First and Second Serbian Insurrections was awarded a golden diploma and a medal at the Balkan States Exhibition in London in 1907. The collection spans generations of the Grujić family – from Teodor Herbez, finance minister under Prince Miloš, Jevrem Grujić, Slavko Grujić, General Kosta Protić, Stevan Ćurčić and many other family members, prominent figures of the political and cultural life in Serbia. The interior is adorned with the works of the most important painters of the national art: Stevan Todorović, Uroš Predić, Paja Jovanović, Đorđe Krstić, Uroš Knežević, Arsenije Petrović, Miloš Tenković, Vlaho Bukovac as well as with the original pieces of furniture of different epochs. Along with the material values, the house also has intangible values. One of the important objects kept in this house is the wedding dress of Jelena Grujić from 1856.

== The House as the Witness of Time ==
The meeting on which the secret agreement was signed between Serbia and Bulgaria for the liberation of all South Slavs from the Turkish slavery was held in the house, in 1912. That agreement was later on the basis for the creation of the Balkan League. After The First World War ended, the house was Belgian embassy, where the first city balls and diplomatic receptions were organized, and after that, it was the French social society for providing help for children "A Drop of Milk". Right before the beginning of The Second World War the house was the meeting place of the female associations for the fight against the fascism, and since October 1944., in the days of the battles for the liberation of Belgrade, the partisan hospital was placed in the house. The house was visited by many important figures of Serbian politics and diplomacy, science and art, such as Jovan Cvijić, Simo Matavulj, Jovan Skerlić, Čeda Mijatović, Bogdan Popović, Milan Rakić, Đorđe Krstić, Stevan Todorović, Uroš Predić, Ivan Tabaković, dr Vukić Mićović as well as the members of the European noble families and other reputable persons. Milovan Milovanović, a minister of foreign affairs and the Prime Minister of the Serbian government (1911. – 1912.) used to live in the house. Jevrem Grujić's house is now a memorial place, the witness of many important political and cultural events, where, thanks to the descendants, the cultural heritage, tradition, national identity and avant-garde thoughts of Serbian society are continuously kept and preserved.

== The Recent History of the House ==
In the basement of the house in 1967. the first Belgrade's disco club "At Laza Šećer's" was opened, named after its owner and Jevrem's descendant, a translator Lazar Šećerović.

== Literature ==
- The catalogue of immovable cultural assets of the <Cultural Heritage Protection Institute of the City of Belgrade „Jevrem Grujić`s house“, G.Gordić, Lazar Šećerović, Belgrade 2007.
- The file of the cultural monuments, Jevrem Grujić's house“, The Cultural Heritage Protection Institute of the City of Belgrade
- Divna Đurić-Zamolo, The builders of Belgrade 1815–1914, Belgrade 2009.
