= 2016 Serbian parliamentary election =

Parliamentary election in Serbia

- 24 April 2016
- All 250 seats in the National Assembly; 126 seats needed for a majority
- Turnout: 56.07% (▲2.98pp)
Party	Leader	Vote %	Seats	+/–
SNS coalition	Aleksandar Vučić	49.71	131	−27
SPS–JS–ZS–KP	Ivica Dačić	11.28	29	−15
SRS	Vojislav Šešelj	8.34	22	+22
DJB	Saša Radulović	6.21	16	+16
DS coalition	Bojan Pajtić	6.20	16	−3
DSS–Dveri	Sanda Rašković Ivić	5.19	13	+13
SDS–LDP–LSV	Boris Tadić	5.17	13	−2
Minority lists
VMSZ–VMDP	István Pásztor	1.54	4	−2
BDZS	Muamer Zukorlić	0.89	2	New
SDAS	Sulejman Ugljanin	0.82	2	−1
ZES	Goran Čabradi	0.65	1	New
PVD	Riza Halimi	0.44	1	−1
This lists parties that won seats. See the complete results below.
Results by municipality
Prime Minister before	Prime Minister after
Aleksandar Vučić; SNS	Aleksandar Vučić; SNS

Parliamentary elections were held in Serbia on 24 April 2016. Initially, the election were originally due to be held by March 2018, but on 17 January 2016 Prime Minister Aleksandar Vučić called for a snap election claiming Serbia "needs four more years of stability so that it is ready to join the European Union". The elections were held simultaneously with provincial elections in Vojvodina and nationwide local elections.

Voter turnout was 56%. Vučić's Serbian Progressive Party-led coalition retained its majority, winning 131 of the 250 seats. In contrast to the 2014 elections, a record-breaking seven non-minority lists passed the 5% threshold. Several parties returned to the National Assembly, including the Serbian Radical Party, the Liberal Democratic Party and the Democratic Party of Serbia, while three parties entered for the first time; the liberal Enough is Enough, the conservative Dveri (in coalition with the Democratic Party of Serbia) and the Green Party (as a Slovak ethnic minority list).

Vučić announced formation of the new government by early June. He stated that the Alliance of Vojvodina Hungarians were the only certain partners in the cabinet, and remained ambiguous about the future cooperation with the Socialist Party of Serbia, the coalition partners in the previous government. After a two-month delay, Vučić announced the new cabinet on 8 August, consisting of eight old and eight new ministers, retaining the coalition with the Socialist Party. The government was approved by the National Assembly on 10 August.

== Electoral system ==
The 250 members of the National Assembly are elected by proportional representation in a single nationwide constituency with a 5% electoral threshold (with the percentages calculated including the invalid and blank votes cast), although the threshold is disregarded for coalitions representing ethnic minorities. Seats are allocated using the d'Hondt method.

=== Election in Kosovo ===
Serbia does not recognise Kosovo as an independent state and sees Kosovo as a province of Serbia. This meant that the Serbian government also wanted to count votes in Kosovo. However, the Kosovan government did not allow the Serbian Election Commission to organise election, deeming it a violation of its sovereignty. However, Kosovo recognises dual citizenship, which offered the possibility of its Serb citizens voting in Serbian elections. As a result, OSCE and the Kosovan government agreed that while Serbian election official would not have a role in the elections in Kosovo, five vote collection centres would be provided in different parts of Kosovo. Two of these were in the north and three in the south. OSCE guaranteed that the votes were collected accordingly in line with the rules and procedures. Corresponding arrangements had been made for previous Serbian parliamentary elections in 2012 and 2014.

== Campaign ==
In November 2014 Dveri and the Democratic Party of Serbia declared that they would contest the elections as the "Patriotic Bloc" alliance. In January 2015 PULS and SLS also joined the bloc.

On 19 February 2016, the Party of United Pensioners of Serbia (PUPS) decided to leave the coalition with SPS, and sign an agreement with SNS, as did the SDPS.

DS, SDS and the LDP agreed to form a coalition called "Democratic Serbia - DS-LDP-SDS", with Dragoljub Mićunović as the leader. However, on 28 February DS leader Bojan Pajtić said that his party would not join the SDS and the LDP in a pre-election coalition.

== Electoral lists ==
The Republic Electoral Commission (RIK) published an official list of competing parties and coalitions.

#	Ballot name	Ballot carrier	Main ideology	Political position	Note
1	Aleksandar Vučić – Serbia is Winning; SNS (with NSS, USS, SDSS), SDPS, PS, PUPS, NS, PSS–BK, SNP, SPO	Aleksandar Vučić	Populism	Big tent	
2	For A Just Serbia – Democratic Party; DS, NS, RS, ŽZK, DSHV, ZZS, ZZŠ	Bojan Pajtić	Social democracy	Centre-left	
3	Ivica Dačić – SPS – JS – Dragan Marković Palma"; SPS, JS, KP, ZS	Ivica Dačić	Populism	Big tent	
4	Dr Vojislav Šešelj – Serbian Radical Party; SRS	Vojislav Šešelj	Ultranationalism	Far-right	
5	Dveri – DSS – Sanda Rašković Ivić – Boško Obradović; Dveri, DSS, SLS, NSPM	Sanda Rašković Ivić	Conservatism	Right-wing to far-right	
6	Alliance of Vojvodina Hungarians – István Pásztor; SVM	Bálint Pásztor	Minority interests	Centre-right	^{M}
7	Boris Tadić, Čedomir Jovanović – Alliance for a Better Serbia – LDP, LSV, SDS; LDP, LSV, SDS, NPS	Nenad Čanak	Social democracy	Centre-left	
8	Muamer Zukorlić – Bosniak Democratic Union of Sandžak; BDZS	Muamer Zukorlić	Minority interests		^{M}
9	Party of Democratic Action of Sandžak – Dr Sulejman Ugljanin; SDAS	Sulejman Ugljanin	Minority interests	Right-wing	^{M}
10	For a Free Serbia – Oathkeepers – Milica Đurđević; SSZ	Božidar Zečević	Ultranationalism	Far-right	
11	Citizen's Group "For Serbia's Revival" – Prof Dr Slobodan Komazec; ZSP	Jovan Deretić	Conspiracy theorism	Right-wing	
12	Russian Party – Slobodan Nikolić; RS	Slobodan Nikolić	National conservatism	Right-wing	
13	Republican Party – Nikola Sandulović; RS	Nikola Sandulović	Minority interests		^{M}
14	Serbo-Russian Movement – Slobodan Dimitrijević; IA, SL, SDF, PV, ML	Dragan Todorović	National conservatism	Right-wing	
15	Borko Stefanović – Serbia for all of us; SL, PZP, SDU, NPA	Borko Stefanović	Social democracy	Centre-left	
16	Dialogue – Youth with a stance – Stanko Debeljaković; Dialogue	Stanko Debeljaković	Liberalism	Centre	
17	Enough is Enough – Restart – Saša Radulović; DJB	Saša Radulović	Social liberalism	Centre	
18	Party for Democratic Action – Ardita Sinani; PDD	Ardita Sinani	Minority interests	Centre-right	^{M}
19	Green Party; ZS	Goran Čabradi	Minority interests	Centre-left	^{M}
20	Out of Spite – United for Serbia – National Alliance; TS, NM	Vladan Glišić	National conservatism	Far-right	

^{M} — National minority list

== Results ==
Party	Votes	%	Seats	+/–
Serbia is Winning (SNS–SDPS–PUPS–NS–SPO–PS–PSS–NSS–SNP)	1,823,147	49.71	131	–39
SPS–JS–ZS	413,770	11.28	29	–4
Serbian Radical Party	306,052	8.34	22	+22
Enough is Enough	227,626	6.21	16	+16
For a Just Serbia (DS–NS–RS–DSHV–ZZS–ZZŠ)	227,589	6.20	16	–5
Dveri–Democratic Party of Serbia	190,530	5.19	13	+13
Alliance for a Better Serbia (LDP–LSV–SDS)	189,564	5.17	13	–2
VMSZ–VMDP	56,620	1.54	4	–2
Serbia for All of Us (PLS–PZP–NUPS–SDU)	35,710	0.97	0	New
Bosniak Democratic Union of Sandžak	32,526	0.89	2	+2
Party of Democratic Action of Sandžak	30,092	0.82	2	–1
For A Free Serbia – Oathkeepers	27,690	0.75	0	New
Green Party	23,890	0.65	1	New
Out of spite – United for Serbia – National Alliance	17,528	0.48	0	New
Party for Democratic Action	16,262	0.44	1	–1
Russian Party	13,777	0.38	0	0
Citizen's Group – For Serb Revival	13,260	0.36	0	New
Serbo-Russian Movement	10,016	0.27	0	New
Dialogue – Youth with a Stance	7,744	0.21	0	New
Republican Party	4,522	0.12	0	New
Total	3,667,915	100.00	250	0
Valid votes	3,667,915	97.06		
Invalid/blank votes	111,008	2.94		
Total votes	3,778,923	100.00		
Registered voters/turnout	6,739,441	56.07		
Source: RIK

== Aftermath ==
After the polls closed, it soon became clear that the Serbian Progressive Party would maintain its absolute majority in the Assembly, albeit with a smaller number of MPs, and that their partners, the Socialist Party of Serbia, would maintain their standing. However, the Republic Electoral Commission (RIK) and organizations monitoring the election (such as CeSID) were cautious about the results of most other lists, as they hovered around the 5% threshold. For a while, it looked as if all seven main contestants would pass the threshold, but as the Commission published the final results on Thursday 28 April, the DSS-Dveri coalition ended up a single vote short. Tensions ran high, as the participants started to accuse each other and the Commission of fraud, which along with demolition of Savamala resulted in protests. Still, there were additional 18,000 votes to share, as voting had to be repeated at 15 polling stations due to irregularities. In the re-run held on 4 May, DSS–Dveri comfortably won the required number of votes and ended up with 5.03% of the electorate. The Electoral Commission released the final results of the election on Thursday 5 May.

Vučić announced formation of the new government by early June. He stated that the Alliance of Vojvodina Hungarians were the only certain partners in the cabinet, and remained ambiguous about the future cooperation with the Socialist Party of Serbia, the coalition partners in the previous government, hinting that he will "certainly not form a government with someone who can't wait to stab him in the back."

Constitutive session of the new parliament was held on 3 June. Maja Gojković of Serbian Progressive Party was re-elected president, and six vice-presidents from major parliamentary clubs were elected. The seventh vice-presidential seat, reserved for Enough is Enough, was left unfilled after the movement refused to propose their candidate despite previous agreement.

Formation of the new government, however, took much longer than announced. On 23 July PM-designate Aleksandar Vučić said he was not ruling out the possibility that Serbia's government could be "formed by somebody else at his proposal", stating that "we have problems, this is not about some kind of whim", but without elaborating the details. Fueled by hints from Vučić and statements made by his associates, media started speculating on external pressures, pointing at Western and Russian attempts to influence personal solutions in the new cabinet. President Nikolić expressed "full understanding" that the government had not been formed yet, and stated that the only important thing is that the constitutional deadlines [three months from constitution of the Assembly] are met.

Vučić announced the new cabinet on 8 August, consisting of eight old and eight new ministers, retaining a coalition with the Socialist Party. The government was approved by the National Assembly on 10 August.
