= BIGZ building =

Building in Belgrade, Serbia

- Зграда БИГЗ-а
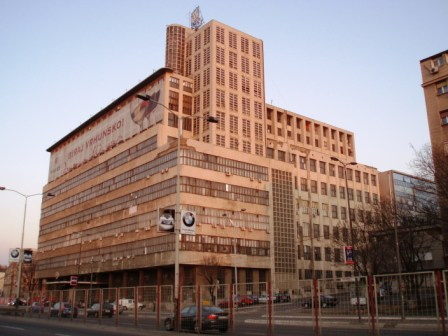
- BIGZ building from outside

- Location within Belgrade
- Former names: State Press House
- Etymology: Acronym for Beogradski izdavačko-grafički zavod (Belgrade Publishing Institute)

General information
- Status: Cultural monument (1992)
- Architectural style: Modernism
- Location: 17 Bulevar vojvode Mišića, Belgrade, Serbia
- Coordinates: 44.796911°N 20.446263°E
- Construction started: 1936
- Completed: 1941

Height
- Height: 64 m (210 ft)

Technical details
- Floor area: 35,000 m^{2} (376,700 sq ft)

The BIGZ building (Serbian: Зграда БИГЗ-а, romanized: Zgrada BIGZ-a) is a building located in Belgrade, the capital of Serbia. Designed by Dragiša Brašovan, it is one of the most representative architectural landmarks of Serbian modern architecture. A monumental building, with its position, volume and aesthetics, it dominates the entrance in the southern section of Belgrade. It remained the tallest building in Belgrade for 23 years, until being surpassed by Ušće Tower 1 in 1964.

It has been protected since 1992. In recent times it represents a significant cultural, artistic and social spot.

== Location ==
The BIGZ building is located at 17 Bulevar vojvode Mišića, in the Mostar section of the Senjak neighborhood, west of the Mostar looped interchange on the Highway Belgrade–Niš. Just east of the building is the Radisson Collection Hotel, Old Mill Belgrade, declared a cultural monument in 1987. Across the Bulevar vojvode Mišića, the facilities of the Belgrade Fair are located.

With its height and monumentality, it dominates the skyline and presents a reference point not only for the neighbourhood, but for the whole right Sava bank. It is also clearly visible from the highway and is a welcoming message for tourists and commuters entering old section of Belgrade from the New Belgrade direction via highway and its Gazela Bridge.

== History ==
=== Origin ===
First Serbian Printing House was founded in 1831. Originally in Kragujevac, Serbian capital at the time, it was moved to Belgrade in 1835. In the next hundred years it changed address several times, but always in the neighborhoods of Kosančićev Venac and Varoš Kapija. When city administration decided to build the bridge across the Sava river in the early 1930s, (future King Alexander Bridge), demolition of several dozens of buildings for the creation of the access road became imminent, including the building of the press house.

As 1931 was a centennial of the press house founding, an architectural competition plan was announced for the new building. The edifice was to be built in the neighborhood of Kalenića Gumno. Ministry of Education announced the winner in April 1933 and it was a design by architect Dragiša Brašovan. The problem emerged as the proposed building was too massive and robust for the old section of Vračar. City of Belgrade then decided to cut several new streets through this area, further reducing the plot chosen for the building.

Ministry then decided to relocate the project and construct the building on the lot of the Gođevac brothers, in the industrial zone between the neighborhood of Senjak and the bank of the Sava. The projected edifice suited much better the industrial environment, but certain revision of the project was necessary, especially regarding the height. Brašovan travelled through Europe to visit various large press houses in order to refine his project and make it more modern and functional. He mostly used German sources.

=== Construction ===
Construction began in June 1936. The building was finished in May 1940, but the equipment wasn't installed until February 1941. It was the first building in Serbian architecture which consistently implemented structural frame made of reinforced concrete. As the building is massive and robust, to accommodate large number of printing presses which were very large themselves at the time, it is also quite heavy. The solution for the structural load was over one meter thick plate of reinforced concrete on which the entire building rests. To ease the pressure, Brašovan designed the building in the shape of the Cyrillic letter P (П), which also was the shape of the printing press.

The press house was to become operational in the autumn of 1941 but this was prevented by the April's massive German bombardment of Belgrade, as part of the Axis Invasion of Yugoslavia in World War II. The building was heavily damaged.

=== World War II ===
In 1943, as part of the strategic bombing campaign within the scopes of the oil campaign against Nazi Germany, the U.S. began massive bombardment of the oil fields and refineries in Romania, known as the Operation Tidal Wave campaign. On their return, as Belgrade was important strategic point, the bombers threw their unused bombs on the city. German occupational forces dug several pools across the city to storage water for extinguishing the fires. One of such pools was built next to the building. In time, citizens began to use the pools for swimming and the Germans didn't try to stop them so they became sort of public swimming pools. The pools were ultimately re-filled by 1950.

=== Post-war ===
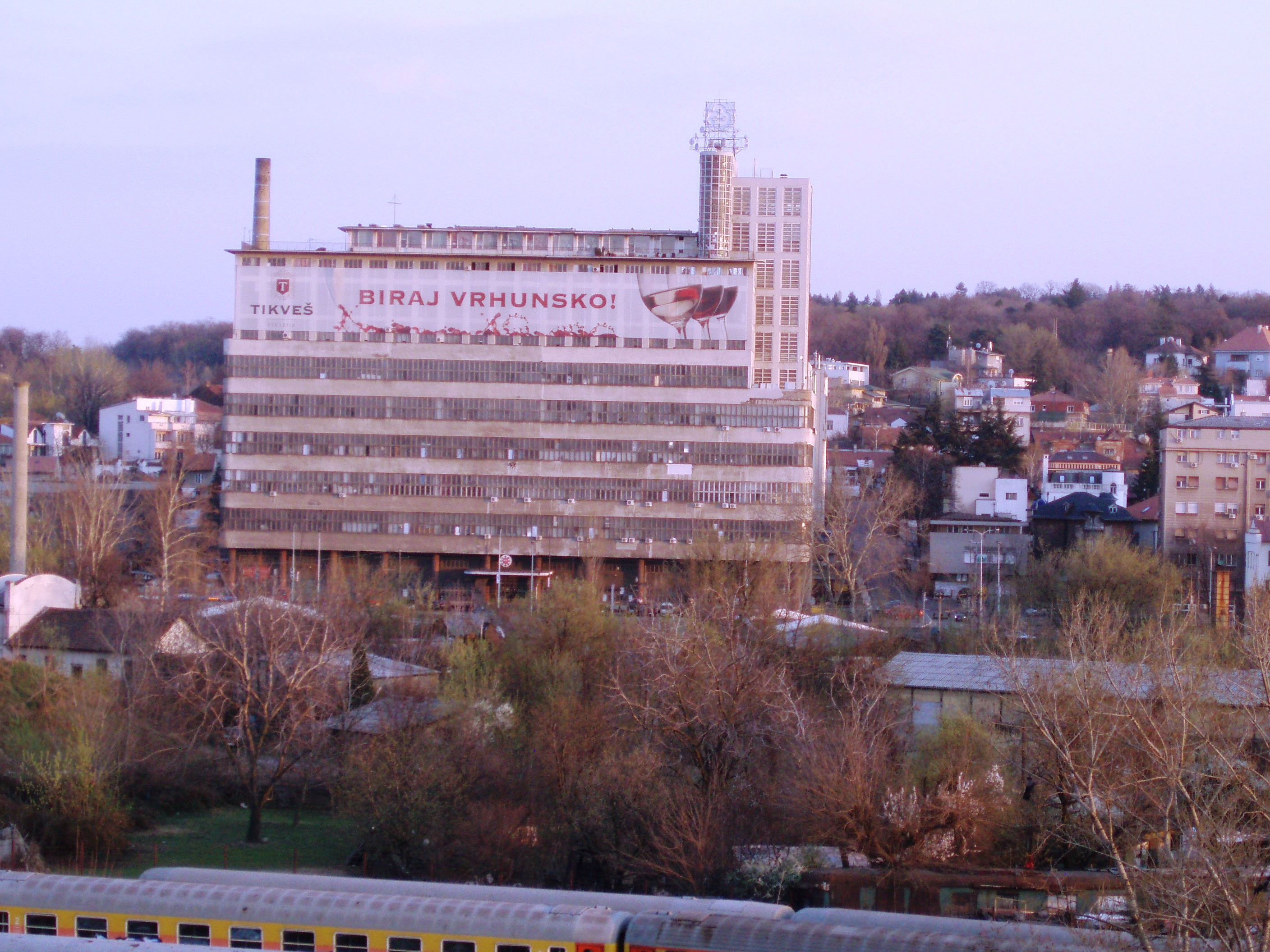
BIGZ building

Though still not repaired, printing began in preserved parts of the building in 1944, after the liberation from the Nazis. The building was reconstructed and the State Press House was renamed to "Jugoštampa" in 1946. In 1955 it merged with three other publishing companies ("Jugoslavija", "Omladina" and "Rad") into "Beogradski Grafički Zavod", which, in turn, was renamed "Beogradski Grafičko-Izdavački Zavod" (with acronym BIGZ) in 1970.

After World War II ended, the Belgrade's Publishing and Graphics Institution (Beogradski izdavačko-grafički zavod, abr. BIGZ) was founded and seated in the building, hence the building was subsequently named after it. At that time, it was the largest printing company in the Balkans, printing mostly pocket books in huge numbers.

From the late 1940s to the 1980s, the company employed more than 3,000 workers. After the social and economic crisis of the early 1990s, lack of funding left the building mostly unused and neglected. By the turn of the millennium it has slowly began to get occupied by few small businesses. Its modernist industrial design, big rooms and hallways, its isolation and relative distance from residential buildings has greatly attracted many young artists, designers, architects, musicians and DJs.

It has been declared a cultural monument, and placed under the state protection, in 1992.

=== 21st century ===
As of 2018, its units currently house printing offices, warehouses, music and art studios, night clubs, a capoeira school, radio-stations, a cultural center, a circus, etc. Among its more famous tenants is Čekaonica BIGZ, a jazz club. Since it contains such cultural, social and artistic diversity and richness, it somewhat unofficially became a centre of Belgrade's art life.

The BIGZ building is a very significant place for New Serbian Scene. Many bands practice in the building, such as: Vizelj, The Schtrebers, DžDž, Metak Za Zlikovca, Stuttgart Online, Autopark, Petrol, Repetitor, Sinestezija, Tobija, The Branka, Damjan od Resnika, Bolesna Štenad, Brigand, Figlio Di Puttana, Vox Populi, Dažd, S.A.R.S., Very Heavy Sars, Pozdravi Kevu, White City Massive, and many others. Musicians of the BIGZ building have founded an organization called "Manekeni bigza" (fashion models of BIGZ), and they organize several festivals like "Festivalito" and "Bigz na Povetarcu" (BIGZ on a breeze).

=== Privatization ===
The BIGZ company was the building's majority owner until 2007, when businessman Petar Matić, owner of MPC, purchased BIGZ from the state for 310 million dinars, or €3.87 million at that current prices. There are also other, minority owners, with the 80:20 ratio in favor of Matić.

Canadian company "Tippin Corporation", which is specialized in purchasing and renovating old edifices in central and eastern Europe, was interested in buying the BIGZ building. They planned to restore the façade to its full splendor, while the interior will be adapted in the modernized space for artists and musicians. Ultimately, they failed to reach an agreement with Matić regarding the price. In 2015 they offered Matić to buy from him 80% of his share, but he refused. "Tippin Corporation" offered a total of €30 million for purchase and investments.

Austrian company "Soravia" adapted the neighboring ruins of the Old Mill into the modern Radisson Collection hotel, building three additional glass towers (two for the hotel, one for rent) next to the BIGZ building. Hotel was opened in December 2014 and since 2015 "Soravia" has been in negotiations with Matić and minority owners to purchase the BIGZ building, too. In January 2018, mayor of Belgrade Siniša Mali announced that "Soravia" will buy the edifice and that reconstruction will be entrusted to the architect Daniel Liebeskind. Austrian company stated that the purchase might be concluded in February and that they plan to adapt the building into apartments, galleries, restaurants, business and artistic space, though they added that Liebeskind's involvement was "just an idea".

Instead, in January 2020, deputy mayor Goran Vesić announced the reconstruction of the building, starting in the spring, but nothing has been done. In January 2021, "Soravia" stated that it gave up on the property. They signed certain precontracts with the co-owners of the building, but ultimately backed off due to the "certain disputes". At the same time, it was announced that "Marera Properties", after negotiating with Matić since the mid-2018, will purchase the building for the total amount (price and future investments) of €50 million. The informal cultural center will be adapted into the business space for renting. Works are planned to start in the summer of 2022, and should be finished in 18 months, or by the end of 2023.

Just four months earlier, the "Marera Properties" acquired part of the Beograđanka building, even more iconic symbol of Belgrade, for the price of only 860 €/m2, which is considered "miserable" for downtown Belgrade. The company is founding separate companies for purchasing each building separately. Reporters discovered that "Marera Properties" basically exists only on paper, and that behind it is the Russian fund seated in Cyprus connected with offshore companies from the British Virgin Islands, which also recycles money from Serbia. Several present and former executives of the company turned out to be, directly or indirectly, connected to Siniša Mali, Serbian finance minister and former mayor of Belgrade. The company is connected to other controversial projects in Belgrade and in a short period of time acquired a number of real estates in Belgrade's prime zones, like the "Beko" building (K District), building of the former kafana "Pod Lipom", "Trudbenik" building, "Jugohemija" building, or Block 18 in New Belgrade. Given its way of doing business, local real estate agents stated it is obvious that "Marera Properties" does not invest the capital which is a result of the organic growth (money from one finished project being invested in the next job).

=== Reconstruction ===
Marera officially took over the building in February 2021, this time in partnership with the "Aleksandar Gradnja" company. Cleaning of the building began immediately, and the current tenants were given 120 days to vacate the premises. It was already announced that numerous later additions to the interior, like the new walls, will be demolished, but the exterior of the building has to be preserved. "Remorker Architects" studio is doing the renovation project. In August 2022 it was announced that the façade will be finished by the end of 2022, while the complete renovation will be finished by the spring of 2023. Though the first tenants were planned to move-in in July 2023, the deadline for the completion was pushed back to September 2023.

== Architecture ==
The building is one of the most characteristic architectural markers of modernist architecture in Serbia. The building is monumental and dominant, both due to its design and location. Despite deteriorated by the 2020s, its "robust beauty and industrial appearance are still powerful".

Basic layout was work of Ukrainian émigré architect Pavel Krat, who based it on the works of the Vesnin brothers and touch of suprematistic ideas of Kazimir Malevich regarding layout of white squares. Brašovan then incorporated characteristics of Russian constructivism, Bauhaus and Czech cubism.

The building appears as if it is made of four, massive square boxes placed horizontally, and one erected vertically. Discreet nods to the Bauhaus style are evident in the round, brittle-appearing extension surrounding the staircase at the very top of the building, and an elegant fence on the roof terrace with candelabra which appears to be hanging when looked from below. The terrace itself differs from the rest of the building, resembling a deck of an ocean liner or penthouse of a luxury hotel. It is an excellent scenic viewpoint on Belgrade and the Sava river. All five square sections of the facade have different shape and layout of the windows, partially indicating the purpose of the section. One of the horizontal sections has a basic form of the much lusher facade Brašovan will use after World War II on the Hotel Metropol.

The BIGZ building was the first edifice in Belgrade with the skeletal carrier system made of reinforced concrete. The building rests on the reinforced concrete slab over 1 metre (3 ft 3 in) thick, which allowed Brašovan great leniency in solving the complicated internal structure of the building. The solutions for the foundations, exterior and interior were considered at the time much more radical than the usual way of construction. Despite the modern skeletal system, the building doesn't appear to "hover" - it is quite massive and sturdy, and appears even bigger from the inside. With two monumental symmetrical staircases, elevators in metal cages and apparently endless, half-illuminated labyrinth of corridors, it resembles sets from the Fritz Lang's 1927 film Metropolis.

The building has a total floor area of 25,000 m^{2} (270,000 sq ft), with additional 10,000 m^{2} (110,000 sq ft) of corridors and has been neglected for decades.

Most recently the BIGZ building is in the process of inclusion to Docomomo International project's list for protection and preservation as a cultural monument of modernist architecture.

== See also ==
- New Serbian Scene
- Serbian art
- Docomomo International
