= Damjan od Resnika =

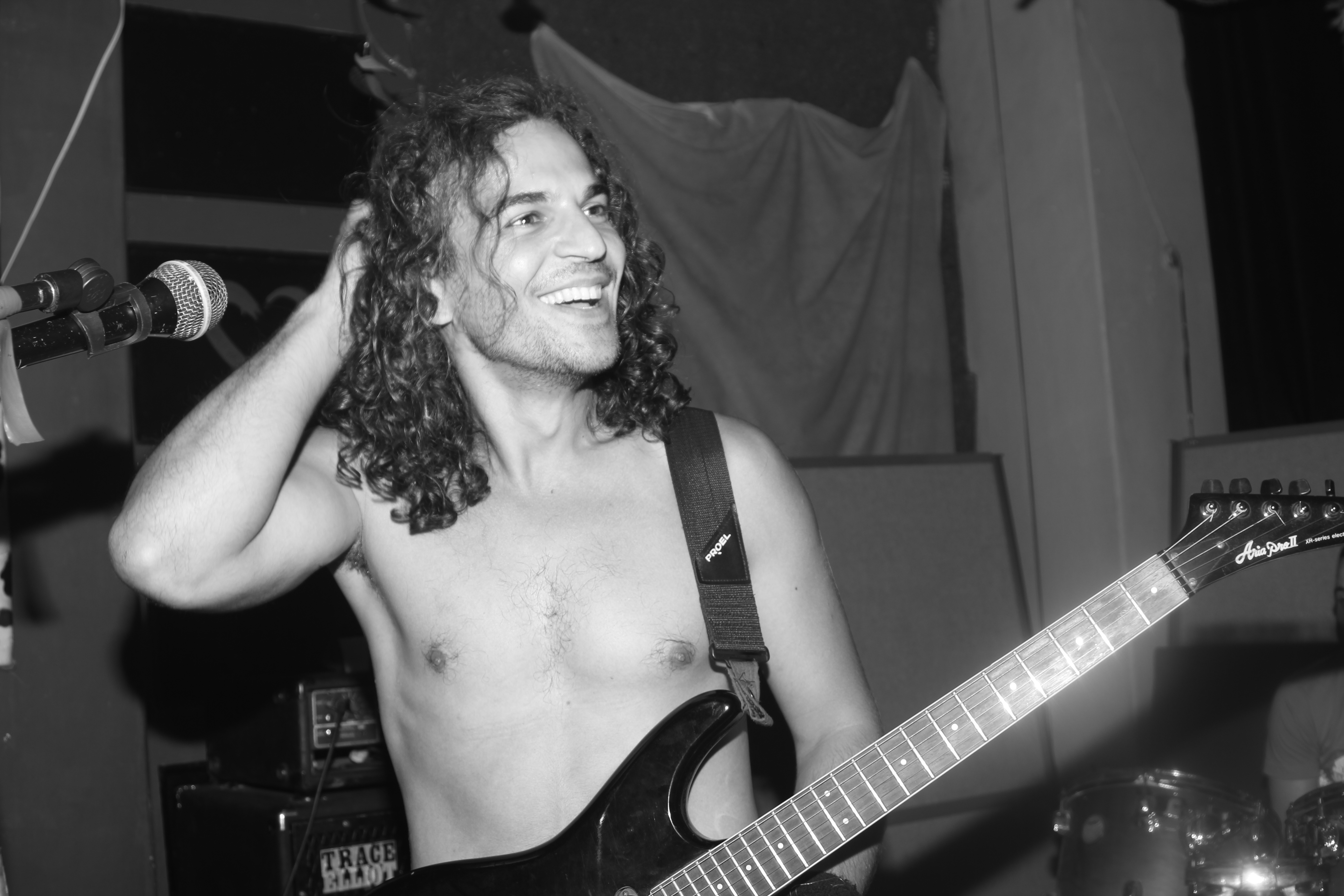
- Damjan Pavlica, frontman

Background information
- Origin: Belgrade, Serbia
- Genres: Alternative rock, pop rock, new wave, ambient
- Years active: 2004 – present
- Labels: Listen Loudest, Fairshare
- Members: Damjan Pavlica; Zorica Vujović; Filip Banjeglav
- Past members: Ivana Blažević; Miloš Bakalović; Nemanja Jovanović

Damjan od Resnika (English: Damjan of Resnik) is an alternative rock music project from Serbia, led by singer-songwriter Damjan Pavlica.

== History ==
Damjan Pavlica recording his songs in a home studio since 2004. He published the first few demos on "Neradnik" compilation in 2005.

In 2009, Pavlica put together a band whose lineup changed frequently, the key members were Ivana Blažević on violin, Miloš Bakalović on drums and percussion and Nemanja Jovanović on bass and accordion. Damjan od Resnika was established in the old BIGZ building, which is known as the absolute epicenter of independent music being produced in Belgrade. The band held several concerts at Belgrade clubs. and festival Prnjavorstock.

In late 2010 and early 2011, Damjan has organized the recording of the first studio album Pored vatre ("By the Fire"), which was released in mid-2011. This acoustic album was recorded in his home studio RLZ, with various musicians and live instruments, including accordion, violin, double bass, guitar, blues harp, gusli, percussion and didgeridoo. According to critics, "more than half of the album is very boring and pathetic", except the "two great songs": Mlade mame and "the protest anthem" Moja država.

In 2012, Damjan released his second studio album titled Protiv tebe ("Against You"), "much rawer and more aggressive". All songs played, sung and produced by Damjan Pavlica alone. Lyrically, social themes were at the forefront, "mainly despair and the hope that is born from it." According to music zine Terapija.net, this album "not only that it is completely different, but it is also one of the best achievements of this year's ex-Yugoslavian scene".

2013 Damjan released his third studio album titled Treći album ("Third Album") with the help of local musicians, including neighbours musicians from popular band S.A.R.S. With the third album the project has reached the mainstream media. Shortly after the releasing, frontman Damjan Pavlica presented this album on national radio B92. Reviewer on the Croatian magazine Terapija.net wrote: "I do not remember, except for those times of the Yugoslav new wave that any band in such a short period so far advanced."

== Discography ==
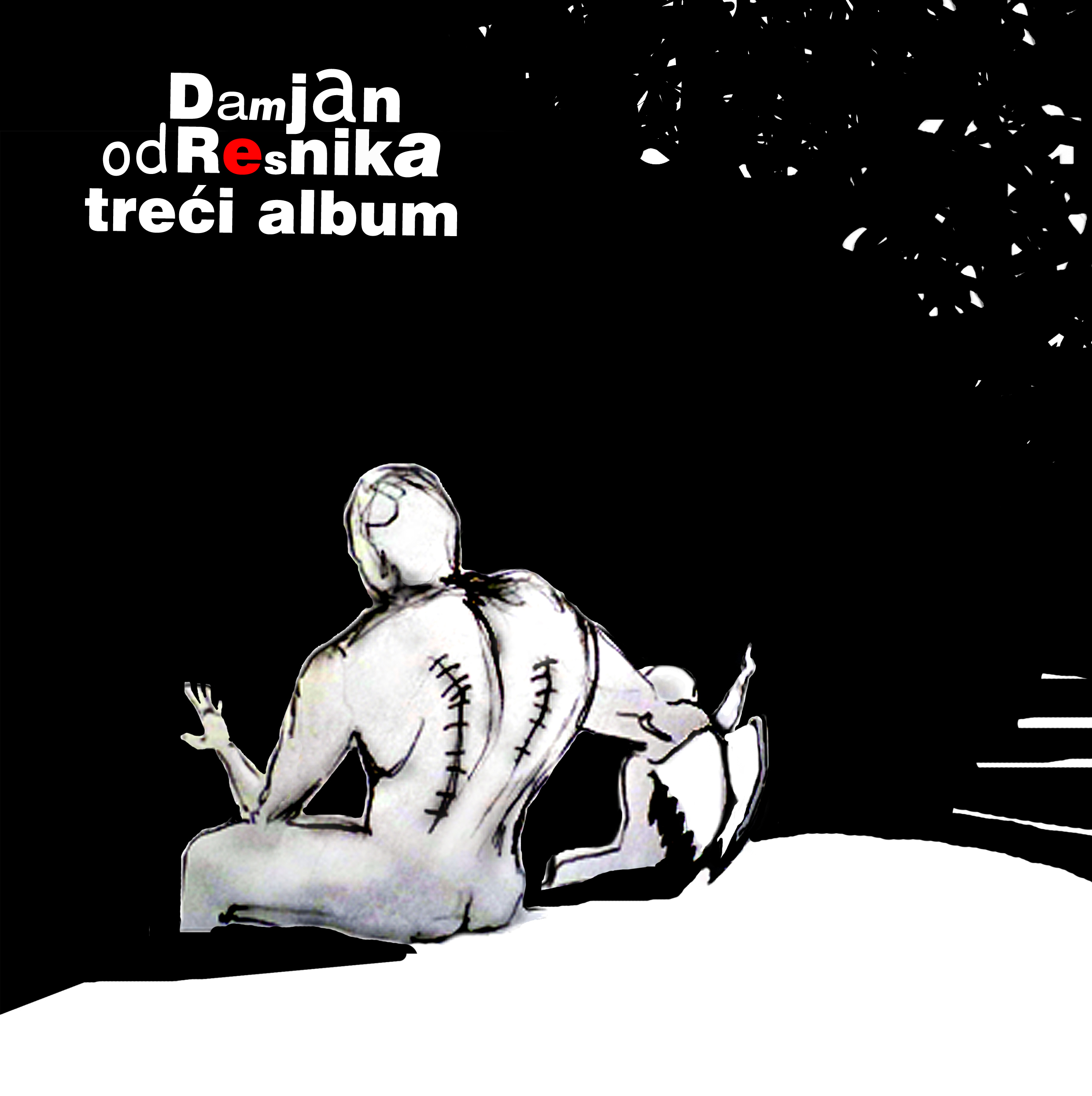
Damjan od Resnika, Treći album

=== Studio albums ===
- Pored vatre (2011)
- Protiv tebe (2012)
- Treći album (2013)

=== Other appearances ===
- "Rokanje Nikad nije stalo" (Neradnik, 2005)
- "Zgrada je živa!" (Manekeni Bigza, 2009)
