= Božidar Zečević =

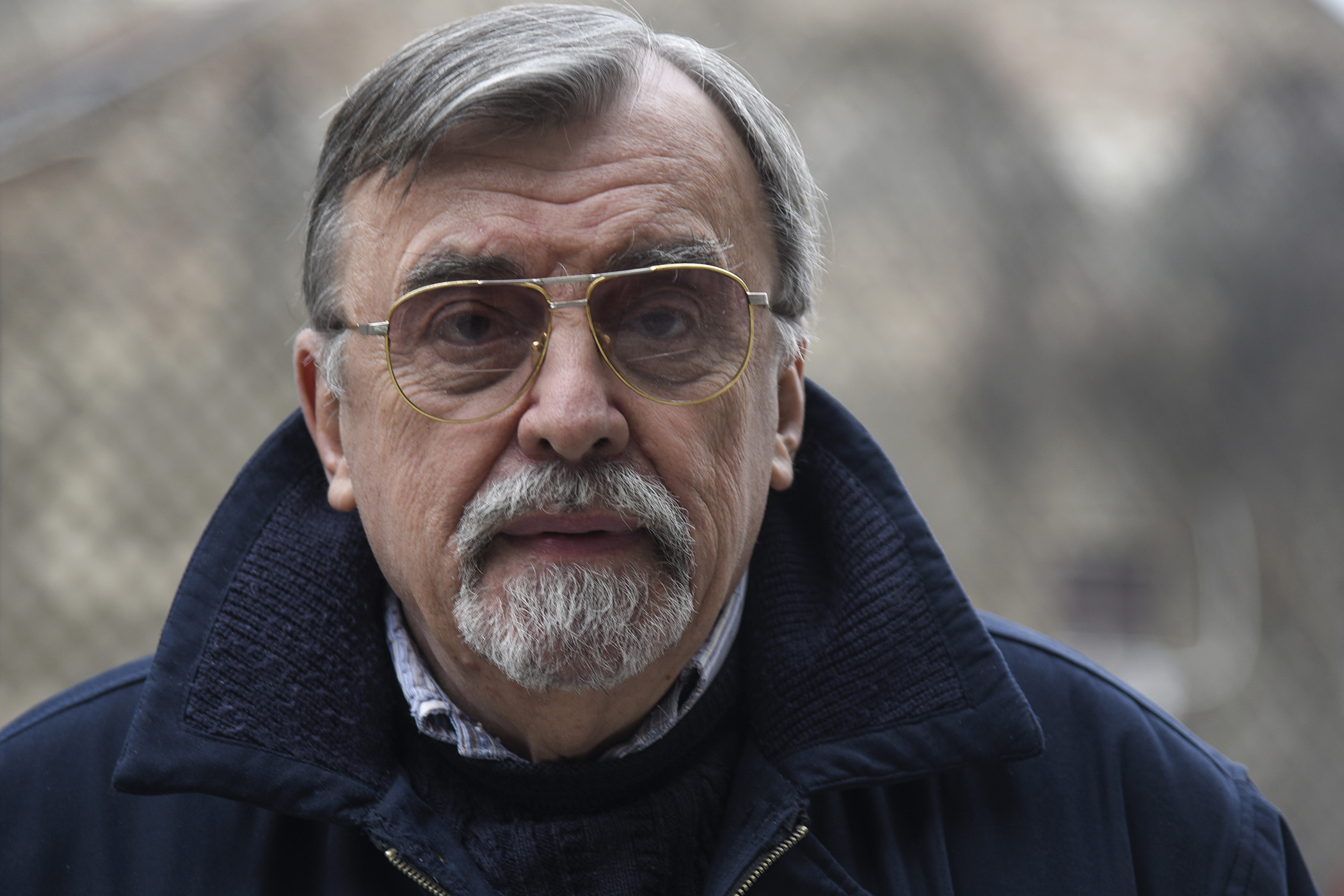
- Born: January 2, 1948 (age 78); Belgrade, SFR Yugoslavia
- Education: The Theatre, Film and Radio Academy, Belgrade (now Faculty of Dramatic Arts)
- Occupations: writer, director, screenwriter, critic, theorist, esthetist, pedagogue

Božidar Zečević (born January 2, 1948 in Belgrade) is a Serbian filmologist, film historian, dramatist, screenwriter, director, university professor of film analysis, founder and editor-in-chief of the film journal Filmograf.

== Biography ==
He graduated from the Faculty of Dramatic Arts in Belgrade, was the Fulbright Visiting Scholar at the University of Southern California in Los Angeles and New York University, NY and postgraduate at the UN University of Peace in Belgrade.

Since 1966 he published a number of books and studies, lectured at universities in Serbia, USA and Europe. He was awarded "Golden Pen for Film Criticism" and "Golden Pen for the Best Book on Film" of the Belgrade Film Institute (for the book Čitanje svetla /Reading the Light/).

He was the Head of the Film Museum of the Yugoslav Film Archive /Jugoslovenska kinoteka/ in Belgrade. He is a member of the European Film Academy, member of the Presidency and the President of the Board of filmology and film history of the Serbian Academy for Film Arts and Sciences.

He was a winner of the Plaque for an outstanding contribution of the Yugoslav Film Archive, Charter of the Belgrade Film Festival, Filmmakers Guild Award for filmological contribution etc.

As a film director and scriptwriter he made over a hundred of feature and documentary films and TV projects. He won the Annual Award of the national Television of Serbia for his TV serial "Yugoslavia in War 1941–1945" and Special Award of the Jury at the "Golden Knight" Film Festival in Moscow for his documentary "A Truth of March 27".

He was a professor of film theory at the Faculty of Dramatic Arts in Belgrade and a professor of film analysis at the school of "Dunav Film". He is editor in several journals, and founder and editor-in-chief of Filmograf journal.

His theatrical plays Pivara, Selektor, 1918 and 1968 were performed on the scenes in Belgrade and Serbia. He won the "Branislav Nušić" Award of the Association of Playwrights of Serbia for the Pivara, and for 1918 he was awarded the "Joakim Vujić" award for the best drama at the festival of professional Serbian theaters of the same name.

He is a member of the board of directors of the Association of Film Artists of Serbia as well as the member of Presidency of the Association of Drama Writers of Serbia.

He lives and works in Belgrade.

== Theatrical plays ==
- 1918., in: "Savremena srpska drama" ("Contemporary Serbian Drama"), Book 45 (2011) (in Serbian)
- Pivara, in: "Savremena srpska drama", Book 47 (2011) (in Serbian)

== Filmological monographs ==
- Čitanje svetla (Reading the Light), „Prosveta”, „YU film danas” i „Prometej”, Beograd — Novi Sad, 1993.
- Velimir Bata Živojinović, Filmski susreti, Festival glumačkih ostvarenja jugoslovenskog igranog filma, Niš, 1994.
- Filmske novosti 1944–2004.: monografija povodom šezdeset godina "Filmskih novosti" i organizovane kinematografske delatnosti u Srbiji i Crnoj Gori (Film News 1944–2004: monograph on the occasion of sixty years of "Film News" and organized cinematographic activities in Serbia and Montenegro), edited by Božidar Zečević, Filmske novosti, Beograd, 2004.
- Bikić studio, introductory study written by Božidar Zečević; monograph prepared by Rastko Ćirić, Miroslav Lj. Jelić, Milan Novaković, Filmski centar Srbije, Beograd, 2013
- Srpska avangarda i film 1920–1932. (Serbian avant-garde and film 1920–1932), Udruženje filmskih umetnika Srbije, 2013

=== Selected filmography ===
Including television works.

- 1972 Writer and director, General of Loch Fyne (General od Loh Fajna) („Dunav film“, Belgrade), documentary film, 15 mins. Official Selection of Belgrade Short Film Festival 1972.
- 1988 Writer and narrator, Srem Fellow from Hollywood (Sremac iz Holivuda) (Television Novi Sad), TV film, 45 mins.
- 1988 Writer and narrator, Herceg Novi in Your Hands (Herceg Novi na vašem dlanu) (Radio-television of Serbia), TV travelogue (four hours).
- 1989 Writer, director and narrator, Kosovo Battle in the Tradition and Culture of European Nations (Kosovski boj u kulturi i tradiciji evropskih nacija) two 40 minutes episodes, TV feature-documentary mini series (Radio-television of Serbia).
- 1990 Writer, director and narrator, An Ally with Camera (Saveznik sa kamerom, Союзник с камерой), documentary film, 45 mins (Radio-television of Serbia).
- 1990 Writer and narrator, Three Hundred Years Anniversary of the Great Migration of Serbs (Tristogodišnjica Velike seobe Srba), national program of seven hours live from Sremski Karlovci Celebration (Radio-television of Serbia).
- 1990 Co-writer and narrator, Political Clashes in Yugoslavia between the Wars (Politički sukobi u Jugoslaviji između dva rata), 7 one-hour episodes, TV documentary series (Radio-television of Serbia).
- 1990-1992 Co-writer and narrator, Yugoslavia in War 1941-1945 (Jugoslavija u ratu 1941-1945), 27 one-hour episodes, TV documentary series, Annual Prize of the Radio-television of Serbia „for the most successful TV project“, 1992 (Radio-television of Serbia).
- 1991 Author and narrator, A Discovery of Armenian Film (Otkriće jermenskog filma), one-hour TV documentary (Television Novi-Sad).
- 1991-1992 Writer and narrator, Alexandria, a Capital of Memories (Aleksandrija, prestonica sećanja), two one-hour episodes documentary TV series (Television Novi Sad) .
- 1992 Writer and narrator, The Copts: Dawn of Christianity, (Kopti: zora hrišćanstva), one-hour documentary (Television Novi Sad).
- 1993 Writer and narrator The Cradle of Europe - Blagotin, the city of good people (Kolevka Evrope – Blagotin, grad dobrih ljudi), three-one hour episodes, TV documentary series (Radio-television of Serbia).
- 1994 Narrator and director, Hundred and fifty years of the National Museum in Belgrade, (Sto pedeset godina Narodnog muzeja u Beogradu), one-hour TV documentary (Radio-television of Serbia).
- 1995 Writer, Little Prince on the Lake (Mali princ na jezeru), animated film (A2). Winner of the „Golden medal of Belgrade“ for Film Script, Belgrade Short Film Festival.
- 1995-2000 Author and host, Septima, Sunday afternoon live show on film (Television Politika). Awarded by NIP „Ekran“ fort best film program.
- 1998 Writer, British Gambite (Britanski gambit), one-hour telefilm, nominated for best play at the International TV Festival in Vrnjačka Banja 1998 (Radio-television of Serbia).
- 2003-2005 Writer and narrator, Century of Serbian Cinema (Vek srpskog filma), nine half-hour documentary TV series (Radio-television of Serbia).
- 2004 Writer, Belgrade Recalls, a story of the Belgrade Festival (Beograd pamti, istorija Beogradskog festivala dokumentarnog filma), one-hour documentary, Awarded Chart for Special Contribution, Belgrade Festival of Short and Documentary Films (Vitagraph, Belgrade Film Festival)
- 2006. Writer, In the Fire of Century, beginnings of the military film in Serbia (U požaru stoleća, počeci vojne kinematografije u Srbiji), one-hour documentary film (Vitagraph).
- 2006. Writer, director and narrator, A Discovery of the Soul – the truth of March 27th 1941 (Otkriće duše – istina o 27. martu 1941) one-hour documentary film, absolute record in number of spectators per single documentary show (2 000 000) on Pink television, ex-Yugoslavia. Special gratitude of H.R.H prince Alexander of Serbia and event on the Royal Court of Serbia. Special prize of the Jury at the "Golden Knight Film Festival" in Moscow („for the outstanding TV approach to the documentary matter and search for historical truth“, 2012).
