= Miloš Tenković =

Serbian painter

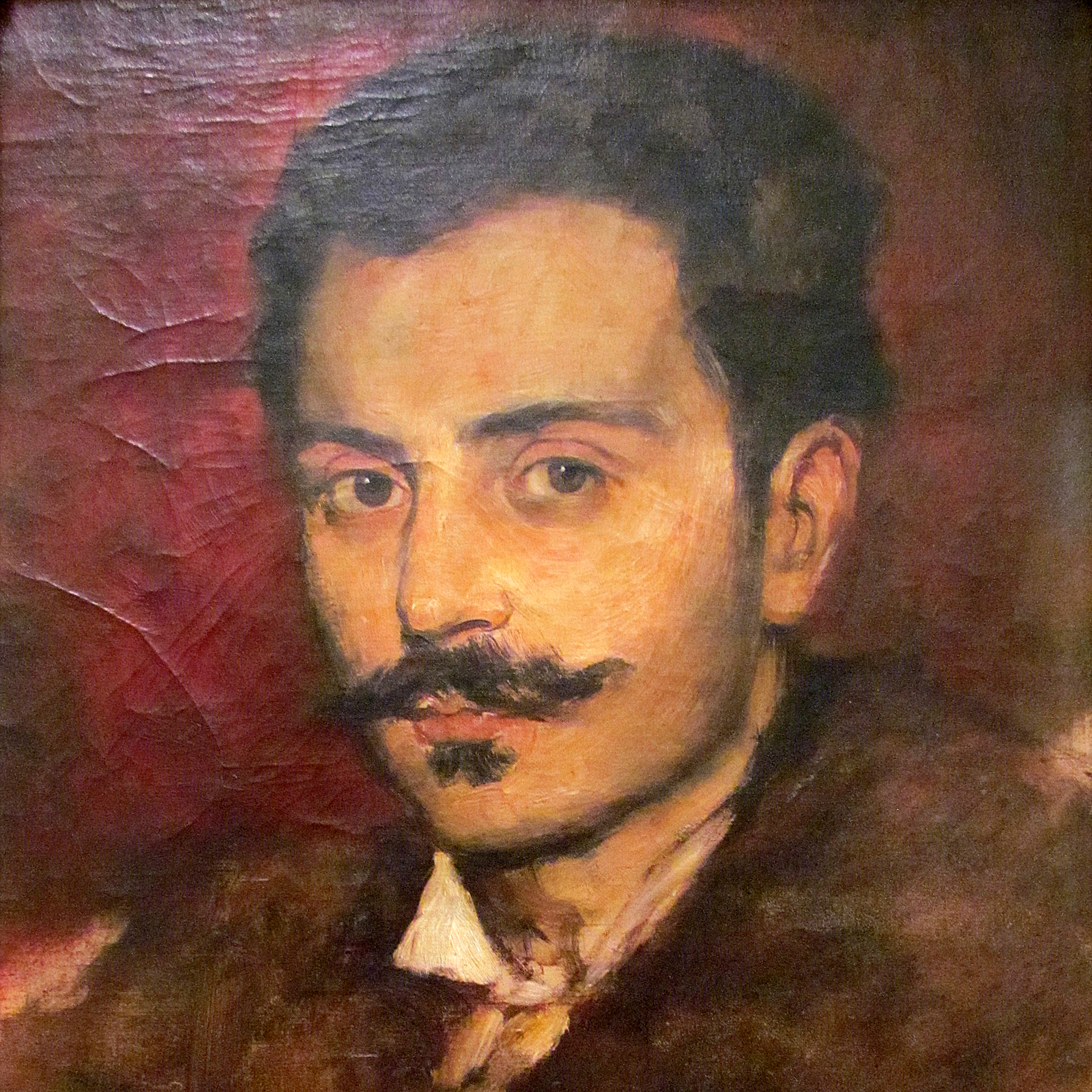
Miloš Tenković

Miloš Tenković (Cyrillic Serbian Милош Тенковић; Belgrade, Principality of Serbia, 8 April 1849 – Belgrade, Kingdom of Serbia, 16 January 1891) was a prominent Serbian painter. His style is characteristic of the realistic school of the period.

Among his works, we can note the Landscape with cows [archive], preserved in the National Museum in Belgrade. His work is also a part of the collection of Dom Jevrem Grujić. After 1870, he was part of a generation of painters educated in the Munich that heralded a new phase in Serbian art, one in which pure landscape was accepted as an independent art form. Influenced by a wide range of ideas from various European schools, still-life and village scenes now became a respectable subject matter. Among the three prominent artists from this time, all three alumni of the Academy of Fine Arts in Munich, were Miloš Tenković, Đorđe Krstić, Antonije Kovačević, and Djordje Milovanović (artist).

His best works are held in the National Museum in Belgrade, including "Florist" (1877),"Broken Majolica", "Self-portrait" (1875-1877), "Landscape with Cows" (1875-1877) and "Still Life (1878).

== Gallery ==
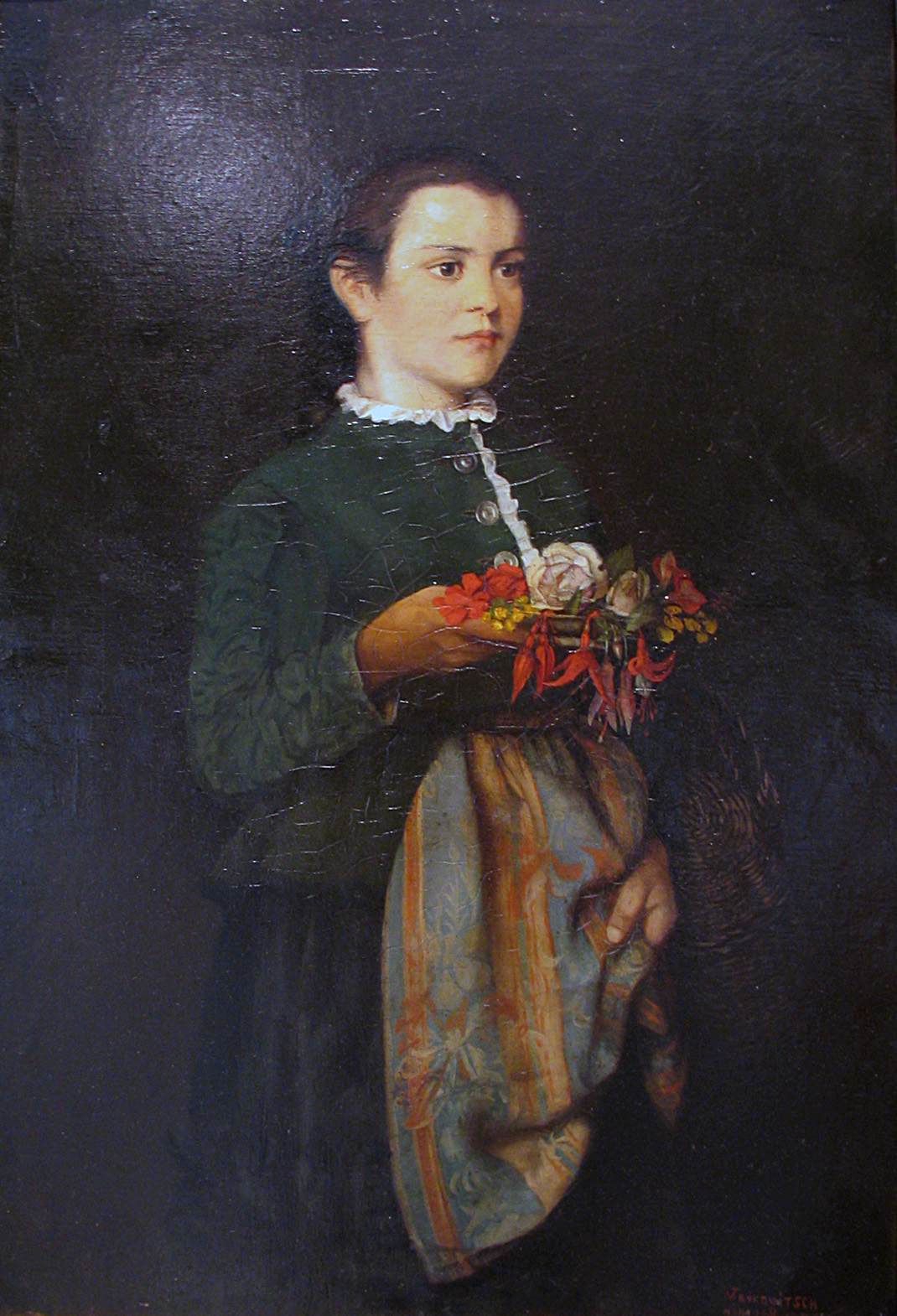
The florist, 1877

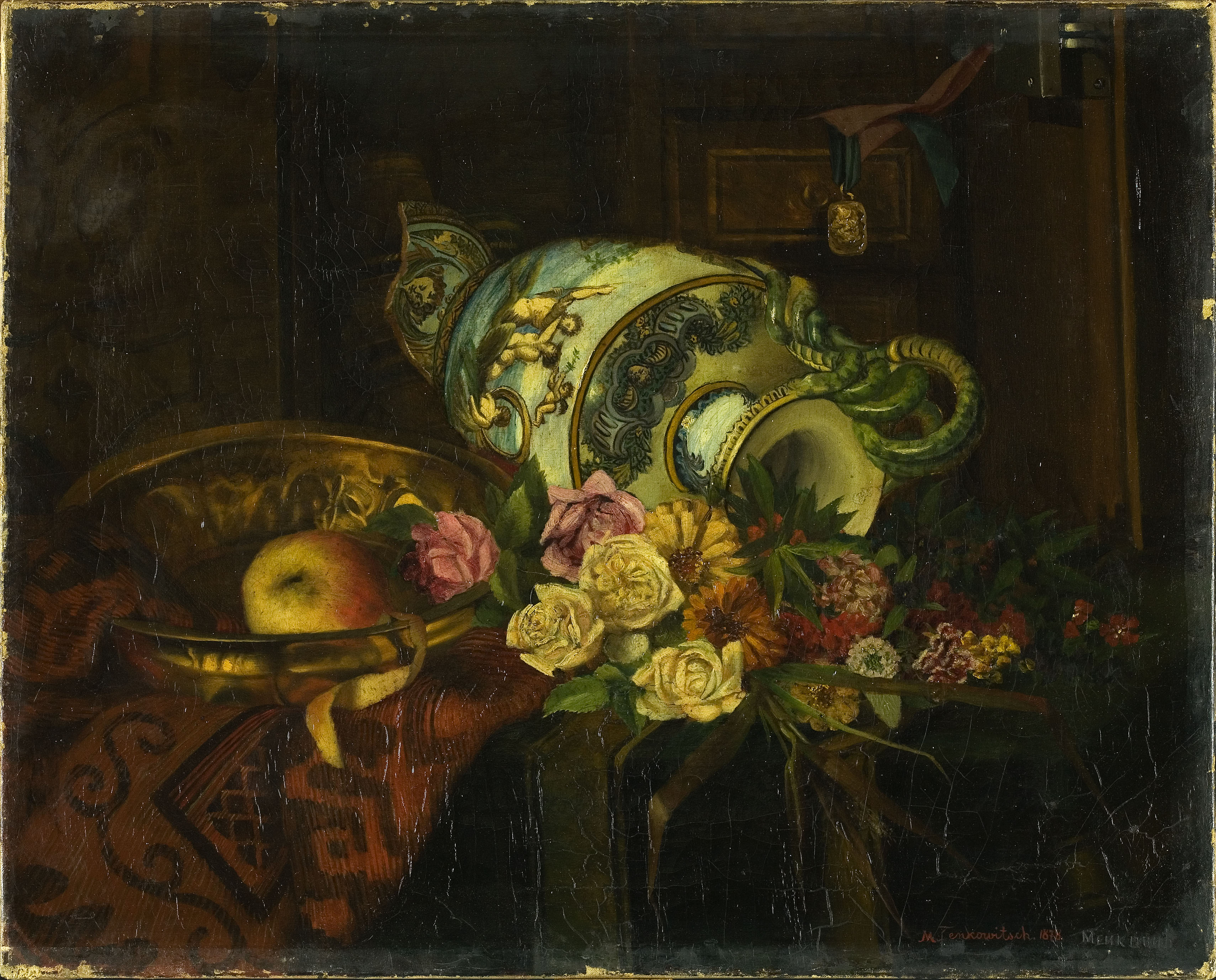
Still life, 1878

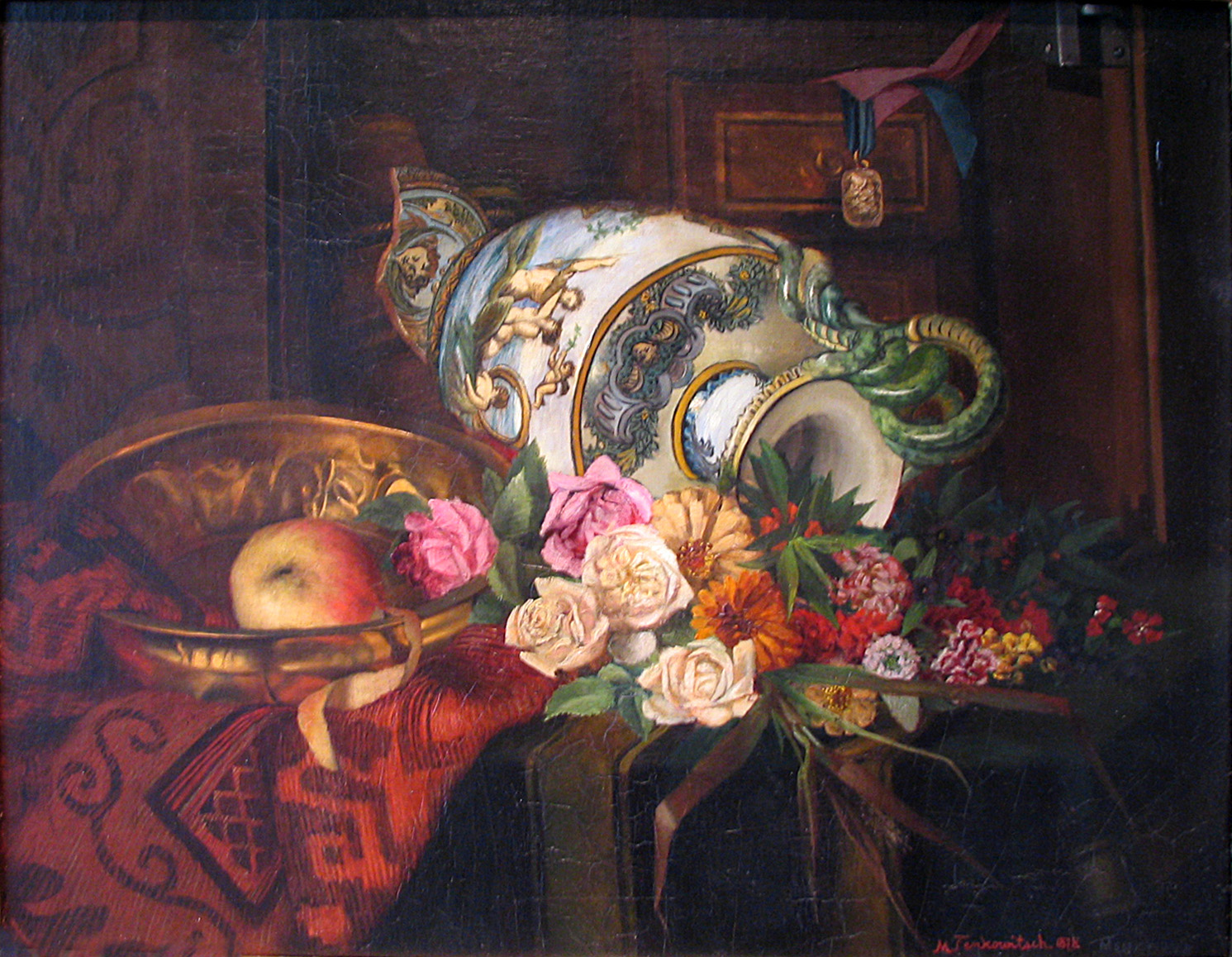
Still life, 1878

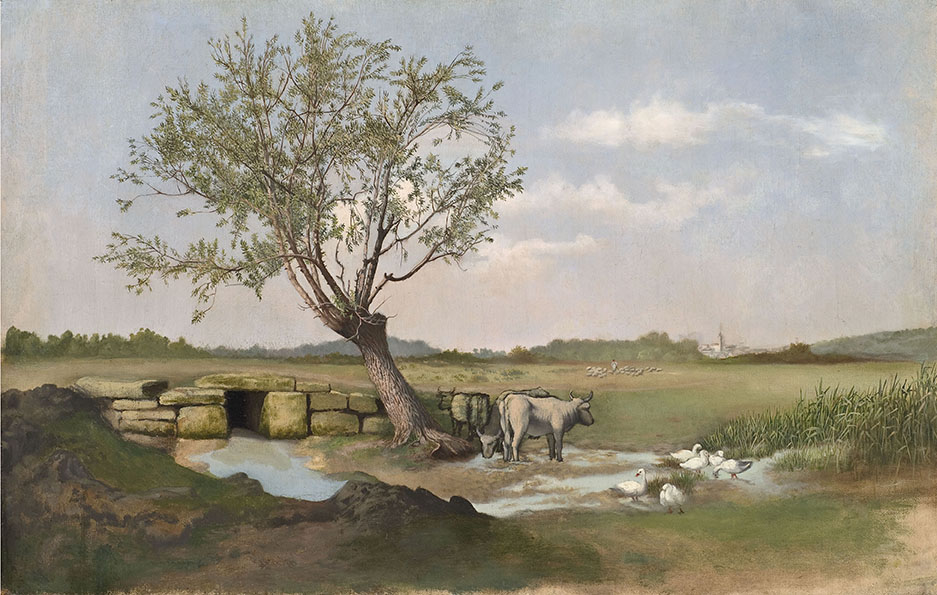
Landscape with cows, 1878

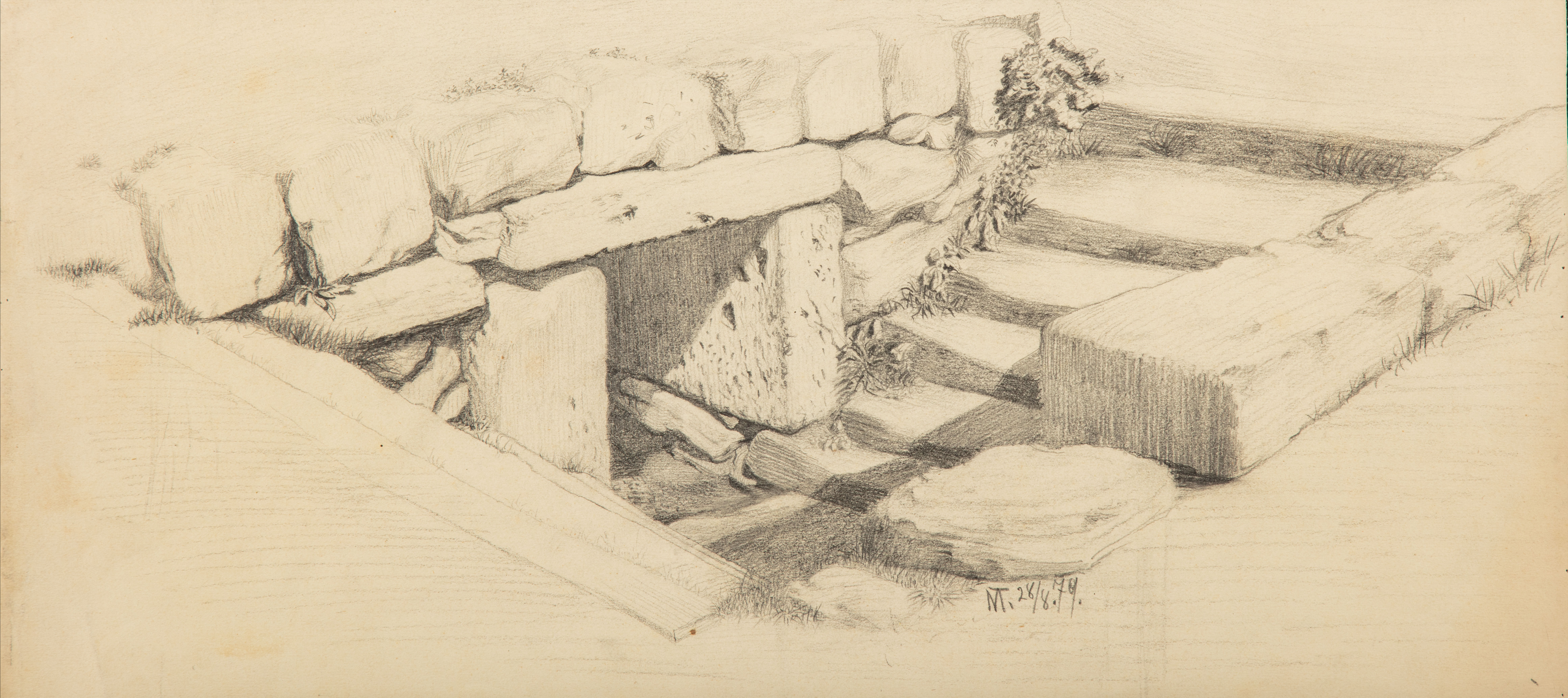
Stairs, 1879

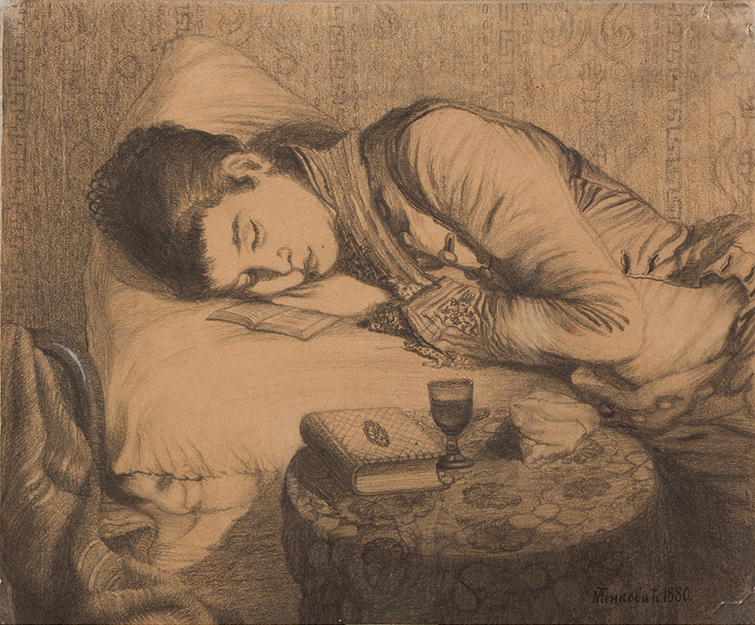
Sleeping woman, 1880
