= Antonije Kovačević =

Serbian painter and scenic designer

Antonije Kovačević (Serbian Cyrillic Антоније Ковачевић; Belgrade, Principality of Serbia, 12 February 1848 – Belgrade, Kingdom of Serbia, 22 July 1883) was a Serbian painter and scenic designer. Today his still-life paintings and icons are on display in the National Museum in Belgrade. He is best known, however, for many scenic designs for Đura Jakšić's plays.

Painters educated in the Academy of Fine Arts in Munich during the 1870s and after like Antonije Kovačević, Miloš Tenković, Djordje Milovanović (artist) and Đorđe Krstić brought fresh new ideas and showed new interests in the art world.

Antonije Kovačević is credited with incorporating the new stagecraft into the Serbian drama. His designs integrated the scenic elements into the storytelling instead of having them separate and indifferent from the play's action. Antonije's style was referred to as realism, a combination of bold use of colour and dramatic lighting. He is the author of many scenic designs during the heyday of the National Theatre in Belgrade in the 1870s. He also painted icons with his contemporary colleagues Steva Todorović and Nikola Marković.

== See also ==
- List of painters from Serbia
