= Arsenije Petrović =

Serbian painter

Arsenije Petrović (Serbian Cyrillic: Арсеније Петровић; Bela Crkva, Banat, 1803 – Zemun, Principality of Serbia, 1870) was a Serbian painter.

== Biography ==
Arsenije Petrović was born in 1803 in Serbian Banat and took up art at an early age, however, he was not academically trained, though he had some instruction from a local master painter in Vršac early on. Considered one of the most important Serbian traveling amateur painters of the 19th century, Petrović art is similar to the autochthonous, wild art of American tinsmiths and Folk artists, who share in their use of color and range of expression, spontaneity, skill, and simplicity in their work. His main themes are life and the objects that surround them. His children's portraits are often compared to New York painter John Bradley.

He did icon painting and portraits for a living. He painted in Ottoman Serbia in his early career and Habsburg Srem and Banat in his later years. He was especially appreciated as a portraitist of children.

Arsenije Petrović's work first appeared in the Serbia in 1839. His painting moves between primitive decorativeness and Biedermeier naturalism. Despite his naive art painting, he joined the Serbs of Austria-Hungary, who played a significant role in the creation of the modern state and the art culture of a young civil society. In 1842 his fame reached the prince's court, where he painted a portrait of little Peter Karadjordjević, the future king Peter I. That Arsenije gladly accepted to paint children and that he did so with joy and skill, can be seen from the works exhibited in the residence of Princess Ljubica: Girl with a basket of flowers and Boy with a dove; as well as on the canvas: Portrait of little Petar Radović, from the National Museum in Niš.

Arsenije Petrović died in Zemun, then part of Austria-Hungary, in 1870.

== Gallery ==
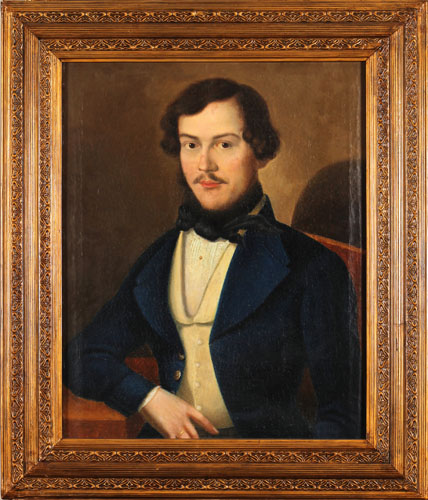
Portrait of a young man 1830.

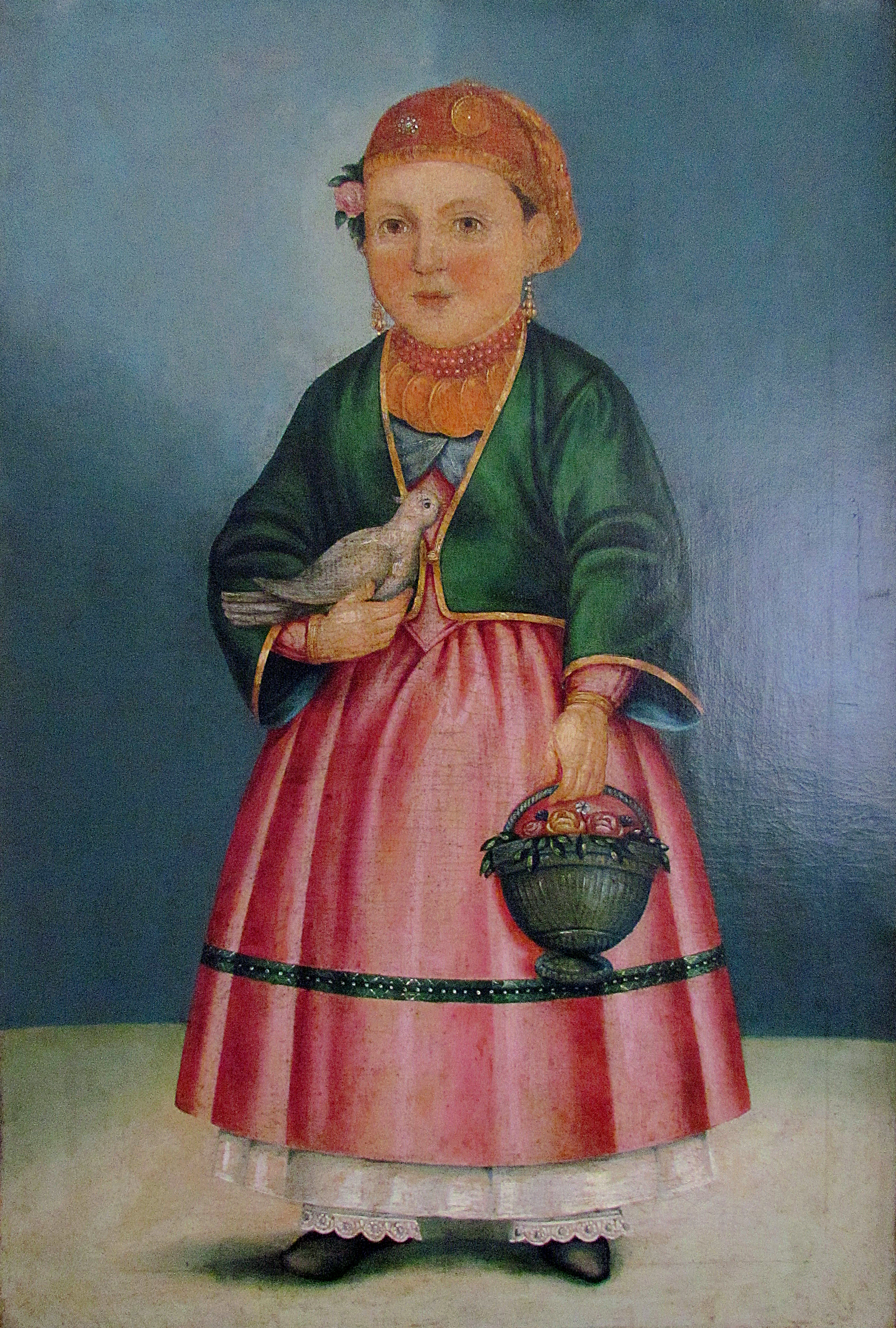
Girl with a flower basket, 1845–50.

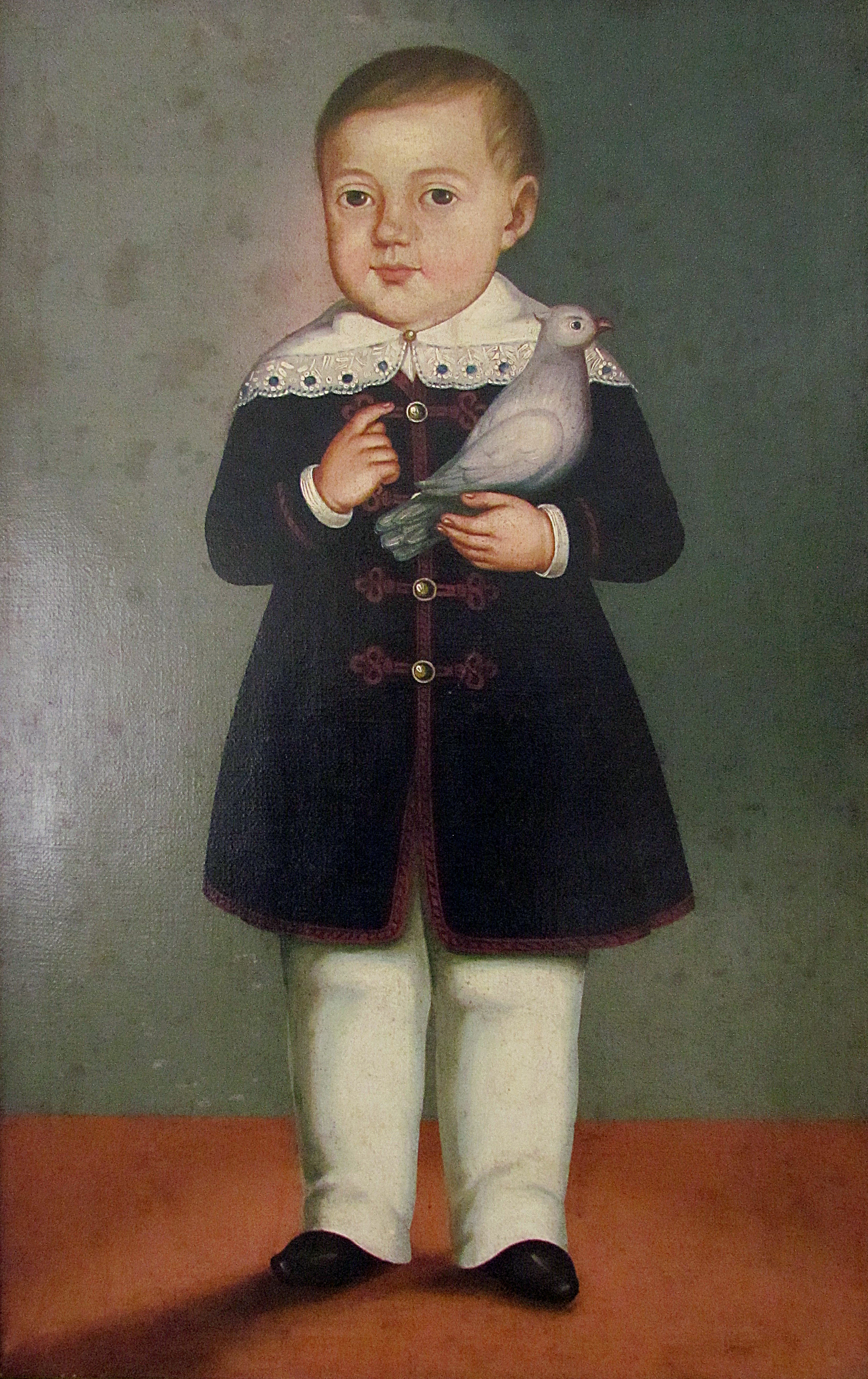
Boy with a pigeon, 1852.

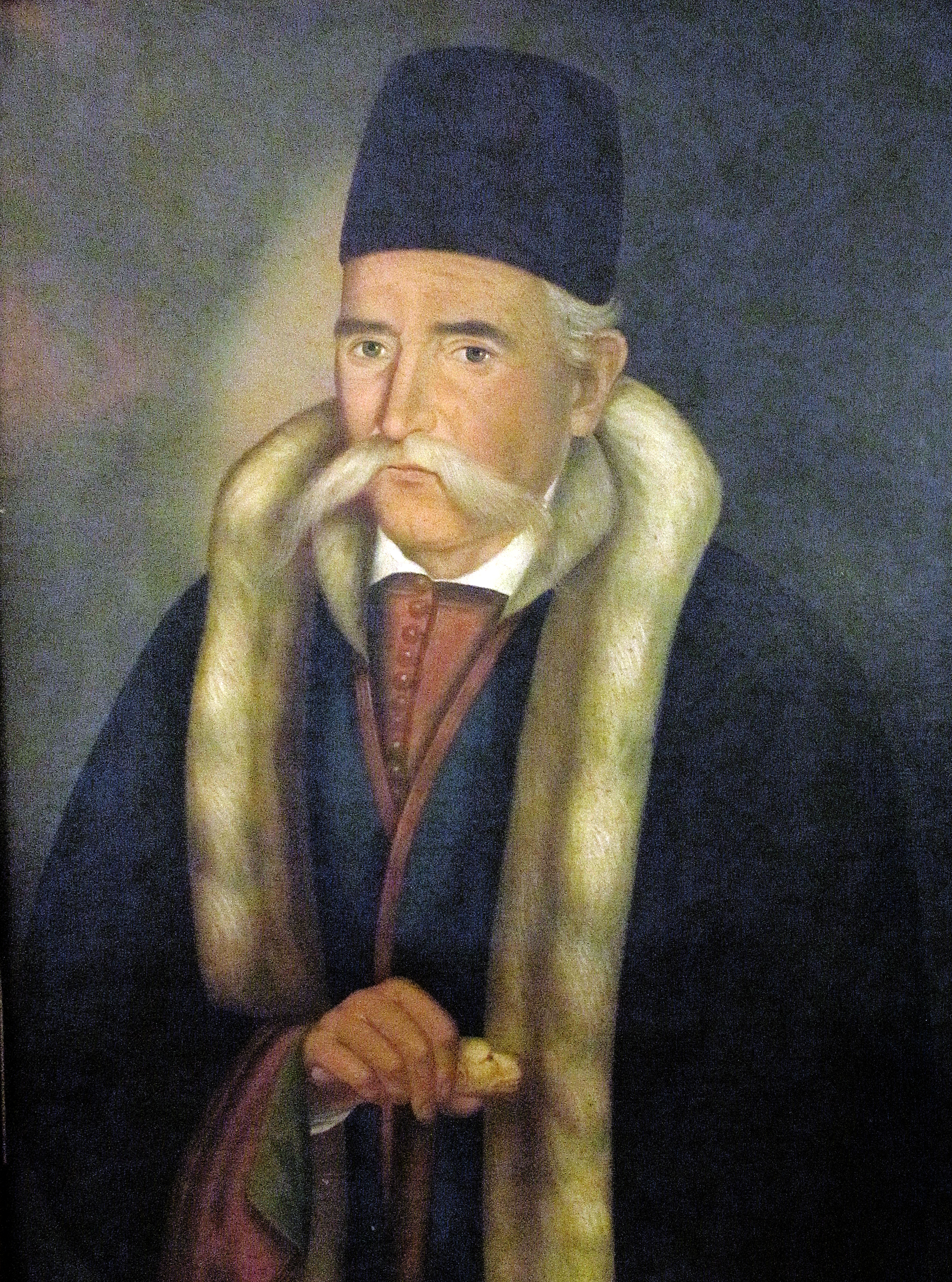
George Toska, 1854–6.

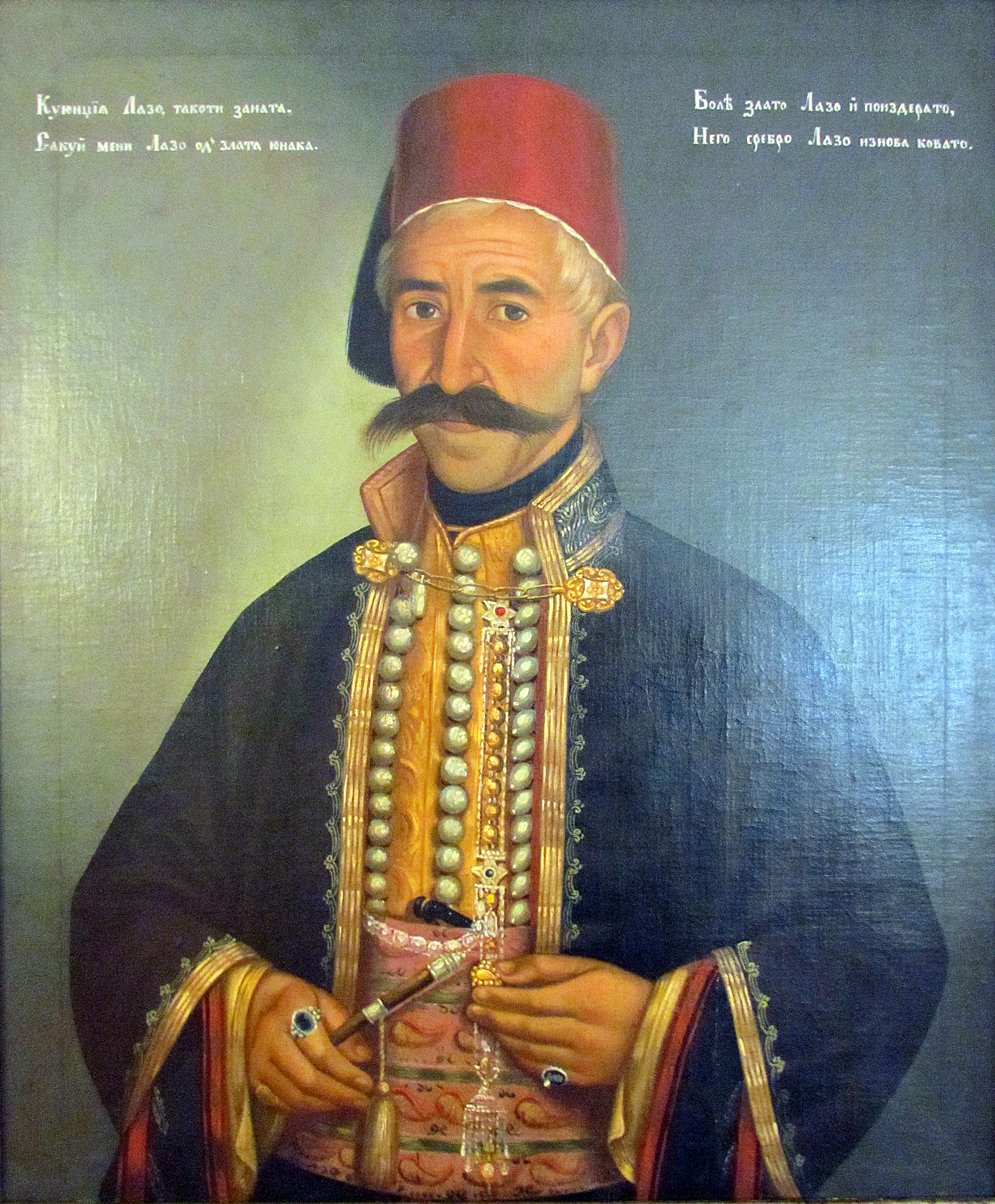
Laza Petrović, 1854–6.

== See also ==
- Serbian art
- List of Serbian painters
