= Green Party (Serbia) =

Defunct political party in Serbia

Green Party Зелена странка Zelena stranka
- Abbreviation: ZES
- President: Goran Čabradi
- Secretary-General: Nataša Pjevac
- Founded: 2014
- Dissolved: 26 June 2021
- Merged into: Savez 90/Zeleni Srbije
- Headquarters: Novi Sad
- Ideology: Green politics; Slovak minority interests
- International affiliation: World Ecological Parties
- National Assembly (2016–2020): 1 / 250

The Green Party (Serbian: Зелена странка, romanized: Zelena stranka, ZES) was a green political party in Serbia, based in Novi Sad and led by Goran Čabradi. Registered as a party of the Slovak national minority, it won one seat in the National Assembly in 2016. In 2021, it joined Savez 90/Zeleni Srbije (Alliance 90/Greens of Serbia), a party that opposition green groups accused of being a pro-government project designed to draw votes away from genuine green parties.

== History ==
=== 2014–2021 ===
The party was founded in 2014. In the 2016 parliamentary election, it ran as a national minority list, winning 0.63% of the vote and one seat, which went to Čabradi. It also won a seat in the Assembly of Vojvodina and seats in thirteen city and municipal assemblies. In the National Assembly, Čabradi initially sat in a joint parliamentary group with the League of Social Democrats of Vojvodina, which he later left.

In April 2019, Čabradi left an informal green parliamentary group after its members did not back the party's initiative to protect drinking water in the Constitution. Later that month, Aleksandra Čabraja, an independent MP elected on the list of Enough is Enough, joined the party, becoming its second MP.

In the 2020 parliamentary election, it ran on a joint list with the New Party, "Let the Masks Fall – Green Party – New Party" (Nek maske padnu – Zelena stranka – Nova stranka), which failed to cross the electoral threshold.

=== Merger into Savez 90/Zeleni Srbije ===
In June 2021, the party joined Savez 90/Zeleni Srbije, a new party led by Đura Vlaškalić, in which Čabradi became a senior figure alongside vice-president Nenad Milić, a former deputy interior minister. Savez 90 denied claims that it was a government project.

Savez 90 emerged ahead of the 2022 elections, amid growing environmental protests against lithium mining. According to an investigation by BIRN, it was created by re-registering the existing Conservative Party, which allowed it to avoid collecting the 10,000 signatures normally required to register a new party. Do not let Belgrade drown, part of the green-left We Must coalition, described Savez 90 as a "fake organisation" activated to harm the green-left coalition, divert votes from genuine green options, and help the Serbian Progressive Party stay in power. It also said that the party's name and sunflower logo were "literally and completely copied" from the German Alliance 90/The Greens. Milić defended the logo, saying that a sunflower on a green background is a symbol of green parties across Europe.

== Presidents ==
#	President	Born–Died	Term start	Term end
1	Goran Čabradi	1968–	2014	2021

== Electoral performance ==
=== Parliamentary elections ===
National Assembly
Year	Leader	Popular vote	% of popular vote	# of seats	Seat change	Coalition	Status
2016	Goran Čabradi	23,890	0.63%	1 / 250	▲1	–	Opposition
2020	Goran Čabradi	7,805	0.24%	0 / 250	▼1	Nova	Extra-parliamentary
