= Goran Čabradi =

Serbian politician (born 1968)

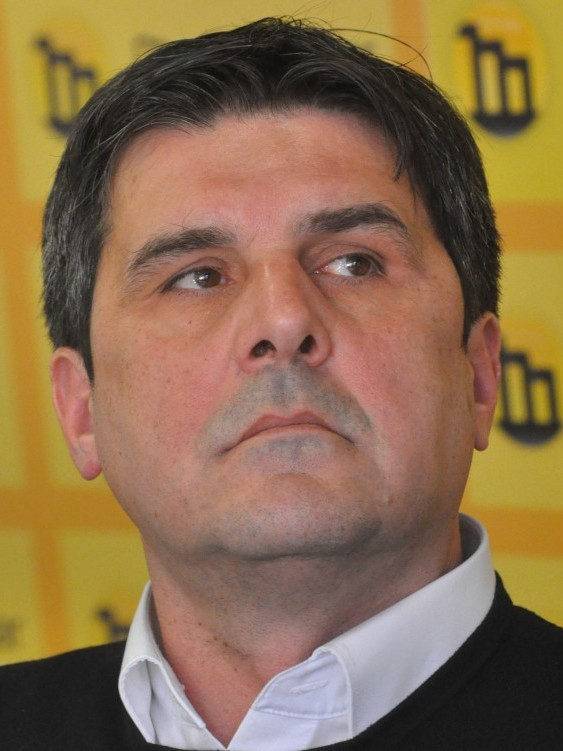
- Čabradi in 2019

Personal details
- Born: 1968 (age 57–58) Novi Sad, SFR Yugoslavia
- Party: Greens of Serbia (−2015); Green Party (2015–2021); Savez 90/Zelenih Srbije (2021–present)
- Education: University of Novi Sad Faculty of Technical Sciences
- Occupation: Politician

Goran Čabradi (Serbian Cyrillic: Горан Чабради; born 1968) is a politician in Serbia. He has served in the National Assembly of Serbia since 2016 as the leader and sole parliamentary representative of the Green Party.

== Early life and career ==
Čabradi was born in Novi Sad in the province of Vojvodina, then part of the Socialist Republic of Serbia in the Socialist Federal Republic of Yugoslavia. He has a master's degree in environmental protection and has worked in municipal waste management.

Čabradi was a member of the Greens of Serbia before forming the breakaway Green Party. He registered his party as a Slovak minority party, although he acknowledged in a 2016 interview with Politika that he did so only because it would have been financially unfeasible to register the party as a non-minority group. He added that he hoped to re-register the party in the near future.

== Parliamentary career ==
Čabradi led the Green Party's electoral list in the 2016 Serbian parliamentary election, in which the party ran in an alliance with Jan Paul's Slovak Party and other smaller groups. The party received 23,890 votes (0.63%), well below the five per cent electoral threshold normally required for representation in the assembly. As the list was recognized as representing the country's Slovak minority, however, the threshold requirement was waived, the party was awarded one seat, and Čabradi was duly declared elected.

In September 2016, a group of dissident Green Party members sought to remove Čabradi as party president. The rebels, led by Slavica Vasilijević, charged that Čabradi was governing the party in an arbitrary fashion and particularly opposed his decision to support a resolution on the Srebrenica massacre that, in their view, described the Serbian people as genocidal. The Slovak Party, which also opposed the Srebrenica resolution, urged Čabradi to resign his mandate. Online sources do not indicate exactly how this situation was resolved, though it seems to have resulted in a party split. By March 2017, the Green Party's website continued to list Čabradi as president, while the website for a rival group called the "Green Party of Serbia" listed Vasilijević as president.

Following his election to the assembly, Čabradi originally served in a parliamentary group with Nenad Čanak's League of Social Democrats of Vojvodina. He left the group in February 2017, ironically after Čedomir Jovanović of the Liberal Democratic Party had agreed to join it to ensure it would not lose its official status in the assembly. Since then, Čabradi has not been aligned with any parliamentary group.

In June 2017, Čabradi introduced a bill to legalize medicinal marijuana in Serbia. Although he is not formally aligned with Serbia's coalition government, he voted in favour of Serbian president Aleksandar Vučić's nomination of Ana Brnabić for prime minister later in the same month after the government agreed to establish a ministry of environmental protection.

Early in his mandate, Čabradi was a member of the parliamentary environmental protection committee and the committee on the rights of the child, and a deputy member of the agriculture, forestry, and water management committee. He is a member of the parliamentary friendship groups for Austria, Germany, Spain, and Sweden.
