= Happy Brothers =

Painting by Uroš Predić

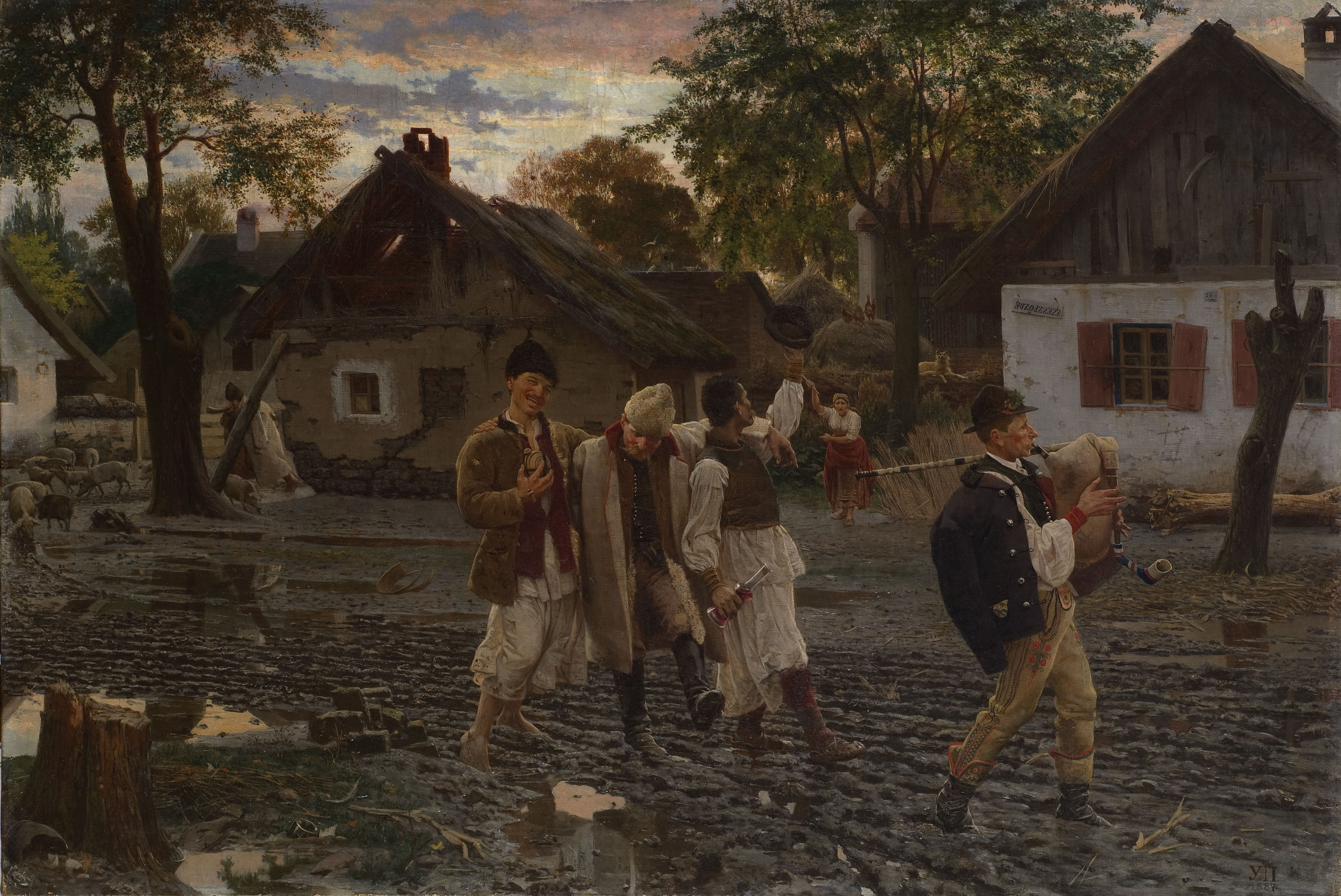
Uroš Predić, Happy Brothers, 1887, oil on canvas, 82 by 122 centimetres (32 by 48 in), National Museum of Serbia

Happy Brothers, Their Poor Mother! (Note: Serbian: Vesela braća, žalosna im majka!, Serbian Cyrillic: Весела браћа, жалосна им мајка!) (often referred to simply as Happy Brothers) (Note: Serbian: Vesela braća, Serbian Cyrillic: Весела браћа) is an 1887 oil painting by the Serbian artist Uroš Predić. It shows four intoxicated youths walking through their village whilst the mother of one shouts her disapproval from the distance. The painting is said to have been inspired by a frequent sight in Predić's home village of Orlovat—that of drunken youths returning from the pub at dawn. Predić painted the composition hoping it would persuade the villagers to change their ways. He was disappointed that it not only failed to decrease the incidence of drunkenness in Orlovat, but was well received by the villagers themselves, who were happy merely to have been depicted.

One art historian suggests the painting was influenced by the works of Rosa Bonheur and Gustave Courbet, while another believes it was informed by those of the satirists William Hogarth and Honoré Daumier. The painting's humorous content contributed to its popularity among critics, collectors and the public at large, which led to Predić painting two replicas in 1918 and 1922. By 1890, the original was owned by the National Museum of Serbia, in whose possession it remains.

== Background ==
Uroš Predić (1857–1953) was one of the most successful 19th- and 20th-century Serbian realists. A native of Orlovat, a village in the Banat region of Austria-Hungary, Predić drew scenes of life in the village throughout his career. One of the more frequent sights during his stays there was of intoxicated young men returning from the pub at dawn and waking up the whole village. In painting the composition, Predić was not only attempting to realistically depict contemporary village life but also to convey a message. "I observed this every day", he explained. "I said to myself there must be some way of telling these people to what an unhappy level they have descended and have a moral impact on them, capturing all the bad habits of my compatriots." Predić had expressed disapproval of the villagers' behavior in an earlier work, Clients in Front of a Lawyer's Door (1886).

== Painting ==
=== Description ===
Happy Brothers, Their Poor Mother!, often referred to simply as Happy Brothers, is an oil painting that measures 82 by 122 centimetres (32 by 48 in). "It is a glimpse into village life in early fall", Predić explained. "The harvest has been gathered and the pigs slaughtered. The fires have been lit, the spits turned, the drinks dispensed and the celebrations fully under way. The air is filled with the aroma of ... cooking meat ... and the sounds of music and drunken song that disturb the village's peace."

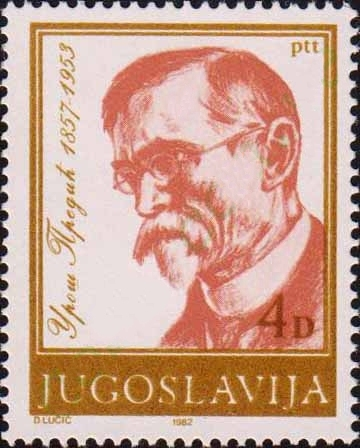
Predić's self-portrait on a 1982 Yugoslav postage stamp

According to Predić, the painting shows four intoxicated youths who have been drinking all night walking rowdily through their village around dawn and waking all their neighbours. They trudge down the middle of the dirt road, keeping their distance from the surrounding houses so as to avoid crashing against a wall and hurting themselves. The gajda (bagpipe) player, the most sober of the four, walks slightly ahead of his friends. The one to the left, the youngest of the group, walks barefoot through the mud and props one of his friends up against his shoulder. The man he is propping up, who is the most intoxicated, paid for the previous night's drinks and bounces between shoulders for support. The man to his right has just realized that he is walking by his own dilapidated home. His mother, alerted by the young men's laughter and song, emerges from the house and recognizes her son. (Note: Filipovitch-Robinson writes that the woman is the mother of all four.) She begins to shout at him and threatens to spank him once he returns, but the young man simply laughs and sends her an acknowledging wave with his hat. A young girl peaks out the bottom pane of the left window of the house to the far right, wondering if her boyfriend is part of the group. A sign above her reads Szeszfőzde ("distillery" in Hungarian). Predić's initials in Cyrillic, У.П., can be found in the bottom-right corner.

In his notes, Predić identified the individuals depicted in the painting as "Maks" (the gajda player), Nikola Bojić (the man waving his hat) and Nikola Madžarov (the man bobbing between friends). Predić described the person to Madžarov's right as simply "a young man from Orlovat".

=== Analysis ===
The art historian Lilien Filipovitch-Robinson posits that the painting is informed by the progressive style of French realists such as Rosa Bonheur and Gustave Courbet. She concedes that there is no documentary evidence to suggest Predić was influenced by Courbet's depictions of peasant life, but notes that the latter's work was in the public domain at the time Happy Brothers was created and was quite popular throughout Europe. Filipovitch-Robinson believes that Predić rejected the precision and linearism of both Academic and Biedermeier art, and, as Courbet would have done, used heavily textured brushstrokes to define the roughness of the muddy road. She also draws parallels between the painting and Courbet's Peasants of Flagey, which was shown at the Paris Salon of 1850 alongside The Stone Breakers and A Burial At Ornans.

The art historian Dejan Medaković once suggested that Predić was imitating the style of satirists William Hogarth and Honoré Daumier. Filipovitch-Robinson writes that if this were so, Predić's attempt at emulation was almost certainly unsuccessful. "Perhaps this was due to the inherent limitations of his subject", she writes, "the fact that the figures are not caricatured and that the painting is devoid of biting or mocking humor". According to Filipovitch-Robinson, Predić's treatment of Balkan rural life differs in a number of ways from that of his contemporary Paja Jovanović, who was known for painting similar subjects. Jovanović's paintings were based on careful ethnographic studies of rural costumes and everyday objects, whereas Predić's works lack Jovanović's precision, owing to the artist's tendency not to produce detailed studies of his subjects beforehand. "The images", Filipovitch-Robinson writes, "are more gestural because of the combination of generous brush strokes and minimal linear definition. This painting also brings Predić much closer to the more daring experimentations of the Munich School not only because of the textural play of the mud-laden soil against rough peasant garb but in his convincing presentation of the atmosphere of the quiet predawn hours."

== Reception and legacy ==
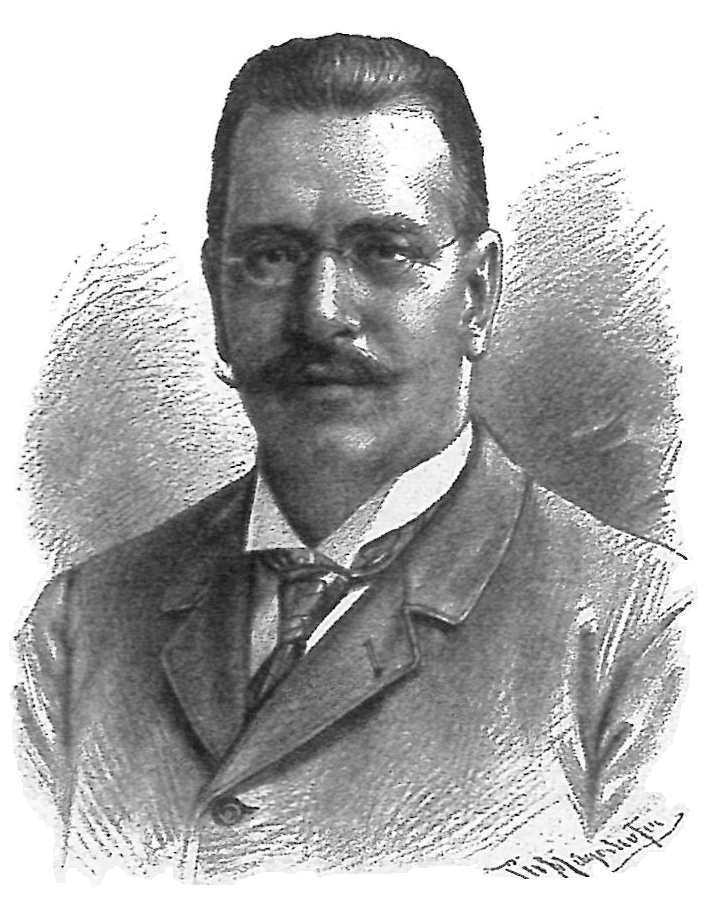
Critic Milan Rešetar considered the painting one of Predić's best works

Upon seeing reproductions of the painting, the villagers did not interpret it as a call to change their ways. Instead, they were flattered by Predić's decision to depict them. "To local audiences in particular", Filipovitch-Robinson writes, "such lighthearted didacticism entwined with a familiar and beloved world was immensely satisfying". It is said that on one of his visits home, Predić went to the local pub and encountered the patrons examining a calendar with a reproduction of his painting inside it. A number of patrons—some of whom were included in the composition—tapped him on the shoulder in drunken stupor and commended him on how accurately he had captured them. What Filipovitch-Robinson calls Predić's "well-meaning and subtle moralizing" had thus been rendered ineffectual.

Writing for the Novi Sad-based publication Javor in 1890, the critic Milan Rešetar ranked the painting among Predić's finest works up to that point. The Croatian magazine Vienac offered a positive review of the work, saying it offered a sad look at conditions in the Banat. The magazine praised Predić as "a true artist ... one who isn't afraid to use his talent to educate people and nurture the nobler aspects of human nature". Critics were satisfied with Happy Brothers because it not only offered an instructive narrative but also demonstrated the artist's technical abilities. Such vignettes of village life contributed greatly to Predić's popularity among collectors from the emerging Serbian middle class. Reproductions of the painting met with commercial success, further contributing to its popularity. This led Predić to paint two replicas, one in 1918 and the other in 1922. By 1890, the original was owned by the National Museum of Serbia, in whose possession it remains.

== See also ==
- Vršac triptych – Another painting of everyday life in Banat
