= Đorđe Krstić =

Serbian artist (1851–1907)

Đorđe Krstić Ђорђе Крстић
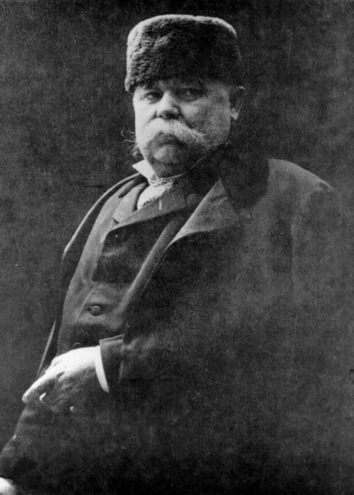
- Born: 19 April 1851; Kanjiža, Voivodeship of Serbia and Banat of Temeschwar, Austrian Empire
- Died: 30 October 1907 (aged 56); Belgrade, Kingdom of Serbia
- Education: Academy of Fine Arts, Munich
- Known for: Painting
- Notable work: Anatom (1880); Pod Jabukom (1883)
- Movement: Realism

Đorđe Krstić (Serbian Cyrillic: Ђорђе Крстић, pronounced [d͡ʑɔ̂ːrd͡ʑɛ kř̩ːstit͡ɕ]; 19 April 1851 – 30 October 1907) was a Serbian realist painter and academic. He is often ranked alongside his contemporaries, Paja Jovanović and Uroš Predić.

== Biography ==
Krstić received a national scholarship, which enabled him to complete his education in Munich in 1883. He remained in Germany for a decade and created some of his most important works there, influenced by Symbolist painters.

Some significant works of this early period include The Drowning Maiden, Anatomist, and The Gospel Writer. In Serbia, Krstić moved his style of painting from a realist tone to a more idyllic one, with paintings such as Kosovo Field Landscape, From the Surroundings of Čačak, From Leskovac, Studenica, and Žiča. Krstić painted more than 50 works based on Serbian folk art and traditional clothing.

As an artist, he drew inspiration from Serbian traditional clothing, history, literature and especially poetry.

In his later years, Krstić began painting a number of iconostases in Čurug and Niš, working with architect Mihailo Valtrović, of which include the controversial Death of Prince Lazar.

== Legacy ==
He is included in The 100 most prominent Serbs list.

== Gallery ==
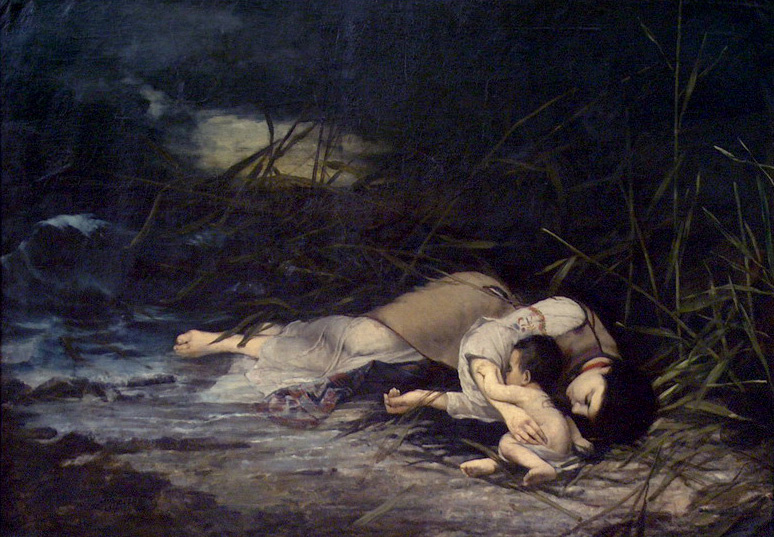
Drowned, 1879

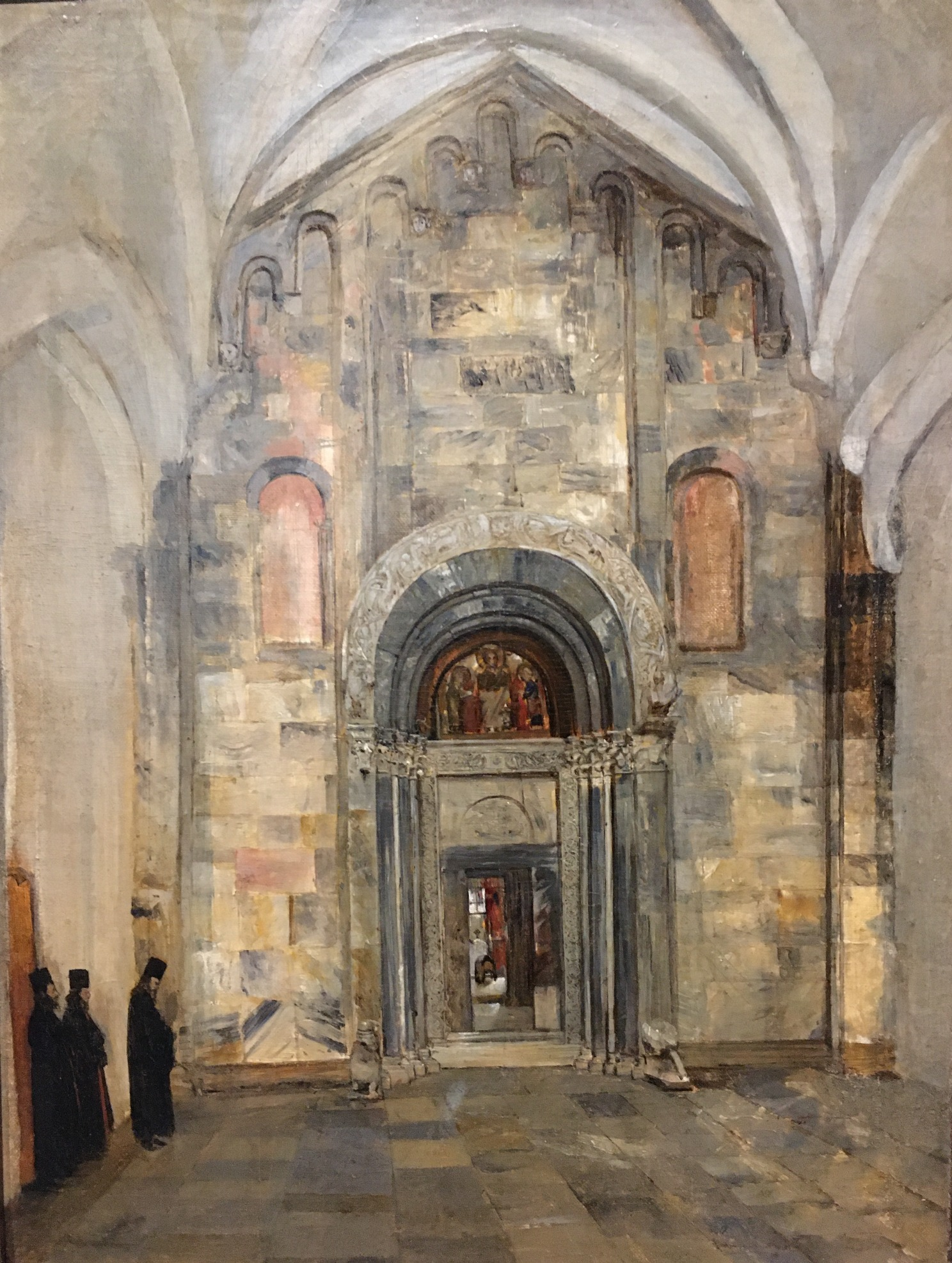
Studenica monastery, 1881–1883

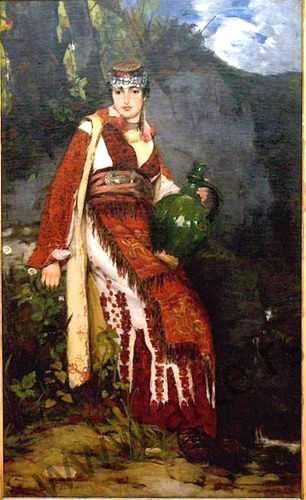
Na izvoru, 1882

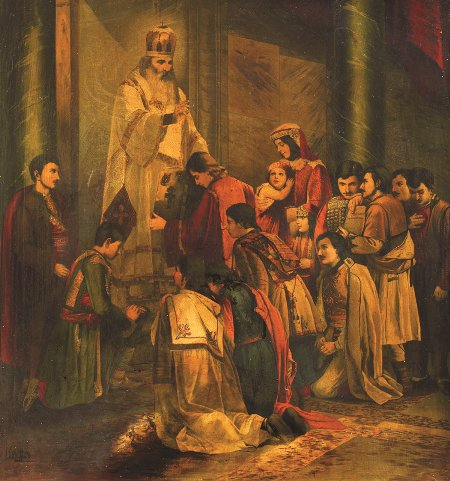
Saint Sava blessing young Serbs, 1891

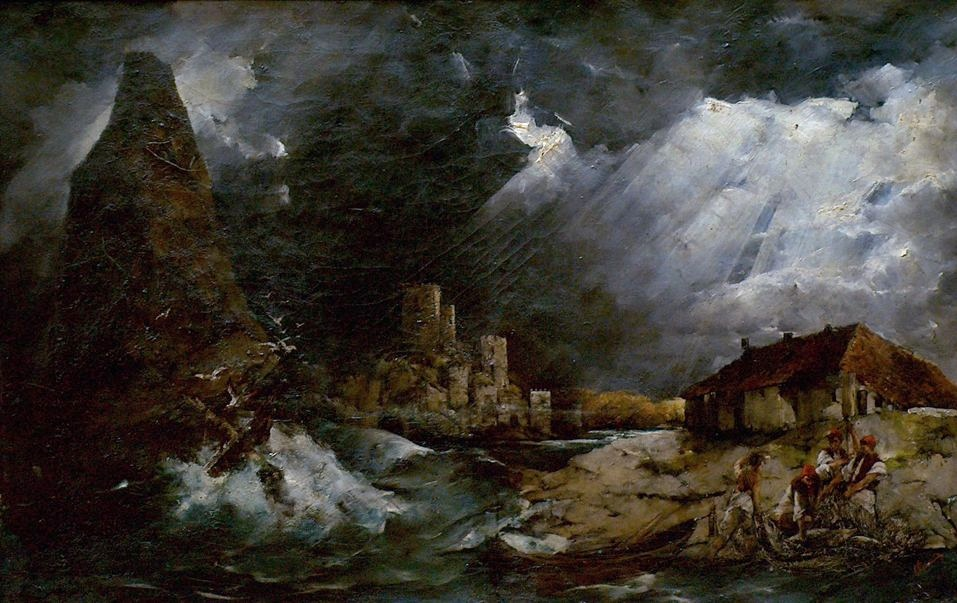
Babakai, 1892

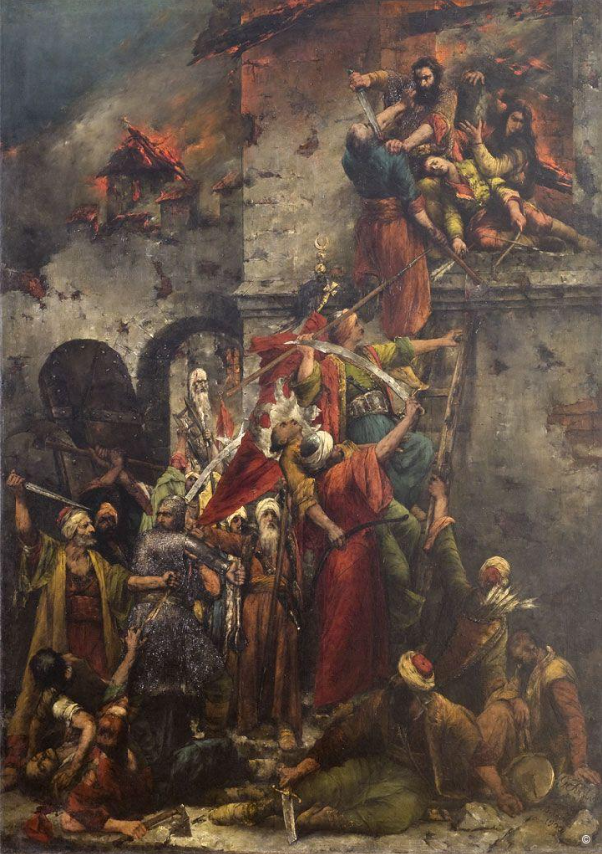
Fall of Stalać, 1900

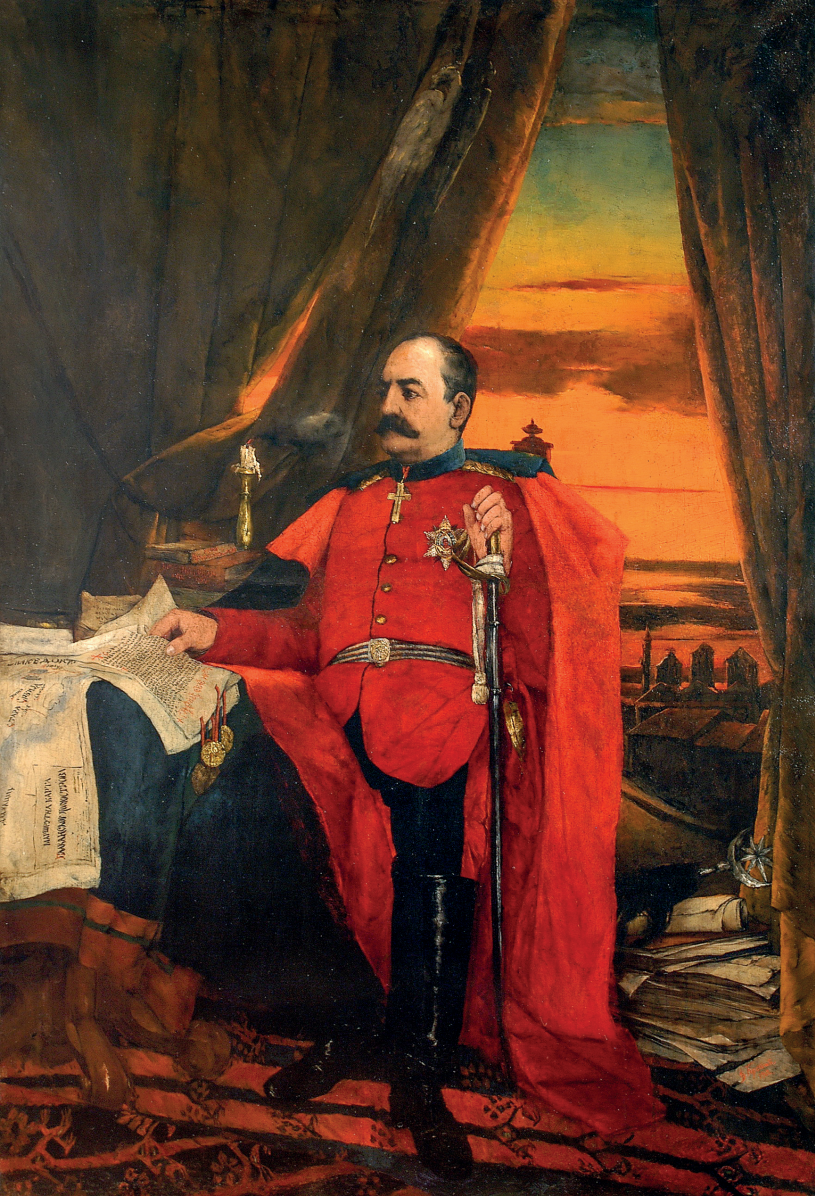
Milan I of Serbia, 1902

== See also ==
- List of painters from Serbia
- Serbian art
