= Uroš Predić =

Serbian artist (1857–1953)

Uroš Predić Урош Предић
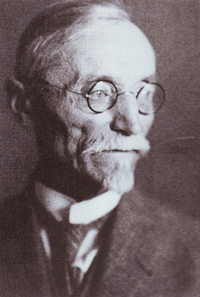
- Born: 7 December 1857; Orlovat, Austrian Empire
- Died: 2 December 1953 (aged 95); Belgrade, FPR Yugoslavia
- Known for: Painting
- Notable work: "Biće belaja" ("Going to be trouble") (1886, 1899) "Vesela Braća" ("Happy Brothers") (1887) "Siroče na majčinom grobu" ("Orphan on mother's grave") (1888) "Hercegovački begunci" ("Refugees from the Herzegovina Uprising") (1889) "Uzbrkano more" ("The turbulent sea") (1910) "Kosovska Devojka" ("Kosovo Maiden") (1919) "Sveti Sava blagosilja Srpčad" ("Saint Sava blesses Serb youth") (1921) "Povelja Kola Srpkih Sestara" ("Circle of Serbian Sisters Charter") (1922); Numerous portraits
- Movement: Realism

Uroš Predić (Serbian Cyrillic: Урош Предић, pronounced [ûrɔʃ prɛ̌ːdit͡ɕ]; 7 December 1857 – 12 February 1953) was a Serbian Realist painter. Along with Paja Jovanović and Đorđe Krstić, he is considered the most important Serbian painter of realism. Predić is best remembered for his early works, in which he depicted the "real" life of ordinary people. Later, he made a great contribution in church painting and portraits. Predić's opus includes a total of 1658 works.

== Biography ==
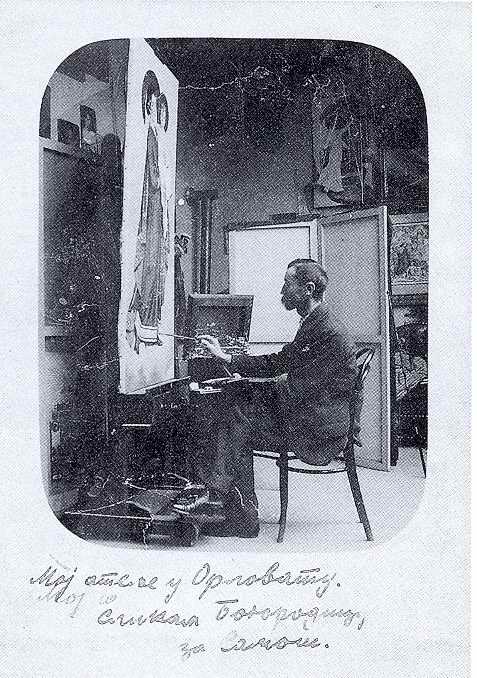
Uroš Predić in his studio, 1924

He was born in Orlovat, and attended primary school in Crepaja. After finishing his secondary education in Pančevo (this school was later named after him), he went to Vienna to study at the academy in 1876. He graduated from the Academy of Fine Arts of Vienna in 1880. He studied in the class of professor Christian Griepenkerl, who also taught Predić's contemporary Paja Jovanović. During his studies, he received the Gundel-Prize, for a male model painting in oil. In 1882, he worked in private studio of professor Grieppenkerl, and in the period from 1883 to 1885 he was an assistant professor of the Department of Antiquity at the Art academy in Vienna. During that time, under the instruction of professor Grieppenkerl, and the architect Theophil Freiherr von Hansen, he painted 13 wall paintings of ancient, historical and mythological compositions for the frieze in the House of Lords at the Reichsratsgebäude (Imperial Council Building) in Vienna.

In 1885, he returned to Orlovat, where he painted a series of paintings about the life of his fellow villagers. After that, from 1886 to 1889, he lived in Belgrade, and from 1890 to 1893 in Novi Sad and Stari Bečej. From 1894 to 1909, Predić lived in Orlovat, and from 1909, until his death, he lived and worked in Belgrade. The first exhibition of his paintings was in 1888 in Belgrade. He was elected to the group of painters who represented Serbia at the 1889 Exposition Universelle in Paris. In a small gallery he presented the 8 oil paintings. Although the French critics did not recognize his work Predić will become very popular in Serbia, especially because of the sense of humor shown in some works. He had many exhibitions, both in Serbia and aboard. Later his output was mainly portraits and church painting.

He was one of the founders of the Lada society in 1904 (alongside Beta Vukanović, Marko Murat, Đorđe Jovanović, Simeon Roksandić), and became its president. He was elected as associate member of the Serbian Royal Academy on 26 January 1909, and on 3 February 1910 as a regular member. Predić exhibited his artworks as a part of Kingdom of Serbia's pavilion at International Exhibition of Art of 1911. He was one of the founders of the Society of painters in Belgrade in 1919, and was its first president. Predić painted the icons for the Bečej orthodox church, and the icons for the chapel of Bogdan Dunđerski. He died in 1953 in Belgrade, at the age of 95. He was buried in Orlovat, according to his own wish.

== Works ==
Some of his famous works include Merry brothers, Orphan (on mother's grave), the historical painting Bosnia-Herzegovinian fugitives and perhaps his most recognizable Kosovo Maiden. Predić also painted the famous portraits of the presidents of Serbian academy: Sima Lozanić, Stojan Novaković (1920), Jovan Žujović (1921), Jovan Cvijić (1923), Slobodan Jovanović (1930), Bogdan Gavrilović (1935) Aleksandar Belić (1940). He also painted portraits of Michael I. Pupin, Laza Kostić, Mihailo Petrović Alas (1943), Ksenija Atanasijević (1917), Branislav Petronijević (1911) amongst others.

Several of Predić's drawings, sketches, and portraits were stolen and never recovered.

== Personal life ==
He was a friend of Paja Jovanović.

Uroš Predić's studio, where he painted his most valuable works in the period of 1909-1953, is located at 27 Svetogorska Street in Belgrade.

== Gallery ==
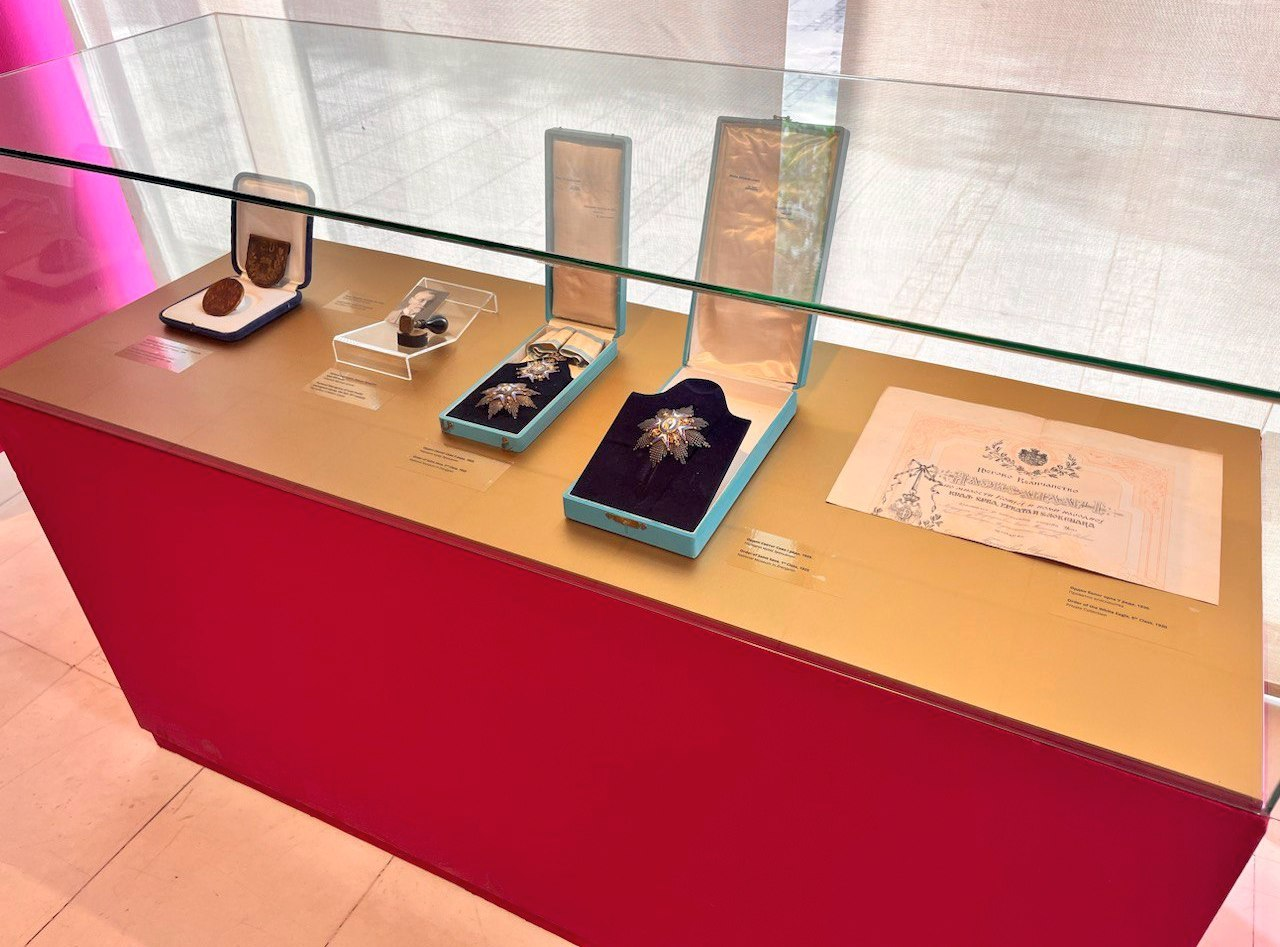
Predić's orders and decorations

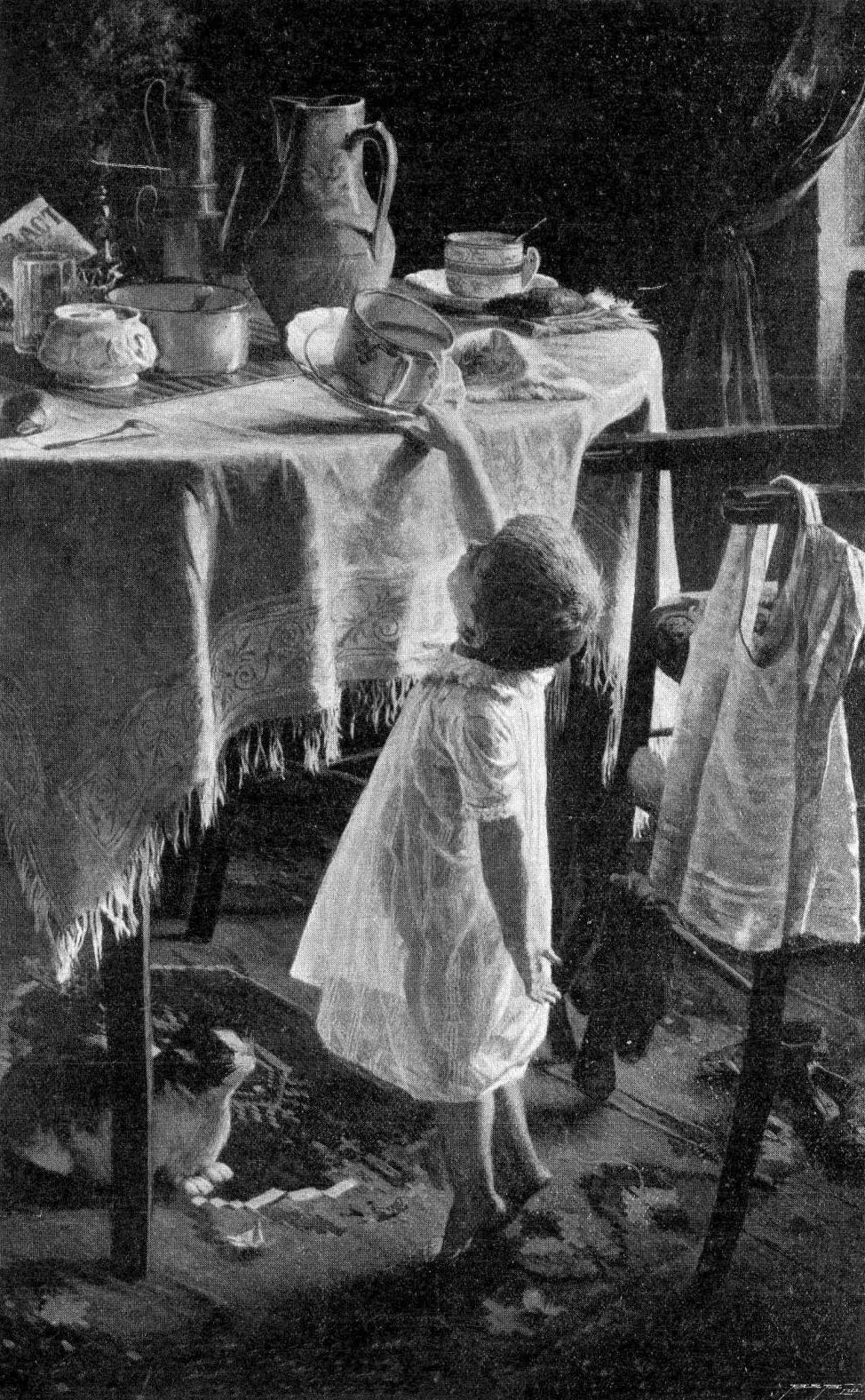
Copy of Going to Be Trouble (1886); the original has never been recovered.

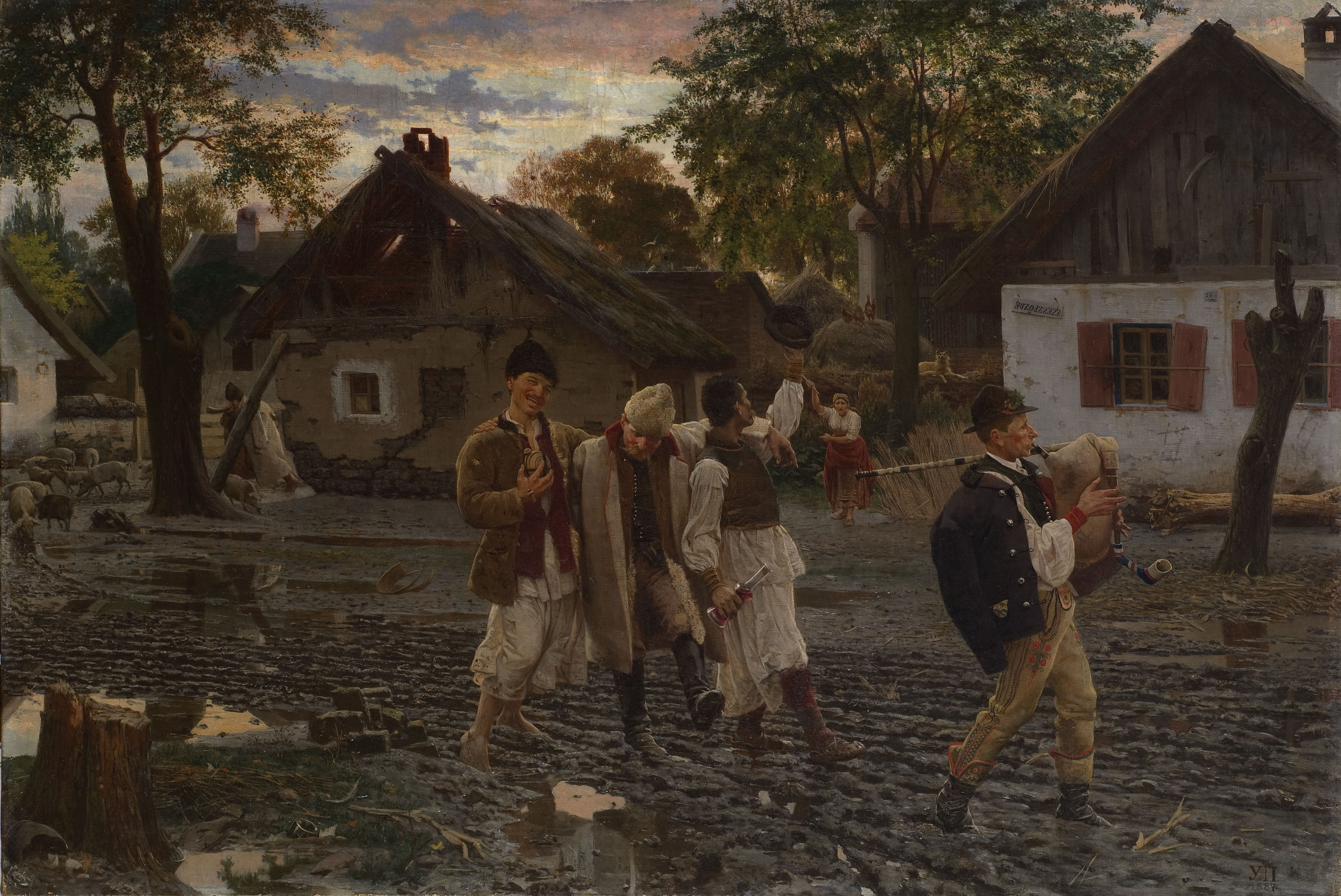
Happy Brothers, painting, 1887

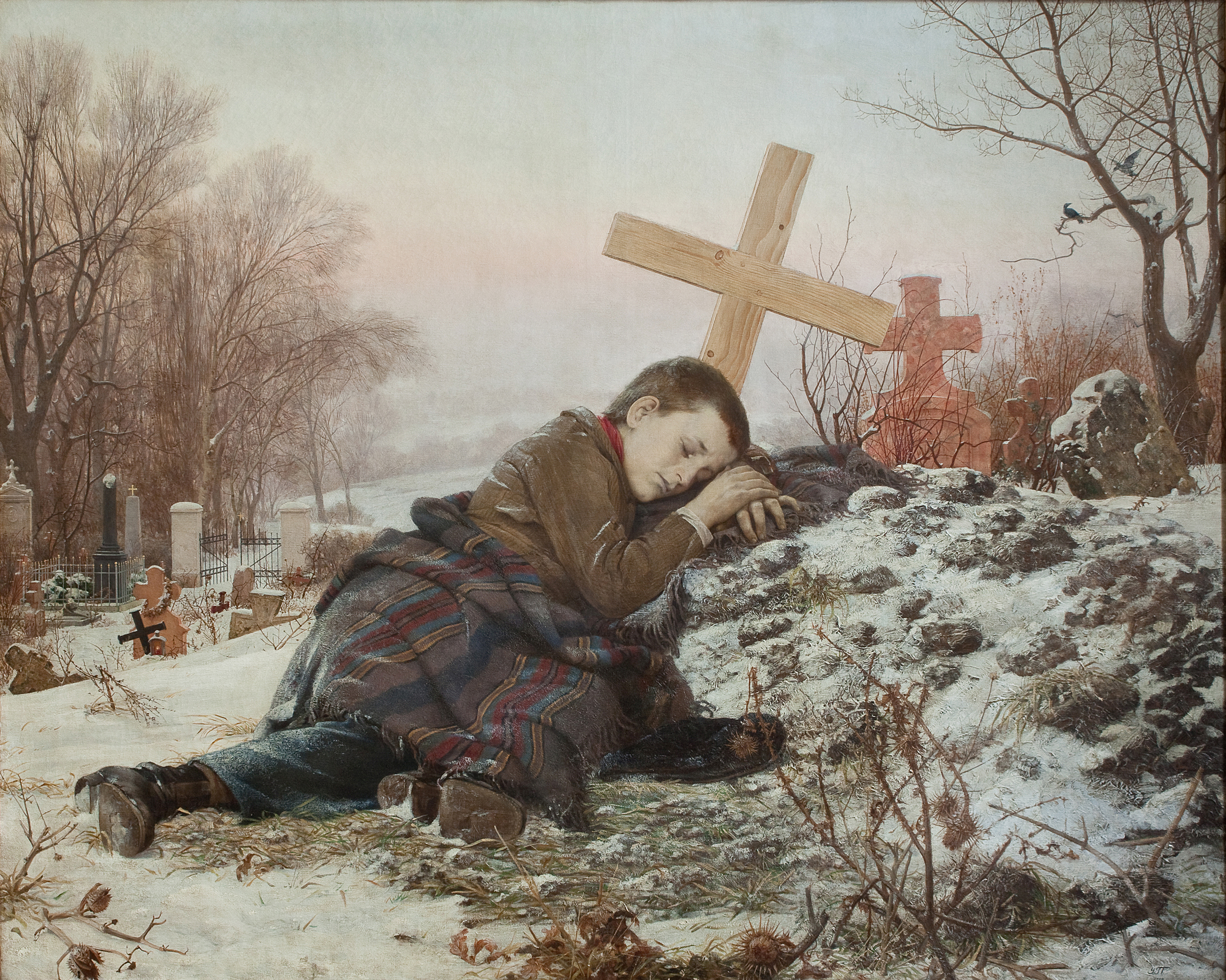
Orphan on Mother's Grave, painting, 1888

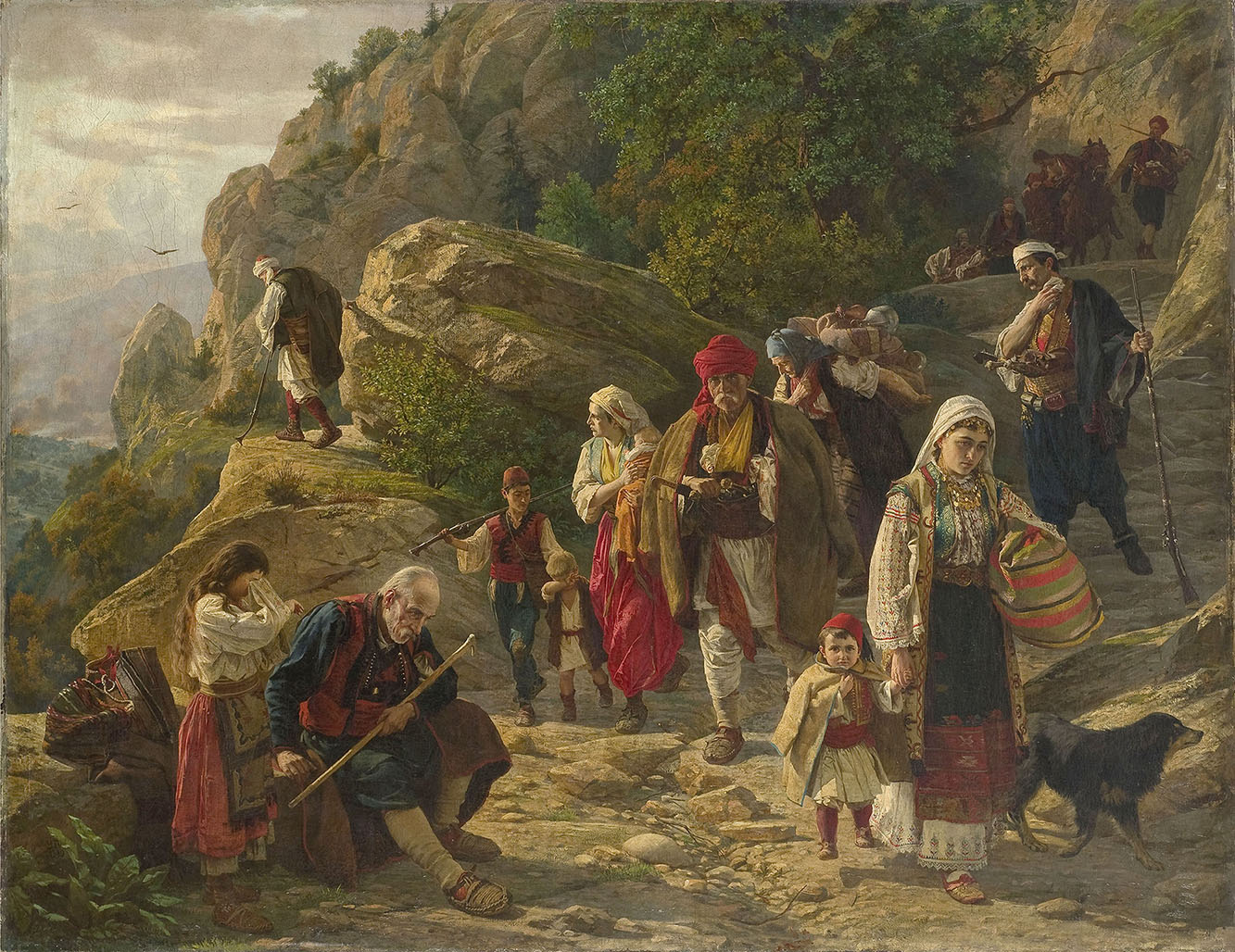
Refugees from the Herzegovina Uprising, painting, 1889

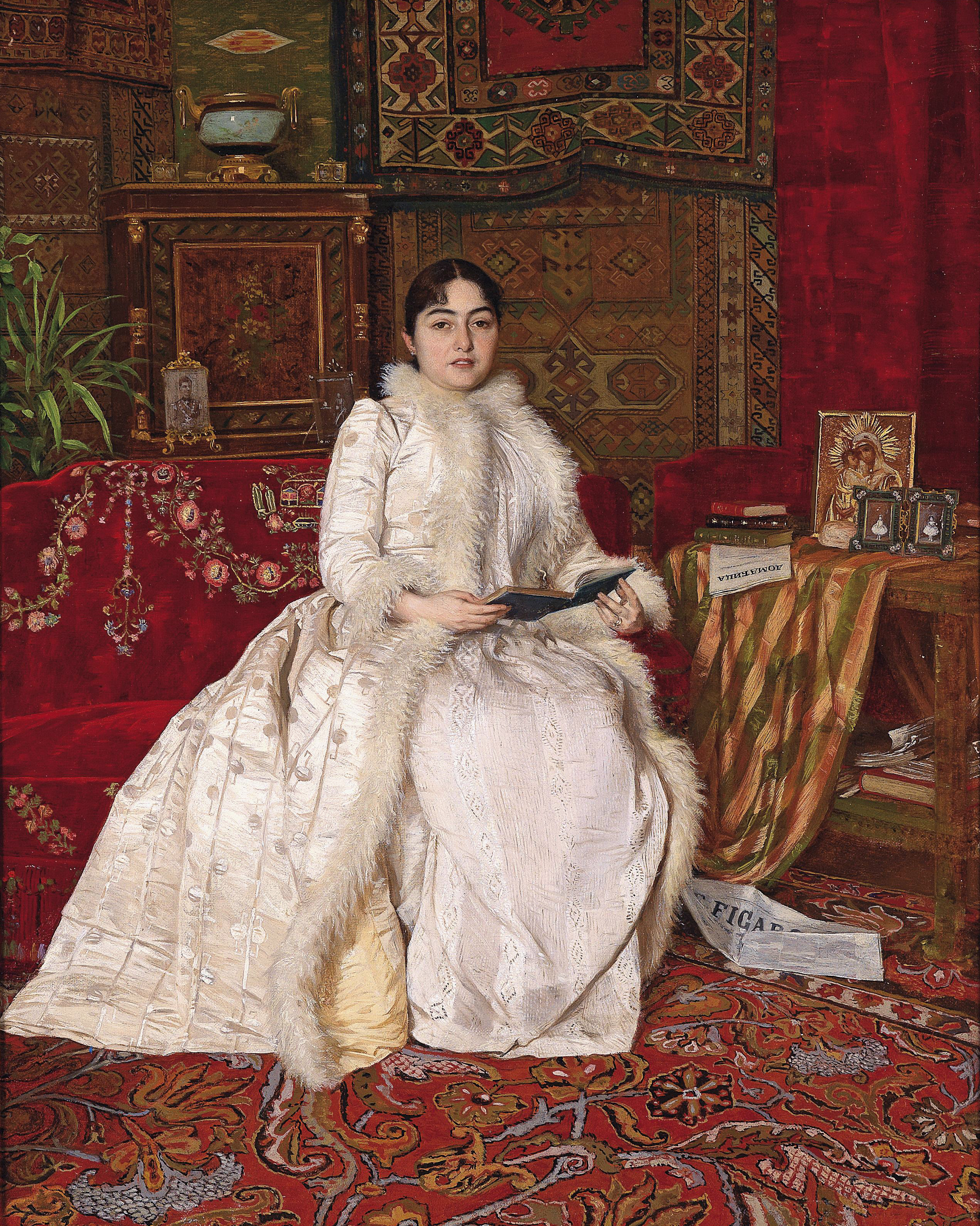
Queen Natalia Obrenović of Serbia, 1890

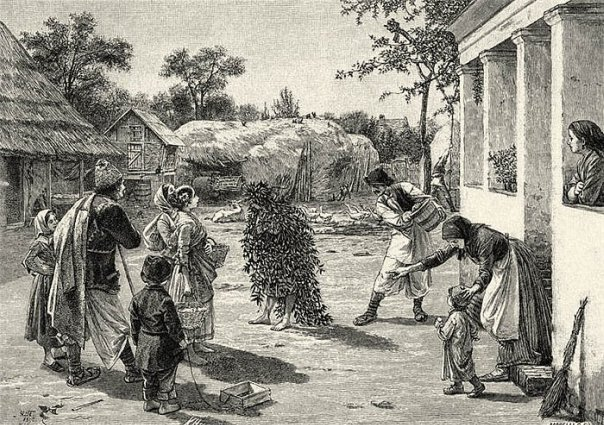
Watering of Dodola, painting, Orao magazine, 1892

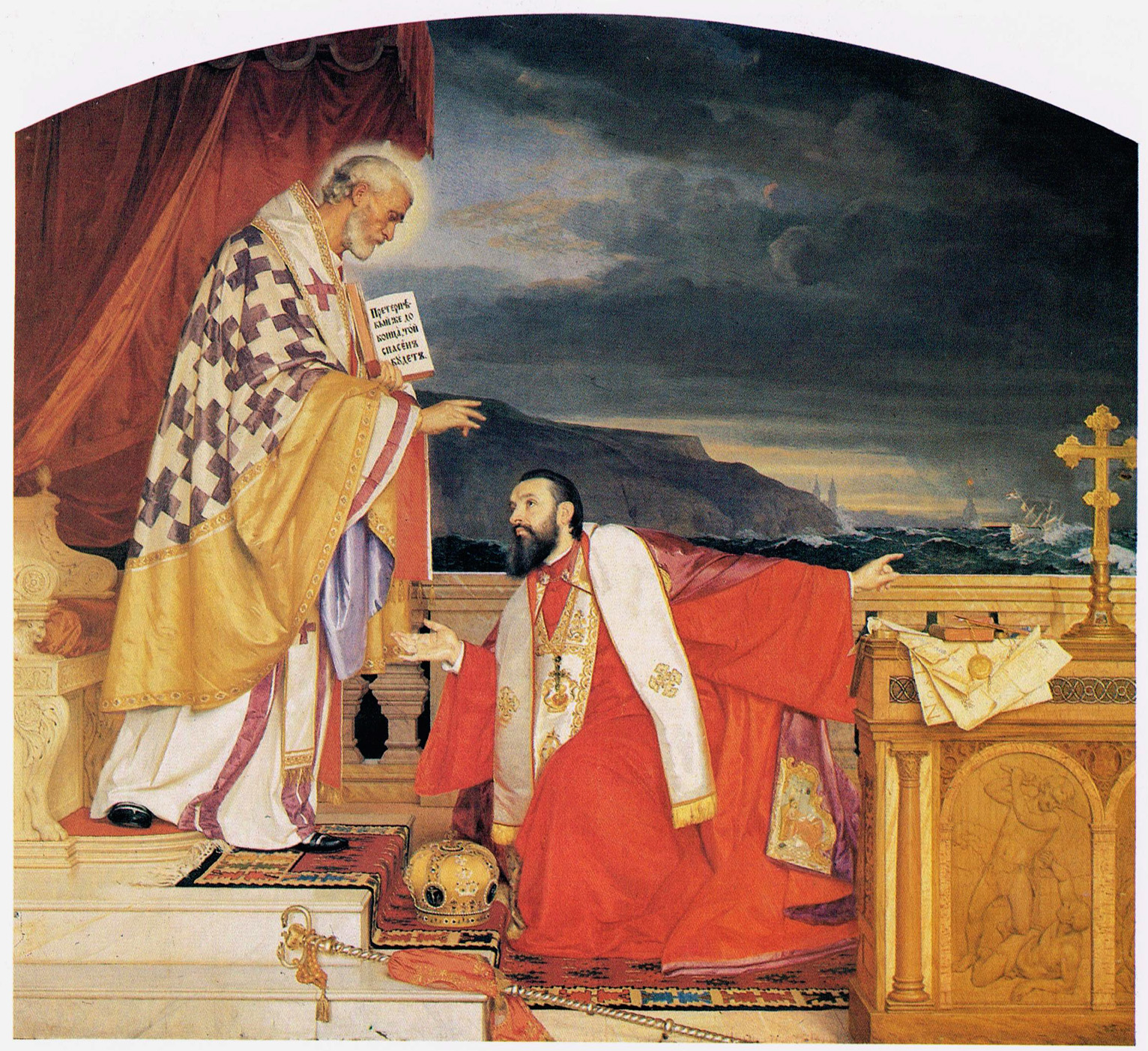
The Turbulent Sea, painting, 1910

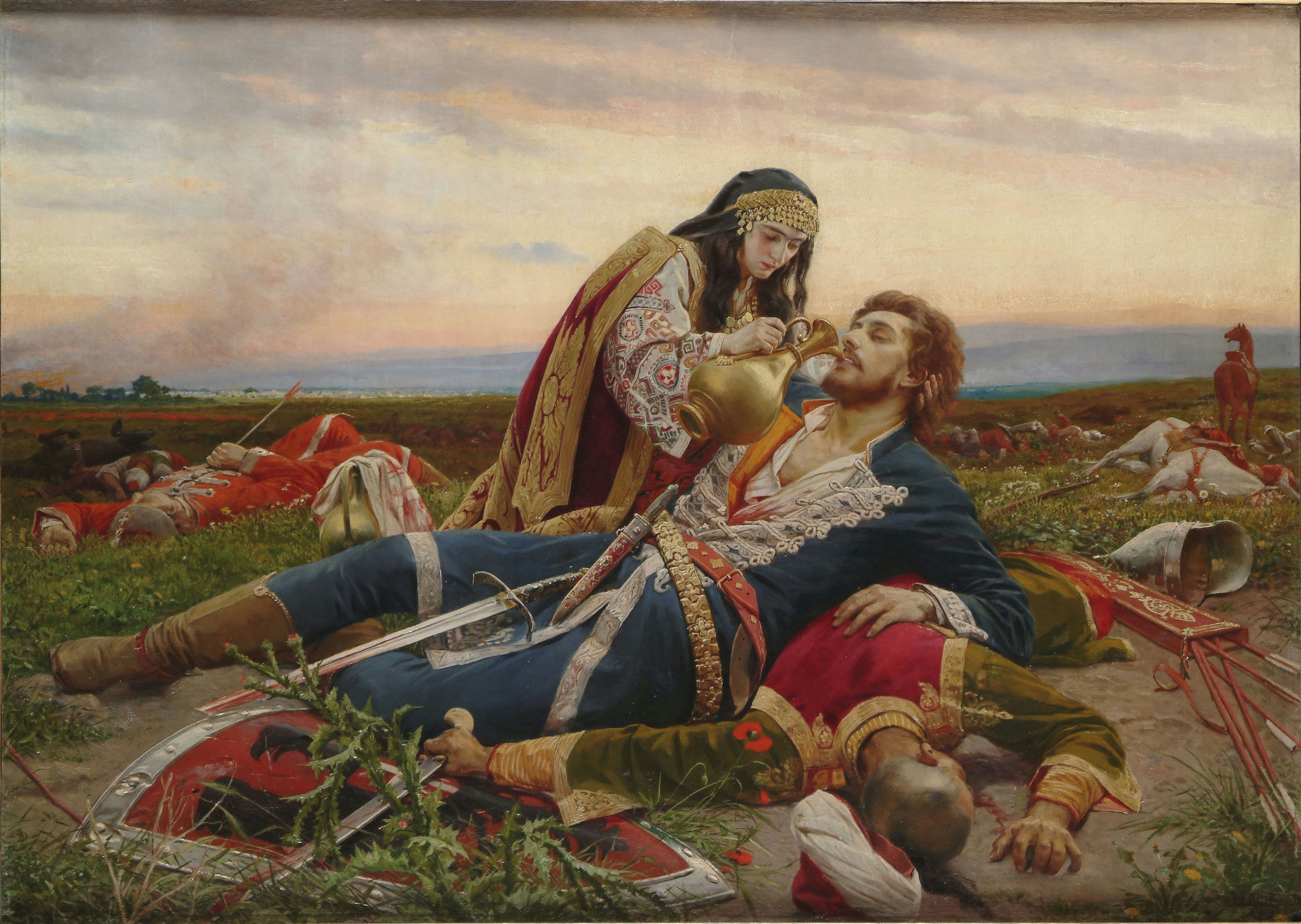
Kosovo Maiden, painting, 1919

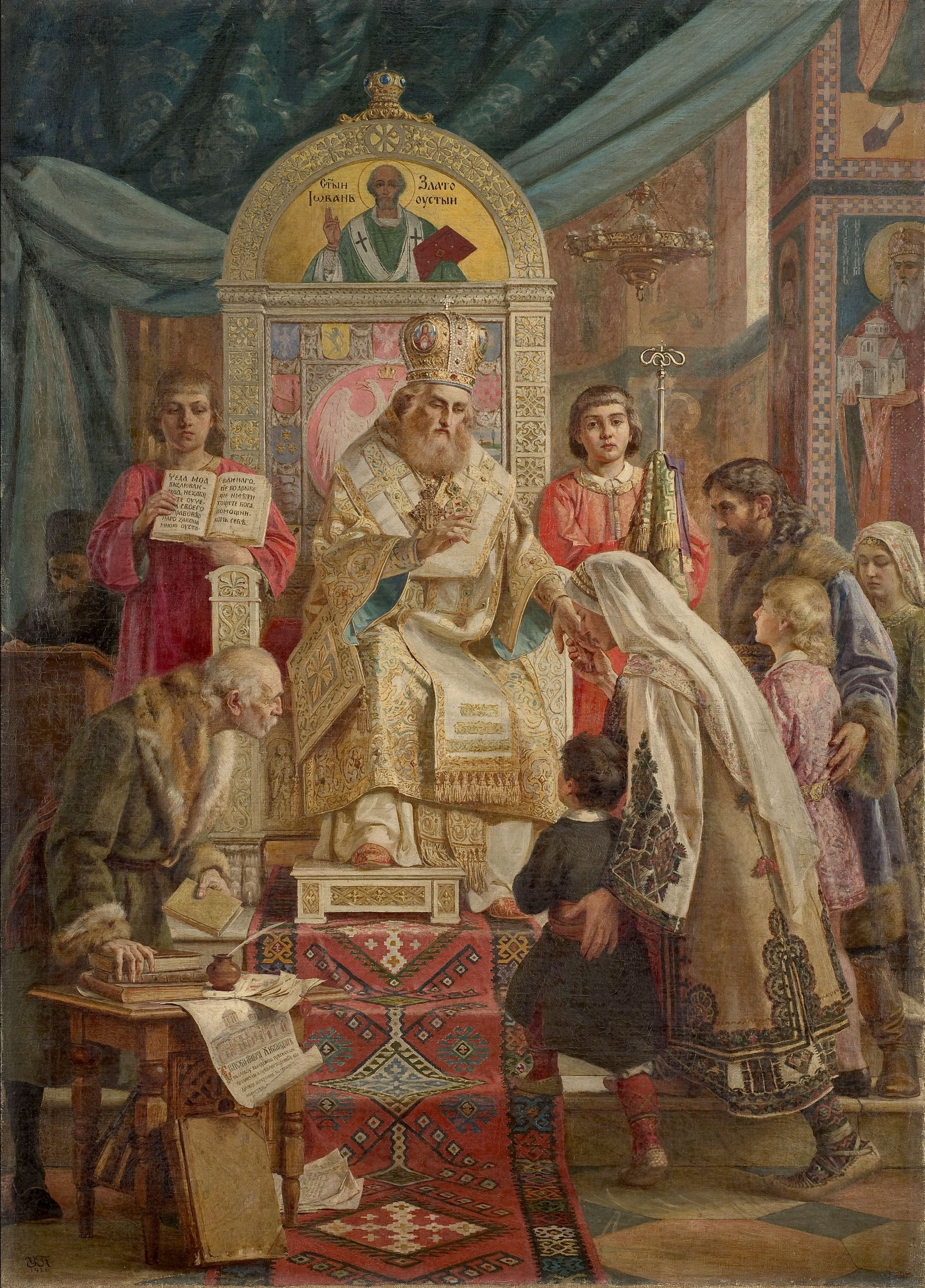
Saint Sava Blesses Serb Youth, 1921

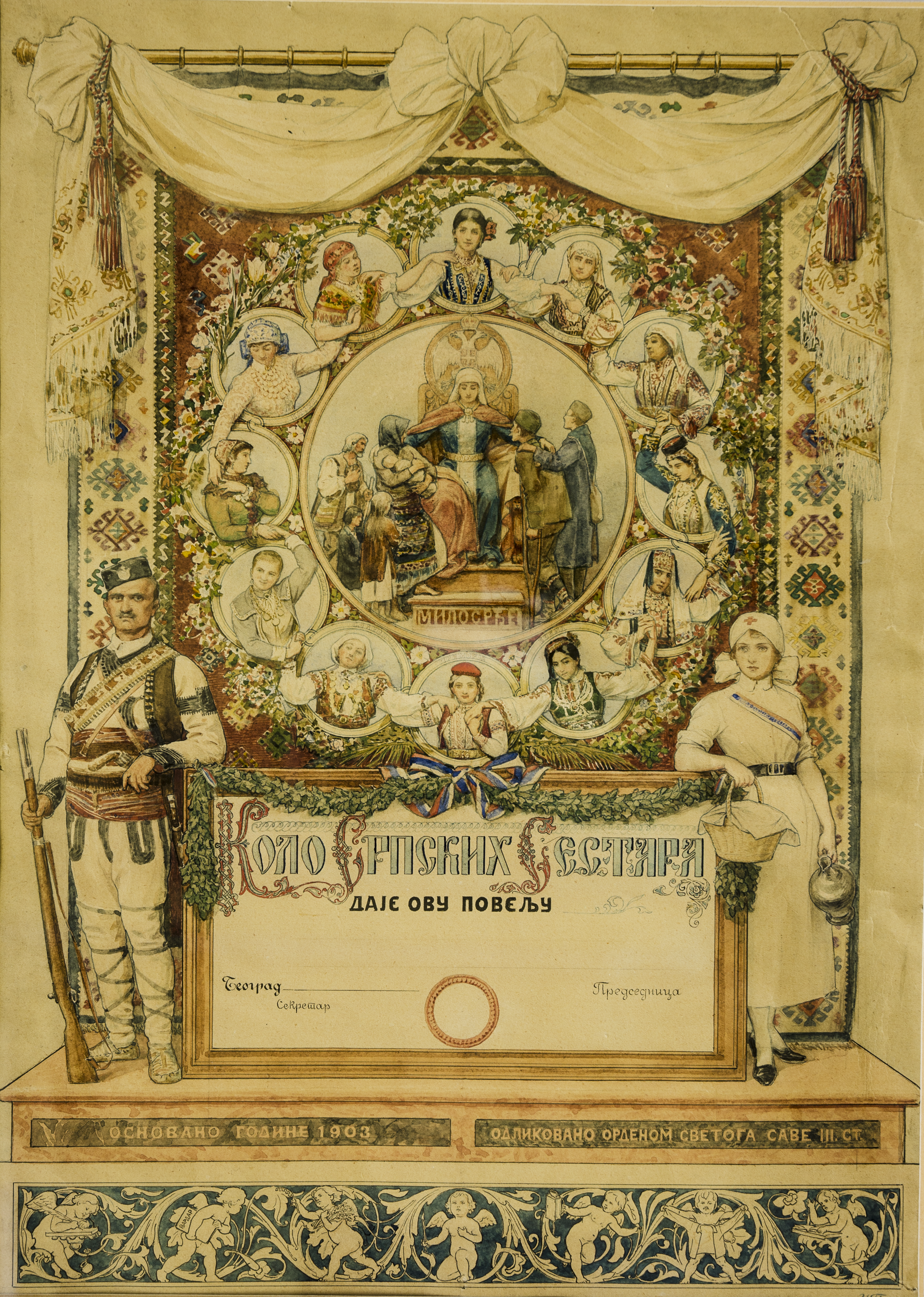
Circle of Serbian Sisters Charter, 1922

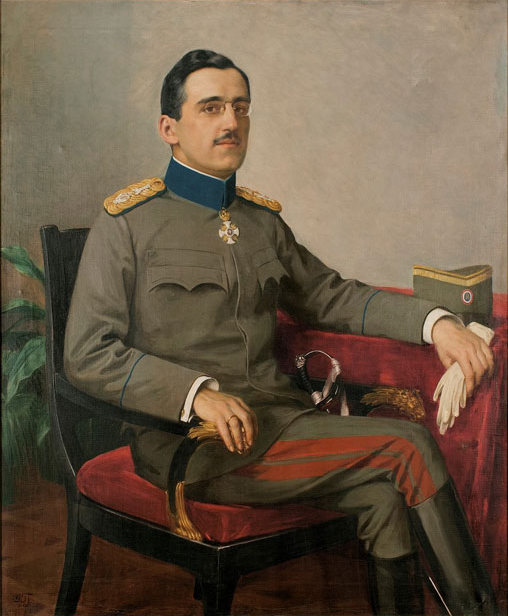
King Alexander I of Yugoslavia by Uroš Predić

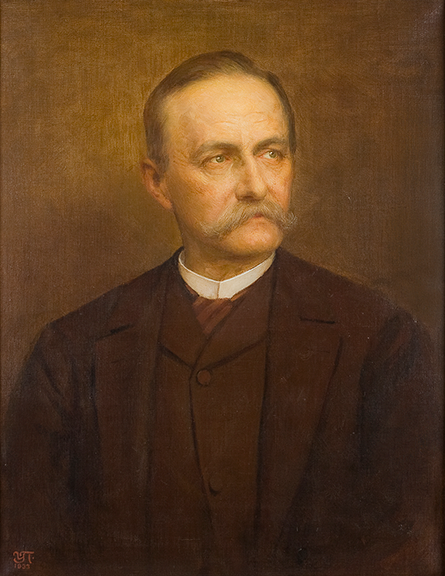
Jovan Jovanović Zmaj

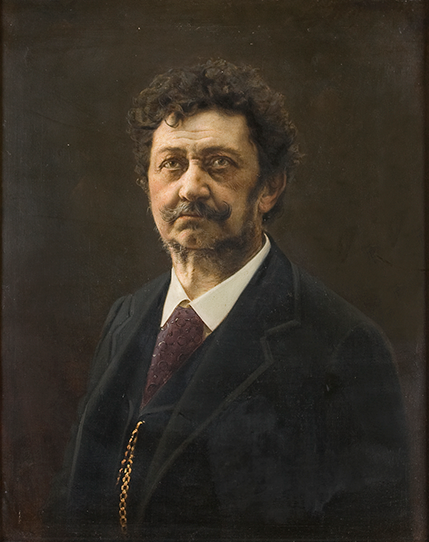
Laza Kostić

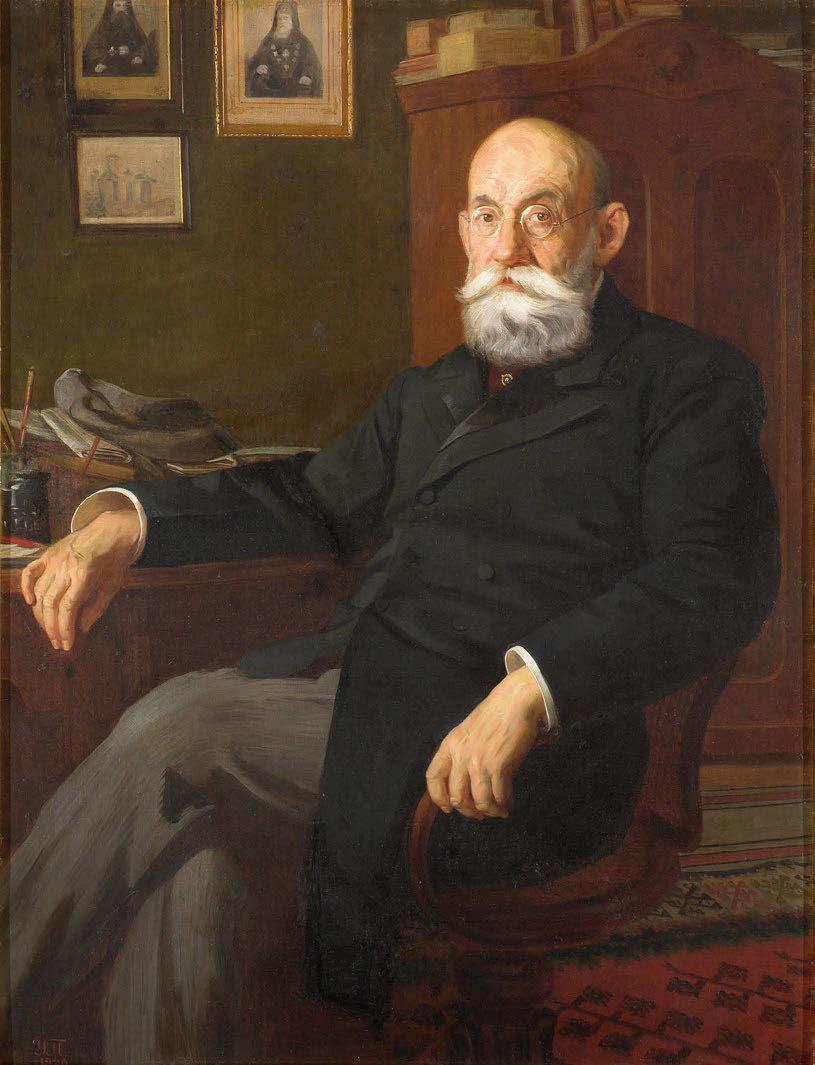
Stojan Novaković

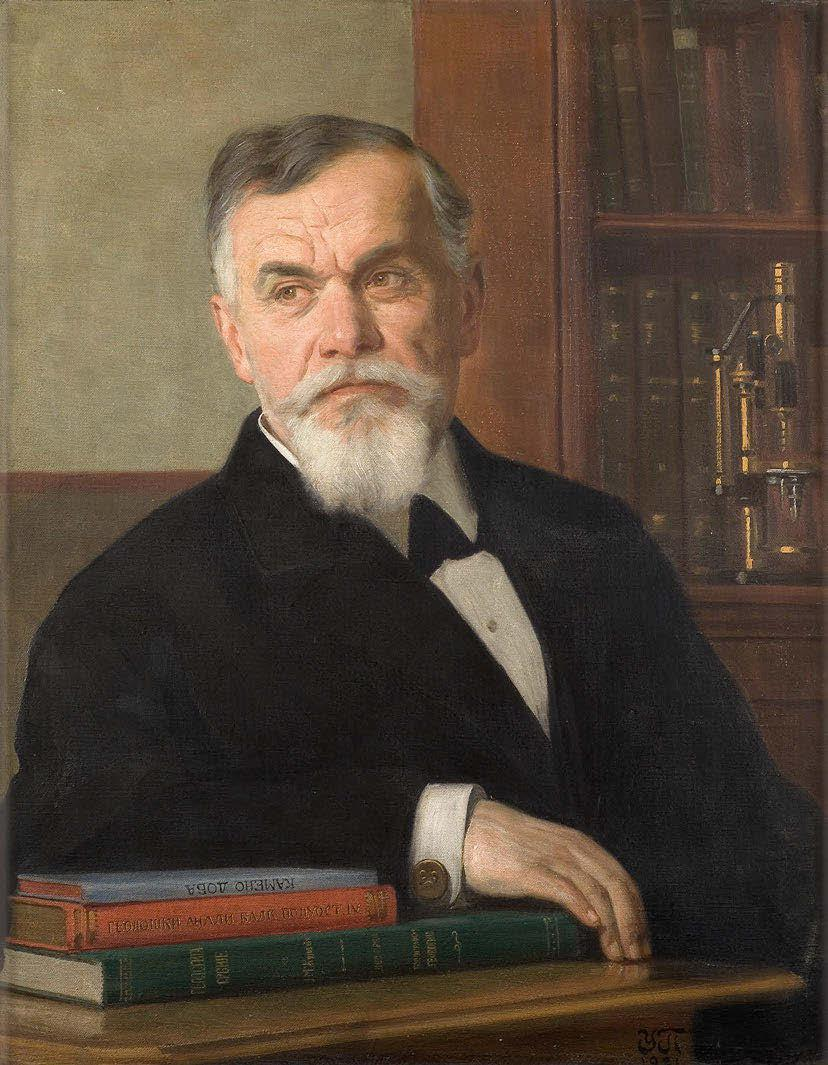
Jovan Žujović

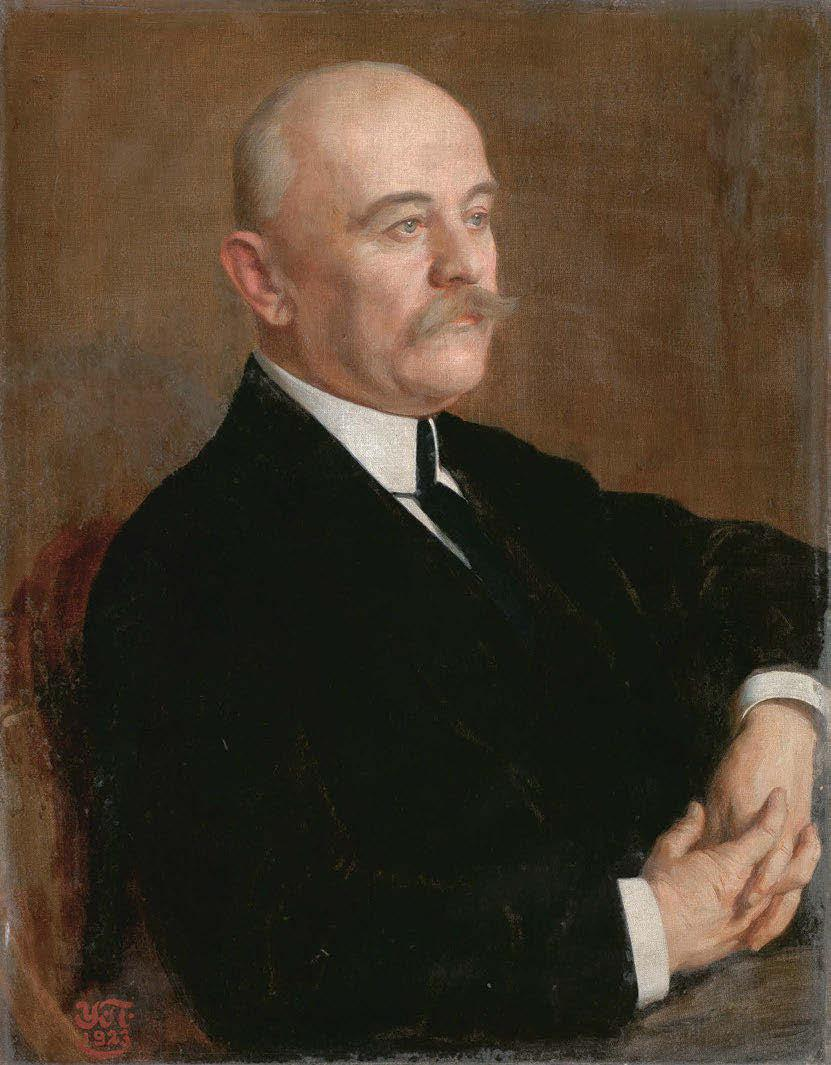
Jovan Cvijić

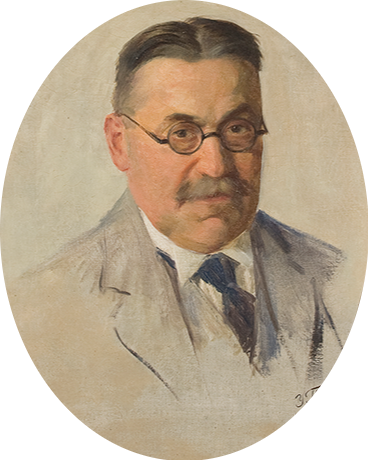
Mihailo Pupin

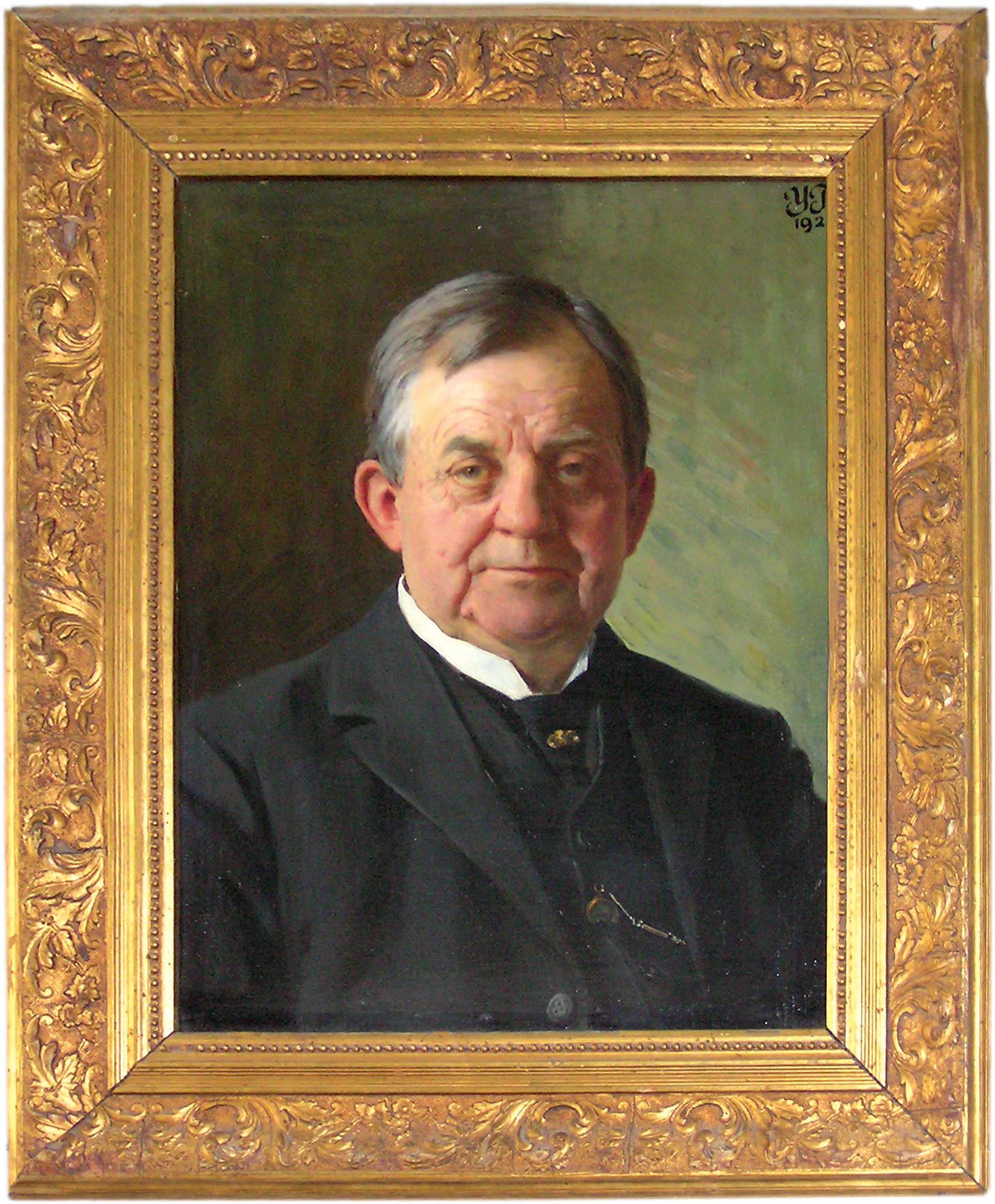
Pera Dobrinović

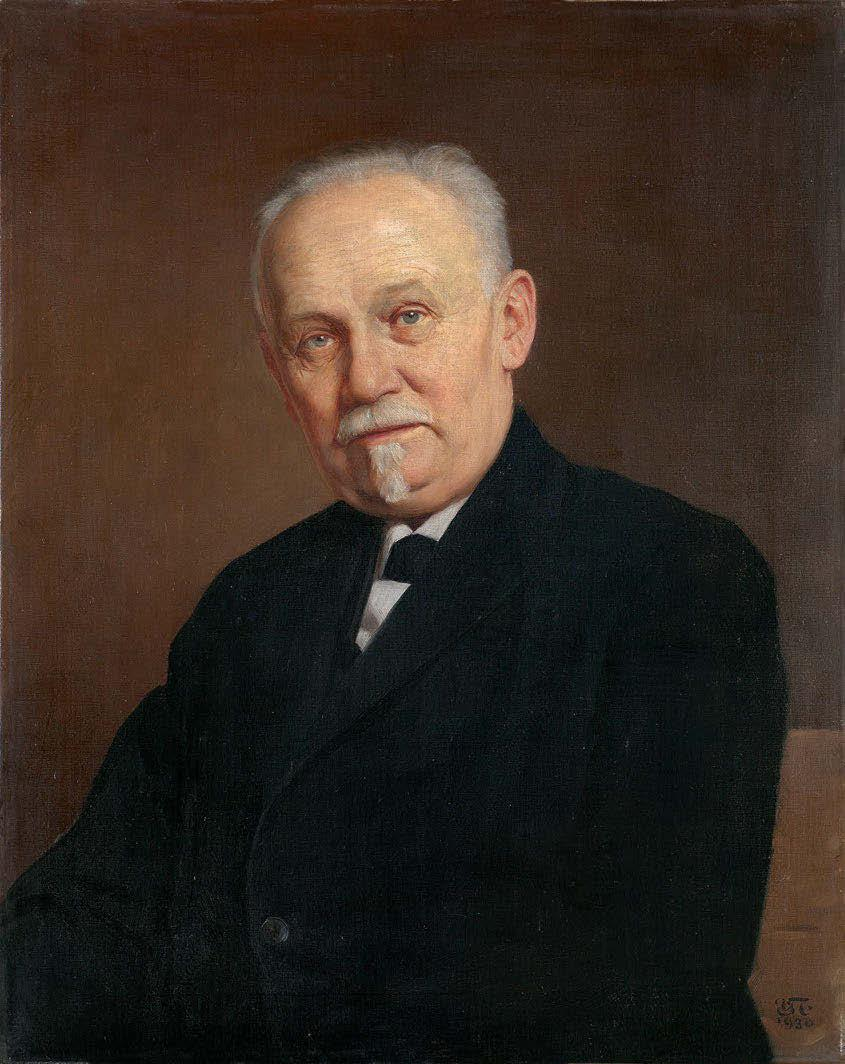
Slobodan Jovanović

== See also ==
- Serbian art
- Paja Jovanović
- Đorđe Krstić
