= Orlovat =

Orlovat Орловат
- Village (Selo)
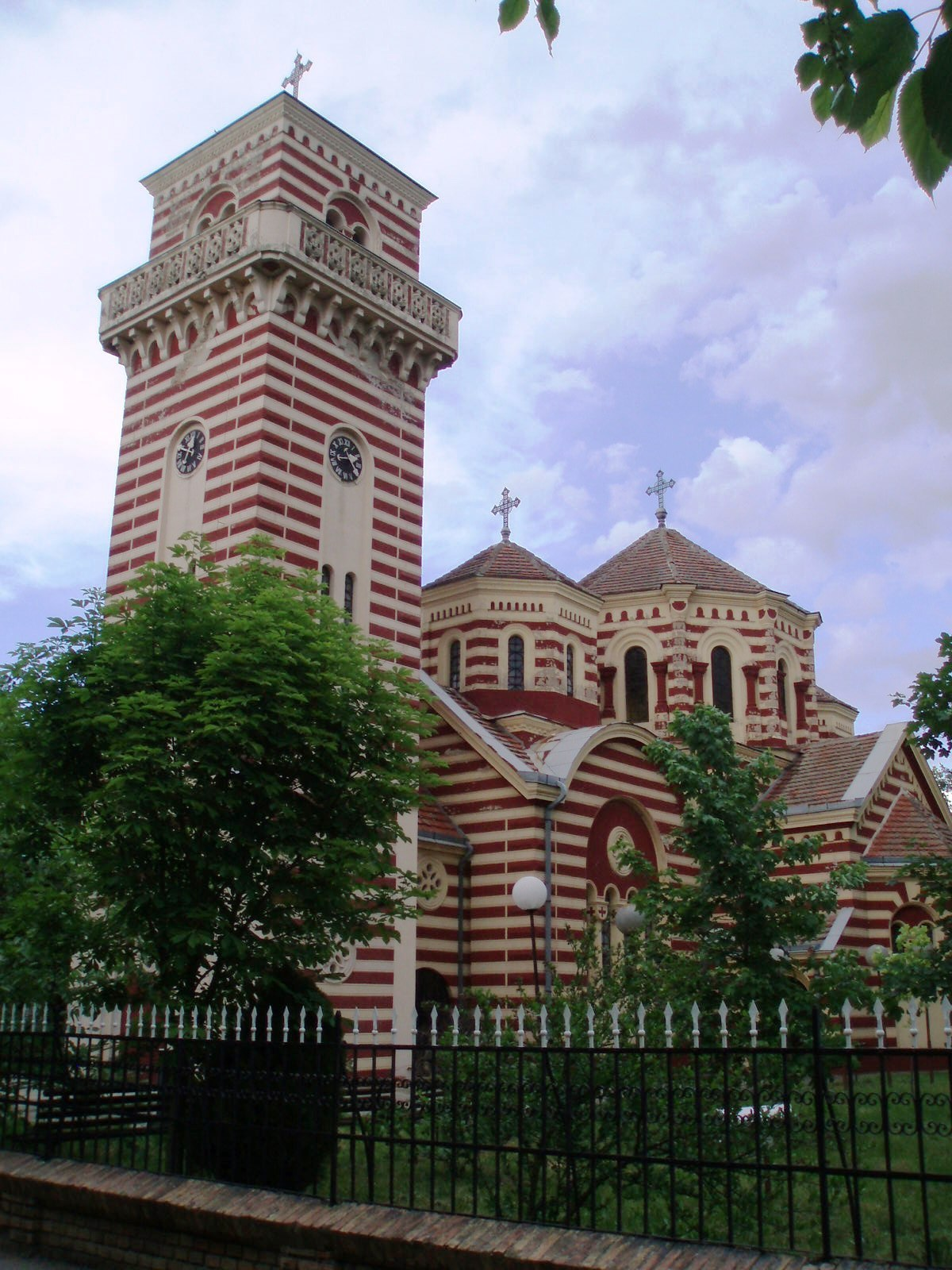
- The Orthodox Church

- Location within Serbia Orlovat (Serbia) Orlovat (Europe)
- Coordinates: 45°14′22″N 20°34′34″E
- Country: Serbia
- Province: Vojvodina
- District: Central Banat
- Municipalities: Zrenjanin
- Elevation: 68 m (223 ft)

Population (2002)
  - Orlovat: 1,789
- Time zone: UTC+1 (CET)
  - Summer (DST): UTC+2 (CEST)
- Postal code: 23263
- Area code: +381(0)23
- Car plates: ZR

Orlovat (Serbian Cyrillic: Орловат; Hungarian: Orlód) is a village in Serbia. It is situated in the Zrenjanin municipality, in the Central Banat District, Vojvodina province. The village has a Serb ethnic majority (95.52%) and its population numbering 1,789 people (2002 census).

== Name ==
In Serbian, the village is known as Orlovat (Орловат), in Hungarian as Orlód, and in German as Orlowat. Its name derived from Serbian word "orao" ("eagle" in English). In various historical sources name was also written as Orlovath, Borlod, Orlod, etc.

== History ==
In 1471, Orlovat was recorded as a town. After Ottoman conquest in the 16th century, number of its inhabitants was reduced and it became a village. In 1660, all of its inhabitants were Serbs and it had 16 houses. Since 1697–98, Orlovat is situated at the new location - this new settlement was founded by Serbs who came from Sentandreja and from old Orlovat. Since 1773, the village was part of the Banatian Military Frontier. In 1848, an important battle between Serb and Hungarian army occurred at this place, in which Austro-Serb army led by Stevan Knićanin defeated Hungarians. Since the abolishment of Banatian Military Frontier in 1872, Orlovat was part of Torontal county and, since 1918, it was part of the Kingdom of Serbs, Croats and Slovenes and subsequently Serbia.

== Historical population ==
- 1961: 2,335
- 1971: 2,298
- 1981: 2,159
- 1991: 1,933
- 2002: 1,789

== Notable residents ==
- Uroš Predić, painter, born in 1857 in Orlovat.
- Duško Tošić, football player.

== See also ==
- List of places in Serbia
- List of cities, towns and villages in Vojvodina
